= Artwork at the World Trade Center =

Artwork at the World Trade Center may refer to:

- Artwork at the World Trade Center (1973–2001)
- Artwork at the World Trade Center (2001–present)

== See also ==
- Artwork damaged or destroyed in the September 11 attacks
- World Trade Center (disambiguation)
