= Sky Gate, New York =

Sculpture by Louise Nevelson

- Artist: Louise Nevelson
- Completion date: 1978
- Dimensions: 520 cm × 980 cm (17 ft × 32 ft)
- Condition: Destroyed during the September 11 attacks
- Location: 40.712°N 74.013°W

Sky Gate, New York was a sculpture by the artist Louise Nevelson, located in the mezzanine of the North Tower of the World Trade Center in New York, from 1978 until its 2001 destruction in the collapse of the buildings during the September 11 attacks.

Nevelson was inspired by a New York skyline view she had seen from a flight from New York to Washington, saying the work was a translation of the skyline, calling her sculpture a "night piece" representing the "windows of New York".

== History ==
The sculpture was commissioned by Saul Wenegrat, director of the art program for the Port Authority of New York and New Jersey, for the World Trade Center and its "Percent For Art" program. The piece evolved through several redesigns before its dedication.

The largest work the sculptor had created to date, the wall piece was 32 ft (9.8 m) wide, 17 ft (5.2 m) tall and 1 ft (0.30 m) thick — and comprised more than 35 segments, each a dark painted wood relief. Completed in 1977 or 1978 (reported variously), Sky Gate was dedicated at the mezzanine of One World Trade Center on December 12, 1978, overlooking Austin J. Tobin Plaza. Kitty Carlisle Hart, chair of the New York State Council on the Arts presided over the ceremony.

The sculpture was destroyed during the September 11 attacks in 2001 and was not recovered.

Sky Gate was symbolically rededicated on December 12, 2025, by the Art Authority Museum, a virtual museum.

== See also ==
- Artwork at the World Trade Center (1973–2001)
- List of Louise Nevelson public art works
- Bent Propeller
- Artwork damaged or destroyed in the September 11 attacks
