= Bent Propeller =

Sculpture by Alexander Calder

- Bent Propeller pictured in 1971
- Artist: Alexander Calder
- Completion date: 1970
- Medium: Sculpture
- Dimensions: 760 cm (25 ft)
- Condition: Severely damaged in the September 11 attacks in 2001 (partially intact)
- Location: New York City; 40°42′47.1″N 74°0′43.9″W

Bent Propeller (also known as World Trade Center Stabile) was a red stainless steel sculpture by Alexander Calder.

== Description ==
The main elements of the 25 feet (7.6 m) high sculpture were three sheets of curved metal, linked together to form a static work resting under its own weight, making it what Calder called a "stabile", as opposed to his famous "mobile" sculptures. It was reminiscent of a ship's propeller. Like many of Calder's public sculptures, it was painted red.

== History ==
Bent Propeller as seen from the WTC observation deck in August 1992.

The sculpture was commissioned by the Port Authority of New York and New Jersey in 1969 and installed in 1970 at the World Trade Center in New York City. The work was first installed near the entrance to 1 World Trade Center (the North Tower). It was moved in 1987 to a plaza in front of 7 World Trade Center, on the northeast corner of the Austin J. Tobin Plaza by Vesey Street and Church Street.

The work was severely damaged in 2001 in the aftermath of the September 11 attacks, being crushed under thousands of tons of rubble when 7 World Trade Center collapsed. About 40 percent of the sculpture was recovered from the debris in the following months. The remainder of the sculpture was never recovered, and any of its unrecovered remains were removed from Ground Zero along with the rest of the rubble.

With not enough of the original sculpture remaining for a restoration, the recovered elements were stored by the Calder Foundation. Today, a portion of the recovered sculpture can be found at the National September 11 Memorial & Museum.

== See also ==
- Artwork at the World Trade Center (1973–2001)
- Artwork damaged or destroyed in the September 11 attacks
- Sky Gate, New York
- List of Alexander Calder public works
