= Barry Schwabsky =

American art historian

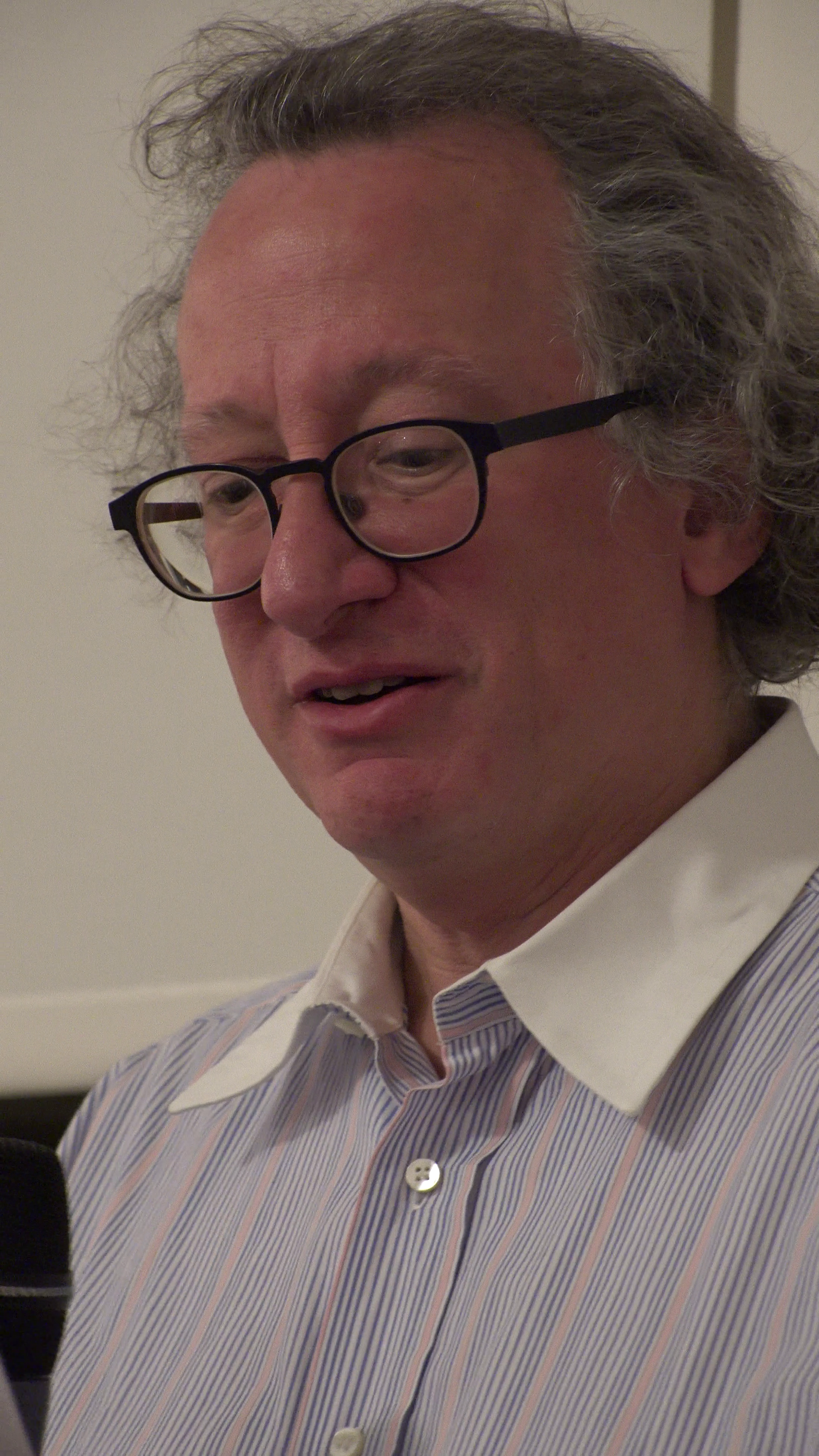

Barry Schwabsky (b. Paterson, New Jersey, in 1957) is an American art critic, art historian and poet. He has taught at the School of Visual Arts, Pratt Institute, New York University, Yale University, and Goldsmiths College, among others.

== Art criticism ==
Schwabsky is art critic for The Nation and co-editor of international reviews for Artforum. Schwabsky's essays have appeared in many other publications, including Flash Art, Contemporary, London Review of Books, and Art in America.

His art criticism books include: Words for Art: Criticism, History, Theory, Practice (Ram Publications); The Widening Circle: Consequences of Modernism in Contemporary Art (Cambridge University Press); and contributions to Abstract Painting: Concepts and Techniques and Vitamin P: New Perspectives in Painting (Phaidon Press). He has published books on Jessica Stockholder, Mel Bochner, Chloe Piene, Karin Davie, Dana Schutz, Alex Katz, Gillian Wearing, Henri Matisse, and Alighiero Boetti, among others.

He was an early contributor to The Thing.

== Poetry publications ==
- Trembling Hand Equilibrium (Black Square Editions)
- Book Left Open in the Rain (Black Square Editions)
- 12 Abandoned Poems (Kilmog Press)
- Poems 1981–2002 (Meritage Press)
- Fate/Seen in the Dark (Burning Deck)

== Personal life ==
Schwabsky attended Haverford College, graduating in 1979 and is married to artist Carol Szymanski. They reside in New York City with their two daughters.

== See also ==
- Post-conceptual art
- Postmodern art
