= Artwork at the World Trade Center (1973–2001) =

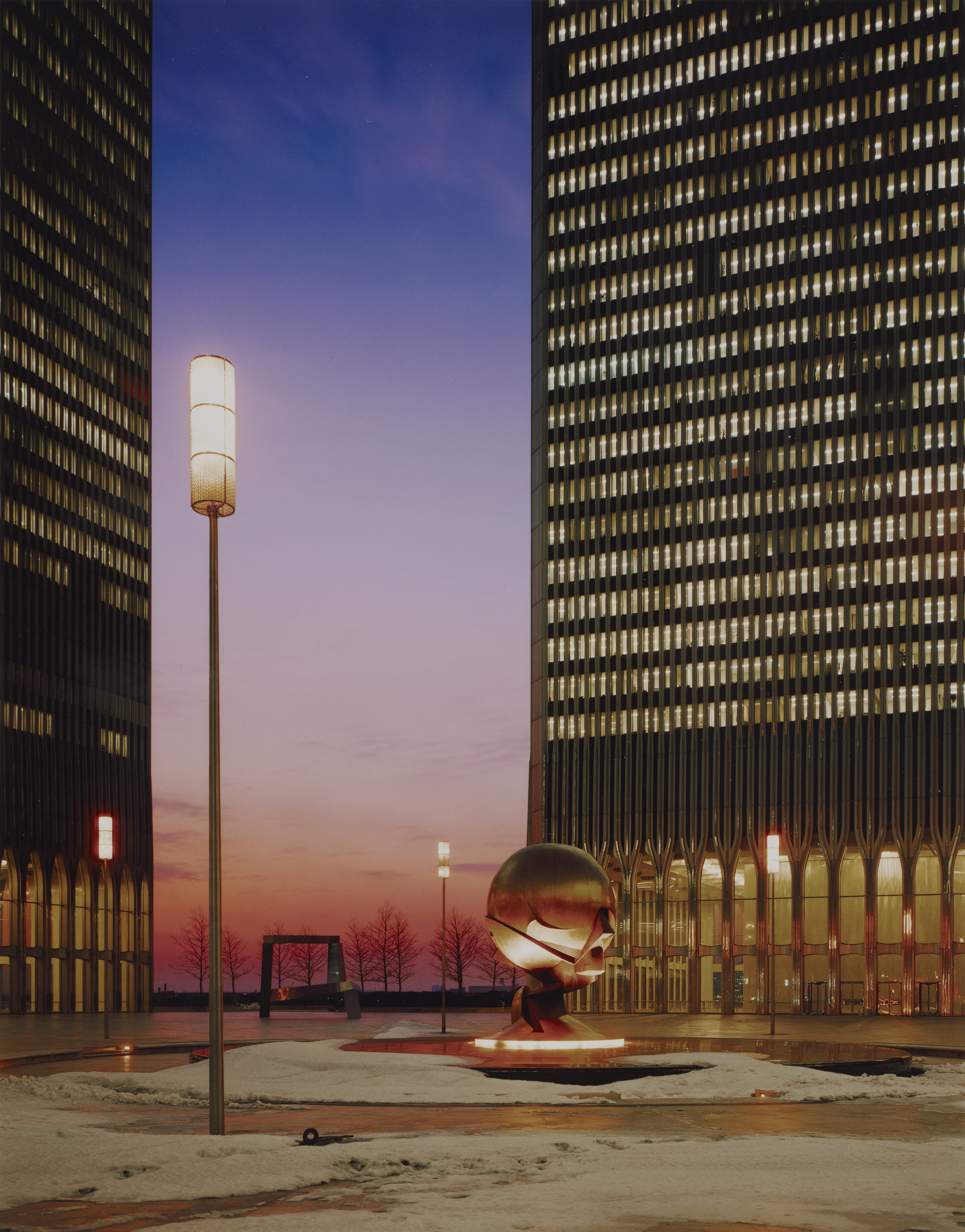
The Sphere, which was located on the plaza and ultimately survived the September 11 attacks.

The original World Trade Center complex featured a variety of sculptures and other art pieces from 1973 until the destruction of the buildings in the September 11 attacks. Many of these art pieces were located on the Austin J. Tobin Plaza in the center of the complex, or in the lobby of 7 World Trade Center.

== Works ==
=== The Hudson River Portfolio (1820) by William Guy Wall ===
The Hudson River Portfolio is a series of 20 engravings of the Hudson River, completed by William Guy Wall in 1820. One of the engravings was located at the complex, and was destroyed.

=== Bird's Eye View of New York and Brooklyn (1851) by John Backman ===
The Hudson River Portfolio is a widely reprinted etching on stone of Brooklyn seen from the air, completed by John Backman in 1851. One of these prints, located in the complex, was destroyed in the September 11 attacks.

=== Bent Propeller (1970) by Alexander Calder ===
The sculpture was commissioned by the Port Authority of New York and New Jersey in 1969 and installed in 1970 at the World Trade Center in New York City.

The sculpture was heavily damaged in the collapse of 7 World Trade Center, where the sculpture was located. Only around 40 percent of the sculpture was recovered from the site after the attacks. With not enough of the original remaining for a restoration, the recovered elements were stored by the Calder Foundation. Today, a portion of the sculpture can be found at the National September 11 Memorial & Museum.

=== The Sphere (1971) by Fritz Koenig ===
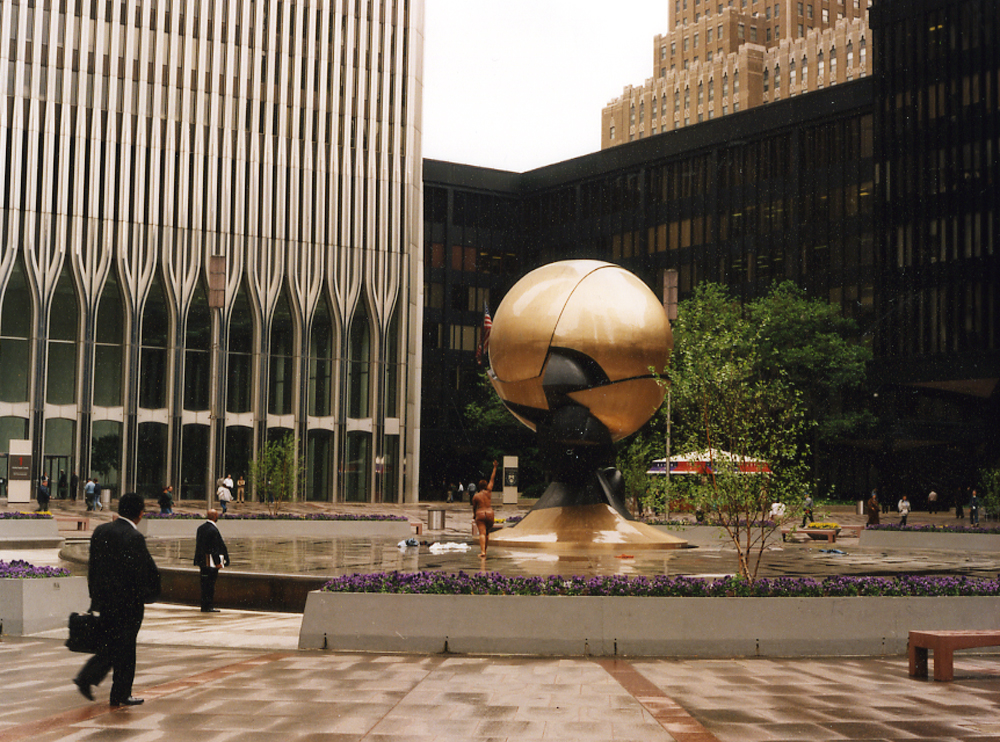
The Sphere, located in the center of the plaza.

The world's largest bronze sculpture of modern times stood between the Twin Towers on the Austin J. Tobin Plaza of the World Trade Center in New York City from 1972 until the September 11 attacks. The work, weighing more than 20 tons, was the only work of public art to be recovered largely intact from the ruins of the collapsed Twin Towers. After being dismantled and stored near a hangar at John F. Kennedy International Airport, the sculpture was the subject of the 2001 documentary Koenig's Sphere. Since then, the bronze sphere has become a memorial for the attacks.

The sculpture was installed in Battery Park between 2002 and 2017, when the Port Authority of New York and New Jersey moved it to Liberty Park, overlooking the September 11 Memorial and its original location. The sculpture, rededicated at its permanent location on August 16, 2017, has been kept in the badly damaged condition it was found in after the September 11 attacks.

=== Ideogram (1972) by James Rosati ===
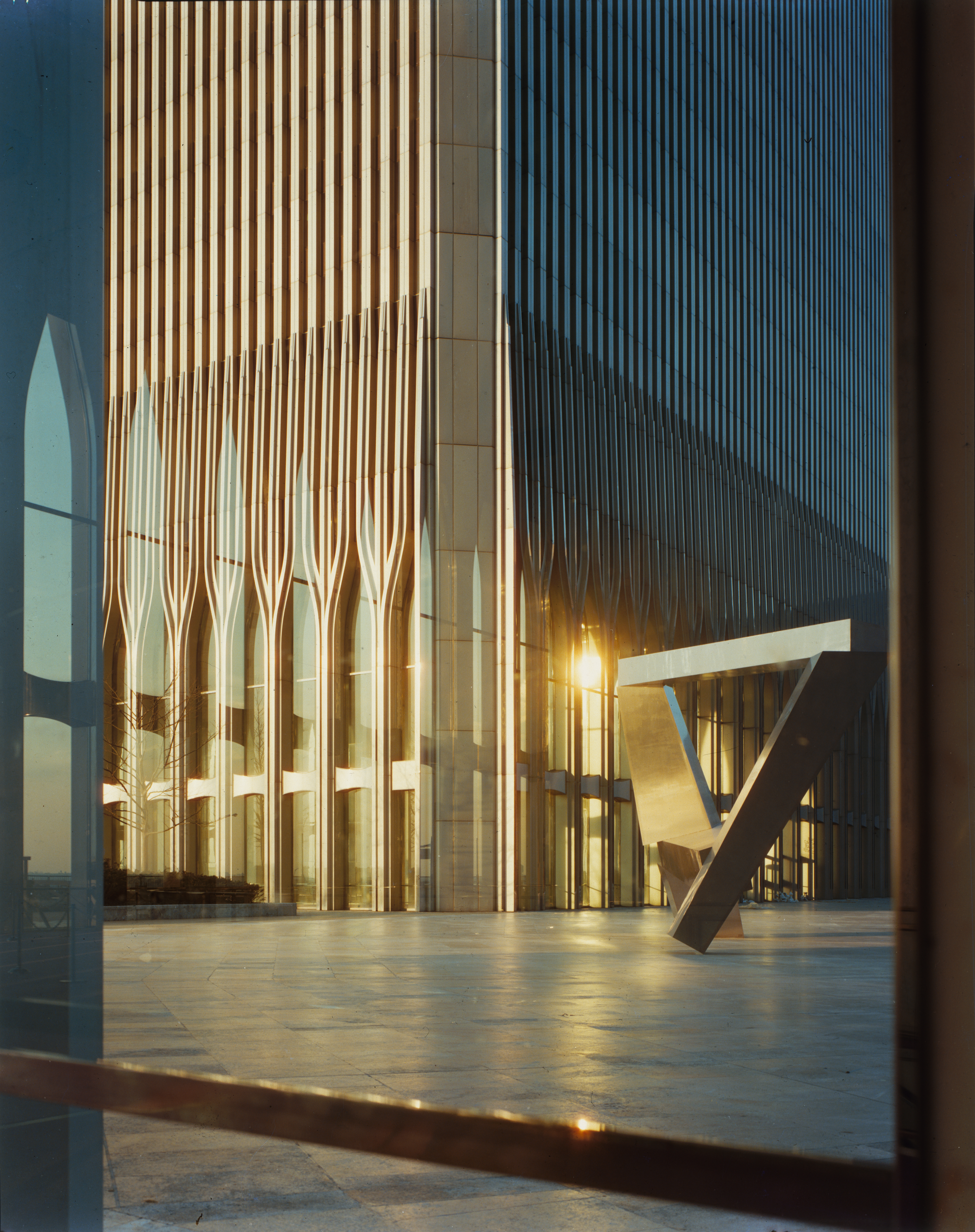
The Austin J. Tobin Plaza, with Ideogram in view.

Located on the Austin J. Tobin Plaza, in front of the Marriott World Trade Center, the work was lost in the September 11 attacks. Though the sculpture may have survived the attacks and collapse of the buildings, its steel material was indistinguishable from the Ground Zero rubble. As a result, the sculpture was never recovered, and its remains were removed from Ground Zero along with the rest of the rubble.

According to Saul Wenegrat, former director of the art program for the Port Authority, the sculpture may have been the most photographed piece of art in the World Trade Center Complex. It was also featured in many fashion advertisements.

=== World Trade Center Plaza Sculpture (1972) by Masayuki Nagare ===
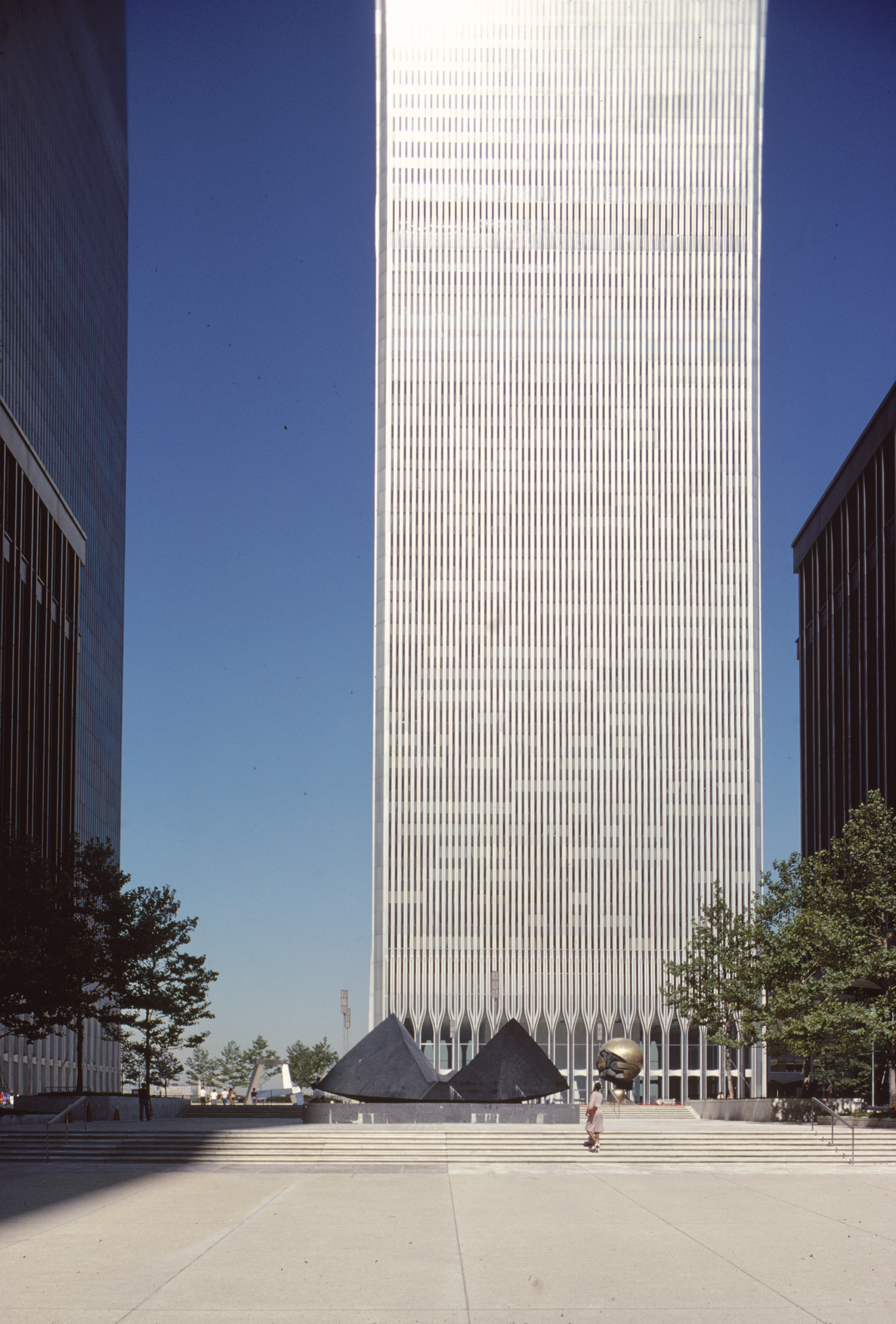
The plaza, seen in 1976. The World Trade Center Plaza Sculpture can be seen in the center.

Completed in 1972, Cloud Fortress occupied a minor plaza between buildings 4 and 5 that gave access from Church Street to the large Austin J. Tobin Plaza central to the complex of World Trade Center buildings.

The sculpture survived the immediate attacks and collapse of the adjacent buildings, but was demolished several days later by emergency efforts to access and clear the site and provide a stable area for heavy machinery to further access Austin J. Tobin Plaza. Following the sculpture's demolition, its remains were removed from Ground Zero along with the rest of the rubble.

In 2004, Nagare created a one-half replica and named it "Cloud Fortress Jr."("雲の砦Jr."). It is on display at Hokkaido Museum of Modern Art.

=== The World Trade Center Tapestry (1974) by Joan Miró and Josep Royo ===
Saul Wenegrat, former director of the art program for the Port Authority of New York, had suggested to Miró that he could make a tapestry for the World Trade Center, but the artist declined as he would only make the work with his own hands but had no experience of making a tapestry. However, after his daughter recovered from an accident in Spain, Miró agreed to make a tapestry for the hospital that had treated her as a token of his gratitude. Having learned the technique from tapestry maker Josep Royo, Miró made several other tapestries with Royo, including one for the World Trade Center, Woman for the National Gallery of Art in Washington, DC, and one for the Fundació Joan Miró.

The work was an abstract design, with bright blocks of colour, red, green, blue and yellow, with black elements and a light brown background. Made of wool and hemp, it measured 20 × 35 feet (6.1 × 10.7 m) and weighed 4 tons. It was completed in 1973 and displayed at a retrospective at the Grand Palais in Paris before being installed in New York City in 1974.

The Builders, completed by Jacob Lawrence in 1974. The painting was removed prior to the attacks.

=== The Builders (1974) by Jacob Lawrence ===
The Builders was a 30" x 22" 1/8" painting by Jacob Lawrence that was located inside the complex. It was removed at some point from 1974 to 2001, and was removed before the attacks, subsequently surviving.

=== Recollection Pond (1974) by Romare Bearden ===
Recollection Pond was a 61″ x 79″ tapestry by Romare Bearden that was located in the World Trade Center from 1974 until its destruction in 2001. It was also briefly displayed at the Metropolitan Museum of Art.

=== Entablature (1975) by Roy Lichtenstein ===
Entablature is a series of abstract paintings by Roy Lichtenstein. One of the paintings was destroyed in the attacks during the collapse of 7 World Trade Center, where it was located.

=== Fan Dancing with the Birds (1976) by Hunt Slonem ===
Fan Dancing with the Birds, completed by painter Hunt Slonem in 1976, was a wall mural located in Port Authority Executive Dining Room at 1 World Trade Center. It was one of the murals in the "fan dancing" series.

=== Sky Gate, New York (1978) by Louise Nevelson ===
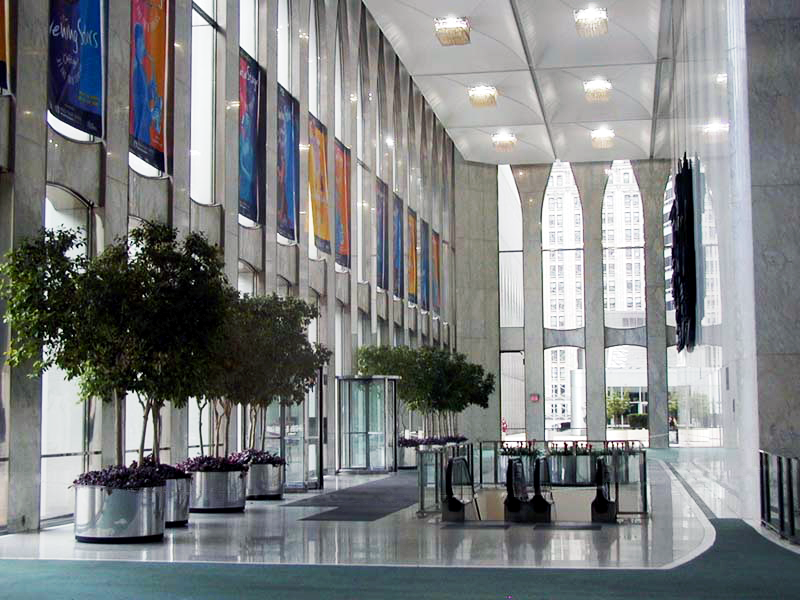
The lobby of 1 World Trade Center in 2000. Sky Gate, New York is the black object that can be seen hanging on the wall.

The sculpture was commissioned by Saul Wenegrat, director of the art program for the Port Authority of New York and New Jersey, for the World Trade Center and its "Percent For Art" program. The piece evolved through several redesigns before its dedication.

The largest work the sculptor had created to date, the wall piece was 32 feet wide, 17 feet tall and a foot thick — and comprised more than 35 segments, each a dark painted wood relief. Completed in 1977 or 1978 (reported variously), Sky Gate was dedicated at the mezzanine of One World Trade Center on December 12, 1978, overlooking Austin J. Tobin Plaza. Kitty Carlisle Hart, chair of the New York State Council on the Arts presided over the ceremony.

The sculpture was destroyed during the September 11 attacks and was not recovered.

=== Path Mural (1978) by Germaine Keller ===
Path Mural was a mural painted in 1978 by Germaine Keller, located in a corridor leading to an employees' cafeteria on the 43rd floor of Tower 1. It was destroyed in the attacks and never recovered.

=== Commuter Landscape (1979) by Cynthia Mailman ===
Commuter Landscape was a mural painted by Cynthia Mailman that was located at the WTC PATH station from 1979 until it was destroyed in the 1993 terror attack on the World Trade Center.

Pink Strelitzia, by Jim Dine. The painting was located in an unknown location within the complex.

=== Pink Strelitzia (1980) by Jim Dine ===
Pink Strelitzia, a paper etching, depicted a flower in a pot. The work, done by Jim Dine in 1980, was located at one of the buildings in the complex.

=== Union (1982) by Lancelot Samson ===
Union was a white marble sculpture located in the lobby of 2 World Trade Center. A gift from the Rotterdam World Trade Center, it was made by Lancelot Samson and unveiled in 1982 by the mayor of Rotterdam during a week-long visit to the US by Queen Beatrix. The statue sat atop a granite pedestal in one of the corners of the lobby, in the upper mezzanine.

=== Andrea Doria (1984) by Ronald Mallory ===
Andrea Doria, a painting completed by Ronald Mallory in 1984, was hung on one of the walls at the Windows on the World restaurant at the top of the North Tower. It was never recovered after the September 11 attacks.

=== The Third Circle (1986) by Al Held ===
The painting, done by Al Held, was located in the lobby of 7 World Trade Center from 1986 until its destruction in 2001.

=== The Asymptote (1988) by Carol Szymanski ===
The Asymptote was a large black-steel sculpture that was located on the lobby level of 7 World Trade Center from 1988 until the September 11 attacks. Completed by Carol Szymanski, the sculpture was able to be hung on a wall, but also could stand upright.

=== Crusading Euphoria (1989) by Ross Bleckner ===
Crusading Euphoria was a large painting of vertical lines in a pattern completed by Ross Bleckner in 1989. It was located in the lobby of 7 World Trade Center, and was never recovered after the September 11 attacks.

Union, as seen in the lobby of 2 World Trade Center.

=== 1993 World Trade Center Bombing Memorial (1995) by Elyn Zimmerman ===
Designed by Elyn Zimmerman, the memorial and its surroundings were intentionally made to resemble a bullseye when observed from a bird's-eye view, as it was situated directly above the ground zero site of the bombing, between One World Trade Center and the Marriott World Trade Center Hotel.

The interior of the fountain had purposely cracked, white granite walls that evoked the appearance of ancient tumulus markers—mounds of earth raised over graves.

=== Laestrygonia & Telepilus Laestrygonia II (1997) by Frank Stella ===
Laestrygonia and Telepilus Laestrygonia II were a series of 10-foot by 10-foot paintings completed by artist Frank Stella, that hung in the lobby of 7 World Trade Center until they were both destroyed in 2001. They were bought by Larry Silverstein in 1997.

=== World Trade Center Peace on Earth Sculpture (1998) ===
The World Trade Center Peace on Earth Sculpture was a large sculpture that stood on the West Street stairs that led to the plaza from 1998 to 2001.

=== New York Metamorphosis (1998) by Torild Stray ===
New York Metamorphosis is a charcoal drawing completed by Torild Stray that was briefly located on the 85th floor of 1 World Trade Center.

== See also ==
- Artwork damaged or destroyed in the September 11 attacks
