= Carol Szymanski =

Carol Szymanski is an American sculptor and multimedia artist with a special interest in language. She was a winner of the Rome Prize in the 1988–89 competition.

== Education ==
Szymanski received her Bachelor of Arts from the University of North Carolina at Chapel Hill in 1977. She earned her Master of Fine Arts from the San Francisco Art Institute in 1982. She was also a student of the Whitney Museum Independent Study Studio Program from 1982 to 1983.

== Grants and awards ==
In 1984, Szymanski received a New York State Council for the Arts Grant in Video. In 1988, the American Academy in Rome awarded Szymanski with the Rome Prize in sculpture. That same year, the National Endowment for the Arts recognized Szymanski with a fellowship in sculpture. In 2011, Szymanski was an artist in-residence at Cill Rialaig in County Kerry, Ireland. Szymanski's work at Cill Rialaig culminated in a group show entitled A Desert in the Ocean, curated by Catherine Howe. In 2012, Szymanski held a residency at CCA Andratx in Mallorca, Spain.

== Personal life ==
Szymanski is married to art critic Barry Schwabsky. They reside in New York City with their two daughters.
