= The Sphere =

Sculpture in New York City

Coordinates: 40°42′38″N 74°0′50″W

- German: Große Kugelkaryatide N.Y. (Note: German for "Great Caryatid Sphere N.Y.")
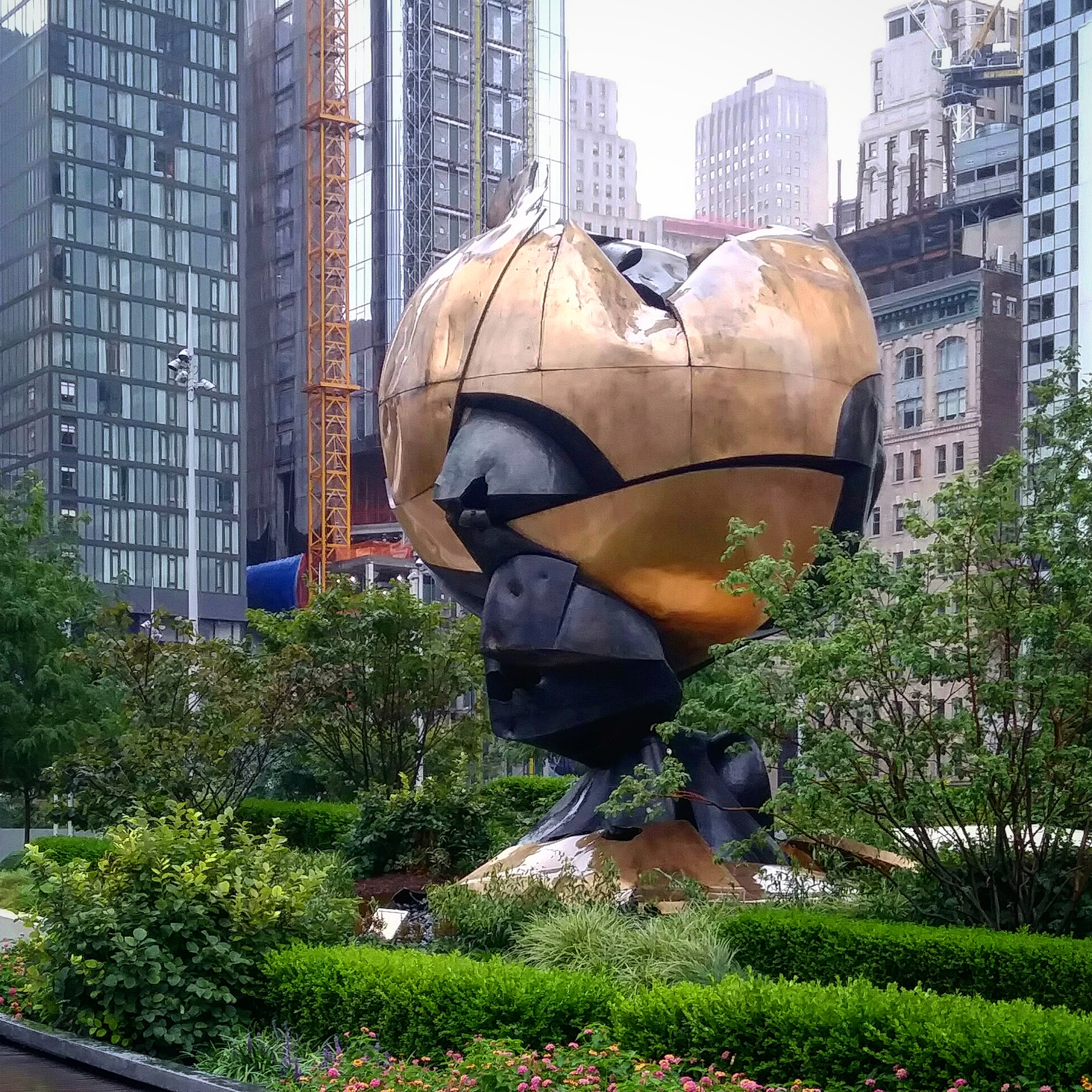
- The Sphere in Liberty Park in 2018, with damage at the top of the sculpture sustained during 9/11
- Artist: Fritz Koenig
- Year: 1968–1971
- Medium: Bronze sculpture
- Dimensions: 760 cm (25 ft); 520 cm diameter (17 ft)
- Condition: Damaged since 2001
- Location: Liberty Park, New York City
- Owner: Port Authority of New York & New Jersey (PANYNJ)

The Sphere (officially Große Kugelkaryatide N.Y., also known as Sphere at Plaza Fountain, WTC Sphere or Koenig Sphere) is a monumental cast bronze sculpture by German artist Fritz Koenig.

The world's largest bronze sculpture of modern times stood between the Twin Towers on the Austin J. Tobin Plaza of the World Trade Center in New York City from 1972 until the September 11 attacks. The work, weighing more than 20 tons, was the only remaining work of art to be recovered largely intact from the ruins of the collapsed Twin Towers. After being dismantled and stored near a hangar at John F. Kennedy International Airport, the sculpture was the subject of the 2001 documentary Koenig's Sphere. Since then, the bronze sphere has become a memorial for the attacks.

The sculpture was installed in Battery Park between 2002 and 2017, when the Port Authority of New York and New Jersey moved it to Liberty Park, overlooking the September 11 Memorial and its original location. The sculpture, rededicated at its permanent location on August 16, 2017, has been kept in the badly damaged condition it was found in after the September 11 attacks.

== Artwork ==
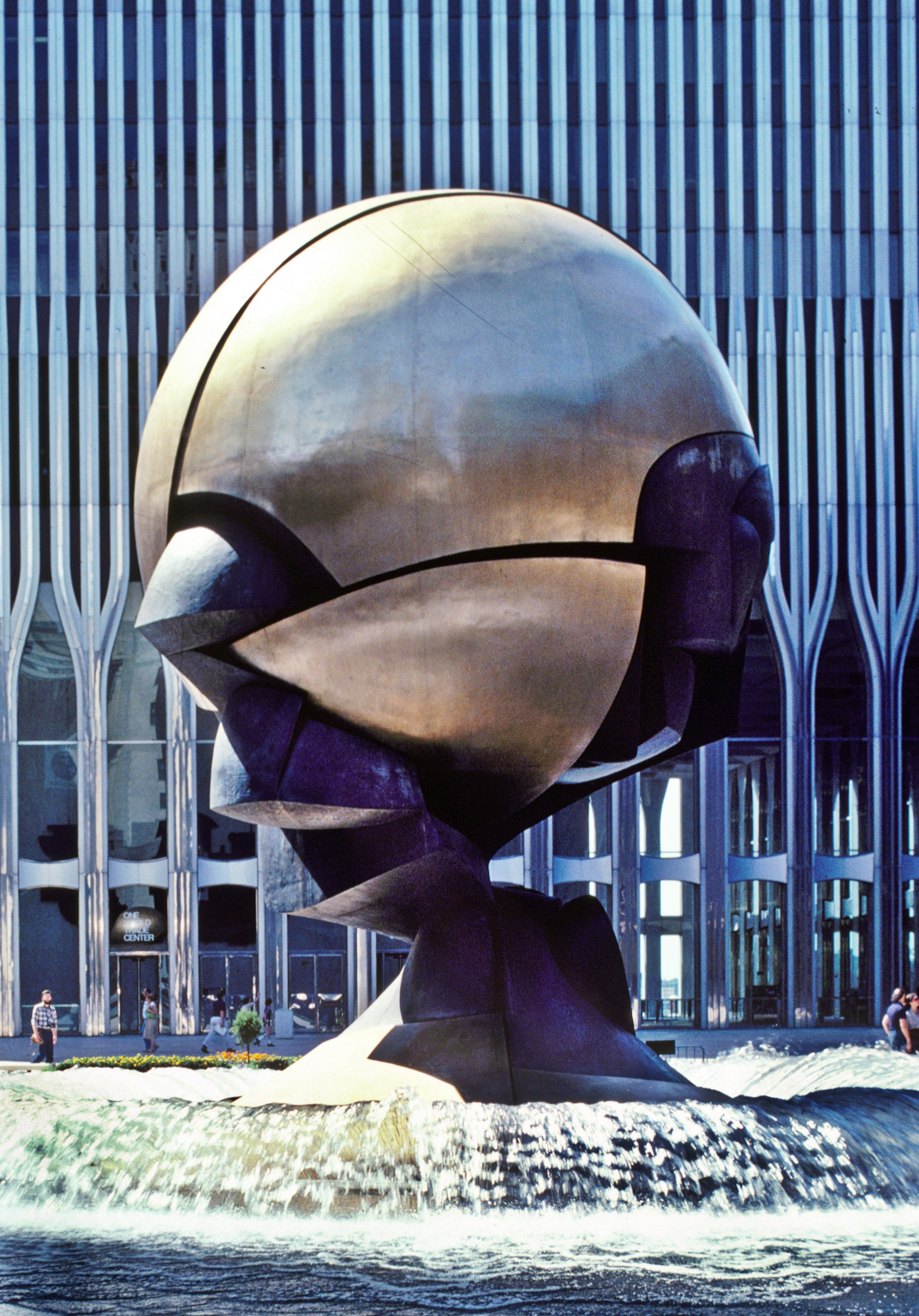
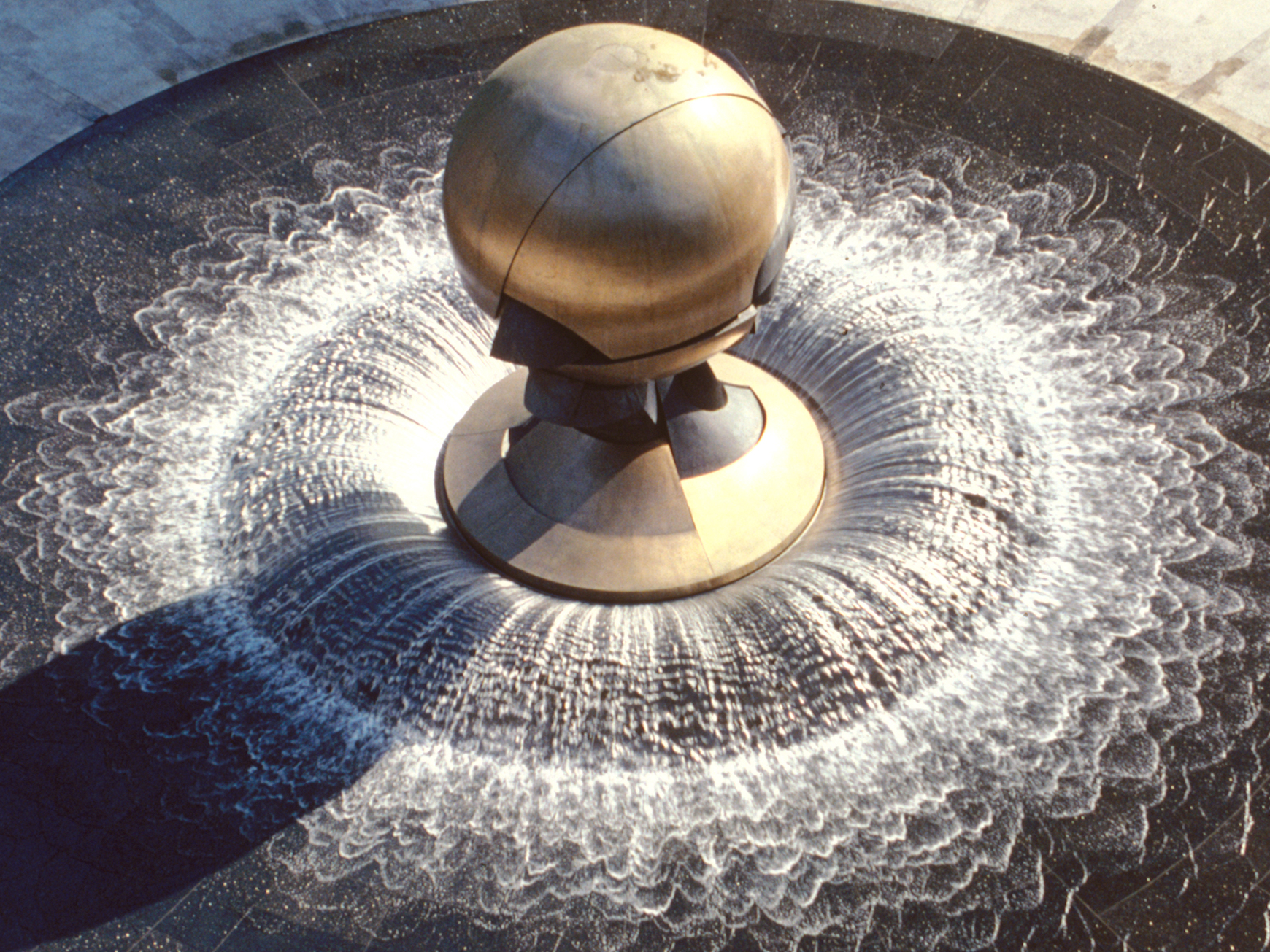
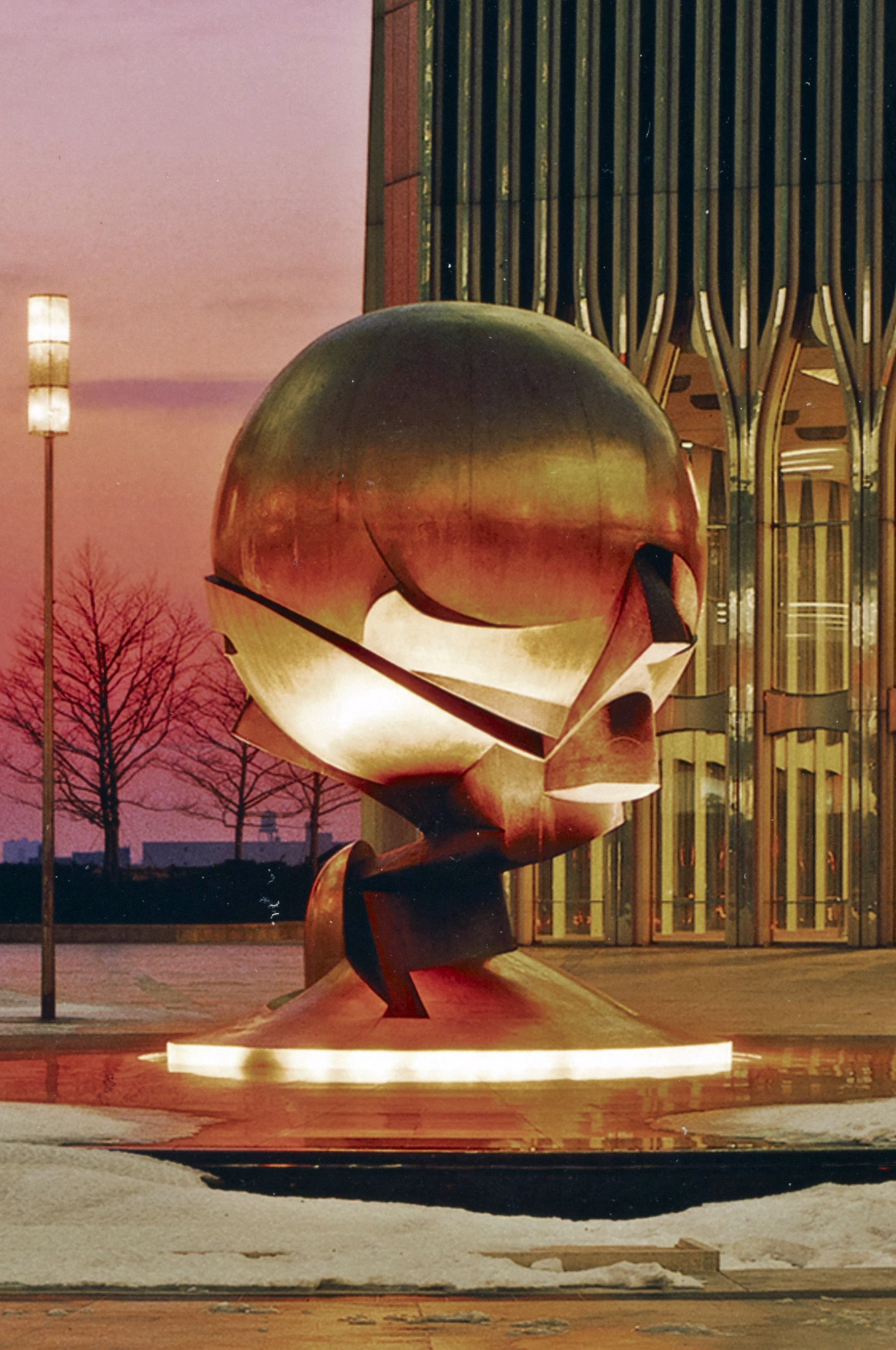
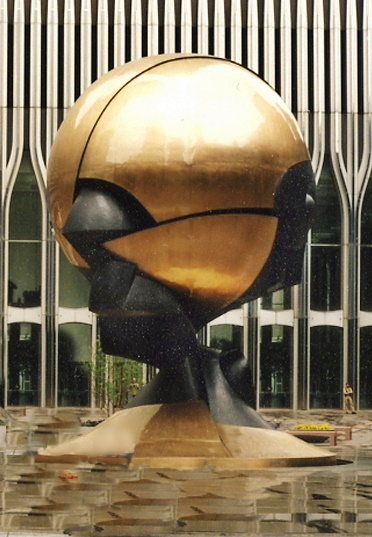
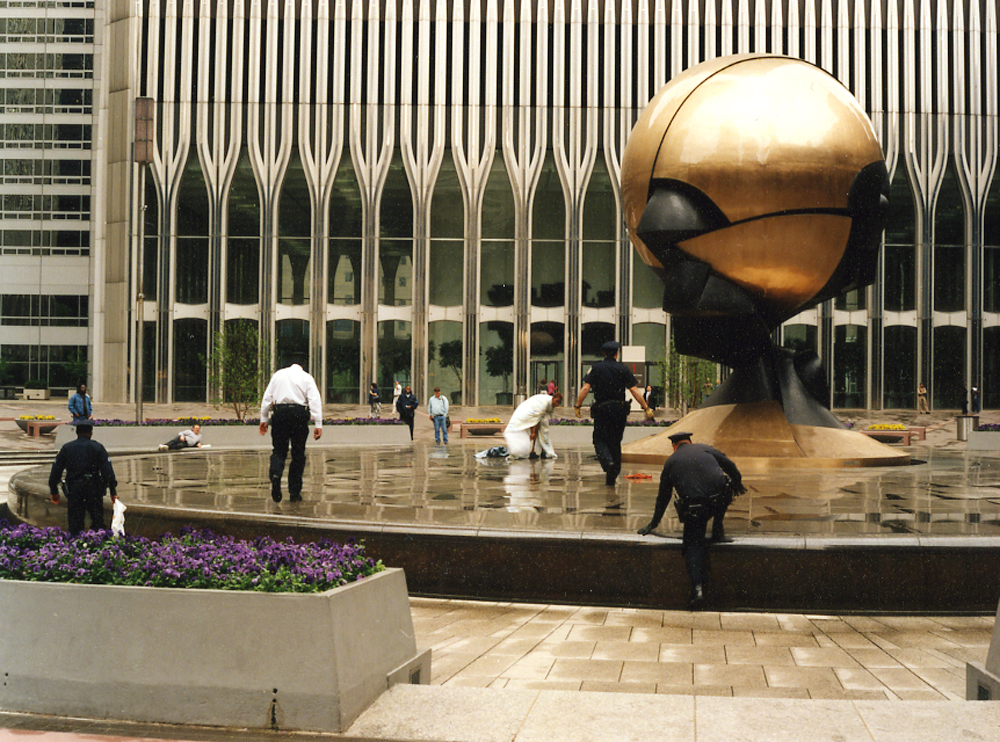
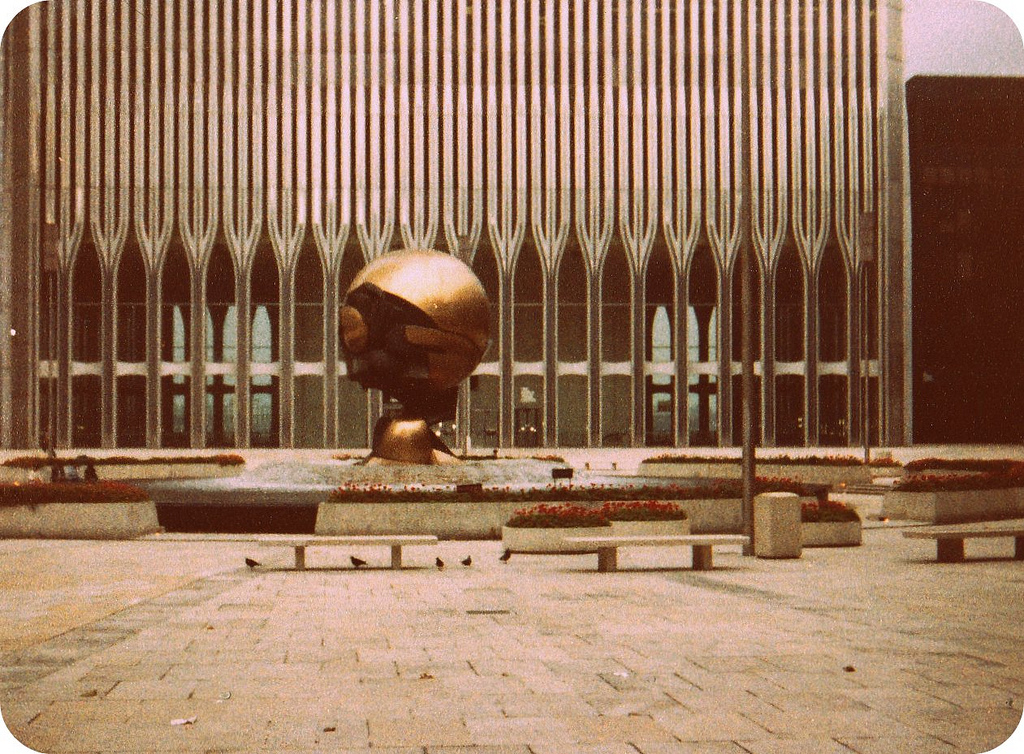
The Sphere on Austin J. Tobin Plaza (1972–2001)

The creation of the originally titled Große Kugelkaryatide N.Y. / Great Caryatid Sphere N.Y. (catalogue raisonné Sk 416) dates to the 1960s and early 1970s. At that time Fritz Koenig was established as an artist in the United States.

After the World Trade Center's architect Minoru Yamasaki had seen the work of the German sculptor in the George W. Staempfli Gallery in New York, he asked Koenig to create a sculpture including a fountain for the space between the World Trade Center's twin towers, which were then under construction. In 1967, Koenig was awarded the contract by the Port Authority of New York and New Jersey as the client and property owner of the development.

The Sphere falls into Koenig's creative phase of various caryatids, in which Koenig stages a struggle with constricting or burdensome geometrizing masses. With his sculpture Koenig wanted to mark a formal contrast to the skyscrapers. Mounted on a porphyry disk measuring 3.3 feet (1.0 m) high, with a diameter of 82 feet (25 m), the sphere rotated once around its axis within 15 minutes. One hundred and sixty gallons of water (600 liters) per second flowed out of the nozzles of the associated Plaza Fountain. The well water was sprayed in a ring running around the sphere onto a flat surface adjacent to the sphere. This should give the impression that the spherical caryatid rises out of the water. The highly complex technology of the system was designed at the Institute for Hydrology and River Basin Management at the Technical University of Munich, where Koenig had been a lecturer since 1964. The largest bronze sculpture of modern times weighs over twenty tons, is 25 feet (7.6 m) high and has a diameter of 17 feet (5.2 m). Koenig called it his "biggest child".

The sculpture was made between late 1968 and late 1971 in Ganslberg near Landshut, where Fritz Koenig lived. The work on the plaster model in its original size required the construction of a new workshop hall near Koenig's homestead and actual studio. Koenig was supported in the production of his work of art by his long-time assistant Hugo Jahn and the South Tyrolean sculptor Josef Plankensteiner. From 1969 the plaster elements of the sphere, dismantled into 67 individual parts, were cast in bronze in the Munich art foundry Hans Mayr. Then the individual bronze segments with a total combined weight of seventeen tons were brought to the workshop in Ganslberg and assembled there.

After four years of planning and manufacturing, the finished sculpture was dismantled again and transported to the port of Bremen with low loaders and trucks. The bronze elements of the sphere and the base were put together again on site so that Koenig's sculpture as a whole could set off by sea across the Atlantic to New York in a specially made, oversized wooden transport box. In 1971, The Sphere was finally installed on the World Trade Center's plaza and ceremoniously unveiled a little later. The sculpture, including the fountain, marked the center of the development and was a popular meeting place for New Yorkers. The work of art was dedicated to "world peace through trade". The original name "Große Kugelkaryatide N.Y." did not catch on with the New Yorkers. They called the spherical sculpture "Koenig Sphere" or simply "The Sphere".

== Relocation after 9/11 ==
=== Immediately after the attacks ===
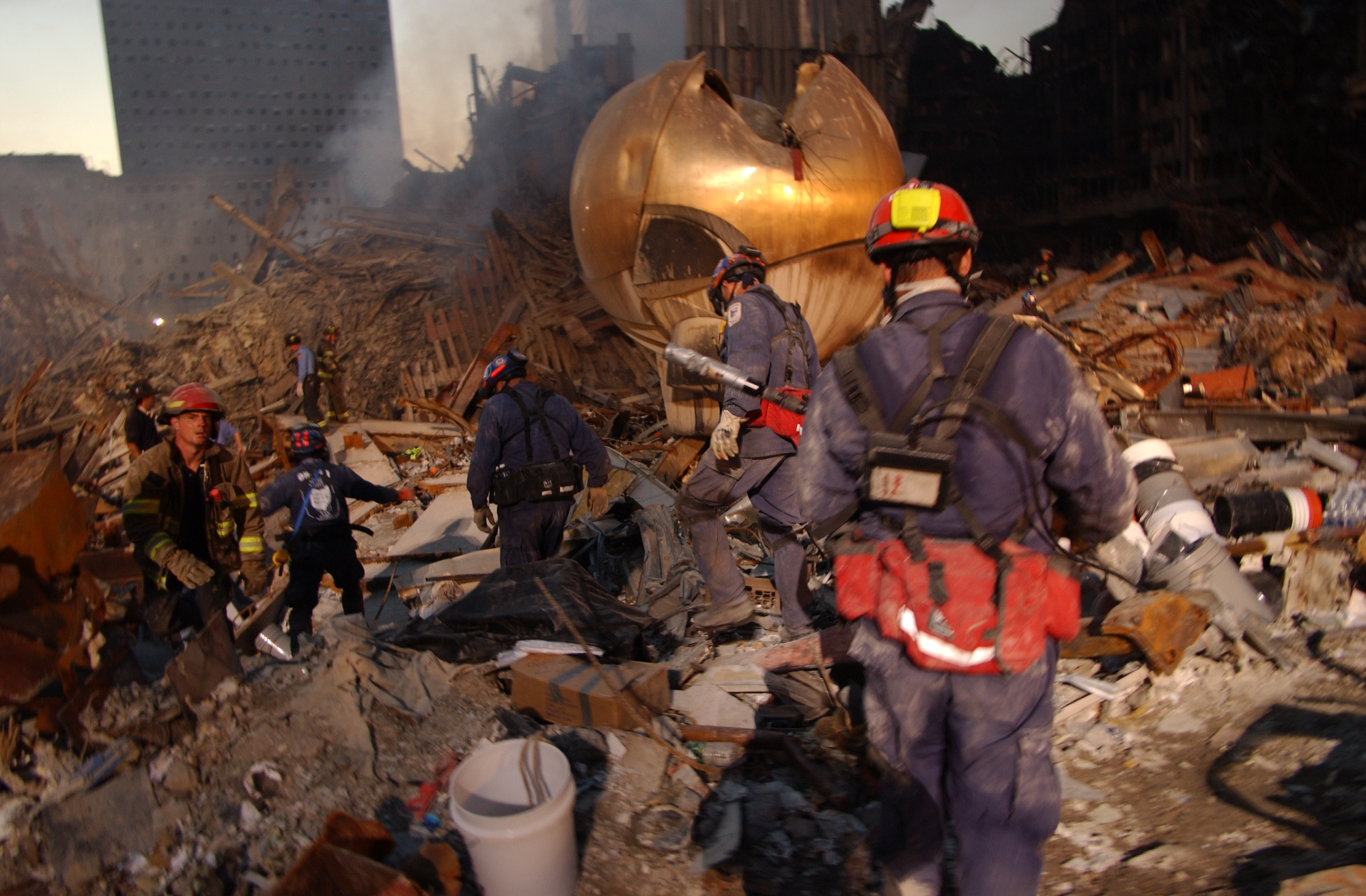
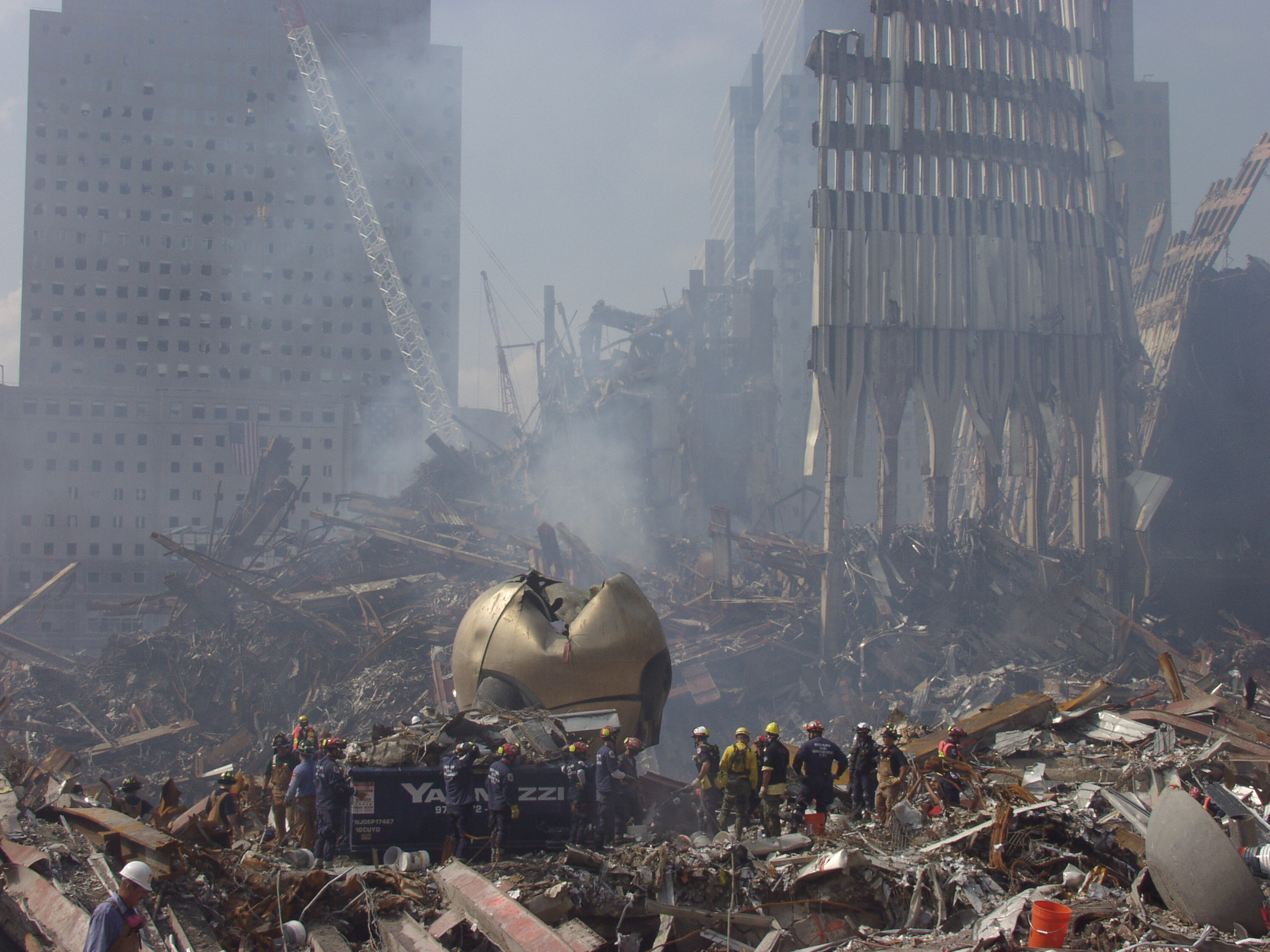
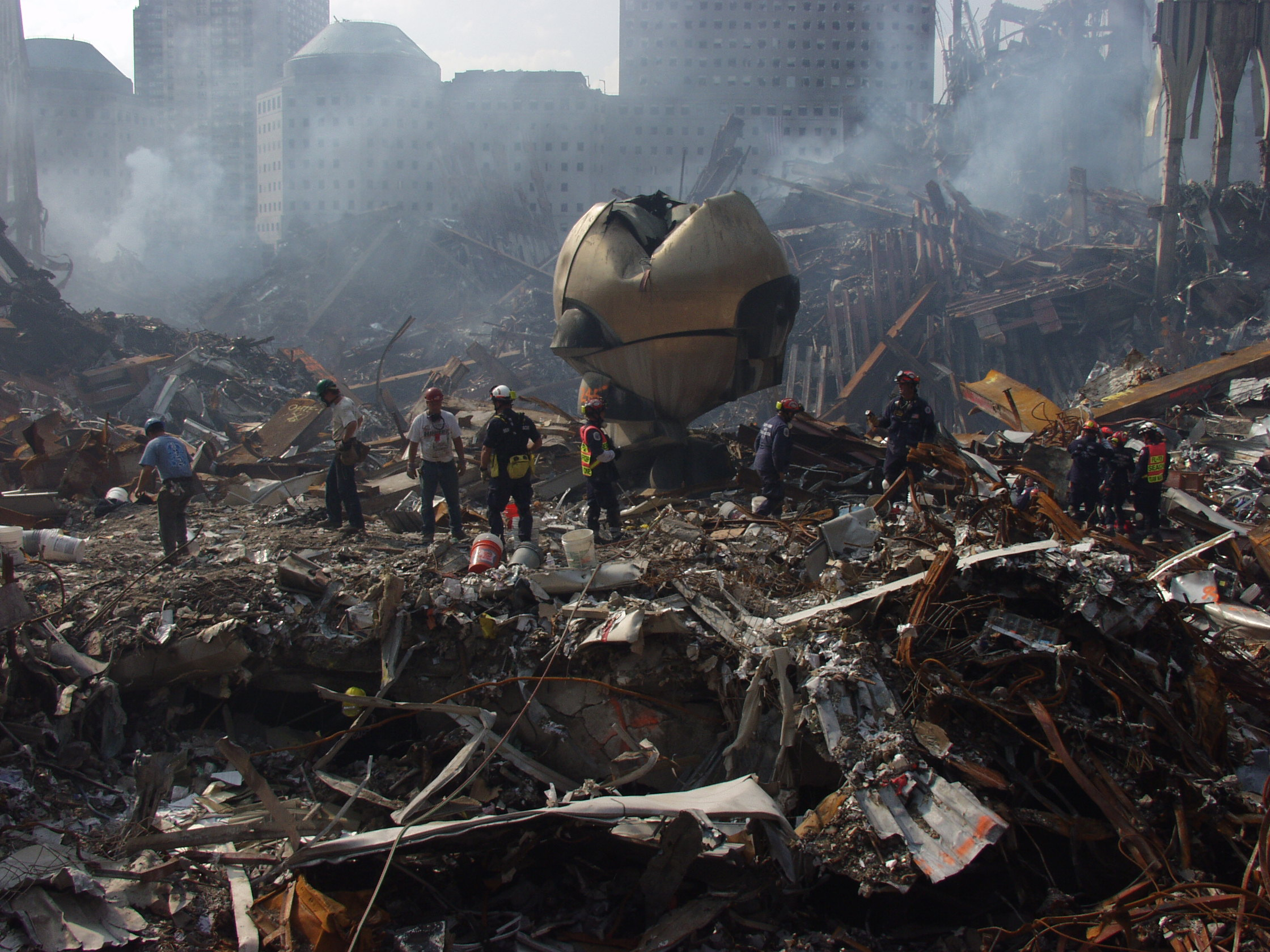
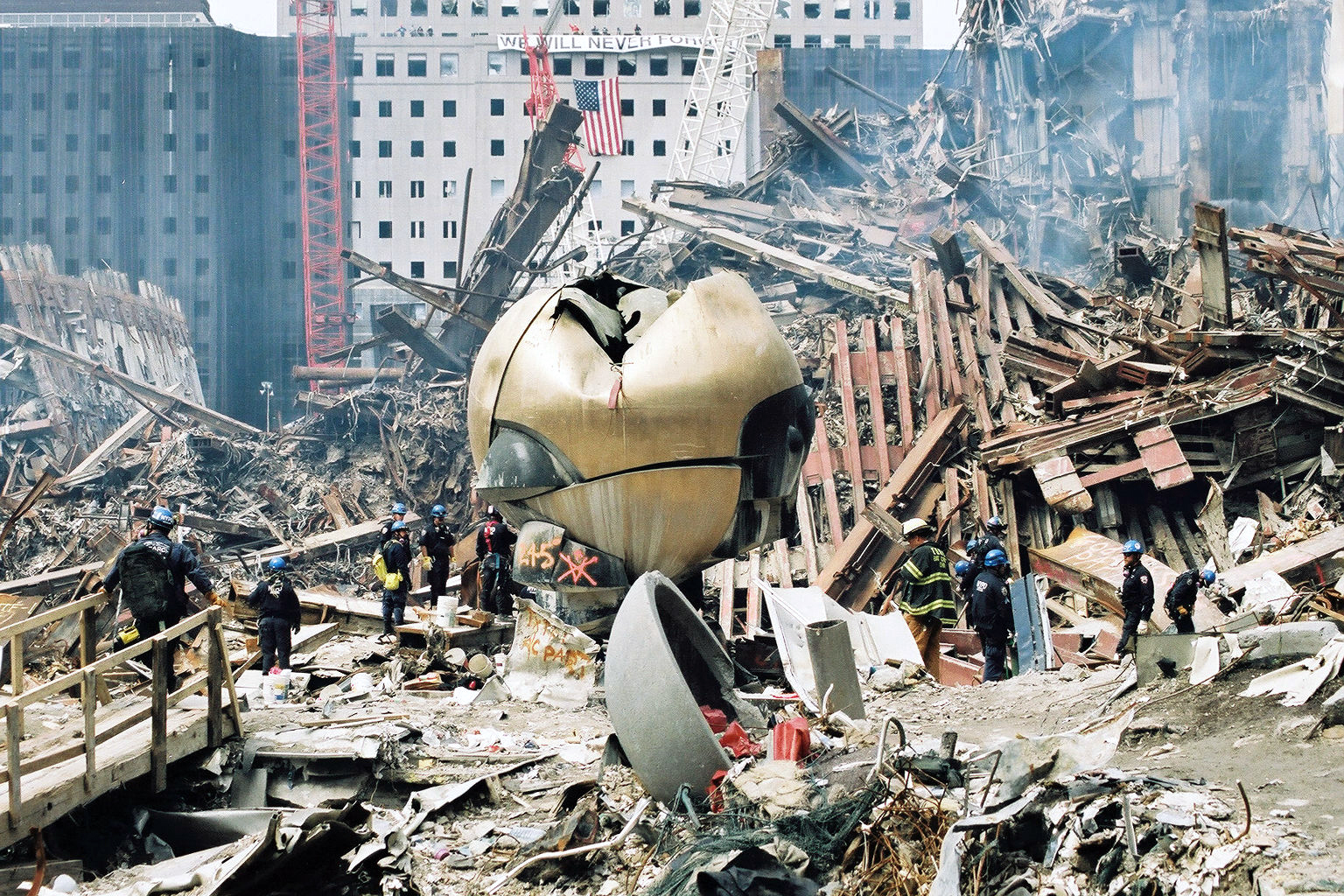
The Sphere amidst the ruins of 9/11 (2001)

After the September 11 attacks, upon recovery from the rubble pile, the sculpture was dismantled and sent to storage near John F. Kennedy International Airport. Its extraction had been widely covered in local news media in the New York metropolitan area. As it was a memorable feature of the Twin Towers site, there was much discussion about using it in a memorial, especially since it seemed to have survived the attacks relatively intact.

German film director Percy Adlon, who had twice previously devoted films to Koenig, made Koenigs Kugel (Koenig's Sphere) at a time when the sculpture's fate was still uncertain. In the film, the artist and the director visit Ground Zero five weeks after the attacks as the former retells the story of its creation. At first, Koenig opposed reinstalling The Sphere, considering it "a beautiful corpse".

=== Relocation to Battery Park ===
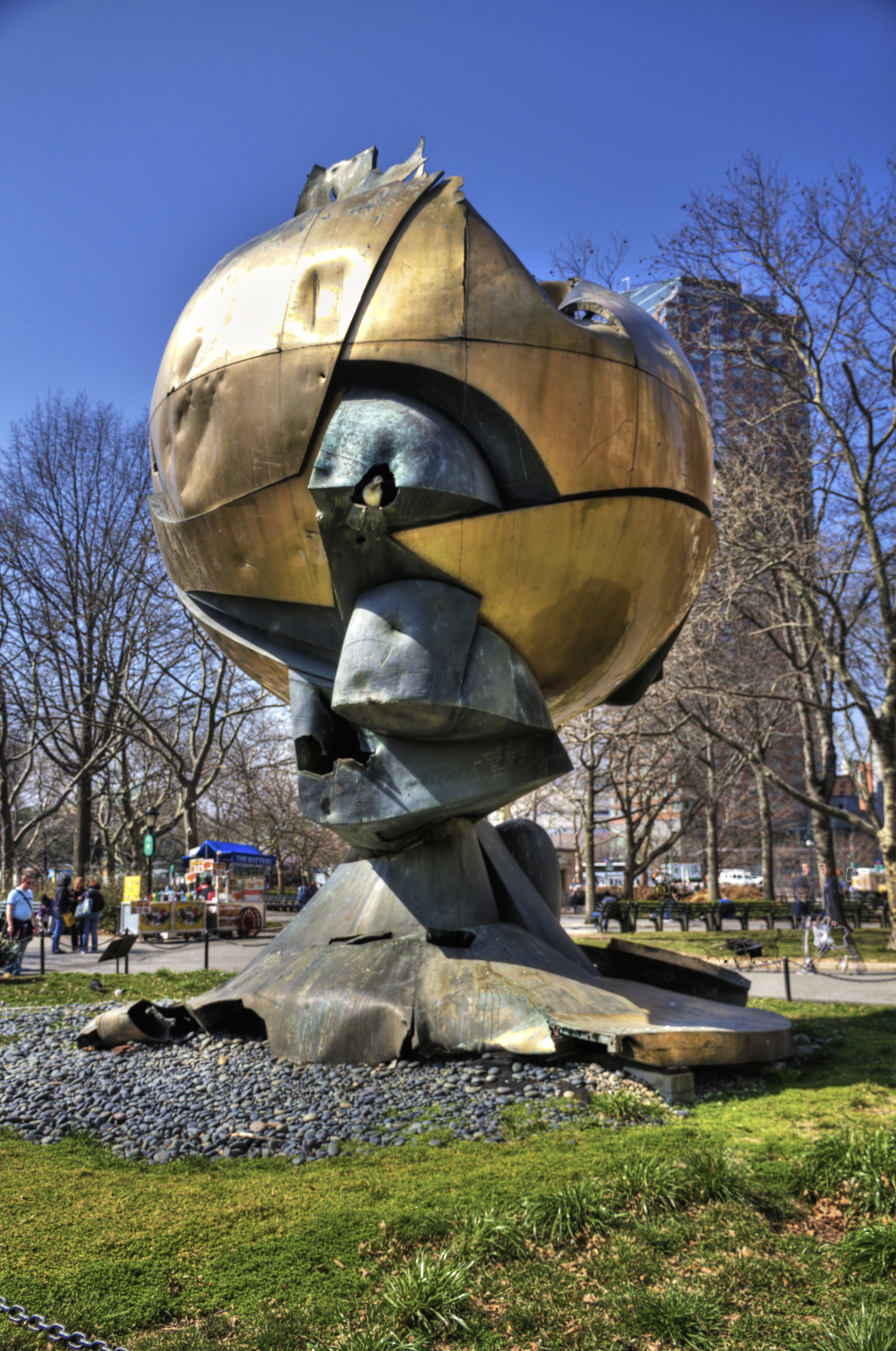
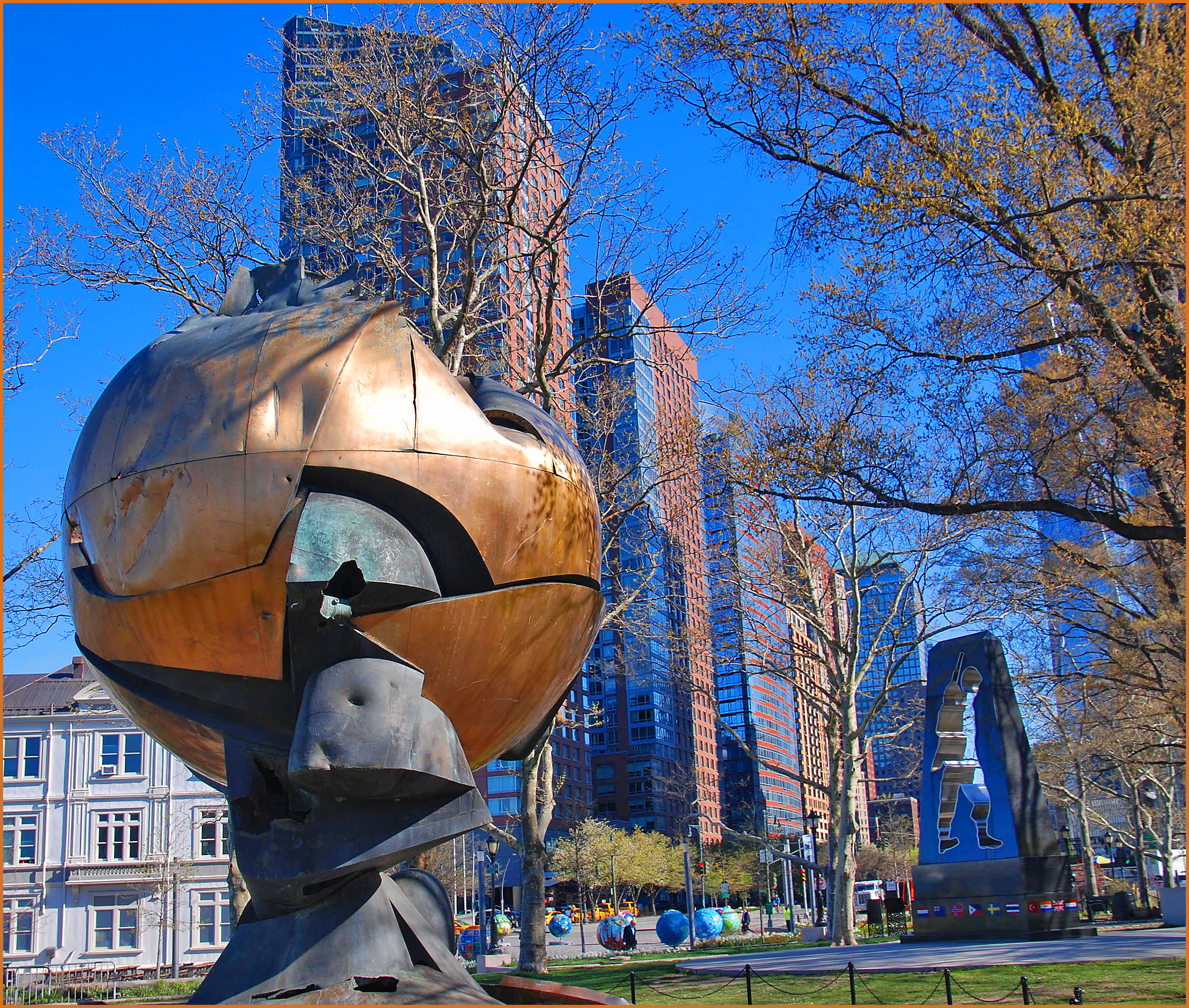
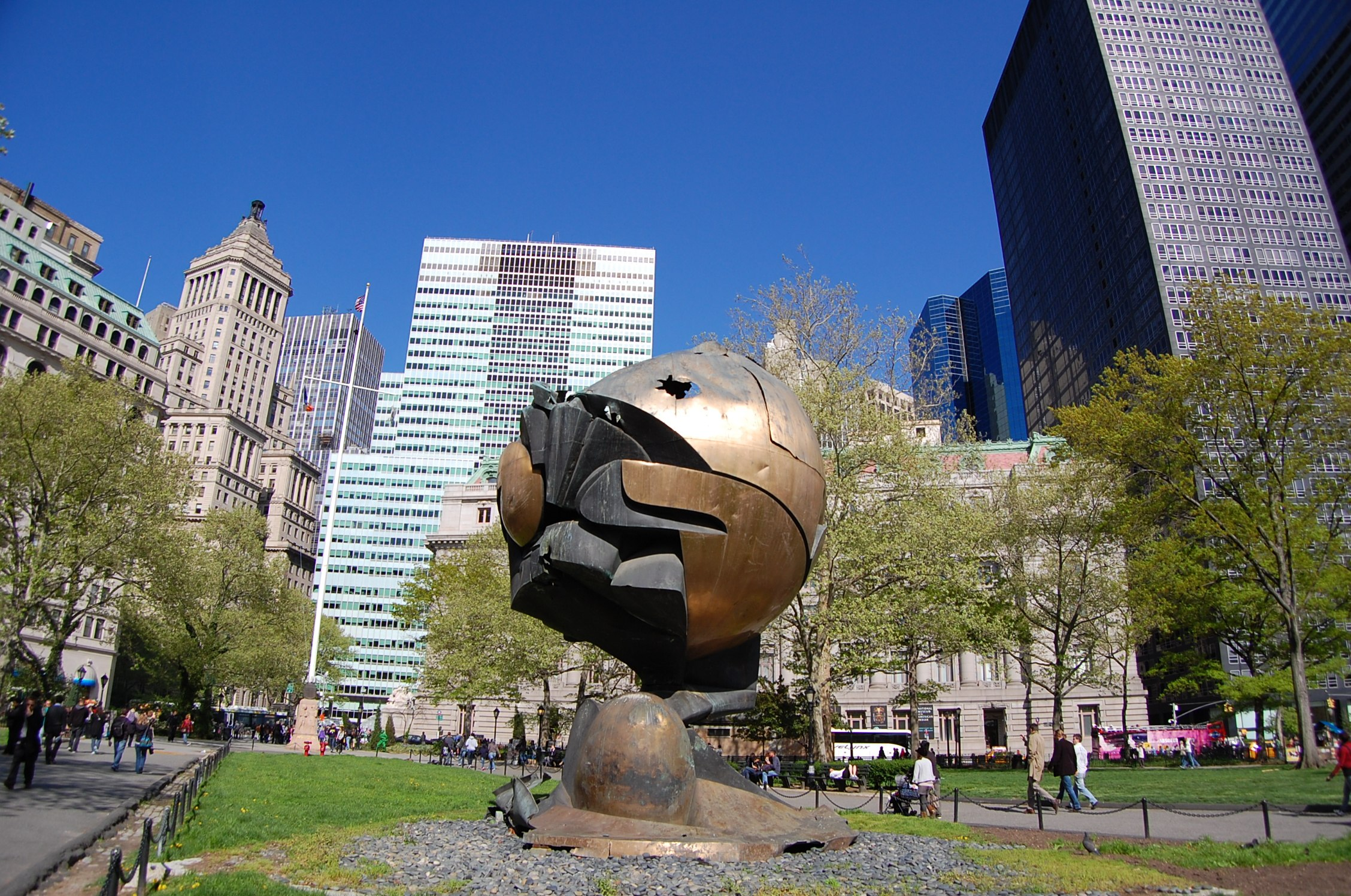
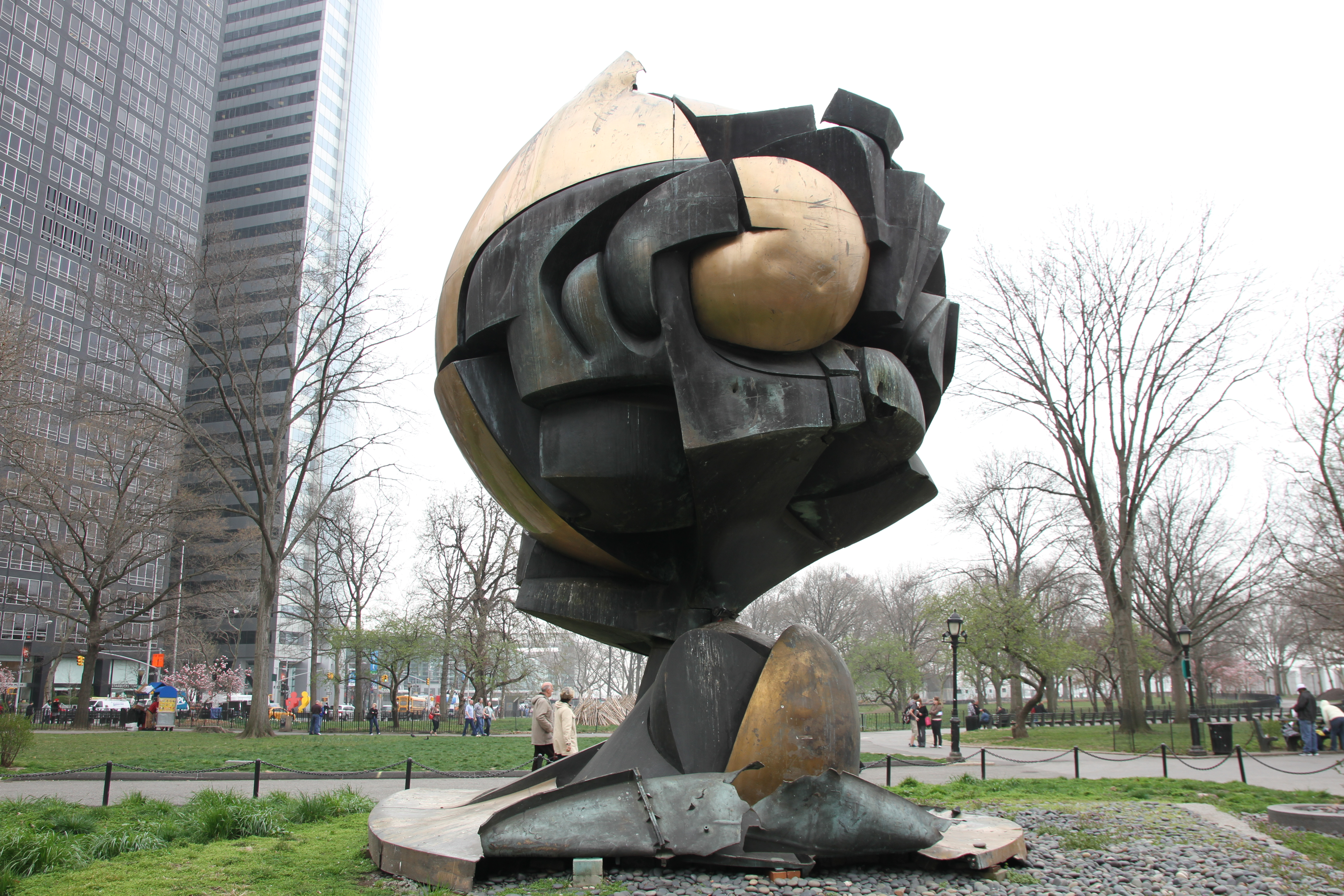
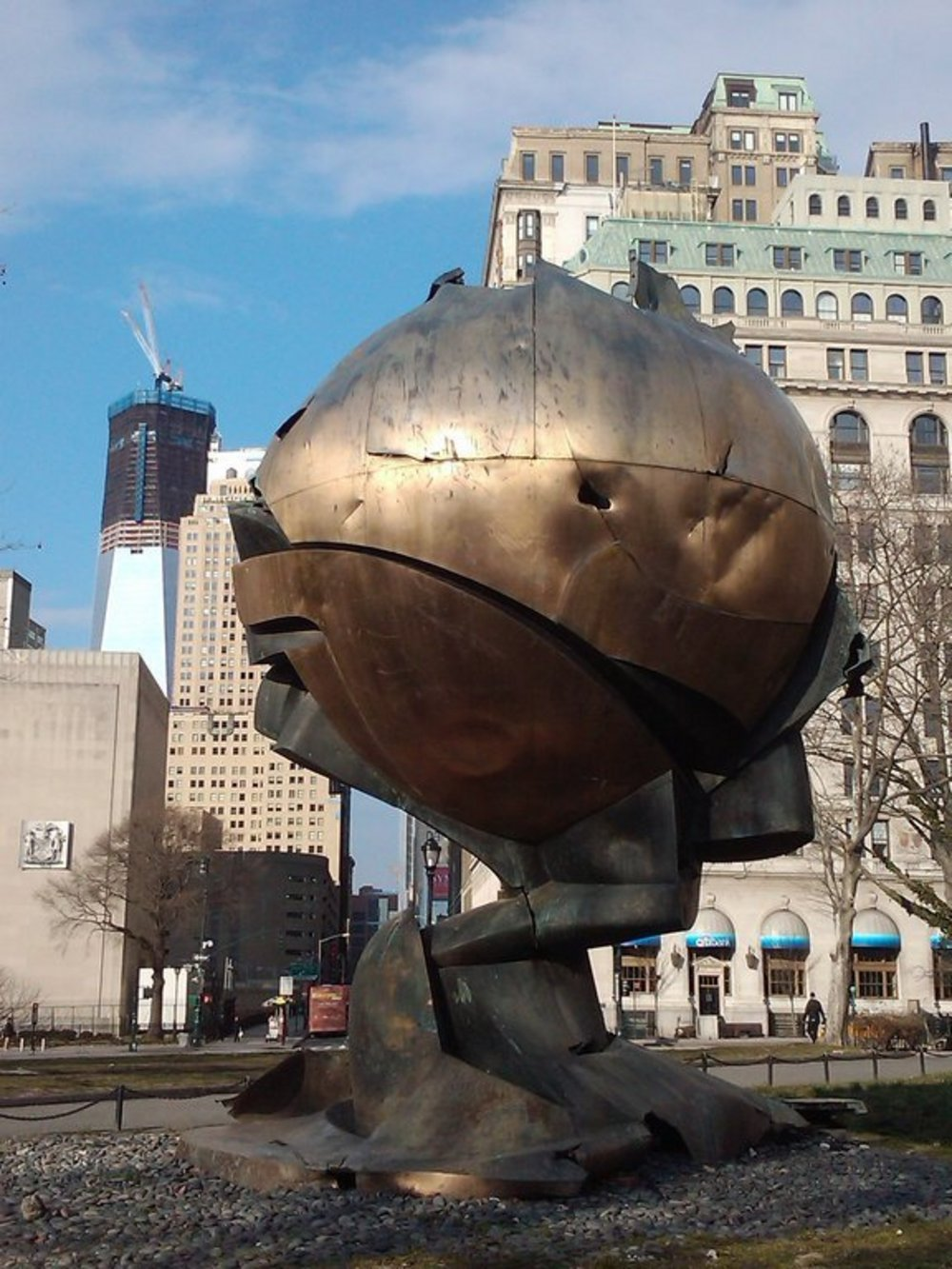
The Sphere in Battery Park (2002–2017)

The sculpture was eventually returned to Manhattan, and on March 11, 2002, six months to the day after the attacks, it was re-erected in Battery Park, near the Hope Garden, several blocks away from where it once stood. Koenig himself supervised the work; it took four engineers and 15 ironworkers to create a new base. Mayor Michael Bloomberg, his predecessor Rudy Giuliani and other local officials spoke at a ceremony rededicating it as a memorial to the victims. "It was a sculpture, now it's a monument", Koenig said, noting how the relatively fragile metal globe had mostly survived the cataclysm. "It now has a different beauty, one I could never imagine. It has its own life – different from the one I gave to it."

A plaque alongside The Sphere read as follows:

For three decades, this sculpture stood in the plaza of the World Trade Center. Entitled The Sphere, it was conceived by artist Fritz Koenig as a symbol of world peace. It was damaged during the tragic events of September 11, 2001, but endures as an icon of hope and the indestructible spirit of this country. The Sphere was placed here on March 11, 2002 as a temporary memorial to all who lost their lives in the terrorist attacks at the World Trade Center.

This eternal flame was ignited on September 11, 2002, in honor of all those who were lost. Their spirit and sacrifice will never be forgotten.

=== Relocation to Liberty Park ===
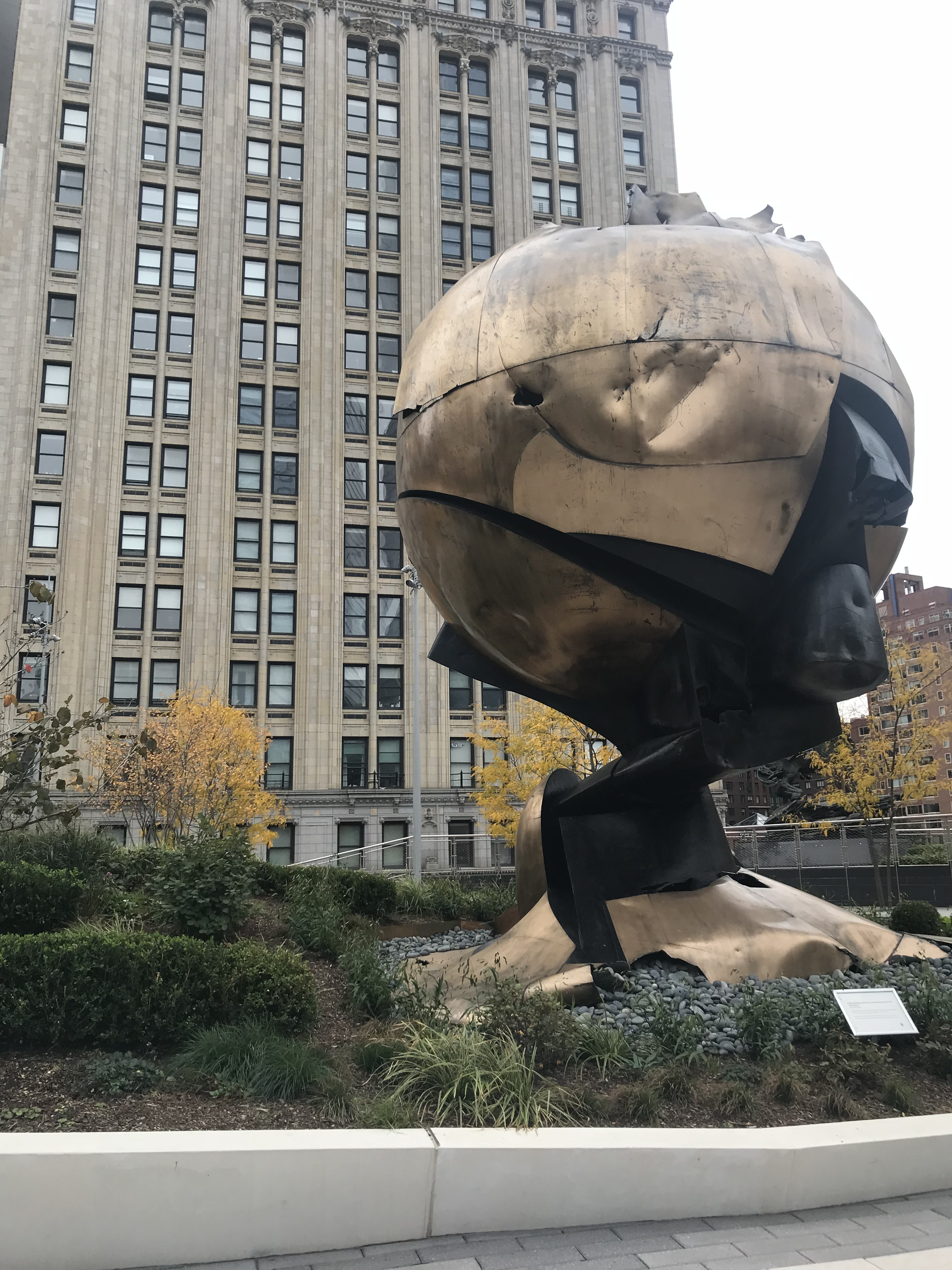
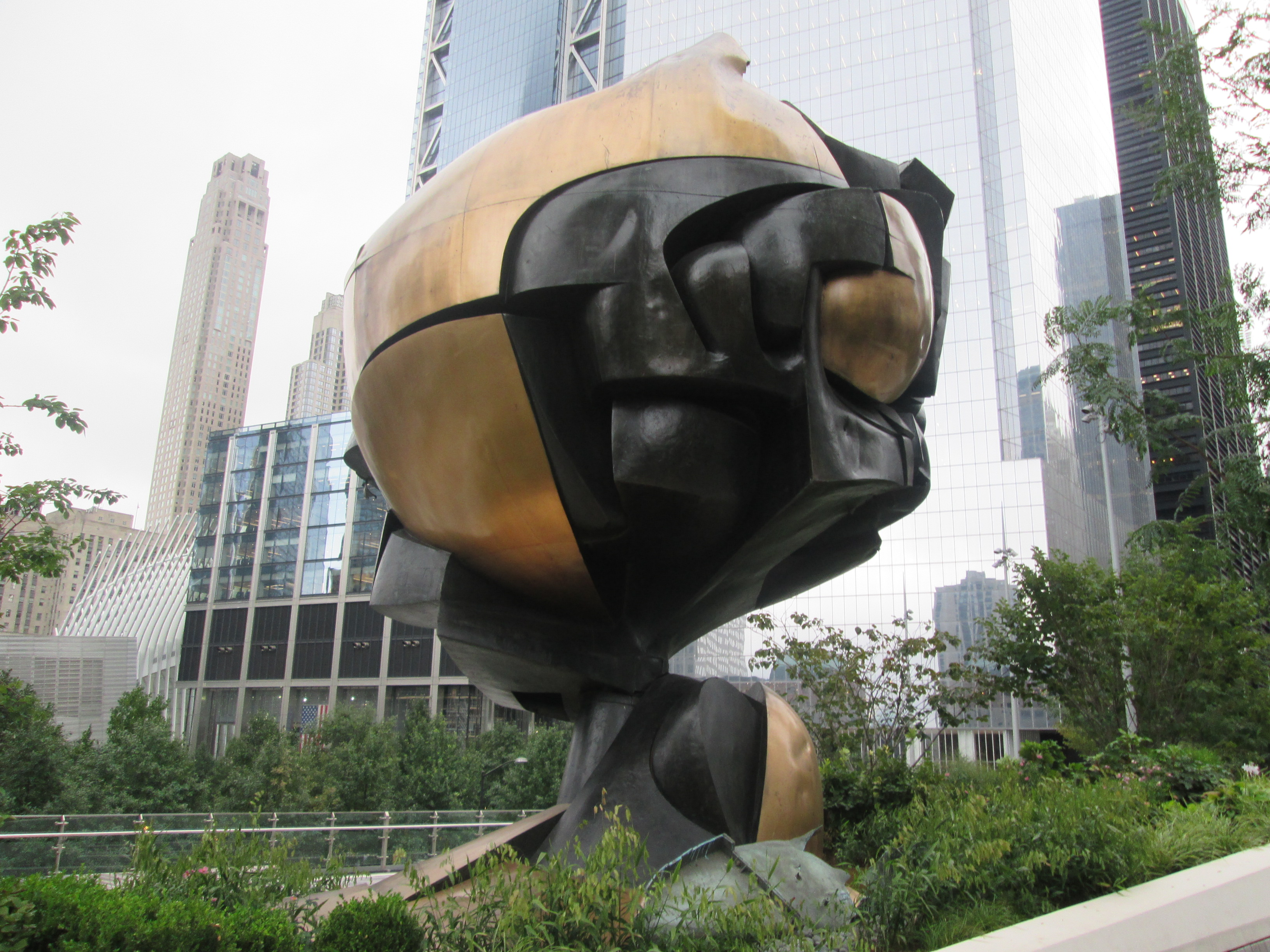
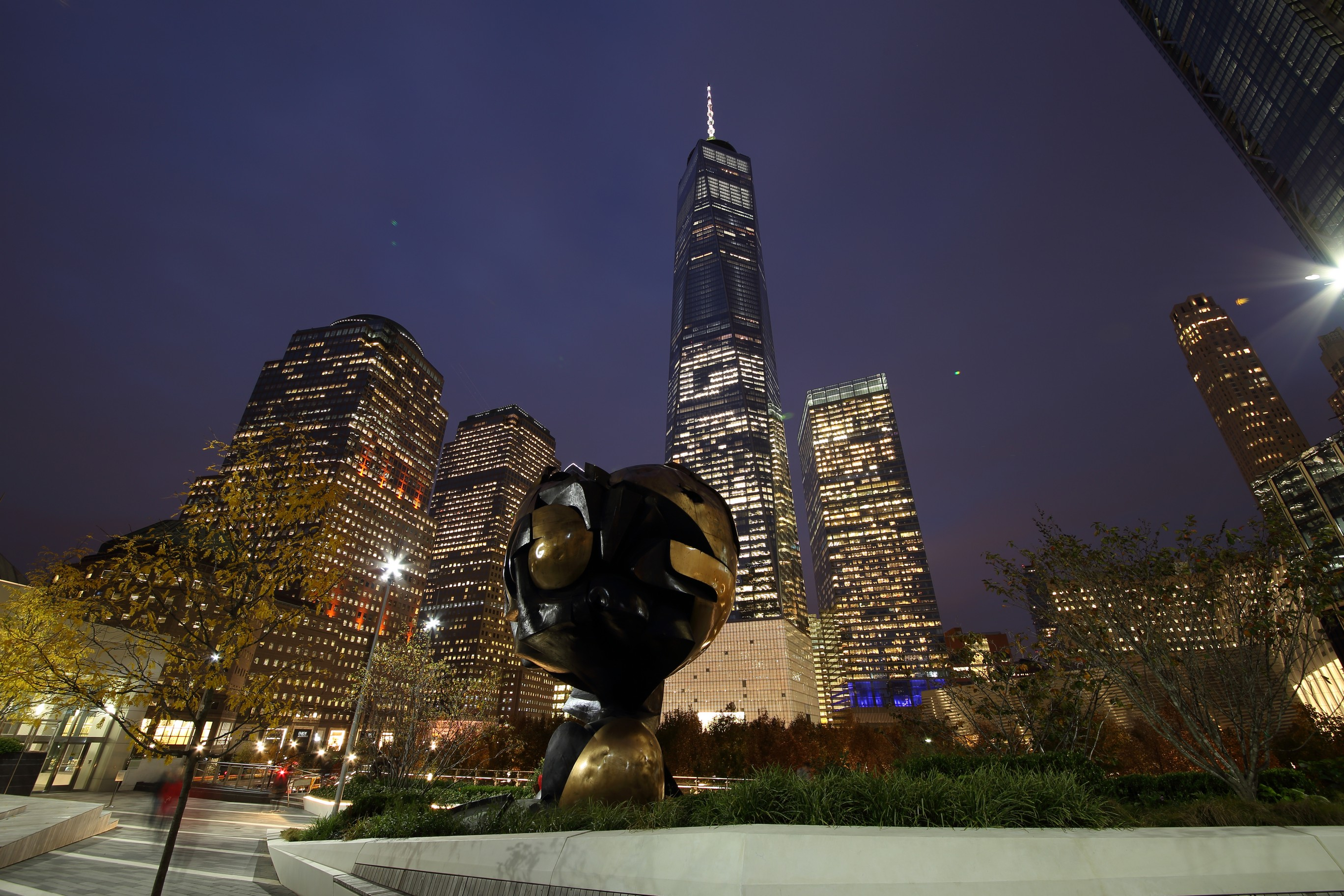
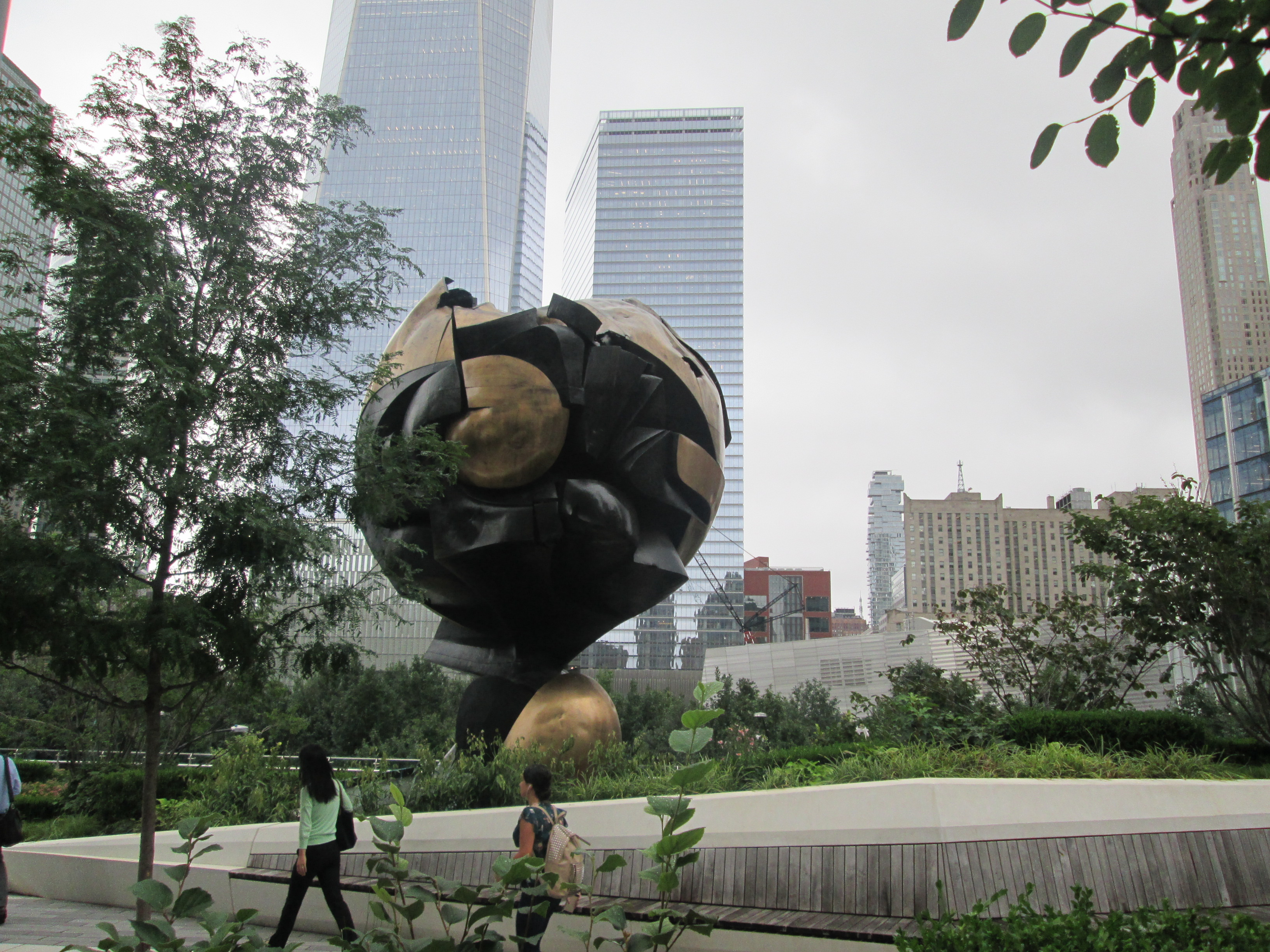
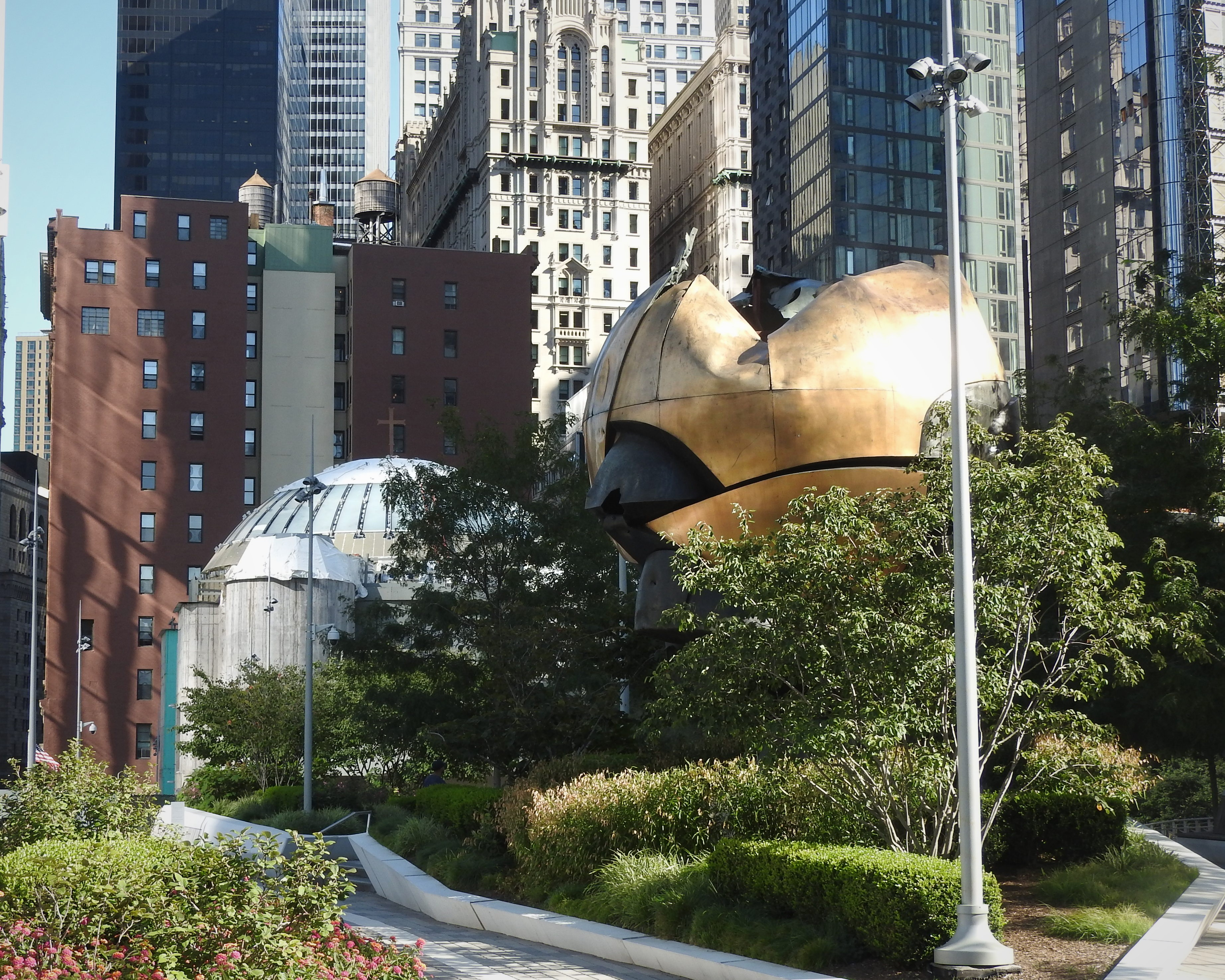
The Sphere in Liberty Park (since 2017)

According to NYC Parks spokeswoman Vickie Karp, the city was looking to relocate The Sphere in summer 2012, when construction began to restore Battery Park's lawn, requiring the sculpture to be moved. The Port Authority of New York and New Jersey (PANYNJ), which owns The Sphere, considered placing the sculpture in Liberty Park, located between the 90 West Street building and the World Trade Center Memorial site. Liberty Park would not be constructed until at least 2014, so a temporary location was needed to place The Sphere. By February 2011, PANYNJ had not made an official final decision on where to place the sculpture once Battery Park construction commenced, requiring the sculpture to be moved, possibly into storage.

An online petition created by 9/11 families demanding the return of The Sphere to the 9/11 Memorial gained more than 7,123 signatures as of March 23, 2011. Officials from the 9/11 Memorial stated that they did not want any 9/11 artifacts cluttering the 8-acre memorial plaza. On June 28, 2012, PANYNJ expressed support for the effort to move The Sphere to the plaza of the National September 11 Memorial & Museum. After a public comment by Michael Burke during a meeting of the Board of Commissioners, Executive Director Patrick J. Foye stated:

The point that Mr. Burke made resonates with many people in New York and New Jersey and many people here at the Port Authority, especially given the fact that 84 members of the Port Authority family were killed on 9/11. This is an artifact that survived and was affected by the horrors of 9/11, and placing it on the memorial plaza, we think, is entirely appropriate.

— Patrick J. Foye, head of Port Authority, who supported making The Sphere a part of the 9/11 Memorial, The Washington Post

When Liberty Park opened in June 2016, the question had not been resolved. On July 22, 2016, the Port Authority voted to move the sculpture to Liberty Park, and in August 2017, PANYNJ relocated the sculpture to Liberty Park and build a new base for the sculpture there. On September 6, 2017, the Sphere was unveiled in its permanent home in Liberty Park, overlooking the World Trade Center site. The Port Authority of New York and New Jersey held a ceremony at Liberty Park on November 29, 2017, to mark its return to the World Trade Center site.

== Media ==
=== Documentary ===
In his documentary Koenigs Kugel – der deutsche Bildhauer Fritz Koenig im Trümmerfeld von Ground Zero ("Koenig's Sphere"), the German director Percy Adlon shows Koenig's encounter with his badly damaged work of art a few days after the September 11 attacks and its subsequent conversion to a memorial. In it, Koenig recalls The Sphere's origin and talks about transience and the transformation of art following the attacks.

=== Book ===
A limited edition of the book THE SPHERE – Vom Kunstwerk zum Mahnmal / THE SPHERE – From Artwork to Memorial was published in June 2021, the 50th anniversary of the sculpture's installation.

== See also ==
- Plop art
- Artwork damaged or destroyed in the September 11 attacks
