= Fritz Koenig =

German sculptor (1924-2017)

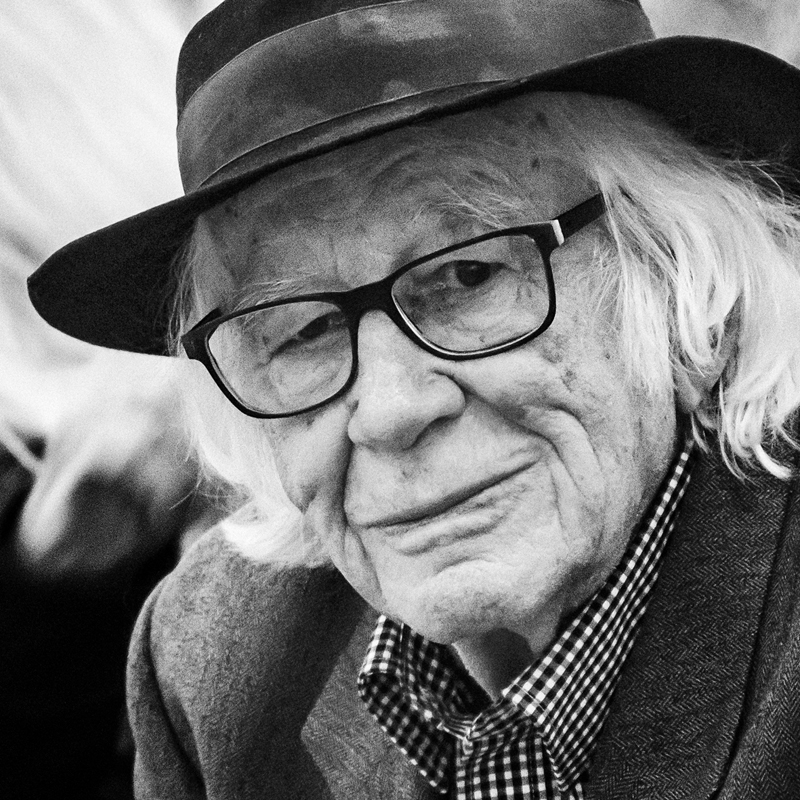
- Fritz Koenig in 2015
- Born: 20 June 1924; Würzburg, Bavaria, Germany
- Died: 22 February 2017 (aged 92); Landshut, Bavaria, Germany
- Education: Academy of Fine Arts, Munich
- Known for: The Sphere

Fritz Koenig (German pronunciation: [ˈfʁɪts ˈkøːnɪç]; 20 June 1924 – 22 February 2017) was a German sculptor, considered one of the most important international German sculptors of the 20th century.

Koenig's main work and most famous work is The Sphere. The world's largest bronze sculpture of modern times once stood on the plaza beneath the two World Trade Center towers in Lower Manhattan until the terrorist attacks on 11 September 2001. The artifact, weighing more than 20 tons, was the only remaining work of art to be recovered largely intact from the ruins of the collapsed twin towers after the attacks. With its damage deliberately left unrepaired, the sculpture now stands in Manhattan's Liberty Park as a memorial to the victims of the 11 September attacks.

Koenig's oeuvre includes other works, including other memorials. Numerous works by Koenig and his renowned collections with artifacts from antiquity to the 20th century are located in the Koenigmuseum in Landshut, which he designed and established by the Fritz and Maria Koenig Foundation.

== Biography ==
Koenig was born in Würzburg on 20 June 1924. His family moved to Landshut in 1930, when he was six years old. He entered the Oberrealschule (today the Hans-Leinberger-Gymnasium) in 1942, and in the same year, he was drafted into the Wehrmacht and sent to the Eastern Front, where he was taken as a prisoner of war.

In the years after World War II, he studied art at the Academy of Fine Arts in Munich starting in 1946 and graduating in 1952. In 1951, he studied in Paris on a scholarship. In 1957, Koenig was selected to receive a scholarship from the Villa Massimo in Rome. In 1958, Koenig presented at the XXIX. Biennale in Venice and designed the West German pavilion at the world exhibition Expo 58 in Brussels with his art. In 1959, Koenig was able to exhibit at the II. documenta in Kassel. In addition, the Günther Franke gallery in Munich presented Koenig's first solo exhibition. Also in the same year, 1959, Koenig married his wife Maria, who was born in Landshut (1921-2010). In 1960, Koenig and his wife bought an agricultural property in the Altdorf district of Ganslberg near Landshut. In 1961, a house, studio and stables were built according to his ideas. Rural life made it possible for the passionate rider and horse lover to set up his own thoroughbred Arabian breed, which achieved worldwide fame and was also of great importance for his artistic work.

Koenig achieved his final international breakthrough in 1961 with a solo exhibition at the Staempfli Gallery in New York. Exhibitions at documenta III and XXXII. Bienniale followed in 1964. In the same year he was appointed professor for sculptural design at the Technical University of Munich, where he participated in the training of architects until 1992. From 1967 to 1971, Koenig created his main work that led him to world fame: At the behest of the World Trade Center architect Minoru Yamasaki and on behalf of the Port Authority of New York and New Jersey, Koenig created a fountain system with the bronze sculpture Große Kugelkaryatide N.Y. (later known as The Sphere) for the World Trade Center in New York City, which was still under construction.

Over the decades, Fritz Koenig created a diverse set of work that he was able to keep in representative casts in his spacious country estate in Ganslberg. In addition, Koenig owned many works of art from a wide variety of cultures and periods from antiquity to the 20th century.

Koenig was a board member of the (West) German Association of Artists from 1961 to 1972. Fritz Koenig was also the recipient of numerous awards, including the Bavarian Maximilian Order for Science and Art and the Order of Merit of the Federal Republic of Germany.

Koenig died on 22 February 2017, at the age of 92 on his country estate in Ganslberg.

== Work ==
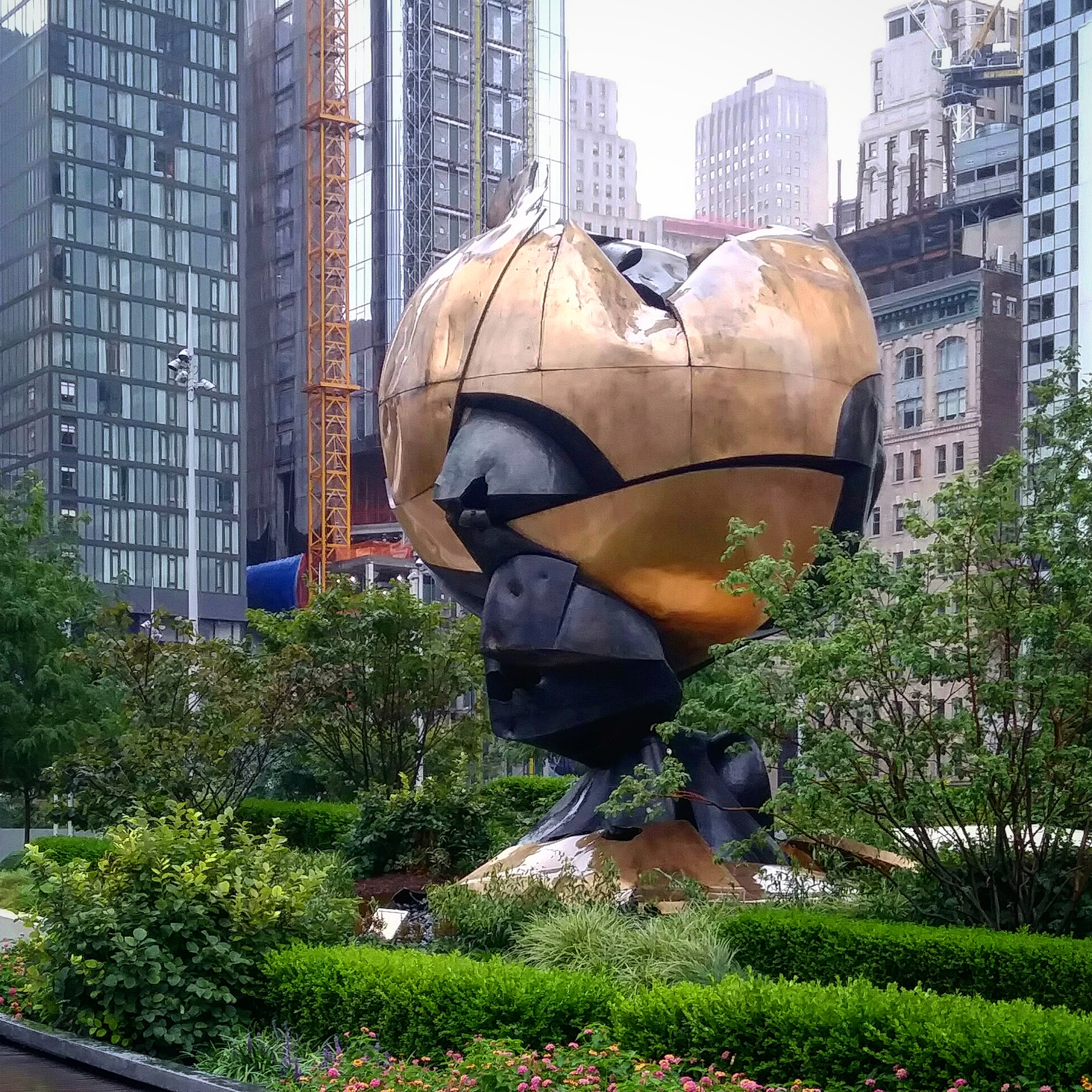
The Sphere in 2018, in its current location of Liberty Park

In his work, Koenig was primarily concerned with the elementary "existence" of humans and animals in the area of tension between religiosity and mythology. The human being in the fragility of his existence, in the field of tension between love, death and impermanence, was another major leitmotif of Fritz Koenig's work. The combination of geometric forms like cuboids, spheres and bodies and limbs of cylinders to create new, organic-looking objects cast in metal made Koenig known in the early 1950s.

=== Major works ===
Koenig's major works include The Sphere, now displayed in Liberty Park in New York City, a memorial at Mauthausen concentration camp (1983) and a memorial to victims of the Munich massacre during the 1972 Summer Olympics. Many works are installed in public space, such as at the seat of the President of Germany, Schloss Bellevue, at German embassies in Washington, D.C., London, Madrid and Dakar, and the Würzburg Cathedral.

==== Works in public space ====
Title	Number	Year	Material	Size	Location
Große Kugelkaryatide N.Y. (The Sphere)	Sk 416	1967/1971	Bronze	7,64 × 5,20 m	Liberty Park in New York City
Klagebalken	Sk 988	1994/1995	Granite (monolith)	1,85 × 10 × 1,02 m	Olympiapark in Munich
Das apokalyptische Weib und die Sieben Schlangen	Sk 268	1962/1963	Bronzevergoldet	5,80 m	Facade of Maria Regina Martyrum in Berlin
Große Flora L	Sk 637	1977/1978	Bronze	2,00 × 2,00 m	Embassy of Germany, London
Wall with writing for Tor der Toten	Sk 281	1962/1963	Bronze	2,70 × 3,00 × 0,50 cm	Monument for soldiers in Rheinberg
Flora III	Sk 479	1971	Bronze	2,40 m	Residenz, Munich
Große Zwei V (Paolo und Francesca)	Sk 566	1973	Bronze	2,62 × 1,645 × 0,65 m	Neue Pinakothek, Munich
Große Zwei IV	n.n.	1973/1982	Bronze	n.n.	Klinikum in Munich-Bogenhausen
Großes Votiv K	Sk 284	1962/1964	Bronze	2,00 × 1,90 × 1,50 m	Luisenstraße 33 in Munich
Große Säulenkaryatide B	Sk 383	1966/1967	Bronze	4,70 m	Berliner Platz in Braunschweig
Großes Rufzeichen II	Sk 486	1970/1972	Bronze	7,50 m	Schiffgraben in Hannover
Große Biga	Sk 1021	2000/2001	Bronze	3,13 × 1,90 × 1,79 m	Alte Pinakothek in Munich
Heiliger Martin und der Bettler	Sk 1058	2014	Bronze	0,66 m	Baptismal chapel of St. Martin in Landshut
Hauptportal, Schöpfung	Sk 279	1962/1967	Bronze	5,50 × 3,50 m	Würzburg Cathedral
Große Kugelkopfsäule IF	Sk 441	1971	Bronze	4,38 m	University Medical Center Freiburg
Große Säulenkaryatide R	Sk 386	1966/1968	Bronze	9,00 m	University Medical Center Regensburg
Brunnenstein	Sk 968	1992	Granite	4,00 m	Campus Weihenstephan in Freising

==== Works in KOENIGmuseum ====
Many works by Koenig are held by the KOENIGmuseum that the artist and his wife founded in Landshut in 1993.

Werk	Title	Number	Year	Material	Size
	Großer Janus	Sk 847	1984/1985	Iron	2,52 × 0,675 × 0,675 m
	Große Zwei XXV	Sk 790	1982/1983	Bronze	3,10 × 2,30 × 1,40 m
	Großer Trieb	Sk 970	1993/1999	Granite (monolith)	6,70 m
	Großes Bouquet III	Sk 391	1967/1994	Bronze	1,76 m

== Reception ==
Koenig is regarded internationally as one of the most important German sculptors of the 20th century. Ludwig Spaenle, minister of culture of Bavaria, wrote that he was a truly great artist, who will be remembered by his works in the world, be it Berlin, Madrid or New York City. The Corriere della Sera compared Koenig to Michelangelo, and a reviewer from the Frankfurter Allgemeine Zeitung saw a connection to Donatello.

== Documentary ==
Several documentaries coveres Koenig and his work, including:

- Dagmar Damek: Fritz Koenig und seine Welt. BR, 1974
- Percy Adlon: Fritz Koenig. BR, 1979–2002
- Percy Adlon: Fritz Koenigs Kugel – Der deutsche Bildhauer Fritz Koenig im Trümmerfeld von Ground Zero. BR, 2002
- Astrid Bscher: Koenigs New Yorker Kugel – Eine Skulptur wird zum Symbol. BR, 2021

== Exhibitions in 2024 ==
Several exhibitions have been held in 2024, the centenary of his birth:

- Fritz Koenig – Lebensstationen, KOENIGmuseum, Landshut
- Fritz Koenig in New York at the Goethe-Institut, New York
- Fritz Koenig in Venedig – A Century in Motion by Art Biennale in Venice
- Fritz Koenig und die Antike, Glyptothek, Munich
