= Artwork at the World Trade Center (2001–present) =

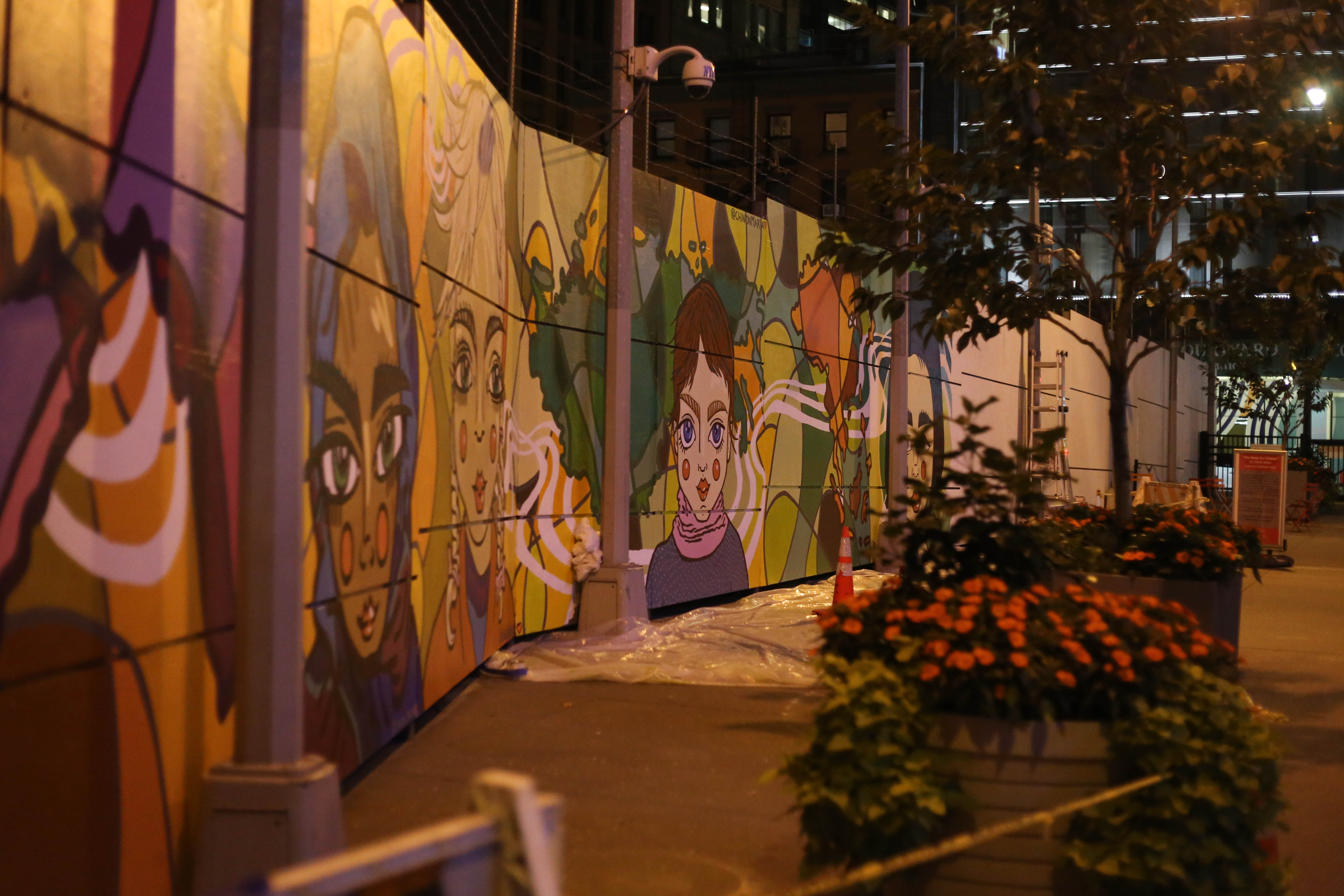
Paintings in the World Trade Center

The new World Trade Center complex features public art by a variety of artists.

== One World Trade Center ==
=== Background ===
Asher Edelman and his New York gallery, Edelman Arts, were chosen to curate the art of the new One World Trade Center building. The team decided all public art of the building should be abstract and focus on themes of unity. None of the art commissioned for One World Trade Center made any mention of the 2001 attacks, and instead focused on moving forward. Five artists, all Americans, were selected to create works for the new Skyscraper. Two paintings by the late American artist Fritz Bultman were also chosen to hang on the walls of the lobby.

=== ONE: Union of the Senses (2014) by José Parlá ===
The lobby is dominated by José Parlá's 90-by-15-foot (27.4 by 4.6 m) mural ONE: Union of the Senses, which is thought to be the largest painting in New York City. Parla, who had previously painted large scale murals in Barclays Center and Brooklyn Academy of Music utilized his trademark technique of blending elements of street art and calligraphy. The mural is noted for its use of bright colors, which according to Parlá represent the diversity of people in New York City.

=== Lenape (2015) and Unami (2015) by Donald Martiny ===
The lobby also contains two paintings, Lenape and Unami by Donald Martiny. The two works were the largest Martiny had ever created, and had to be completed on-site as they were too large to have fit through the building's door. Martiny spent two months working on the paintings in the lobby of One World Trade Center. About the process, Martiny said "Up to this point no one had ever seen me paint, I always paint alone. The Trade Center gets 25,000 visitors every day. That took a bit of getting used to."

Both works give the appearance of being giant paint brushstrokes, but were created by Martiny completely by hand without the use of a paintbrush, knife, or any other painting tool.

Lenape was named after Lenape people, an indigenous tribe that once occupied the land that is now modern-day New York City. Unami was named after the Unami language, an extinct language spoken by the Lenape people.

=== One World Trade Center Series (2014) by Greg Goldberg ===
Seven oil on canvas paintings by artist Greg Goldberg are displayed in the 64th floor sky lobby. Each painting is 5 1/2 by 6 feet (1.7 by 1.8 m), and was completed by Goldberg in his Connecticut studio. The paintings feature a wavy abstract colors.

=== Prana by Bryan Hunt ===
Bryan Hunt created the only public sculpture commissioned for the skyscraper. Prana, which means "life force" in Sanskrit, measures 13 by 5 feet (4.0 by 1.5 m), and is on display in the east side of the 64th floor sky lobby. The sculpture is inspired by airships, Hunt saying "I just wanted something kind of weightless and gravity free."

=== Gravity of Nightfall and Blue Triptych-Intrusion Into the Blue (1961) by Fritz Bultman ===
Abstract artist Fritz Bultman was the only deceased artist whose art was chosen for the World Trade Center Complex; all other works were commissioned and created specifically for the World Trade Center. Bultman, who died in 1983, was a member of a group of artists nicknamed "The Irascibles", along with Willem de Kooning, Mark Rothko, and Jackson Pollock. The paintings are on display in the North Lobby of the building.

=== Randomly Placed Exact Percentages and Isotropic by Doug Argue ===
The paintings by Minnesota artist Doug Argue are hung in the front of the lobby. Both works incorporate Argue's style of blending elements of math and science into his paintings.

== 3 World Trade Center ==
Untitled (Fish on Fire, Greenwich Street) 2024, a copper sculpture by Frank Gehry, has been mounted in the lobby of 3 World Trade Center since 2025. The sculpture, measuring 20 by 7 feet (6.1 by 2.1 m) across, can rotate and is illuminated from inside.

One wall of 3 WTC's lobby contains Joystick, a 46-foot-wide (14 m) mural by James Rosenquist, which was originally painted in 2002 and reinstalled at 3 WTC in 2020.

== 4 World Trade Center ==
The new 4 World Trade Center was developed by Silverstein Properties, who appointed Robert Marcucci art consultant. Marcucci, along with the company's chief marketing officer Dara McQuillan, put forward the idea to create an art studio and gallery on the 69th floor of the building.

=== Memorial by David Uda ===
Irish artist David Uda was commissioned to paint a memorial to the victims, which is located on the floor of the 69th story of the World Trade Center 4. The painting took several weeks to complete, and features a large circle containing 2,606 painted flowers, one for each person that died at the World Trade Center on September 11. It also contains 13 stripes, a reference to the American flag.

=== Large-scale Installation by Kozo Nishino ===
Japanese sculptor and kinetic artist from Kyoto, Japan, Kozo Nishino was commissioned to create a 30-meter-diameter titanium arc in the lobby of 4 World Trade Center. The installation is titled Sky Memory and was his first commission in the United States. The sculpture weights 215 kilograms and is suspended about 7 meters above the ground so that it appears as if it is floating.

== 7 World Trade Center ==
Jeff Koons's Balloon Flower (Red), on loan to Larry Silverstein, was located outside 7 World Trade Center from 2006 until 2018 when it was removed for refurbishment. In 2021, Frank Stella's Jasper's Split Star was installed in the same spot.

== See also ==
- Artwork damaged or destroyed in the September 11 attacks
