= Artwork damaged or destroyed in the September 11 attacks =

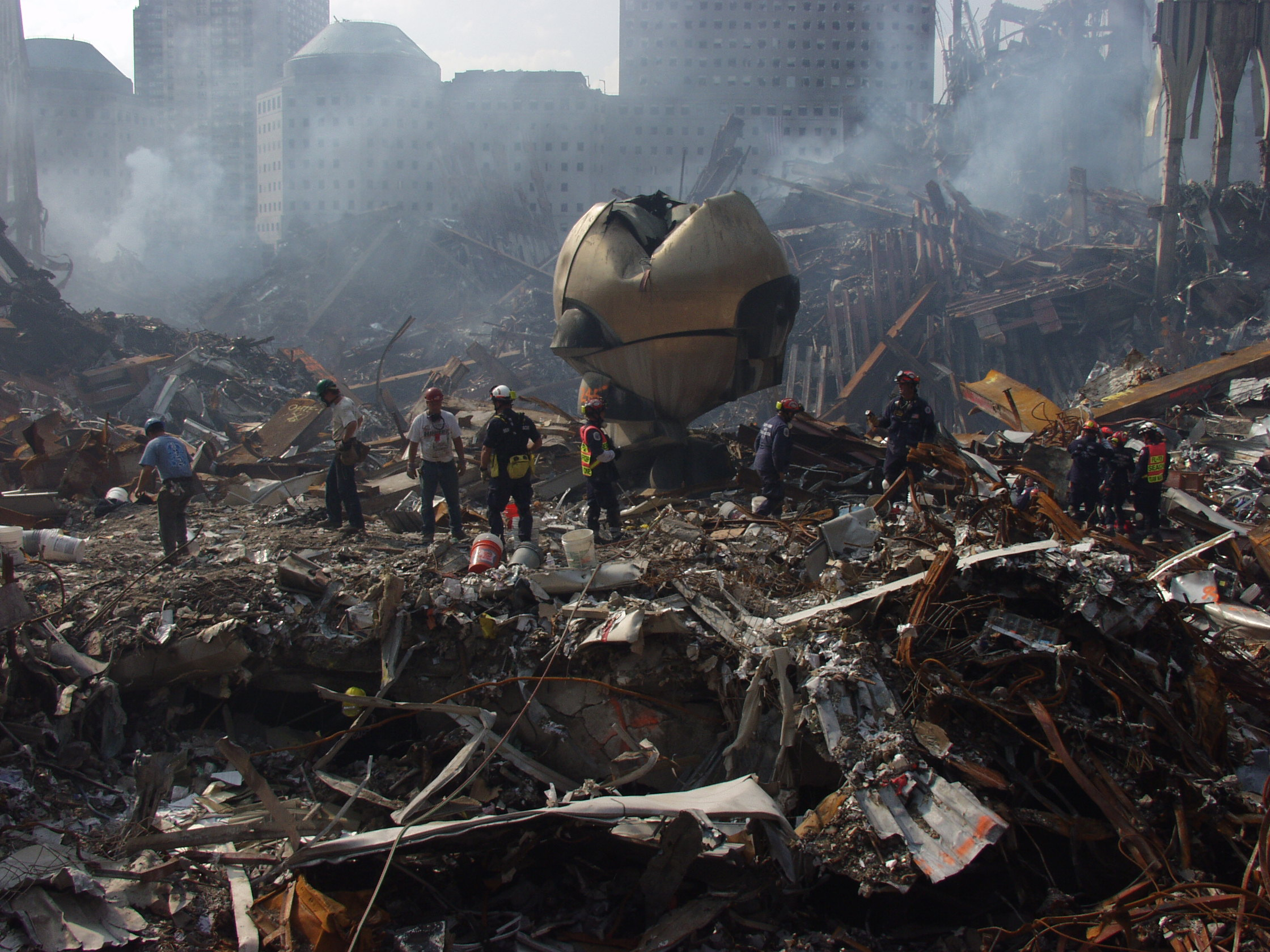
The Sphere by Fritz Koenig (1971) at Ground Zero, now exhibited at Liberty Park

In 2001, an estimated $110 million of art in Manhattan and the Pentagon was lost in the September 11 attacks: $100 million in private art and $10 million in public art. Much of the art was not insured for its full value. In October 2001, a spokesperson for insurance specialists AXA Art described the attacks as "the biggest single disaster ever to affect the [art] industry".

The Port Authority of New York and New Jersey held an estimated 100 pieces of art work at the World Trade Center complex, in addition to the seven public works of art that had been created for the World Trade Center, all of which were destroyed or severely damaged. The offices of brokerage house Cantor Fitzgerald reportedly contained 300 Rodin sculptures.

== Public art ==
An estimated $10 million worth of public art was lost due to the collapse of the World Trade Center.

There were eight one-of-a-kind public works of art in the World Trade Center Complex at the time of the attacks:

- Bent Propeller by Alexander Calder, 1970
- The Sphere by Fritz Koenig, 1971
- World Trade Center Plaza Sculpture (known as Cloud Fortress) by Masayuki Nagare, 1972
- Ideogram by James Rosati, 1972
- The World Trade Center Tapestry by Joan Miró and Josep Royo, 1974
- Sky Gate, New York by Louise Nevelson, 1978
- 1993 World Trade Center Bombing Memorial fountain by Elyn Zimmerman, 1995
- World Trade Center Peace On Earth sculpture, 1998, temporary installed during the holiday seasons

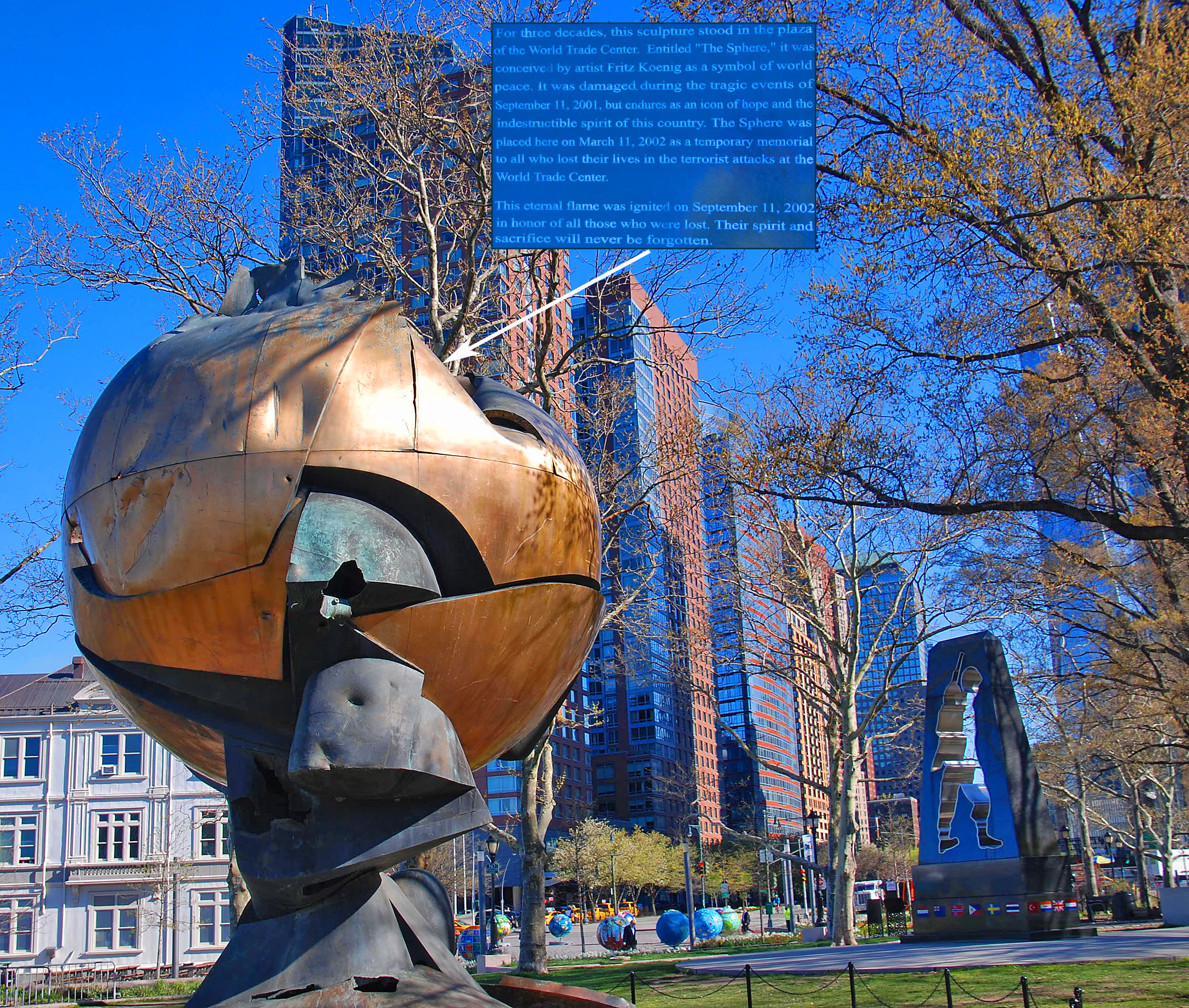
The Sphere in 2016 at Battery Park. It was relocated to Liberty Park the following year.

=== Recovery ===
- Ideogram, The World Trade Center Tapestry, and Sky Gate, New York, were never recovered from the rubble and are presumed destroyed.
- Cloud Fortress survived the attack and collapse of the buildings, but was cleared by rescue workers in the days after the attacks in order to access and clear the site. The remains were not preserved and were lost with the rest of the removed rubble.
- Bent Propeller was partially recovered from the rubble, but not enough of the original sculpture remained for restoration.
- 1993 Bombing Memorial Fountain. Only a small piece of the fountain was recovered.
- The Sphere was damaged in the attacks, but was refurbished and put on display as a memorial.

In addition to the seven public art works, the Port Authority also had approximately 100 pieces of art in the complex, including:

- Recollection Pond, a tapestry by Romare Bearden
- Path Mural by Germaine Keller
- Commuter Landscape, a mural by Cynthia Mailman (was destroyed in the 1993 terrorist attack on the WTC, not in 2001 as related in the link).
- Fan Dancing with the Birds, a mural by Hunt Slonem

== Private art collections ==
The World Trade Center alone held more than 430 tenants at the time of the attacks. In addition to the decorative art that each office contained, some firms held large corporate art collections.

Three companies held major corporate art collections in the World Trade Center: Fred Alger, Cantor Fitzgerald, and Bank of America. Aside from these three, all other companies in the World Trade Center kept their artwork in other locations.

=== Cantor Fitzgerald ===
In addition to losing the most lives in the attack, Cantor Fitzgerald lost the most artwork. Their offices on the 105th floor of the North Tower housed a gallery which held an estimated 300 casts of Rodin sculptures.

Some of the Rodin works were recovered a quarter mile away from Ground Zero, including a bust from The Burghers of Calais, two of the three figures from The Three Shades, and a cast of The Thinker. After being recovered, The Thinker cast went missing, possibly due to theft.

=== Citigroup ===
The collection of Citigroup, whose office was in 7 World Trade Center, contained 1,113 works of art which were all lost on September 11, 2001, according to Suzanne F. W. Lemakis, who was the Citigroup art curator at the time of the attacks.

The Citigroup collection at the World Trade Center consisted of about 75% prints, many of which were mass-produced and were replaceable. Also lost were English and American antique furniture, and Asian porcelains.

According to Lemakis, the most expensive painting in Citigroup's collection was a large mural depicting Wall Street, painted by an unknown designer.

=== Fred Alger ===
Also located in the North Tower, this firm lost a collection of photographs by photographers including Cindy Sherman and Hiroshi Sugimoto.

=== Bank of America ===
Bank of America's office in the World Trade Center lost over 100 works of art by contemporary artists.

=== J.P. Morgan Chase ===
At the time of the attack, the firm had only five lithographs in its Trade Center office, keeping most of its corporate art collection of over 17,000 works of art at its offices two blocks from the World Trade Center.

=== Windows on the World ===
The Greatest Bar on Earth, located within Windows on the World in One World Trade Center, contained four blown glass, nickel plated bronze, steel, and fiberoptic light sculptures collectively named Skyscrapers by Dan Dailey. These sculptures were destroyed in the attacks.

== Art studios in the World Trade Center ==
The Lower Manhattan Cultural Council had its offices in Building 5 of the World Trade Center, and two studios on the 91st and 92nd floors of the North Tower. The Council hosted an artist-in-residency program, called World Views, which hosted 15 artists from around the globe and was supposed to run from May–November 2001. The 15 artists worked in the studios in the North Tower. Nearly all of their artwork was lost in the attack on and subsequent collapse of the towers. At least one of the artists, Jamaican-born sculptor Michael Richards, also died in the attacks. Richards had worked through the night in the towers on an unfinished sculpture, a memorial piece dedicated to the Tuskegee Airmen, which portrayed a pilot riding a burning meteor.

The council also lost all of its archives that had been in their offices in Building 5.

== Government art collections ==
At the Pentagon, a total of 24 artworks were destroyed, with an additional 40 pieces receiving substantial damage. None of the works were insured, so there is no monetary estimate to what was lost, but Army art curator Renee Klish has noted that "the importance of the military collections is historic, not monetary." Marine art curator Jack Dyer described the art pieces lost at the Pentagon and in New York as "cultural casualties."

The Army lost eight paintings at the Pentagon in the Army Center of Military History including:

- O.D. One Each by Gary Porter, 1967
- The Battle of Attleboro by Gary Porter, large oil painting
- The Nucklebusters

Out of approximately 200 works the Navy held at the Pentagon, two are unaccounted for after the attack; one sustained extensive smoke damage; and roughly 40 more had minor smoke damage. The Air Force lost ten paintings, all of various aircraft. Seven artworks owned by the Marine Corps were also destroyed. They lost six lithographs, paintings, and one print. An additional seven other works were damaged.

On September 11, American Airlines Flight 77 came to a stop with its nose cone resting on the back wall of the Pentagon library which held over 500,000 books and documents dating back to the early 1800s. All library staff escaped, but the Chief Army Librarian Ann Parham suffered facial burns. The collection was not fully catalogued, due to the rapid addition of new documents and regulations, and it was also not insured. The books and documents were damaged by mold, soot containing hydrochloric acid, asbestos debris, water damage, and smoke damage. The library's restoration cost $500,000 and saved approximately 99% of the book collection and all of its historic materials.

== See also ==
- Artwork at the World Trade Center (2001–present)
- List of buildings damaged or destroyed in the September 11 attacks

== Bibliography ==
- Heritage Preservation. Cataclysm and Challenge: Impact of September 11, 2001, on Our Nation’s Cultural Heritage. 2002. Retrieved July 18, 2020.
