= The Nurse =

The Nurse or The Nurses may refer to:

== Film and television ==
- The Nurse (1912 film), an American short film
- The Nurses (TV series), a 1962–1965 American primetime medical drama which aired on CBS
  - The Nurses (1965 TV series), a 1965–1967 American daytime soap opera, a continuation of the 1962 TV series, that aired on ABC
- Nurses (American TV series), an American sitcom that aired on NBC, 1991–1994
- The Nurse, a 1997 American drama horror thriller film starring Lisa Zane
- The Nurse (2017 film), a 2-minute short film, related to The Conjuring film series
- The Nurse (Sygeplejersken), a 2023 Danish true crime miniseries starring Josephine Park

== Other uses ==
- Nurse (Romeo and Juliet), a character in William Shakespeare's Romeo and Juliet
- "The Nurse", a song by The White Stripes from their 2005 album Get Behind Me Satan

== See also ==
- Nurse (American TV series), an American medical drama that aired on CBS, 1981–1982
- Nurse (disambiguation)
- Nursing (disambiguation)
- Nursery (disambiguation)
