= Nurse (disambiguation) =

A nurse is a healthcare professional.

Nurse or nurses may also refer to:

== Occupations and activities ==
- Registered nurse, a licensing nurse
- Breastfeeding, also known as "nursing"
  - Wet nurse, a woman who breastfeeds the baby of another
- Nanny, in the 19th and 20th century known as a "nurse"
  - Nursemaid, a nanny's aide
- Nursery nurse, a specialist in early childhood education

== Arts and entertainment ==
- Nurse (Romeo and Juliet), a character in William Shakespeare's Romeo and Juliet
- Nurse (album), an album by Therapy?
- Nurse (band), an American rock band
- Nurse (1979 book), by Peggy Anderson
- Nurse, a monster from the video game series Silent Hill

=== Film and television ===
- Nurse (film), a 1969 Indian film
- Nurse 3D, a 2013 horror film, also released in a 2D version as Nurse
- Nurse (American TV series), a 1981–1982 medical drama
- Nurse (British TV series), a 2015 sitcom by Paul Whitehouse
- Nurses (American TV series), a 1991–1994 sitcom
- Nurses (Australian TV series), a 2021 factual series
- Nurses (Canadian TV series), a 2020–2021 drama
- Nurses (Colombian TV series), a 2019–2022 medical drama
- Nurses (Finnish TV series), or Syke, a medical drama that premiered in 2014
- Nurses, a 2007 unaired American hospital comedy-drama series starring Eliza Dushku

== Other uses ==
- Nurse (surname)

== See also ==
- Nurse tree, a tree that protects another plant when it is in its tender stages
- My American Nurse, film by Pascal Atuma
- Nursing (disambiguation)
- The Nurse (disambiguation)
