= Nurse (surname) =

Origin
- Origin: Old French

Nurse is an Old French surname, originally denoting the occupation of a name bearer, but eventually becoming hereditary. Early uses were recorded in England in the 14th century and later. Today, the surname is most common in the United States, the United Kingdom, Canada, and the Caribbean. Smaller populations exist in Australia, New Zealand, and South Africa.

Notable people with the surname include:

- Ashley Nurse (born 1988), Barbadian cricketer
- Bertha Grace Nurse (1879–1962), New Zealand nurse
- Charles George Nurse (1862–1933), English officer, naturalist, entomologist
- Charles Nurse (1909–1981), Anglican archdeacon
- Chris Nurse (born 1984), Guyanese footballer
- Cristy Nurse (born 1986), Canadian rower
- Dan Nurse (1874–1959), English footballer
- Darnell Nurse (born 1995), Canadian ice hockey player
- David Nurse (born 1976), English footballer
- Denise Nurse (born 1976), British entrepreneur, lawyer and television presenter
- George Nurse (footballer) (born 1999), English footballer
- George Nurse (VC) (1873–1945), Irish recipient of the Victoria Cross
- Jon Nurse (born 1981), Barbadian football coach and former player
- Jonathan Nurse (cricketer) (born 1885), Guyanese cricketer
- Josh Nurse (born 1996), American football player
- Kia Nurse (born 1996), Canadian basketball player
- Lee Nurse (1976–2020), English cricketer
- Lindell Nurse, Barbadian politician
- Martin Nurse (born 1985), West Indian cricketer
- Mary Gaynor Nurse (1927–2004), English nurse
- Mel Nurse (born 1937), Welsh footballer
- Negus Nurse (born 1982), Guyanese singer
- Nick Nurse (born 1967), American basketball coach
- Paul Nurse (born 1949), English geneticist and Nobel laureate
- Phil Nurse (born 1963), English Muay Thai coach
- Rebecca Nurse (1621–1692), Convicted witch in Salem, Massachusetts
- Richard Nurse (born 1966), Canadian wide receiver
- Roberto Nurse (born 1983), Panamanian footballer
- Rohan Nurse (born 1983), Barbadian cricketer
- Roy Nurse (1919–1991), New Zealand international rugby league footballer
- Rupert Nurse (1910–2001), Trinidadian musician
- Ryan Nurse (born 1983), Barbadian cricketer
- Sandy Nurse (born 1984), American politician
- Sarah Nurse (born 1995), Canadian ice hockey player
- Seymour Nurse (1933–2019), Barbadian cricketer
- Tim Nurse (born 1999), English field hockey player
- Trevor Nurse (1965–2016), British darts player
- Ty Nurse (born 1990), Canadian professional basketball player
- Tyrone Nurse (born 1990), British professional boxer
- William Nurse (1832–1885), Member of the New Zealand Legislative Council
- Zephany Nurse (born 1997), South African abductee

== See also ==
- Nurse (disambiguation)
