= Nursery =

Nursery may refer to:

== Childcare ==
- Nursery (room), a room within the house designed for the care of a young child or children.
- Nursery school, another name for preschool, a daycare facility for preschool-age children

== Places ==
- Nursery, British Columbia, an unincorporated community in the Similkameen Division Yale Land District, Canada
- Nursery, Karachi, a residential area of Sindh, Pakistan
- Nursery, Texas, an unincorporated community in Victoria County, United States
- Nursery Inn, a public house in Stockport, Greater Manchester, England
- Nursery Site, RI-273, a prehistoric archaeological site in Westerly, Rhode Island, United States

== Music ==
- Nursery Suite (1931), a composition by Edward Elgar
- The Nursery (1870), a song cycle by Modest Mussorgsky

== Art ==
- The Nursery (1660s), a painting by Gerard Dou, lost with the sinking of the Vrouw Maria in 1771
- The Nursery (Christmas Stockings) (1936), a painting by Stanley Spencer

== Plants and gardens ==
- Plant nursery, a place where plants are propagated and grown to a desired size
- Garden centre, a retail business that primarily sells plants and related products for domestic gardening

== Science ==
- Stellar nursery, cosmic dust cloud in which stars form
- Nursery habitat, where juveniles of a marine species occur

== Other uses ==
- Farm team, where sportspeople can gain experience before playing for a major team
- Nursery handicap, in British and Irish horse racing, a flat handicap race limited to two-year-olds

== See also ==
- Nurse (disambiguation)
- Nursery rhyme, a traditional poem or song for children in Britain and other European countries
- Nursery web spider, of the family Pisauridae
