= List of shipwrecks in October 1875 =

The list of shipwrecks in October 1875 includes ships sunk, foundered, grounded, or otherwise lost during October 1875.

== 1 October ==
List of shipwrecks: 1 October 1875
Ship	State	Description
Anne	United Kingdom	The ship was driven ashore at Waterford. She was refloated with assistance from the tug Tintern (United Kingdom).
Æolus	Norway	The schooner was abandoned in the North Sea. Her crew were rescued. she was on a voyage from Alloa, Clackmannanshire, United Kingdom to Tønsberg, Germany. Æolus was subsequently taken in to Løkken-Vrå, Denmark and beached. She broke up on 5 October.
Anna	Denmark	The ship put in to Gothenburg, Sweden in a waterlogged condition. She was on a voyage from Fredrikshavn to an English port.
Arab	United Kingdom	The ship ran aground and sank at Wisbech, Cambridgeshire. She was on a voyage from Söderhamn, Sweden, to Wisbech.
Aurora	Flag unknown	The ship was wrecked at Arkhangelsk, Russia.
Egeria	Germany	The brig was taken in to Grebbestad, Sweden in a derelict and waterlogged condition.
Elizabeth Ray	United Kingdom	The ship ran aground on The Shingles, off the Isle of Wight. She was on a voyage from Alderney, Channel Islands, to Shoreham-by-Sea, Sussex. She was refloated and taken in to Portsmouth, Hampshire in a leaky condition.
Fimraar	Flag unknown	The ship was wrecked at Arkhangelsk.
Firdar	Flag unknown	The ship was wrecked at Arkhangelsk.
Franciskas	Germany	The ship was driven ashore at East Newton, Yorkshire.
Jens Nordentoft Minde	Denmark	The schooner was wrecked at Thisted. Her crew were rescued. She was on a voyage from Newcastle upon Tyne, Northumberland, United Kingdom, to Thisted.
Liffey	United Kingdom	The steamship was driven ashore at Youghal, County Cork. She was on a voyage from Neath, Glamorgan, to Cork.
Lotus	United Kingdom	The schooner was abandoned in the North Sea in a sinking condition. She was on a voyage from Saint Petersburg, Russia, to London.
Louise	United Kingdom	The schooner was driven ashore and wrecked on Düne, Heligoland. Her crew were rescued. She was on a voyage from Stettin, Germany, to Cardiff, Glamorgan.
Lydia	United Kingdom	The ship was wrecked at Gothenburg. Her crew were rescued.
Marie Berthe	Sweden	The ship was driven ashore at Gothenburg. She was on a voyage from Skellefteå to Dénia, Spain.
Marienhamn	(Russian Empire) Grand Duchy of Finland	The ship was wrecked at Arkhangelsk.
Normandie	France	The barque ran aground and sank on the Hebble Shoal, in the Humber. She was on a voyage from Goole, Yorkshire, to Grimsby, Lincolnshire, United Kingdom. She was later refloated and taken in to Hull, Yorkshire.
Prinz Gustav	Flag unknown	The ship was wrecked at Arkhangelsk.
Queen	United Kingdom	The ship was wrecked at "Waederoarue" with the loss of a crew member. She was on a voyage from Stettin, Germany, to Liverpool, Lancashire.
Rannen	Flag unknown	The ship was wrecked at Arkhangelsk.
Waverley	Germany	The barque was abandoned 30 nautical miles (56 km) east of the Dogger Bank. Her crew were rescued by the smack Topaze (United Kingdom). Waverley subsequently came ashore at Ringkøbing, Denmark.

== 2 October ==
List of shipwrecks: 2 October 1875
Ship	State	Description
Cormorant	Sweden	The brig was driven ashore. She was on a voyage from Maruim, Brazil, to Stockholm. She was refloated and towed in to Tvedestrand, Denmark in a severely leaky condition.
Edward Barro	United Kingdom	The ship ran aground at Middlesbrough, Yorkshire.
Howard D. Throop	United Kingdom	The ship ran aground at Cardiff, Glamorgan. She was on a voyage from Cardiff to Rio de Janeiro, Brazil.
Maria	Germany	The ship sprang a leak and foundered. Her crew were rescued. She was on a voyage from Sundsvall, Sweden, to Danzig.
Normandie	France	The barque ran aground and heeled over in the Humber.
Pallas	United Kingdom	The barque was wrecked at "Walderocarne". She was on a voyage from Bristol, Gloucestershire, to Nicolaieff, Russia.
Valley Forge	United States	The ship was driven ashore on Tybee Island, Georgia and was severely damaged. She was on a voyage from Enderberry Island to Savannah, Georgia. She was refloated.

== 3 October ==
List of shipwrecks: 3 October 1875
Ship	State	Description
Betsey C. Milne	United Kingdom	The ship ran aground and sank at Cantic Head, Orkney Islands. Her crew were rescued. She was on a voyage from Newcastle upon Tyne, Northumberland, to Dublin.
Cornelia Catherina	Netherlands	The ship sank in the Kattegat. Her crew were rescued. She was on a voyage from Newcastle upon Tyne to Saint Petersburg, Russia.
Engeline	Germany	The ship was abandoned. Her four crew were rescued by the steamship Vale of Calder (United Kingdom).

== 4 October ==
List of shipwrecks: 4 October 1875
Ship	State	Description
Anna	Netherlands	The ship foundered. Her crew were rescued. She was on a voyage from Ystad, Sweden, to Great Yarmouth, Norfolk, United Kingdom.
Arethusa	United Kingdom	The ship capsized at Blackwall, Middlesex.
Busk	United Kingdom	The ship was driven ashore and severely damaged at "Glean Morte". She was refloated.
Crusader	United Kingdom	The ship capsized at Blackwall, Middlesex. She was righted.
Deodora	Norway	The ship foundered in the Skagerrak. Her crew were rescued.
Essai	France	The ship was wrecked with the loss of two of her crew.
Gloriosa	Germany	The ship ran aground at Loviisa, Grand Duchy of Finland. She was on a voyage from Swinemünde to Loviisa.
Helvetia	Belgium	The ship was driven ashore at the Rammekens Castle, Vlissingen, Zeeland, Netherlands. She was on a voyage from Antwerp to New York, United States. She was refloated.
H. P. Kitchen	United Kingdom	The ship was driven ashore and wrecked at Saint-Pierre, Saint Pierre and Miquelon. She was on a voyage from London to Sydney, Nova Scotia, Canada.
IJssel	Netherlands	The ship sank in the Zuyder Zee. She was on a voyage from Goole, Yorkshire, to Kampen, Overijssel.
Johan Carl	Germany	The ship was driven ashore on Læsø, Denmark She was on a voyage from Rostock to London. She was refloated and taken in to Frederikshavn, Denmark.
L. J. Bager	Sweden	The steamship caught fire and sank in Køge Bay with the loss of 33 lives. She was on a voyage from Lübeck, Germany, to Copenhagen, Denmark.
Lomes	Netherlands	The ship was wrecked on Nidingen, Sweden. Her crew were rescued. She was on a voyage from Amsterdam, North Holland, to Riga, Russia.
Louisa	United Kingdom	The schooner was driven ashore and severely damaged at St. Margaret's Bay, Kent. She was on a voyage from Middlesbrough, Yorkshire, to Newport, Monmouthshire.
Medina	Straits Settlements	The steamship was wrecked on the Parkin Rock, in the Hanish Islands. Her passengers were taken off by Timor (United Kingdom). Fifty of her crew were taken off by the steamship Voorwarts (Netherlands). Medina was on a voyage from Singapore to Jeddah, Hejaz Vilayet.
Moselle	Germany	The barque was towed in to Arendal, Norway in a waterlogged condition. She was on a voyage from Kronstadt, Russia, to Marseille, Bouches-du-Rhône, France.
Pallas	(Russian Empire) Grand Duchy of Finland	The barque was wrecked at "Waldervearne". She was on a voyage from Bristol, Gloucestershire, United Kingdom, to "Necolaisted".
Reaper	United Kingdom	The schooner capsized and sank in the River Thames at Thameshaven, Essex. Her crew were rescued.
Rosa	United Kingdom	The steamship ran aground near "Peaperno", Grand Duchy of Finland.
Rose	United Kingdom	The ship was wrecked on the Vogelsand, in the North Sea off the German coast. Her crew survived. She was on a voyage from Lybster, Caithness, to Altona, Germany.
Ruth	United Kingdom	The barque ran aground on the Oton Bank, off Yloilo, Spanish East Indies. She was on a voyage from Saigon, French Indo-China to Yloilo.
Sans Pareil	United Kingdom	The ship was wrecked on Buck Island, Newfoundland Colony. She was on a voyage from London to Quebec City, Canada.
Six Frères	United Kingdom	The ship was wrecked at Anegada, Bahamas. She was on a voyage from the Newfoundland Colony to Puerto Rico.
Trio	Norway	The barque was abandoned in the North Sea. Her crew were rescued. She was on a voyage from Sundsvall, Sweden, to Leith, Lothian, United Kingdom. She was towed in to Kristiansand, Norway in a derelict condition.

== 5 October ==
List of shipwrecks: 5 October 1875
Ship	State	Description
Atlas	United Kingdom	The steamship ran aground at Gothenburg, Sweden and was wrecked. She was on a voyage from Hull, Yorkshire, to Kronstadt, Russia.
Boyd	New Zealand	The 16-ton schooner ran aground south of the mouth of the Mōtū River, Bay of Plenty, New Zealand, during a gale and became a wreck.
Caroline Louise	United Kingdom	The ship ran aground near Memel, Germany.
Corienne Augustine	France	The ship ran aground at Mont-Saint-Michel, Manche.
Frederico Myllus	Italy	The brig was driven ashore at Lagos, Lagos Colony.
Hector	United Kingdom	The steamship ran aground on a reef 6 nautical miles (11 km) off Amoy, China and broke in two. Her crew were rescued. She was on a voyage from Shanghai, China, to London.
Jane	United Kingdom	The fishing smack was run down and sunk in the North Sea off the Bull Lightship ( Trinity House) by the steamship Galatz (United Kingdom). Her nine crew got aboard the Bull Lightship, from where they were rescued the next day. The captain of Galatz was prosecuted by the Board of Trade for failing to render assistance to the crew of Jane, contrary to the Merchant Shipping Act. He was fined £20 and costs, or 1 month's imprisonment in default.
Jugoslav	Austria-Hungary	The barque was destroyed by fire. Her crew were rescued. She as on a voyage from Port Said to Gaza, Egypt.
May Flower	United Kingdom	The sschooner was driven ashore on Hogland, Russia. She was on a voyage from Kronstadt, Russia, to Helsingør, Denmark.
Sarah	Germany	The brig was wrecked at "San Martine", Nicaragua.
Sol	United Kingdom	The schooner foundered in the North Sea 30 nautical miles (56 km) off Vlissingen, Zeeland, Netherlands. Her crew were rescued. She was on a voyage from South Shields to Rotterdam, South Holland, Netherlands.
Stephen	United Kingdom	The ship collided with Boz (Germany) and sank off Bornholm, Denmark. Her crew were rescued. She was on a voyage from Fraserburgh, Aberdeenshire, to Danzig, Germany.

== 6 October ==
List of shipwrecks: 6 October 1875
Ship	State	Description
Antelope	United Kingdom	The full-rigged ship was damaged by fire at San Francisco, California.
Daring	Norway	The ship was driven ashore at Rydebäck, Sweden. She was on a voyage from Middlesbrough, Yorkshire, United Kingdom, to Landskrona, Sweden.
Island Maid	United Kingdom	The brig was driven ashore near Mahón, Mallorca, Spain. She was on a voyage from Corfu, Greece, to Saint Petersburg, Russia.
Mary	United Kingdom	The ship was wrecked on Langlade Island. She was on a voyage from Richibucto, New Brunswick, Canada to Liverpool, Lancashire.
Moormann	Flag unknown	The steamship ran aground 6 nautical miles (11 km) off Kem, Russia.
Normand	Norway	The ship was wrecked off Jurmo, Grand Duchy of Finland. She was on a voyage from Hudiksvall, Sweden, to Le Havre, Seine-Inférieure, France.
Robert	United Kingdom	The schooner ran on an anchor and sank in the River Usk. Her crew were rescued. She was on a voyage from Newport, Monmouthshire, to Queenstown, County Cork. She was refloated and towed back to Newport in a waterlogged condition.
Sophia	Netherlands	The ship ran aground on Seskar, Grand Duchy of Finland. She was on a voyage from Kronstadt, Russia, to Kristiansand, Norway. She was refloated and put back to Kronstadt in a leaky condition.
Standard	United Kingdom	The ship was driven ashore on Anticosti Island, Nova Scotia, Canada. She was on a voyage from Middlesbrough to Quebec City, Canada. She was refloated and completed her voyage.
Thomas Sorby	United Kingdom	The steamship ran aground and was wrecked on the Ooster Bank, in the North Sea off the Dutch coast. All on board were rescued. She was on a voyage from Java, Netherlands East Indies, to Rotterdam, South Holland, Netherlands.
Traveller	United Kingdom	The tug was destroyed by fire at Newport, Monmouthshire.

== 7 October ==
List of shipwrecks: 7 October 1875
Ship	State	Description
Courier	United Kingdom	The steamship struck the Manuel Rock. She was refloated and towed in to Lindisfarne, Northumberland, where she sank. Her crew were rescued. She was on a voyage from Seaham, County Durham, to Aberdeen.
Danube	Sweden	The ship was wrecked. She was on a voyage from London, United Kingdom, to Copenhagen, Denmark.
Ellida	Germany	The ship foundered in the North Sea and was abandoned by her crew. She was on a voyage from Newcastle upon Tyne, Northumberland, United Kingdom to Lübeck.
Grimsby	United Kingdom	The steamship foundered in the North Sea with the loss of all hands, according to a message in a bottle that washed up at Cheswick, Northumberland in early December. She was on a voyage from Grimsby, Lincolnshire, to Hamburg, Germany.
Harold	United Kingdom	The ship ran aground in the Gironde. She was on a voyage from Bordeaux, Gironde, France to Buenos Aires, Argentina.
Hoffnung	Germany	The ship foundered in the North Sea off Heligoland, Her crew survived.
Lady Wodehouse	United Kingdom	The ship ran aground on the North Bull, in the Irish Sea off the coast of County Dublin. Her passengers were taken off. She was refloated and taken in to Dublin.
Thorer Helsing	Sweden	The steamship was driven ashore and wrecked at Trelleborg.

== 8 October ==
List of shipwrecks: 8 October 1875
Ship	State	Description
Abana	United Kingdom	The steamship ran aground at Dunkirk, Nord, France. She was on a voyage from Newcastle upon Tyne, Northumberland, to Dunkirk. She was refloated on 12 October.
Frisch	Netherlands	The barque was wrecked on Saaremaa, Russia. Her crew were rescued. She was on voyage from Riga, Russia, to Harlingen, Friesland.
Maren Gorup	Denmark	The ship was wrecked on Amrum, Friesland, Netherlands. She was on a voyage from Thisted to Hartlepool, County Durham.
Red Jacket	United Kingdom	The ship was driven ashore on Anticosti Island, Nova Scotia, Canada. She was on a voyage from London to Quebec City, Canada. She was refloated and completed her voyage.
Seth	United Kingdom	The schooner ran aground on the Maplin Sand, in the North Sea off the coast of Essex. She was refloated.
Unnamed	Flag unknown	A ship sank in the North Sea. Ten crew were rescued. She was on a voyage from Kronstadt, Russia, to Bremen, Germany.

== 9 October ==
List of shipwrecks: 9 October 1875
Ship	State	Description
Arinos	Brazil	The steamship was lost at Castello. Her crew were rescued. She was on a voyage from the Rio Grande to Montevideo, Uruguay.
Biscay	United Kingdom	The steamship ran aground on the Hom Reef, off the coast of Jutland. She was on a voyage from Kronstadt, Russia, to Bremerhaven, Germany. She was refloated but consequently foundered with the loss of eleven of her 21 crew.
Blanche	United Kingdom	The ship ran aground on Whitford Sker, in the Bristol Channel. She was refloated the next day and taken in to Llanelly, Glamorgan.
Collector	United Kingdom	The smack was abandoned off the Dogger Bank. Her crew were rescued by the barque Galatea (Norway).
Ernest Fanny	United Kingdom	The brig was driven ashore at Casablanca, Morocco. She was on a voyage from Marseille, Bouches-du-Rhône, France to Casablanca. She was consequently condemned.
General Palleja	Brazil	The steamship was wrecked.
Maria Stuart	United Kingdom	The steamship ran aground at Dunkirk, Nord, France. She was on a voyage from Leith, Lothian, to Dunkirk.
Mavie	Germany	The ship ran aground near Thisted, Denmark. She was on a voyage from New York, United States, to Stettin. She was later refloated and resumed her voyage.
Oceola	United Kingdom	The ship struck rocks at Ardrossan, Ayrshire and was damaged. She was on a voyage from Dublin to Ardrossan. She was refloated and taken in to Ardrossan in a leaky condition.
Peter Joynson	United Kingdom	The ship was sighted off Saint Helena whilst on a voyage from Rangoon, Burma, to the English Channel. No further trace, presumed foundered with the loss of all 30 crew.
Wilhelm	Germany	The brig was towed in to Liepāja, Russia in a waterlogged condition. She was on a voyage from Riga, Russia, to Grangemouth, Stirlingshire, United Kingdom.
Unnamed	Russia	A lighter sank in the Sea of Azov with the loss of five of her ten crew. Survivors were rescued by the steamship Excellent (United Kingdom).

== 10 October ==
List of shipwrecks: 10 October 1875
Ship	State	Description
Aimable Prudence	France	The schooner was wrecked off Cardiff, Glamorgan, United Kingdom with the loss of four of her six crew. Survivors were rescued by the barque Sandberg (Netherlands). Aimable Prudence was on a voyage from Cardiff to Nantes, Loire-Inférieure.
Catharina	Netherlands	The schooner foundered in the Baltic Sea between Gotland, Sweden and Hiiumaa, Russia. Her crew were rescued by the barque Nidelven (Norway).
Emanuel	United Kingdom	The ship was abandoned off Falsterbo, Sweden. Her crew were rescued.
Lady Alice	United Kingdom	The ship was run down and sunk in the English Channel by the steamship Nuremberg (Germany). Her crew were rescued. Lady Alice was on a voyage from Hull, Yorkshire, to Salcombe, Devon.
Notre Dame	United Kingdom	The smack foundered in the North Sea 10 nautical miles (19 km) south west of the Newarp Lightship ( Trinity House). Her crew were rescued by the cutter Christabel (United Kingdom).
Ran	Sweden	The steamship was destroyed by fire in the North Sea. Her crew were rescued by the schooner Uffo (Denmark). Ran was on a voyage from Saint Petersburg, Russia, to Dunkirk, Nord, France.
Wilhelm I.	Germany	The ship was driven ashore on Skagen, Denmark. Her crew were rescued.

== 11 October ==
List of shipwrecks: 11 October 1875
Ship	State	Description
Eaglet	United Kingdom	The ship was driven ashore at Donna Nook, Lincolnshire. She was refloated on 13 October and resumed her voyage.
Emanuel	Norway	The brig collided with the brig Atlas (Germany) and sank. Her crew were rescued. Emanuel was on a voyage from Hartlepool, County Durham, United Kingdom to Lübeck, Germany.
Exchange	United Kingdom	The brig was abandoned in the North Sea. Her eight crew were rescued by the smacks Ada and Juno (both United Kingdom). Exchange was on a voyage from Aberdeen to Amsterdam, North Holland, Netherlands.
Fox	United Kingdom	The steamship was driven ashore at Saltfleet, Lincolnshire. She was on a voyage from Wisbech, Cambridgeshire, to Hull, Yorkshire. She was refloated on 13 October and resumed her voyage.
Juliette	France	The ship was wrecked at "Carlso", Sweden. Her crew were rescued. She was on a voyage from Copenhagen, Denmark, to Sundsvall, Sweden.
Laurel	United Kingdom	The schooner foundered off the mouth of the Humber. Her crew were rescued. She was on a voyage from South Shields, County Durham, to Caen, Calvados.
Lucinde	United Kingdom	The schooner collided with another schooner and was driven ashore at Seaham, County Durham. Her crew were rescued by the Seaham Lifeboat.
Madeline	United Kingdom	The steamship ran aground off Helsinki, Grand Duchy of Finland. She was on a voyage from Newport, Monmouthshire, to Helsinki. She was refloated and taken in to Helsinki.
Martha	Norway	The barque was wrecked at Kjerringvik with loss of life.
Migrator	United Kingdom	The ship was driven ashore at Saltfleet.
Neba	Russia	The ship was lost near Vadsø, Norway. She was on a voyage from Onega to London, United Kingdom.
Resolute	United Kingdom	The ship was driven ashore at Stege, Denmark. She was on a voyage from Danzig, Germany, to Aberdeen. She was refloated on 17 October.
Rose	United Kingdom	The ship was driven ashore at Seaham. Her crew were rescued.
Success	United Kingdom	The steamship was damaged by fire at Dundee, Forfarshire.
Tasso	United Kingdom	The steamship ran aground in the Scheldt. She was on a voyage from Antwerp, Belgium, to Livorno, Italy. She was refloated with the assistance of four tugs and resumed her voyage.
Unnamed	United Kingdom	A wherry was run down and sunk in the River Tyne by the steamship Dragoon (United Kingdom) with the loss of both crew.

== 12 October ==
List of shipwrecks: 12 October 1875
Ship	State	Description
Catherina Cornelia	Germany	The ship was wrecked near Lemvig, Germany. Her crew were rescued. She was on a voyage from Hamburg to Hammerfest, Norway.
Gezina	Germany	The galiot was driven ashore on Bornholm, Denmark. Her crew were rescued. She was on a voyage from Memel to Bremen.
Normand	(Russian Empire) Grand Duchy of Finland	The ship was wrecked on Jurmo.
Øresund	Denmark	The steamship struck the wreck of L. J. Bager (Sweden) and sank at Falsterbo, Sweden. Her crew were rescued. She was on a voyage from Kronstadt, Russia, to Copenhagen.
Primus	Norway	The barque was abandoned in the North Sea. Her crew were rescued. She was on a voyage from Umeå, Sweden, to London, United Kingdom.
Rolling Wave	United Kingdom	The ship ran aground on the Haven Spit.
S. M. Alexander	United Kingdom	The steam yacht sank at Woodside, Cheshire. She was refloated the next day and taken in to Liverpool.

== 13 October ==
List of shipwrecks: 13 October 1875
Ship	State	Description
Arbitrator	United Kingdom	The ship was run ashore in a waterlogged condition at Saint-Pierre, Saint Pierre and Miquelon. She was on a voyage from Belfast, County Antrim, to Quebec City, Canada. She was a total loss.
Come-on	United Kingdom	The smack foundered in the North Sea. Her crew were rescued.
Cygnet	United Kingdom	The ship sprang a leak off the Goodwin Lightship ( Trinity House). Cygnet was beached on the Haven Spit, in the Thames Estuary. She was on a voyage from Dunkirk, Nord to Great Yarmouth, Norfolk.
Eliza	United Kingdom	The brig was beached at Grimsby, Lincolnshire. She was on a voyage from a Baltic port to a French port.
Magdala	(Canada)	The brig was driven ashore at North Sydney, Nova Scotia.
Margaret	United Kingdom	The schooner ran aground at Fleetwood, Lancashire. She was refloated and beached.
Nile	United Kingdom	The brig was driven ashore near Helsingør, Denmark. She was refloated and taken in to Helsingør.
Notre Dame	United Kingdom	The smack foundered in the North Sea. Her crew were rescued.
Ørnen	Norway	The ship sprang a leak and put in to Copenhagen, Denmark. She was on a voyage from Söderhamn, Sweden, to an English port.
Pensilvania	Italy	The ship was wrecked at Alexandroupoli, Greece. Her crew were rescued.
Prince	United Kingdom	The steamship was driven ashore at Clarenza Point, Greece. She was on a voyage from Patras to an English port. She was refloated and taken in to "Catacola".
Progerss	France	The fishing boat ran aground and was severely damaged at Great Yarmouth.
Roland	France	The steamship collided with Oscar I (Germany) and sank at Pointe-du-Chêne, New Brunswick, Canada.

== 14 October ==
List of shipwrecks: 14 October 1875
Ship	State	Description
Alert	United Kingdom	The smack was driven ashore at Great Yarmouth, Norfolk. She was refloated and taken in to Great Yarmouth.
Ane Margaretha	Denmark	The ketch was driven ashore at Tre Kronor, Stockholm, Sweden. She was on a voyage from Saint Petersburg, Russia, to Christiania, Norway.
Artery	United Kingdom	The smack was lost with the loss of all six crew.
Cœur de Marie	France	The ship was wrecked near Roscoff, Finistère. Her crew were rescued. She was on a voyage from an English port to Paimbœuf, Finistère.
Cygnet	United Kingdom	The ship was driven ashore at Maldon, Essex.
Dagmar	United Kingdom	The steamship ran aground off Königsberg, Germany. She was refloated.
Frederick and John	United Kingdom	The ship was driven ashore near Hamina, Grand Duchy of Finland. She was on a voyage from Kronstadt, Russia, to Great Yarmouth, Norfolk.
Galway Lass	United Kingdom	The ship foundered off Flamborough Head, Yorkshire with the loss of all seven crew.
Hulden	Norway	The brig was driven ashore and wrecked at Middleton, County Durham, United Kingdom. Her crew were rescued.
Lorne	United Kingdom	The steamship ran aground off Königsberg.
Mary Coverdale	United Kingdom	The steamship ran aground in the Dardanelles. She was on a voyage from Porthcawl, Glamorgan, to Galaţi, Ottoman Empire. She was refloated with the assistance of a steamship and resumed her voyage.
May	United Kingdom	The Mersey Flat struck a sunken wreck and foundered off the West Hoyle Bank, in Liverpool Bay. Her crew were rescued. She was on a voyage from "Llandillos" to Sankey Bridges, Cheshire.
Merchant	United Kingdom	The schooner foundered off Hartlepool, County Durham with the loss of all hands.
Meta	United Kingdom	The schooner was driven ashore and wrecked at Great Yarmouth. Her crew were rescued. She was on a voyage from Runcorn, Cheshire, to Great Yarmouth.
Pawzevitz	Denmark	The brig was driven ashore at Hartlepool. She was refloated and taken in to Hartlepool.
Pearl	United Kingdom	The ship ran aground off the west coast of Bornholm, Denmark. She was on a voyage from Saint Petersburg to London. She was refloated the next day.
Rescue	United Kingdom	The ship was driven ashore and wrecked near Trelleborg, Sweden. She was on a voyage from Kronstadt, Russia, to Grangemouth, Stirlingshire.
Robin Hood	United Kingdom	The paddle tug sank at South Shields, County Durham with the loss of three of her four crew. The survivor was rescued by the paddle tug Toiler (United Kingdom).
Savage	United Kingdom	The ship was driven ashore and wrecked at Catanzaro, Italy.
Ville de Aurillac	France	The steamship put into Brest, Finistère on fire. She was on a voyage from Le Havre to Brest and Saint-Nazaire, Loire-Inférieure.
Vixen	United Kingdom	The smack capsized with the loss of all three crew.
William John	United Kingdom	The ship was driven ashore near Hamina, Grand Duchy of Finland. Her crew were rescued. She was on a voyage from Kronstadt to an English port.
Unnamed	France	A smack was driven ashore and sank at Great Yarmouth.

== 15 October ==
List of shipwrecks: 15 October 1875
Ship	State	Description
Admiral Peter Tordenskjold	Norway	The barque was driven ashore at Køge, Denmark. Her crew were rescued. She was on a voyage from London, United Kingdom, to Sundsvall, Sweden.
Aland	Russia	The schooner was abandoned in the North Sea. Her crew were rescued by the steamship Don (United Kingdom), which put three of her crew aboard. Aland was on a voyage from Grimsby, Lincolnshire, United Kingdom, to Kronstadt. She was towed in to the River Tyne in a sinking condition on 17 October.
Albion	United Kingdom	The yawl was wrecked at Pittenweem, Fife with the loss of one of her four crew.
Anne Margarethe	Denmark	The ketch was driven ashore at Tre Kronor, Stockholm, Sweden. She was on a voyage from Saint Petersburg, Russia, to Christiania, Norway.
Astroom	Netherlands	The ship was wrecked at Thisted, Denmark. She was on a voyage from Harlingen, Friesland, to Sundsvall, Sweden.
Castor	United Kingdom	The ship departed from Charlestown, Cornwall for Antwerp, Belgium. No further trace, reported missing.
Catherine and Hannah	United Kingdom	The brig foundered in the North Sea 30 nautical miles (56 km) off Flamborough Head, Yorkshire. Her crew were rescued by a smack. She was on a voyage from South Shields, County Durham, to Hamburg, Germany.
Deusto	Spain	The steamship was wrecked at San Sebastián.
Emilie	Germany	The ship ran aground on the Middelgrund, in the Baltic Sea. She was on a voyage from Wolgast to Jamaica.
Esperance	France	The derelict ship came ashore on the east coast of Öland, Sweden. She was on a voyage from Härnösand, Sweden, to a French port.
Helena	United Kingdom	The ship was driven ashore at Kristianopel, Sweden.
Hercules	Germany	The ship was driven ashore east of Trelleborg, Sweden in a waterlogged condition.
Jahn Augustin	Sweden	The ship was driven ashore at Copenhagen, Denmark. She was on a voyage from Karlshamn to Copenhagen.
Johann Cornelius	Germany	The ship was abandoned off Cruden Bay, Aberdeenshire, United Kingdom with the loss of all but her captain out of her eight crew. She was on a voyage from King's Lynn, Norfolk, United Kingdom, to Rostock.
Kama	Sweden	The brig ran aground and sank at Copenhagen. She was on a voyage from the Gulf of Bothnia to Hartlepool, County Durham, United Kingdom. She was refloated in mid-November and taken in to Copenhagen.
Lusitania	United Kingdom	The ship departed from Newcastle upon Tyne, Northumberland for Porto, Portugal. No further trace, presumed foundered with the loss of all hands.
Progress	France	The fishing boat was driven ashore and severely damaged at Great Yarmouth, Norfolk.
William	Sweden	The schooner was driven ashore at Copenhagen. She was on a voyage from Copenhagen to Stettin, Germany.
Zwei Gebruder	Germany	The ship was driven ashore at Copenhagen. She was on a voyage from Memel to Brake.
Unnamed	France	A lugger was wrecked at San Sebastián.

== 16 October ==
List of shipwrecks: 16 October 1875
Ship	State	Description
Adolph Werner	Germany	The barque was driven ashore at Ny-Hellesund, Norway. She was on a voyage from Grimsby, Lincolnshire, United Kingdom to Malmö, Sweden. She was a total loss.
Ærial	United Kingdom	The brig ran aground at Copenhagen, Denmark. She was on a voyage from Sundsvall, Sweden, to an English port.
Amelia Wilson	United Kingdom	The ship was wrecked near "Barocca de Vicoza", Brazil. She was on a voyage from London to Rio de Janeiro, Brazil.
Amy	United Kingdom	The schooner ran aground and capsized in the River Liffey. She was a total loss.
Ane Elizabeth	United Kingdom	The ship was driven ashore at Dragør, Denmark.
Antoinette	Germany	The schooner sprang a leak and foundered in the North Sea. Her crew were rescued by Jessie (United Kingdom). Antoinette was on a voyage from Brake to Fredrikstad, Norway.
Bruce	New Zealand	The 204-ton steamer hit rocks and foundered near Taiaroa Head while trying to enter Otago Harbour, New Zealand, in a thick fog. She was en route from Timaru to Dunedin. All crew and passengers were saved.
Carl Zuren drei Greifen	Germany	The brig was driven ashore and wrecked at East London, Cape Colony.
Catherine	Russia	The ship was beached near Ystad, Sweden. She was on a voyage from Saint Petersburg to Frederikshald, Norway.
Fidelity	United Kingdom	The schooner drove ashore south of Grimsby. She was refloated.
Johann	Germany	The schooner was abandoned at sea. Her three crew were rescued by the brig Johanna (Germany). Johann was on a voyage from "Sonnaensund" to Großefehn.
Kong Sverre	Norway	The steamship was driven ashore at Dunkirk, Nord, France. She was on a voyage from Kurrachee, India, to Dunkirk. She subsequently broke in two and was a total loss.
Maria Anger	France	The ship foundered off Trégastel, Côtes-du-Nord.
Oden	United Kingdom	The steamship foundered in the North Sea. Her crew were rescued by Andreas (Norway).
Prospero	United Kingdom	The steamship was towed in to Grimsby in a sinking condition by two smacks and was beached. She was on a voyage from Riga, Russia, to Grimsby.
River Boyne	United Kingdom	The ship, which had put in to False Cape Horn, Hoste Island, Chile on fire on 13 October, was scuttled. She was on a voyage from Liverpool, Lancashire, to Valparaíso, Chile. She was refloated on 21 October and resumed her voyage on 28 October.
Romulus	Norway	The ship was driven ashore and wrecked at "Udo". Her crew were rescued. She was on a voyage from London to Fredrikshald.
Unnamed	Flag unknown	A smack was destroyed by fire in the North Sea 100 nautical miles (190 km) south east of Spurn Point, Yorkshire, United Kingdom.

== 17 October ==
List of shipwrecks: 17 October 1875
Ship	State	Description
Deodata	Norway	The barque was driven ashore at Tre Kronor, Stockholm, Sweden. She was on a voyage from Kotka, Grand Duchy of Finland, to Barcelona, Spain.
Domenico Galliano	Flag unknown	The ship caught fire and put in to Batavia, Netherlands East Indies. She was on a voyage from Cardiff, Glamorgan, United Kingdom to Singapore, Straits Settlements.
Helene	Germany	The ship was driven ashore at Falster, Denmark. She was on a voyage from Memel to Hamburg.
Irene	United Kingdom	The schooner foundered in the Atlantic Ocean with the loss of all twenty crew. She was on a voyage from Caernarfon to Quebec City, Canada.
Lina	Germany	The ship was driven ashore and wrecked at Falster. She was on a voyage from Riga, Russia, to Bremen.
Maria	Norway	The ship capsized in the North Sea off Ulvsunda, Sweden.
Perseverante	France	The brigantine was wrecked at Biscarosse, Landes. Her crew were rescued.
Sophie et Julie	France	The schooner-rigged steamship was wrecked at "Cape Arachon" with the loss of 21 lives.
Star of the East	United Kingdom	The barque foundered off Møn, Denmark. Her nine crew were rescued. She was on a voyage from Stettin to Danzig, Germany.
Walhalla	Sweden	The barque ran aground at Aberdeen, United Kingdom. She was refloated and taken in to Aberdeen in a sinking condition.
Ydale	Norway	The barque was driven ashore and wrecked at Romsø with the loss of her captain. She was on a voyage from London, United Kingdom, to Helsingør, Denmark.

== 18 October ==
List of shipwrecks: 18 October 1875
Ship	State	Description
Celebataire	France	The ship was wrecked.
Constance	United Kingdom	The schooner sprang a leak and foundered in the North Sea with the loss of three of her four crew. The survivor was rescued by the barque Alecto (Sweden). Constance was on a voyage from Danzig, Germany, to Newcastle upon Tyne, Northumberland.
European	United Kingdom	The steamship ran aground at Liverpool, Lancashire. She was on a voyage from Liverpool to Calcutta, India. She broke in two and was a total loss. The stern section was refloated on 15 November.
General Cathcart	United Kingdom	The ship was driven ashore near Wigtown.
Hillechina Gesina	Netherlands	The ship was driven ashore at Copenhagen, Denmark. Her crew were rescued. She was on a voyage from Fraserburg, Aberdeenshire, United Kingdom to Königsberg, Germany.
Hunter	United Kingdom	The ship was driven ashore on the Danish coast. She was on a voyage from a Scottish port to Königsberg. She was refloated and taken in to Rønne, Denmark in a leaky condition.
Isabella	United Kingdom	The steamship was driven ashore at Theddlethorpe, Lincolnshire and was abandoned by her crew. She was on a voyage from Gävle, Sweden, to Great Yarmouth, Norfolk.
Jane	United Kingdom	The ship ran aground at Fraserburgh and was damaged. She was on a voyage from Fraserburgh to Rotterdam, South Holland, Netherlands.
Johanna Carolina	Denmark	The ship was driven ashore on Öland, Sweden. She was on a voyage from Saint Petersburg, Russia, to Copenhagen.
Kosmopolite	Flag unknown	The brig sprang a leak and foundered off the Isle of Man. Her crew took to the boats, according to a message in a bottle that washed up at Cloghy, County Down, United Kingdom the next day.
Lartington	United Kingdom	The steamship caught fire at Antwerp, Belgium.
Leonora	United Kingdom	The smack was abandoned 8 nautical miles (15 km) off the Brisons, Cornwall. Her crew were rescued. She was on a voyage from Padstow to Porthleven, Cornwall. She was subsequently towed in to Hayle, Cornwall.
Leopold	Russia	The schooner was wrecked at the mouth of the River Tay. Her seven crew were rescued by the Broughty Ferry Lifeboat. She was on a voyage from Middlesbrough, Yorkshire, United Kingdom, to Flensburg, Germany.
Martha	Netherlands	The ship was driven ashore at Copenhagen.
Medina	United Kingdom	The brigantine was towed in to Holyhead, Anglesey in a sinking condition by the tug Kingfisher (United Kingdom).
Richard	United Kingdom	The ship was driven ashore near "Friberg".
Sanspareil	France	The steamship was wrecked near Arcachon, Gironde with the loss of two of her crew. She was on a voyage from Liverpool to the Gironde.
Till	United Kingdom	The Thames barge collided with a steamship and sank in the River Thames at the Custom House, London.
Wahala	Sweden	The ship struck the pier and was severely damaged at Aberdeen, United Kingdom. She was on a voyage from Sundsvall to Aberdeen.

== 19 October ==
List of shipwrecks: 19 October 1875
Ship	State	Description
Britannia	United Kingdom	The steamship ran aground and was wrecked at Lindisfarne, Northumberland. Her 70 passengers were taken off by the Holy Island Lifeboat Grace Darling ( Royal National Lifeboat Institution), which later took off her eighteen crew. Britannia was on a voyage from Newcastle upon Tyne, Northumberland, to Leith, Lothian.
Hector	United Kingdom	The schooner was driven ashore and severely damaged at Beaumaris, Anglesey. Her crew were rescued.
Hulda	Norway	The barque was driven ashore and wrecked at Laytown, County Meath, United Kingdom. Her twelve crew were rescued. She was on a voyage from New York to Dundalk, County Louth, United Kingdom.
Katinka	Germany	The schooner ran aground on the Maplin Sand, in the North Sea off the coast of Essex, United Kingdom. She was refloated.
Kohinoor	United Kingdom	The schooner was driven ashore and severely damaged at Beaumaris. Her crew were rescued.
Mystery	United Kingdom	The schooner was driven ashore and wrecked at Tynemouth, Northumberland, United Kingdom. Her six crew were rescued by rocket apparatus and breeches buoy. She was on a voyage from Portsmouth, Hampshire, to Seaham, County Durham.
Naima	Sweden	The ship was driven ashore on the west coast of Öland.
Unnamed	Flag unknown	A schooner ran aground on the Nore.

== 20 October ==
List of shipwrecks: 20 October 1875
Ship	State	Description
Askur	Norway	The barque ran aground. She was refloated and taken in to Gothenburg, Sweden in a leaky condition.
Canopus	United Kingdom	The steamship was driven ashore in the Sea of Marmora at "Macrikeni", Ottoman Empire. She was on a voyage from Liverpool, Lancashire, to Constantinople, Ottoman Empire. She was refloated and taken in to Constantinople.
Cornelia	Belgium	The fishing trawler was struck by Khedive (United Kingdom) and sunk in the River Scheldt, near Bath, Netherlands with the loss of two of her crew. Khedive was undergoing sea trials prior to delivery.
Fonta	Germany	The schooner was driven ashore and wrecked at St. Andrews, Fife, United Kingdom. Her nine crew were rescued by rocket apparatus and breeches buoy. She was on a voyage from Hamburg to the River Tyne.
Godstands Minde	Germany	The derelict barque was driven ashore at "Redcliffe", Yorkshire, United Kingdom.
Mendora	United Kingdom	The ship foundered in the North Sea off Tunstall, Yorkshire with the loss of at least one life.
Roodee	United Kingdom	The full-rigged ship caught fire at Manila, Spanish East Indies and was scuttled.
Tay	United Kingdom	The steamship ran aground at Grangemouth, Stirlingshire. She was on a voyage from London to Grangemouth.
Young England	United Kingdom	The barque was abandoned off Winterton-on-Sea, Norfolk with the loss of twelve of the seventeen people on board. Four survivors were rescued by the Caister Lifeboat James Pearce ( Royal National Lifeboat Institution); the fifth came ashore at Winterton-on-Sea clinging to the wreck of a boat. Young England was subsequently wrecked on the Cockle Sand. She was on a voyage from "Sarrssand" to London.
Unnamed	Russia	A brig was wrecked at "Santa Martha", near Cariño, Spain. Her crew were rescued.

== 21 October ==
List of shipwrecks: 21 October 1875
Ship	State	Description
Auld Reekie	United Kingdom	The schooner was wrecked on the North Gar, in the North Sea off the coast of County Durham. Her eight crew were rescued the next day by the Seaton Carew Lifeboat. She was on a voyage from Middlesbrough, Yorkshire to Barcelona, Spain.
Bjaerke	Germany	The ship was abandoned at sea. Her crew were rescued. She was on a voyage from an English port to Flensburg.
Dorothy Jobson	United Kingdom	The brig foundered off the coast of Aberdeenshire with the loss of all hands, according to a message in a bottle that washed up at Cowie, Aberdeenshire.
Georgian	United Kingdom	The steamship sank at Cardiff, Glamorgan.
Hermannus Isaac	Netherlands	The ship ran aground and developed a severe leak. She was on a voyage from Saint Petersburg, Russia, to Harlingen, Friesland.
James Murray	United Kingdom	The schooner was wrecked near Muchalls, Aberdeenshire with the loss of all five crew.
John	United Kingdom	The schooner was wrecked at Aberdeen with the loss of all four crew.
Laurel	United Kingdom	The schooner sank in the North Sea off Hornsea, Yorkshire. Her crew were rescued by the smack Elizabeth.
Lizzie	(United Kingdom of Great Britain and Ireland) Isle of Man	The steamship sank at "Rosglass", County Antrim. She was on a voyage from Swansea, Glamorgan, to Belfast, County Antrim.
Mary Jane	United Kingdom	The ship foundered off the coast of Forfarshire with the loss of all hands.
Poussin	Norway	The barque was abandoned in the North Sea off Wells-next-the-Sea, Norfolk, United Kingdom by ten of her crew, her captain remaining aboard. She was on a voyage from Gävle, Sweden, to Antwerp, Belgium. She was assisted in to Grimsby, Lincolnshire, United Kingdom by the pilot cutter No. 1 and a tug (both United Kingdom)
Unnamed	Netherlands	A derelict schooner was driven ashore south of Aldeburgh, Suffolk, United Kingdom.

== 22 October ==
List of shipwrecks: 22 October 1875
Ship	State	Description
Bacigue Haisch	Norway	The ship was wrecked at Peterhead, Aberdeenshire, United Kingdom. She was on a voyage from Sunderland, County Durham, United Kingdom, to Christiania.
Baumeister	Germany	The schooner was driven ashore and wrecked at Peterhead. Her crew were rescued, but three pilots were drowned rescuing them.
Blooming Lily	United Kingdom	The dandy collided with the brigantine Louisa (France) and foundered in the North Sea 20 nautical miles (37 km) east of Great Yarmouth, Norfolk. Her crew were rescued by Louisa.
Concordia	Denmark	The schooner was driven ashore and wrecked on Eday, Orkney Islands, United Kingdom with the loss of all hands. She was on a voyage from Newcastle upon Tyne, Northumberland, United Kingdom, to Nyborg.
D. B. R.	United Kingdom	The barque ran aground on the Nidingend Reef, in the Kattegat. She was on a voyage from Kronstadt, Russia, to London. She was later refloated.
Dehrend	Germany	The barque was wrecked on the Bullars of Buchan Rocks, off the coast of Aberdeenshire with the loss of all twelve crew.
Eaglet	United Kingdom	The brigantine was driven ashore at Sunderland. Her crew were rescued. She was refloated on 12 November.
Hyack	Norway	The barque was wrecked north of Scotstown Head, Aberdeenshire. Her crew were rescued by rocket apparatus. She was on a voyage from Sunderland to Christiania.
Isabella Miller	United Kingdom	The schooner was driven ashore and wrecked at Aberdeen. Her five crew were rescued by the Aberdeen Lifeboat. She was on a voyage from London to East Hartlepool, County Durham.
Ivar	Denmark	The ship was driven ashore at Gothenburg. She was on a voyage from Nyborg to Plymouth, Devon, United Kingdom. She was later refloated and placed under repair.
John and Isabella	United Kingdom	The brig was driven ashore and wrecked at Dunnottar Castle, Aberdeenshire with the loss of all seven crew.
Mercur	Sweden	The brig was driven ashore and wrecked at Gourdon, Aberdeenshire. Six crew were rescued by rocket apparatus. She was on a voyage from Oscarshamn to Hartlepool, County Durham.
Nathalie	France	The steamship ran aground near "Carlos". She was on a voyage from Le Havre, Seine-Inférieure to Reval, Russia.
Nathaniel Jacobin	Denmark	The smack was driven ashore and wrecked at Peterhead. She was on a voyage from Falkenberg, Sweden, to Bo'ness, Lothian, United Kingdom.
Neptune	Denmark	The barque ran aground at Pechora, Russia.
Superior	Sweden	The brig was driven ashore and wrecked at Muchalls, Kincardineshire, United Kingdom with the loss of all hands, eight or nine lives. She was on a voyage from Hull, Yorkshire, United Kingdom, to Copenhagen, Denmark.
Three Sisters	United Kingdom	The Thames barge collided with the Thames Barge Thomas Etherden (United Kingdom) and sank in the River Thames at Gravesend, Kent.
Trio	Sweden	The schooner was abandoned in the North Sea south of the Farne Islands, Northumberland. Her six crew were rescued by the steamship London (United Kingdom). Trio was on a voyage from Cimbritshamn to London, United Kingdom. She came ashore in the Farne Islands. She was refloated on 25 October and taken in to Lindisfarne, Northumberland in a waterlogged condition.
Ulrich von Hutton	Germany	The brig was wrecked near Newton, Northumberland. Her crew were rescued.
Vidar	Norway	The brig was wrecked at the mouth of the River Tay. Her eight crew were rescued by the Broughty Ferry Lifeboat Mary Hartley ( Royal National Lifeboat Institution). Vidar was on a voyage from Drammen to Tayport, Fife, United Kingdom.
Unnamed	Germany	A barque was driven ashore and wrecked at "Blackwater", south of Rattray Head, Aberdeenshire. Her ten crew were rescued by rocket apparatus.
Unnamed	United Kingdom	A schooner ran aground on the North Bull, in the Irish Sea off the coast of County Dublin.

== 23 October ==
List of shipwrecks: 23 October 1875
Ship	State	Description
Alston	United Kingdom	The steamship collided with the steamship Vandalid (Germany) in the Elbe and ran aground.
Altona	Germany	The steamship ran aground on the Beacon Rock, off the coast of County Durham, United Kingdom and was wrecked. Her thirteen crew were rescued by the Monkwearmouth Lifeboat Good Templar ( Royal National Lifeboat Institution). Altona was on a voyage from Hamburg to Sunderland, County Durham.
Antigua	United Kingdom	The full-rigged ship was run into by the steamship Eider (United Kingdom) and sank at Demerara, British Guiana. Antigua was on a voyage from Greenock, Renfrewshire to Demerara.
Augusta	Germany	The barque was wrecked at Longhaven, Aberdeenshire, United Kingdom. She was on a voyage from Christiania, Norway, to Thurso, Caithness, United Kingdom.
Espiegle	France	The sloop collided with the barque Mathilde (France) in the Bristol Channel. She put in to Cardiff, Glamorgan, United Kingdom in a sinking condition.
Julie Gass	United Kingdom	The ship foundered off Salthouse Head, Scotland with the loss of all hands.
Mediateur	France	The schooner was driven ashore and wrecked 3 nautical miles (5.6 km) east of Lossiemouth, Moray, United Kingdom. Her crew were rescued by rocket apparatus. She was on a voyage from Antwerp, Belgium, to Sunderland, County Durham.
Mentor	Germany	The barque was driven ashore and severely damaged at Dundee, Forfarshire, United Kingdom. She was on a voyage from Vyborg, Grand Duchy of Finland, to Dundee. She was refloated and taken in to Dundee.
Post	Norway	The ship was towed in to Blyth, Northumberland, United Kingdom in a capsized condition.
Regina	United Kingdom	The brig was driven ashore and wrecked at Kessingland, Suffolk. She was on a voyage from Boulogne, Pas-de-Calais, France to Grimsby, Lincolnshire.
Roodee	United Kingdom	The ship caught fire at Hong Kong and was scuttled.
Saucy Jack	United Kingdom	The ship was driven ashore and wrecked at Great Yarmouth, Norfolk. Her four crew were rescued by the Great Yarmouth Lifeboat Abraham Thomas ( Royal National Lifeboat Institution). Saucy Jack was on a voyage from Great Yarmouth to Seaham, County Durham.
Suomitra	Sweden	The brig was towed in to Arendal, Norway in a waterlogged condition. She was on a voyage from Haparanda to Liverpool, Lancashire, United Kingdom.

== 24 October ==
List of shipwrecks: 24 October 1875
Ship	State	Description
Harlingen	Norway	The schooner was abandoned in the North Sea. Her crew were rescued by the steamship Braemar (United Kingdom). Harlingen was on a voyage from Helsinki, Grand Duchy of Finland, to Harlingen, Friesland, Netherlands.
Lochbulig	United Kingdom	The schooner was wrecked on Lambay Island, Formosa. Her crew were rescued.
Rudolf	Germany	The ship was driven ashore in a capsized condition at Arbroath, Forfarshire, United Kingdom.
William Rawcliffe	United Kingdom	The schooner was run into by a steamship and sank off Crosby, Lancashire with the loss of one of her two crew. She was on a voyage from Whitehaven, Cumberland, to Runcorn, Cheshire.

== 25 October ==
List of shipwrecks: 25 October 1875
Ship	State	Description
Auguste	Germany	The brig sprang a leak and was beached in the Pentland Firth, where she was wrecked. Her eight crew were rescued. She was on a voyage from Hartlepool, County Durham, United Kingdom to Wismar.
Anna A. Rich	Canada	The ship was driven ashore. She was on a voyage from Richibucto, New Brunswick, to Liverpool, Lancashire, United Kingdom. She was refloated and resumed her voyage.
Cuba	Norway	The brig ran aground on the Burnham Flats, off the coast of Norfolk, United Kingdom. She was refloated with assistance from the Brancaster Lifeboat and taken in to King's Lynn, Norfolk.
Emma	United Kingdom	The schooner ran aground in the River Gipping. She was refloated.
Gyda	Norway	The schooner was discovered off Inchcape, Fife, United Kingdom in a capsized condition by the paddle tug Triumph (United Kingdom). Gyda was towed to Montrose, Forfarshire, United Kingdom by Triumph and was righted. She was then towed in to Montrose by Triumph and the paddle tug Bob Chalmers (United Kingdom).
John Wells	United Kingdom	The steamship ran aground in the River Ouse at Goole, Yorkshire.
LaSalle	United States	During a voyage from Chicago, Illinois, to Buffalo, New York, with a cargo of 22,000 bushels of wheat, the three-masted schooner lost her rudder on Lake Michigan during a gale and was driven ashore at Two Rivers Point (now Rawley Point) on the coast of Wisconsin. Her crew survived. The wreck was stripped and abandoned. It lies in 12 feet (3.7 m) of water at 44°11.524′N 087°30.591′W in the Wisconsin Shipwreck Coast National Marine Sanctuary.
Margaretta	Netherlands	The galiot was taken in to Grimsby, Lincolnshire, United Kingdom in a derelict condition.
Olga	(Russian Empire) Grand Duchy of Finland	The ship was wrecked near Colliston, Forfarshire, United Kingdom. Her crew were rescued. She was on a voyage from Hull, Yorkshire, to Copenhagen, Denmark.
Rapid	United Kingdom	The fishing smack was driven ashore and wrecked at Aith, Shetland Islands. Her crew were rescued.
William Rawcliffe	United Kingdom	The schooner collided with the steamship Balbec (France) and sank off Crosby, Lancashire, United Kingdom. She was on a voyage from Whitehaven, Cumberland, to Runcorn, Cheshire.

== 26 October ==
List of shipwrecks: 26 October 1875
Ship	State	Description
Elina	United Kingdom	The schooner was driven ashore at Aberdeen.
Excel	United Kingdom	The schooner was abandoned in the Irish Sea 20 nautical miles (37 km) south west of the Calf of Man, Isle of Man. She was on a voyage from Limerick to Swansea, Glamorgan.
Hannah Maria	Russia	The ship ran aground on the Lillegrunden, in the Baltic Sea. She was on a voyage from Helsinki, Grand Duchy of Finland, to London, United Kingdom. She was refloated the next day.
Loch Laggan	United Kingdom	The ship was sighted whilst on a voyage from Liverpool, Lancashire, to Melbourne, Victoria. No further trace, presumed foundered with the loss of all on board, at least 130 lives.
Kea	Germany	The galiot was driven ashore at Arbroath, Forfarshire, United Kingdom. She was on a voyage from Fredrikstad, Norway, to Papenburg. She was refloated with the assistance of a tug and towed in to Arbroath.
St. Mungo	United Kingdom	The barque was run into by the steamship Princess Alexandra (United Kingdom) and sank off Craigavad, County Down. Her crew were rescued by Princess Alexandra. St. Mungo was on a voyage from Troon, Ayrshire, to Dublin.
Thessalia	United Kingdom	The ship was driven ashore and wrecked at Craster, Northumberland. . She was on a voyage from Kronstadt, Russia, to Hartlepool, County Durham, United Kingdom.

== 27 October ==
List of shipwrecks: 27 October 1875
Ship	State	Description
Atalanta	Norway	The ship was driven ashore at Littlestone, Kent, United Kingdom. She was on a voyage from Dunkirk, Nord, France to Saint Thomas, Virgin Islands. She was refloated and towed in to Dover, Kent.
Grenada	United Kingdom	The ship ran aground off the Sapudi Islands, Netherlands East Indies. She was on a voyage from Greenock, Renfrewshire to Java, Netherlands East Indies. She was refloated
Harriet McBeath	United Kingdom	The ship was driven ashore between "Duncany" and Annagassan, County Louth. Her fourteen crew were rescued. She was on a voyage from Africa to Liverpool, Lancashire.
Julia	(United Kingdom of Great Britain and Ireland) Guernsey	The ship ran aground on the Oaze Sand, in the Thames Estuary. She was refloated and taken in to the River Thames in a severely leaky condition and was beached at Rosherville, Kent.
Quinta	Netherlands	The steamship collided with the steamship Phœnix (Netherlands) and ran aground near Maassluis, South Holland. She was on a voyage from Kronstadt, Russia, to Rotterdam, South Holland.. She was refloated.
Sarpedon	United Kingdom	The barque capsized in the Atlantic Ocean. Her crew were rescued by Brimiga and Mary Hogart (United Kingdom). Sarpedon was on a voyage from Gaspé, Quebec, Canada to Queenstown, County Cork.
W. Chapman	Belgium	The steamship ran aground on the Horn Reef, in the North Sea off the German coast. Her crew were rescued by the steamships Langley (United Kingdom) and Mercur (Germany). W. Chapman was on a voyage from Rotterdam, South Holland, Netherlands to Danzig, Germany.
Verein	Germany	The ship was driven ashore at Trelleborg, Sweden. She was on a voyage from Danzig to London, United Kingdom. She was refloated and towed in to Copenhagen, Denmark.
William and Nancy	United Kingdom	The ship was driven ashore in Luce Bay.
Zeitun	United Kingdom	The ship was beached near Porto Torres, Sardinia, Italy. She was on a voyage from Bône, Algeria, to Cette, Hérault, France. She was a total loss.

== 28 October ==
List of shipwrecks: 28 October 1875
Ship	State	Description
Annie	United Kingdom	The Mersey Flat sank at Liverpool, Lancashire.
Bargany	United Kingdom	The ship was driven onto the Pluckington Bank, in Liverpool Bay. She was on a voyage from Calcutta, India, to Liverpool. She was refloated and taken in to Liverpool.
Beatrice	Germany	The brig ran aground at Trelleborg, Sweden. She was on a voyage from Danzig to Gloucester, United Kingdom. She was refloated.
Earl of Zetland	United Kingdom	The schooner ran aground and sank at Bromborough, Cheshire. She was on a voyage from Burry Port, Glamorgan, to Liverpool.
Françoise Marie	France	The ship ran aground at "Wallo North", Sweden. She was on a voyage from Härnösand, Sweden, to Caen, Calvados.
Grangemouth	United Kingdom	The ship ran aground on the Maplin Sand, in the North Sea off the coast of Essex. She was refloated and resumed her voyage.
Harriet McBeath	United Kingdom	The ship was driven ashore between Dunsagne, County Meath and Annagassan, County Louth. She was on a voyage from Africa to Liverpool.
Little Fury	United Kingdom	The brigantine was abandoned at sea in a sinking condition. Her crew were rescued by the steamship Pedro Pidal (Spain). Little Fury was on a voyage from Sydney, New South Wales, to Cárdenas, Cuba.
Marie	United Kingdom	The ship was driven ashore near Tromsø, Norway. She was on a voyage from Arkhangelsk, Russia, to a Scottish port.
Mimmi	Flag unknown	The ship was driven ashore at Cruden Bay, Aberdeenshire, United Kingdom.
Minmanneth	United Kingdom	The ship was wrecked in the Laccadive Islands.
Vanderbyl	Flag unknown	The steamship foundered off Douglas, Isle of Man. She was on a voyage from Liverpool to Dumfries, United Kingdom.

== 29 October ==
List of shipwrecks: 29 October 1875
Ship	State	Description
Acapulca	United Kingdom	The ship departed from Holyhead, Anglesey for Valparaíso, Chile. No further trace, presumed foundered with the loss of all hands.
Bittern	Canada	The ship was wrecked on Bear Island. She was on a voyage from Charlottetown, Prince Edward Island, to Barbados.
Elvira	United Kingdom	The steamship ran aground in the Clyde at Greenock, Renfrewshire. She was refloated.
Louisa and Charlotte	United Kingdom	The derelict ship was driven ashore near Lerwick, Shetland Islands.
Marie	Germany	The ship was driven ashore and wrecked at Copister, Yell, Shetland Islands. She was on a voyage from Rotterdam, South Holland, Netherlands to Riga, Russia.
Moura III	Portugal	The ship foundered 50 nautical miles (93 km) off Lanzarote, Canary Islands. Her crew were rescued. She was on a voyage from Madeira to Lisbon.
Nation's Hope	New South Wales	The ship was driven ashore and wrecked at Esquimalt, British Columbia, Canada. She was on a voyage from Japan to Vancouver Island, British Columbia.
Sarah Love	United Kingdom	The barque sank between Bornholm, Denmark and Falsterbo, Sweden. Her crew were rescued by the steamship Reserven (Germany).

== 30 October ==
List of shipwrecks: 30 October 1875
Ship	State	Description
Ann	United Kingdom	The ship was abandoned 23 nautical miles (43 km) north east of the Bishop's Rock Lighthouse, Cornwall. Her crew were rescued by J. and E. Channiley (Flag unknown). Ann was on a voyage from Portmadoc, Caernarfonshire, to Cardiff, Glamorgan.
Edith	United Kingdom	The ship ran aground on the Whittaker Sand, in the Thames Estuary. She was refloated and taken in to Gravesend, Kent in a waterlogged condition.
Fjerde November	Norway	The ship was driven ashore on Nidingen, Sweden. She was on a voyage from Vyborg, Russia, to the Nieuw Diep. She was refloated with the assistance of a steamship.
Glasgow	United Kingdom	The schooner was wrecked at Youghal, County Cork with the loss of all hands.
Gleaner	United Kingdom	The brigantine was driven ashore at Youghal with the loss of all five crew. She was on a voyage from Port Albert, Victoria to Cork.
Water Witch	United Kingdom	The Mersey Flat sank off "New York".

== 31 October ==
List of shipwrecks: 31 October 1875
Ship	State	Description
Brunette	New Zealand	The 18-ton cutter stranded on sunken rocks at Tairua and became a wreck.
Hugh	United Kingdom	The Mersey Flat sank near Liverpool, Lancashire.
Ithuriel	France	The steamship ran aground in the Gironde. She was on a voyage from the Malabar Coast, India to Bordeaux, Gironde. She was refloated on 2 November and towed in to Bordeaux.
Lyaspi	Spain	The ship was wrecked on Simara Island, Spanish East Indies. She was on a voyage from Manila to Yloilo.
Magenta	French Navy	An accidental nighttime galley fire aboard the Magenta-class broadside ironclad while she was in port at Toulon, France, spread out of control and reached her after ammunition magazine, causing her to explode and sink 2 hours 55 minutes after the fire broke out.
Spectre	Canada	The brigantine sank off the Gunfleet Sand, in the North Sea off the coast of Essex, United Kingdom. Her crew were rescued. She was on a voyage from Saint Petersburg, Russia, to Southampton, Hampshire, United Kingdom.
Waterwitch	United Kingdom	The Mersey Flat sank near Liverpool.

== Unknown date ==
List of shipwrecks: Unknown date in October 1875
Ship	State	Description
Ada and Alice	United Kingdom	The ship was driven ashore in Ballywalter Bay. She was on a voyage from Ardrossan, Ayrshire, to Newport, Monmouthshire. She was refloated.
Albert Gallatin	United Kingdom	The brig was abandoned in the Pacific Ocean. Her crew were reported missing. She was on a voyage from Antwerp, Belgium, to Callao, Peru.
Alexandra	United Kingdom	The schooner was driven ashore and wrecked on the north coast of Taiwan with the loss of all but one of her crew before 28 October. She was on a voyage from Shantou (Swatow) to Tianjin (Tientsin), China.
Alexandrious	Greece	The barque was wrecked in the Gaboon River, Africa.
Altona	Germany	The steamship was wrecked at Sunderland, County Durham, United Kingdom. Her fourteen crew were rescued by the Sunderland Lifeboat Good Templar ( Royal National Lifeboat Institution).
Amsterdam	Netherlands	The barque was driven ashore at "Sierolovklint", Denmark. Her crew were rescued.
Ann	United Kingdom	The coaster foundered with the loss of all hands. She was on a voyage from Newry, County Antrim, to Bangor, County Down.
Ann Mills	United Kingdom	The barque foundered in the Bay of Biscay with the loss of all but her captain. The survivor was rescued by a French brig.
Antigua	United Kingdom	The ship foundered off the Demerara Lightship ( Royal National Lifeboat Institution), off the coast of British Honduras.
Argo	United Kingdom	The ship was wrecked. She was on a voyage from London to Sault-au-Cochon, Quebec, Canada.
Argo	Norway	The barque was abandoned in the North Sea. Her crew were rescued by the smack Denby (United Kingdom). Argo was subsequently taken in to Grimsby, Lincolnshire on 25 October by two smacks.
Aura	(United Kingdom of Great Britain and Ireland) Jersey	The ship was abandoned at sea before 21 October. Her crew were rescued. She was on a voyage from Rio de Janeiro, Brazil, to Gaspé, Quebec, Canada.
Bessie Young	United Kingdom	The ship was driven ashore on the Île d'Orléans, Quebec. She was on a voyage from Maryport, Cumberland, to Quebec City, Canada.
Bisce	Germany	The ship foundered in the North Sea. Ten crew were rescued. She was on a voyage from Kronstadt, Russia, to Bremerhaven.
Buoni Amici	Italy	The ship was driven ashore 12 nautical miles (22 km) east of Barcelona, Spain. She was on a voyage from Cartagena, Spain, to nMarseille, Bouches-du-Rhône, France.
Camille Cavour	Peru	The extreme clipper was abandoned off the coast of Mexico. She was on a voyage from Port Discovery, Washington to a Peruvian port. She came ashore near Manzanillo, Mexico.
Caroline Louise	United Kingdom	The ship ran aground at Mandal, Norway.
Catherina	Germany	The ship was wrecked on Düne, Heligoland with the loss of one of her four crew.
Celebataire	France	The brig was wrecked.
Countess	Canada	The barque was in collision with a British steamship off the Isle of Man and was abandoned by her crew. She was on a voyage from Halifax, Nova Scotia, to Liverpool, Lancashire, United Kingdom. She was towed in to Greenock, Renfrewshire, United Kingdom by the steamship Cumbrae (United Kingdom) on 22 October.
E. Chambers	United States	The ship was driven ashore on the Isle aux Morts, Newfoundland Colony.
Elena	United States	The ship was driven ashore on "Chester Island". She was on a voyage from Ivigtût, Greenland, to Philadelphia, Pennsylvania. She was refloated.
Elizabeth	United Kingdom	The schooner was wrecked. Her four crew were rescued by the Seascale Lifeboat.
Ellon Castle	United Kingdom	The barque was wrecked at Yantai, China. She was on a voyage from Niuzhuang to Amoy.
Elvira	United Kingdom	The barque was driven ashore on "Chester Island".
England	United Kingdom	The ship was wrecked on the north coast of Formosa before 17 October. Her crew were rescued. She was on a voyage from Singapore, Straits Settlements, to Shanghai, China.
Essere	France	The brig was driven ashore at Aquin, Haiti. She was refloated in late October.
Eugenia	Germany	The ship was abandoned at sea before 28 October. Her crew were rescued. She was on a voyage from London to Valparaíso, Chile.
Eva	Germany	The brig ran aground on the Marquesas Keys. She was on a voyage from Minatitlán, Mexico to Hamburg. She was refloated and taken in to Key West, Florida, United States.
Francis	United Kingdom	The ship was wrecked on the coast of Labrador, Newfoundland Colony before 22 October.
Fruhling	Germany	The schooner was wrecked on the coast of the Baltic Sea. Her crew were rescued by the fishing cutter Contrast (United Kingdom).
Gertrude	Denmark	The ship was abandoned in the North Sea.
Good Templar	Royal National Lifeboat Institution	The lifeboat was severely damaged at Sunderland whilst going to the aid of the steamship Altona (Germany).
Harlingen	Norway	The schooner was abandoned in the Baltic Sea. Her crew were rescued by the steamship Braemar (United Kingdom). Harlingen was on a voyage from Helsinki, Grand Duchy of Finland, to Harlingen, Friesland, Netherlands. She came ashore at Hamra, Gotland, Sweden.
H. F. Ulrichs	Germany	The steamship was driven ashore at "Stubben", Denmark. She was on a voyage from Kronstadt to Amsterdam, North Holland, Netherlands. She was refloated and taken in to Copenhagen, Denmark.
Hulda	(Russian Empire) Grand Duchy of Finland	The ship was wrecked at Larvik, Norway. Her crew were rescued. She was on a voyage from Pori to Wisbech, Cambridgeshire, United Kingdom.
Italo	Italy	The brigantine was wrecked near the "Avis Islands". She was on a voyage from Genoa to Curaçao, Curaçao and Dependencies.
Jean Bart	United Kingdom	The ship was wrecked near "Ubo". Her crew were rescued.
Jessie Scott	United Kingdom	The ship was abandoned in the Pacific Ocean off the coast of Chile. Five crew were rescued. She was on a voyage from Liverpool to Guayaquil, Ecuador.
John Pascal	United Kingdom	The ship was destroyed by fire at sea. Eight of her crew were rescued by Africa (United Kingdom); others landed on Ascension Island. John Pascal was on a voyage from Calcutta, India, to New York, United States.
July	France	The barque was abandoned in the North Sea. Her crew were rescued. She was on a voyage from Söderhamn, Sweden, to Le Havre, Seine-Inférieure.
Kepler	United Kingdom	The steamship ran aground on the Whitby Rock. She was on a voyage from Sunderland, County Durham, to Antwerp, Belgium. She was refloated with assistance from the steamship Huntcliffe (United Kingdom) and resumed her voyage.
Kingdom of Saxony	United Kingdom	The ship ran aground on George's Shoal. She was on a voyage from New York to London. She was refloated and resumed her voyage.
Leo	Germany	The brig was wrecked on Lavansaari, Grand Duchy of Finland. She was on a voyage from Kronstadt, Russia to Hartlepool, County Durham, United Kingdom.
Leopold	Russia	The schooner was wrecked on the Abertay Sandbank, off the mouth of the River Tay. Her six crew were rescued by the Broughty Ferry Lifeboat Mary Hartley ( Royal National Lifeboat Institution).
Lotus	United Kingdom	The brig was abandoned in the Pacific Ocean with some loss of life. She was on a voyage from Rio de Janeiro to Callao.
Maid of Kent	United Kingdom	The schooner ran aground on the Shipwash Sand, in the North Sea off the coast of Suffolk in late October. She was on a voyage from London to Newcastle upon Tyne, Northumberland. She was refloated and assisted in to Great Yarmouth, Norfolk in a severely leaky condition.
Margaret Reid	United Kingdom	The schooner ran aground on the Vogelsand, in the North Sea off the coast of Germany. She was on a voyage from Peterhead, Aberdeenshire, to Harburg, Germany. She was refloated and taken in to Cuxhaven, Germany, in a leaky condition.
Marie	United Kingdom	The schooner collided with Otto and Antonie (United Kingdom and sank in the Manicougan Shoals. All on board were rescued.
Martin	United States	The derelict barque was driven ashore at Manzanillo, Cuba, before 30 October.
Mayflower	United Kingdom	The ship foundered in the Atlantic Ocean before 8 October. She was on a voyage from Greencastle, County Antrim to Boston, Massachusetts, United States.
Mayflower	United Kingdom	The ship was driven ashore on Hogland, Russia.
Memi	Sweden	The brig was abandoned in the North Sea. Her crew were rescued by a Dutch smack. She was on a voyage from Gävle to Grimsby.
Meteor	Norway	The barque ran aground at "Hellevaag". She was on a voyage from Loviisa, Grand Duchy of Finland, to Bordeaux, Gironde, France. She was refloated and towed in to Mandal, Norway, in a leaky condition.
Nathalie	France	The steamship ran aground. She was refloated on 26 October with the assistance of a Russian steamship and take in to Reval, Russia.
Nathalia Jacobine	Denmark	The smack was wrecked at Peterhead, Aberdeenshire, United Kingdom. Her four crew were rescued by the Peterhead Lifeboat.
Odin	Norway	The brig was driven ashore on Skagen, Denmark. Her crew were rescued. She was on a voyage from Kristiansand to Aarhus, Denmark.
Orion	United Kingdom	The brig was driven ashore in the Île de Ré, Charente-Inférieure, France. She was on a voyage from Llanelly, Glamorgan, to La Rochelle, Charente-Inférieure. She was later refloated and towed in to La Rochelle, Charente-Inférieure.
Porthan	(Russian Empire) Grand Duchy of Finland	The brigantine was wrecked near Seaton Carew, County Durham. Her nine crew were rescued by the Seaton Carew Lifeboat Job Hindley ( Royal National Lifeboat Institution).
Robert McKay	United States	The ship sprang a leak and was beached at Havana, Cuba. She was on a voyage from Havana to New York.
San Juan	Flag unknown	The ship was wrecked in the "Tortugera River".
Sceptre	United Kingdom	The brig was abandoned at sea. Her crew were rescued. She was on a voyage from Saint Petersburg, Russia, to Southampton, Hampshire.
Stefano	Austria-Hungary	The brig was wrecked at Point Cloates, Western Australia with the loss of fifteen of her crew. She was reported to be on a voyage from Cardiff, Glamorgan, to Hong Kong, China.
Sophie Emily	United Kingdom	The ship was abandoned in the Atlantic Ocean before 12 October. Her crew were rescued. She was on a voyage from Lisbon, Portugal, to Halifax, Nova Scotia, Canada.
Soumetar	Sweden	The ship was abandoned in the Baltic Sea. Her crew were rescued. She was on a voyage from Haparanda to Hartlepool.
Teazer	United Kingdom	The brig was driven ashore at Whitby, Yorkshire. Her nine crew were rescued by the Whitby Lifeboat Robert Whitworth ( Royal National Lifeboat Institution). She was on a voyage from London to Whitby.
Tornado	United Kingdom	The ship was wrecked on Cape Breton Island, Nova Scotia. She was on a voyage from Quebec City to Greenock.
Triton	Norway	The ship was abandoned on the Dogger Bank on or before 2 October.
Wesley	United States	The ship was driven ashore at "Point St. Peter".
Willem Poolman	Netherlands	The ship was destroyed by fire at sea before 15 October. Her crew were rescued.
No. 1	Russia	The barge was abandoned by her crew and drove ashore on the Sazalnitek Spit.
No. 2	Russia	The barge was driven ashore at "Glaffiroffka".
