= Vrouw Maria =

Dutch merchant ship sunk 1771

Coordinates: 59°46′28″N 21°47′10″E

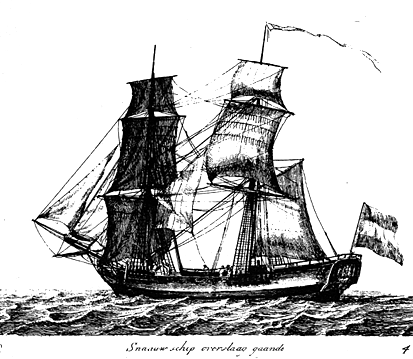
Vrouw Maria

Vrouw Maria (Lady Mary) was a Dutch wooden two-masted merchant ship carrying a valuable cargo of art objects, captained by Raymund Lourens, that sank on 9 October 1771 in the outer archipelago of the municipality of Nagu, Finland, 11 kilometers south-east of the island of Jurmo. In 1999, the ship was discovered by the members of Pro Vrouw Maria, led by Rauno Koivusaari. A dispute between the discoverers and the authorities was later resolved. The ship was in good condition when it was discovered, but only six objects from the deck of the ship have been salvaged. The cargo holds have not been disturbed, so the condition of any art on board remains unknown. The Finnish National Board of Antiquities is responsible for the ship and all recovery efforts.

== History ==
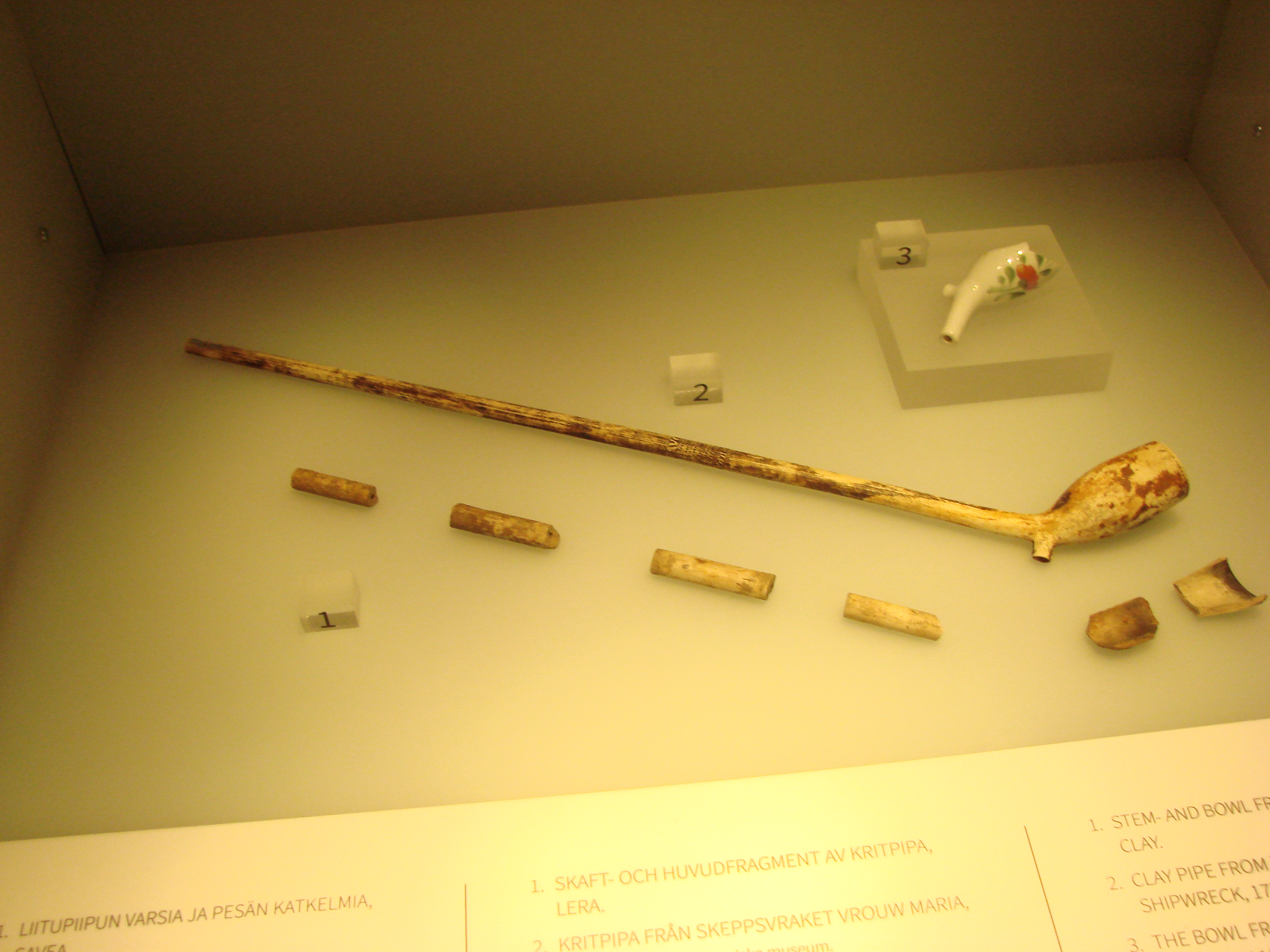
A clay smoking pipe recovered from the shipwreck of Vrouw Maria.

Vrouw Maria was loaded with precious artifacts including works of art belonging to Catherine the Great of Russia. The ship set sail from Amsterdam on 5 September 1771 for Saint Petersburg. One month later, on 3 October, the ship was caught in a storm and ran aground near the island of Jurmo. The rocks caused only minor damage but shortly afterward the ship ran aground again and lost its rudder. The ship was released by a large wave but the crew found it leaking rapidly. Lowering anchor, the crewmen manned the pumps, but the ship continued to take on water.

At dawn on 4 October the decision was made to abandon ship. The crew manned the ship's boats and safely reached nearby rocks, from which they hailed a passing boat. Help arrived the next day, but after several days no progress had been made toward stabilizing the ship, whose pump was clogged with coffee beans from the cargo. On the morning of 5 October the Vrouw Maria sank beneath the waves. While all the crew lived, only a fraction of the cargo was saved.

== Aftermath ==
Various people tried to locate the wreck, but none were successful until Pro Vrouw Maria discovered it in 1999. Interest in the ship rose in the 1970s when Christian Ahlström discovered documents regarding the incident in the national archives of Finland. He published his findings in a book called Sjunkna Skepp in 1979.

=== Cargo ===
The cargo, as declared in Helsingør, Denmark, on 23 September, included sugar, fabrics and dyes. The ship also carried works of art that Catherine the Great had bought at auction in Amsterdam on 31 July 1771. The pieces formerly belonged to Gerrit Braamcamp, a Dutch art collector. The King of Denmark allowed them to pass through customs without any declaration. After the sinking, the Swedish ambassador to St Petersburg, Carl Ribbing, the landlord of Turku and Pori County baron Christopher Rappe, and the foreign minister of Russia, Nikita Panin, discussed the missing cargo but nothing further was done to save it. The paintings Catherine the Great bought are known to have included Paulus Potter's Large Herd of Oxen, bought for Fl. 9050, and Gerard ter Borch's Woman at her Toilette, bought for Fl. 1870, as well as works by Cornelis Coedyk, Gabriel Metsu, The Nursery by Gerard Dou (a triptych of genre scenes bought for Fl. 14,100), Philip Wouwerman, and one of the van Ostade brothers (Adriaen or Isaac).

== See also ==
- Hanneke Vrome
