= Peggy Anderson =

American author and journalist

- Born: July 14, 1938; Oak Park, Illinois
- Died: January 17, 2016 (aged 77)
- Writing career
- Notable work: Nurse

Peggy Anderson (July 14, 1938 – January 17, 2016) was an American author and journalist, best known for her 1979 work Nurse, which profiled the work of a nurse and sold millions of copies.

== Life ==
Anderson was born in Oak Park, Illinois, in 1938, to Catherine Anderson, a nurse, and her husband Wilbert Anderson. She graduated from Augustana College in Rock Island, Illinois, and then joined the Peace Corps. While with the Peace Corps, she taught English for two years in the early 1960s in Togo. After her time in the Peace Corps, she worked as a reporter at The Washington Monthly and The Philadelphia Inquirer (from 1969 to 1973).

She wrote three well-known books: The Daughters (1972), about the Daughters of the American Revolution; Nurse (1979); and Children's Hospital (1985).

Nurse was a major best-seller. The book was an account of the working life of a nurse, based on a pseudonymized series of interviews with a 27-year-old nurse named Philadelphia. The book was made into a movie and a TV series starring Michael Learned, which won an Emmy award. It was suggested that she title the book "Scar Wars" (playing on the recent popularity of the film "Star Wars"), but Anderson stuck with the less sensationalistic title Nurse. The nurse, nicknamed "Mary Benjamin" in the book, at the time insisted on her anonymity, and "steadfastly protected her identity". She was later identified as Mary Fish and became a lifelong friend of Anderson's. For the book, Fish received $2,000 and 5% of profits from the book, for meeting with Anderson for 60 interviews, of two to six hours each.

Anderson's 1972 book The Daughters "was a critical success and financial flop", providing her only a $2,500 advance.

Anderson also had two incomplete manuscripts, one about the murder of her father in Chicago, and another about hospice nursing. The latter book was "almost done" when Anderson died of lung cancer.
