= Peter Donat =

Canadian actor (1928–2018)

- Born: Pierre Collingwood Donat; January 20, 1928; Kentville, Nova Scotia, Canada
- Died: September 10, 2018 (aged 90); Point Reyes Station, California, U.S.
- Education: Acadia University (BA); Yale University
- Occupations: Actor, screenwriter
- Years active: 1953–2003
- Spouses: Michael Learned (m. 1956; div. 1972) Marijke DeJong (m. 1983)
- Children: 3, including Lucas
- Relatives: Robert Donat (uncle)

Pierre Collingwood Donat (January 20, 1928 – September 10, 2018), known as Peter Donat, was a Canadian actor. He was a co-founding company member of the American Conservatory Theater, and a frequent player at the Stratford Festival. He was also known to television audiences for his roles as Elmo Tyson on the primetime soap opera Flamingo Road (1981–82) and as William Mulder, the father of Fox Mulder, on The X-Files (1995–99). He won a Theatre World Award for The First Gentleman (1957), and was nominated for a Genie Award for Best Supporting Actor for The Bay Boy (1984).

== Early life and education ==
Pierre Collingwood Donat was born in Kentville, Nova Scotia, to a Canadian mother Marie (née Bardet) and a British father Philip Ernst Donat, a landscape gardener by trade. His German paternal grandfather, Ernst Emil Donat, immigrated to England from Prussia. His younger brother Richard was also an actor. His uncle was Oscar-winning British actor Robert Donat.

Donat graduated from Acadia University, then studied at the Yale School of Drama. There, he first came to attention as a stage actor in the lead of a production of Cyrano de Bergerac.

In 1961, he played a leading role in Donald Jack's stage play The Canvas Barricade, the first Canadian play performed at the Stratford Festival.

== Career ==
=== Theatre ===
Donat performed in many Shakespearean roles at the Stratford Festival, including A Midsummer Night's Dream, Troilus and Cressida, Julius Caesar, and Falstaff. A chance meeting with Tyrone Guthrie led him to be cast in his first Broadway production, The First Gentleman, earned him a 1957 Theatre World Award.

Donat was a prominent member of the American Conservatory Theater (ACT) in San Francisco for a number of years. He was also active in local theater, most notably playing his first singing role as Professor Higgins in the 1988 Cabrillo Stage production of My Fair Lady.

In 1995, he played Prospero in The Tempest at the Atlantic Theatre Festival.

In 2003, he starred as Hirst in No Man's Land for Toronto’s Soulpepper Theatre.

=== Television ===
In 1965, he was featured in the cast as Vince Conway on Moment of Truth. That series was the only Canadian serial ever broadcast on a commercial television network in the United States.

His credits include: Mission: Impossible, Banacek, The Waltons, Hawaii Five-O, Mannix, Charlie's Angels, Lou Grant, Baa Baa Black Sheep, Captains and the Kings, Rich Man, Poor Man Book II, The Feather and Father Gang, The Eddie Capra Mysteries, Dallas, Quincy, M.E., Hart to Hart, Hill Street Blues, Simon & Simon, Murder, She Wrote, and the 1976 series Sara. He also starred in Cyrano de Bergerac playing the title role, in 1974 on the PBS anthology Theatre in America. He was a regular cast member of the 1980s primetime serial, Flamingo Road as Elmo Tyson, in 1993 on the series Time Trax as the antagonist Dr. Mordecai Sahmbi, and more recently had a recurring role as Bill Mulder, Agent Mulder's father, in The X-Files.

=== Film ===
Donat also worked extensively in films. Some of his more prominent roles included The Hindenburg (1975), F.I.S.T. (1978), The China Syndrome (1979), The War of the Roses (1989), Skin Deep (1989) and The Game (1997). He was shortlisted to play Tom Hagen in The Godfather (1972), though the role ultimately went to Robert Duvall. He would later play Senate Committee lawyer Questadt in The Godfather Part II (1974), and would work with director Francis Ford Coppola again in Tucker: The Man and His Dream (1988).

He also narrated the biographical film chronicling the life and work of famed mythologist Joseph Campbell, The Hero's Journey: A Biographical Portrait (1987) and moderated the multi-volume video series, The World of Joseph Campbell: Transformation of Myths Through Time (1989), giving insightful commentary and celebrating Campbell's brilliance as a scholar and storyteller.

== Personal life ==
Donat was married to actress Michael Learned from 1956 until 1972, when they divorced. They had three children — Caleb, Christopher and Lucas. From 1983 until his death, he was married to his second wife, Marijke.

=== Death ===
Donat died at his home in Point Reyes Station, California, on September 10, 2018, due to complications of diabetes. He was 90.

== Filmography ==
- 1958 Lost Lagoon as David Burnham
- 1967 Der Revolver des Korporals as Hilario
- 1971 My Old Man's Place as Car Salesman
- 1973 The Waltons (TV Series, episode: The Prize) as Oscar Cockrell
- 1974 The Godfather Part II as Questadt
- 1974 Cyrano de Bergerac as Cyrano de Bergerac
- 1974 The Missiles of October (TV movie) as David Ormsby-Gore
- 1975 Russian Roulette as McDermott
- 1975 The Hindenburg as Reed Channing
- 1977 Billy Jack Goes to Washington as Ralph Butler
- 1977 Delta County, U.S.A. (TV movie) as John McCain Jr.
- 1978 Mirrors as Dr. Philip Godard
- 1978 F.I.S.T. as Arthur St. Clair
- 1978 A Different Story as Sills
- 1979 The China Syndrome as Don Jacovich
- 1979 Hanging by a Thread (TV movie) as Mr. Durant
- 1979 Meteor as The Narrator
- 1982 Highpoint as Maronzella
- 1982 Ladies and Gentlemen, The Fabulous Stains as Harley Dennis
- 1982 Mazes and Monsters (TV movie) as Harold
- 1983 I Am Joe's Eye as Voice of Joe's Eye
- 1984 The Bay Boy as Will Campbell
- 1984 Massive Retaliation as Lee Briscoe
- 1985 Honeymoon as Novak
- 1987 Unfinished Business as Ferenzy
- 1988 Tucker: The Man and His Dream as Otto Kerner
- 1989 Skin Deep as "Sparky"
- 1989 The War of the Roses as Jason Larrabee
- 1992 The Babe as Harry Frazee
- 1992 School Ties as Headmaster Dr. Bartram
- 1993 Time Trax as Dr. Mordecai Sahmbi
- 1997 The Game as Samuel Sutherland
- 1997 Red Corner as David McAndrews
- 2001 The Deep End as Jack Hall
- 2001 Never Die Twice
- 2003 Murder, She Wrote: The Celtic Riddle as Eamon Byrne
