= Lucas Donat =

Canadian business executive (born 1962)

Lucas Donat (born 1962) is an advertising executive, former actor, and the Chief Marketing Officer of Constellation, an AI driven SaaS company in the automotive space.

Lucas was formerly the CMO of Autonomy and TrueCar, which he helped take public in 2014. He is also CEO of Tiny Rebellion, where he has helped build many enduring brands.

== Early life ==
Born to actors Michael Learned and Peter Donat in Toronto, Canada, Donat is one of three children. He played the role of Mark Thorn in the 1978 horror movie Damien - Omen II.

== Career ==
Donat is considered one of the foremost innovators of advertising and brand building for internet-based companies. As co-founding CEO of Donat/Wald Advertising with his partner Traci Wald in 1987, Lucas has led the advertising and branding efforts for many early stage Internet companies that have gone on to become leaders in their respective categories: eHarmony, LegalZoom, and Hotwire.

In 2014, Donat/Wald changed its name to Tiny Rebellion and took home the distinction of Advertising Age's Small Advertising Agency of the Year for shops under 75 employees. After over 20 years of service to the agency as its CEO and creative head, Donat and Wald sold their shares to a partner that joined them later, but still retain the rights to the Tiny Rebellion name and all of its historical creative assets. Donat has since held the positions of chief marketing officer and chief brand officer of TrueCar, chief marketing officer at Autonomy, and is currently chief marketing officer of Constellation where he is focused on the intersection of creativity and AI in highly regulated industries.

In 2024, Lucas worked with Michelle Pfeiffer and her perfume brand, Henry Rose, to launch an omni-channel ad campaign.

== Personal life ==
A long-time advocate of sustainable farming, Lucas Donat and his wife, Traci, transformed half an acre of their Malibu property into a bustling mini-farm.

In March 2025, The New York Times profiled the Orcas Island cabin of Lucas Donat and his wife.
