= Cyrano de Bergerac (1974 film) =

- DVD cover
- Directed by: William Ball
- Written by: Brian Hooker (translation)
- Based on: Cyrano de Bergerac; 1897 play by Edmond Rostand
- Produced by: Matthew N. Herman
- Starring: Peter Donat; Marsha Mason; Marc Singer; Paul Shenar
- Music by: Lee Hoiby
- Release date: 1974
- Running time: 130 minutes
- Country: United States
- Language: English

Cyrano de Bergerac is a 1974 videotaped television production of Edmond Rostand's famous 1897 play about the lovestruck swordsman with the long nose. This production was originally staged by American Conservatory Theater and shown on PBS as part of the Theater in America series. It uses Brian Hooker's 1923 translation of the play (with some uncredited revisions), and stars Peter Donat as Cyrano, Marsha Mason as Roxane, Marc Singer as Christian de Neuvillette, and Paul Shenar as the Comte de Guise. Kathryn Grant (wife of Bing Crosby) has a brief role as Lise, the unfaithful wife of pastry cook Ragueneau – a role cut in some productions of the play because of its brevity.

The production is available on DVD. Some prints of this seem to be in black and white, but the production was originally made and shown (on PBS) in color. The DVD release is in color.

== Cast ==
- Peter Donat as Cyrano de Bergerac
- Charles Hallahan as Montfleury / Cadet
- John Hancock as Cut Purse
- Marsha Mason as Roxane
- Robert Mooney as Ragueneau
- E. Kerrigan Prescott as Chavigny
- Paul Shenar as De Guiche
- Earl Boen as Le Bret
- Howard Sherman as Jodelet / Cadet
- Marc Singer as Christian de Neuvillette
