= The Nursery (Gerard Dou) =

Lost triptych by Gerard Dou

The Nursery (Dutch: De Kraamkamer) was a triptych of the 1660s in oils on canvas by Gerard Dou, depicting an allegory on the education of art. In the 17th and 18th century, it was considered Dou's masterwork, and one of the best Dutch Golden Age paintings. The work was lost when the merchant ship Vrouw Maria sank in the Finnish outer archipelago on 9 October 1771. A copy by Willem Joseph Laquy (1738–1798) in the Rijksmuseum collection gives an impression of how the painting may have looked.

In January 2025, the painting was featured on the Dutch TV program Gezonken Meesters, where both professionals and amateurs were invited to create a reconstruction of the artwork.

== History ==
Gerrit Dou (7 April 1613 – 9 February 1675), was a Dutch Golden Age painter, whose small, highly polished paintings are typical of the Leiden fijnschilders. He specialised in genre scenes and is noted for his trompe-l'œil "niche" paintings and candlelit night-scenes with strong chiaroscuro. He was a student of Rembrandt.

Dou painted the Nursery in the 1660s. A collector acquired it for the price of 4,024 Guilders. It hung on his wall next to Johannes Vermeer’s The Milkmaid, which he had acquired for only 330 Guilders.

The merchant Gerrit Braamcamp acquired the painting in the 18th century. His collection was auctioned on 31 July 1771. After a fierce bidding war with the representatives of the kings Frederick the Great, Louis XV of France and Stanislaus Augustus of Poland, it was the representative of Empress Catherine the Great, Prince Golitsyn who acquired the painting together with other artworks. He had them packed and sent them on the merchant ship Vrouw Maria to Sankt Petersburg. However, the ship did not arrive as it sank on 9 October 1771 in the outer archipelago of the municipality of Nagu, Finland, 11 kilometers south-east of the island of Jurmo.

== A copy by Willem Joseph Laquy (1770) ==
Thanks to a copy of the Nursery by Willem Joseph Laquy from around 1770, it is possible to make an impression how the Nursery looked like. This painting is in the collection of the Rijksmuseum in Amsterdam.

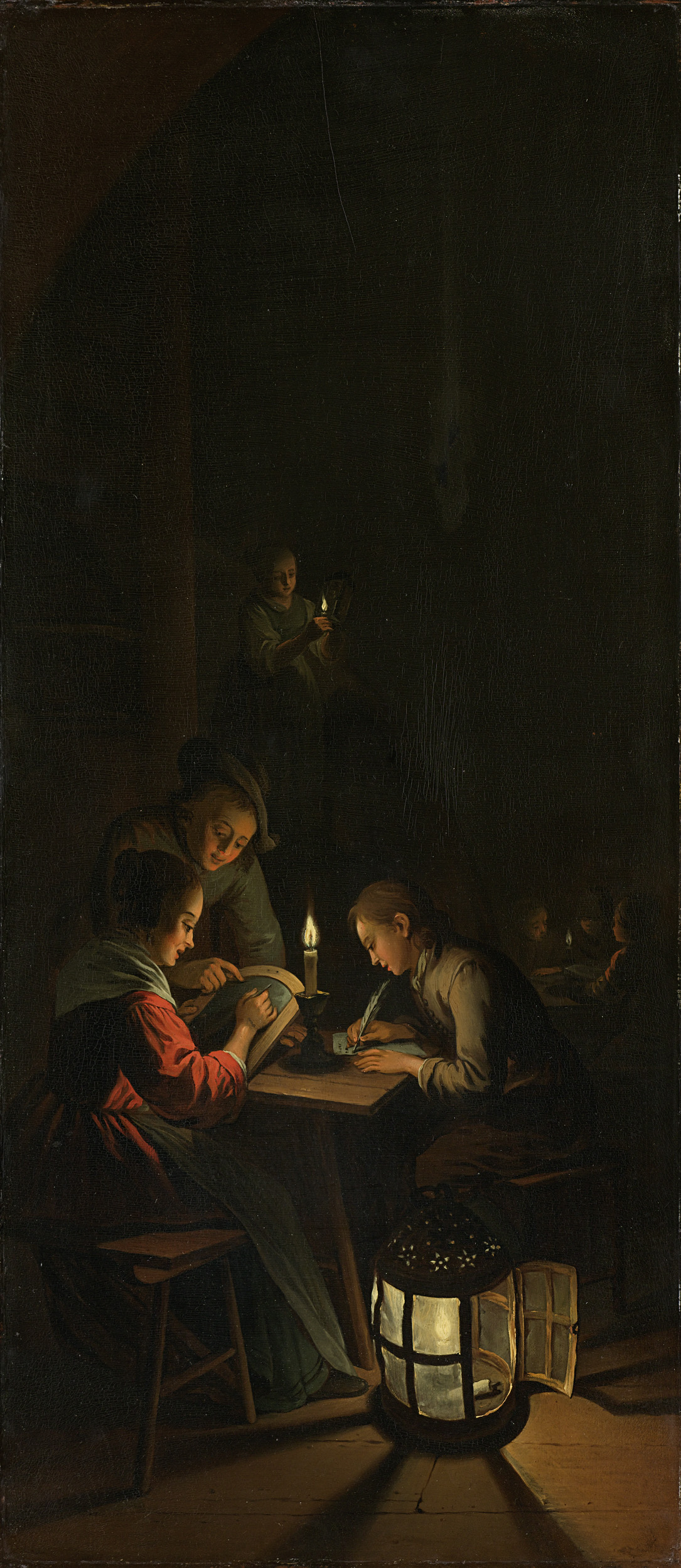
Left panel

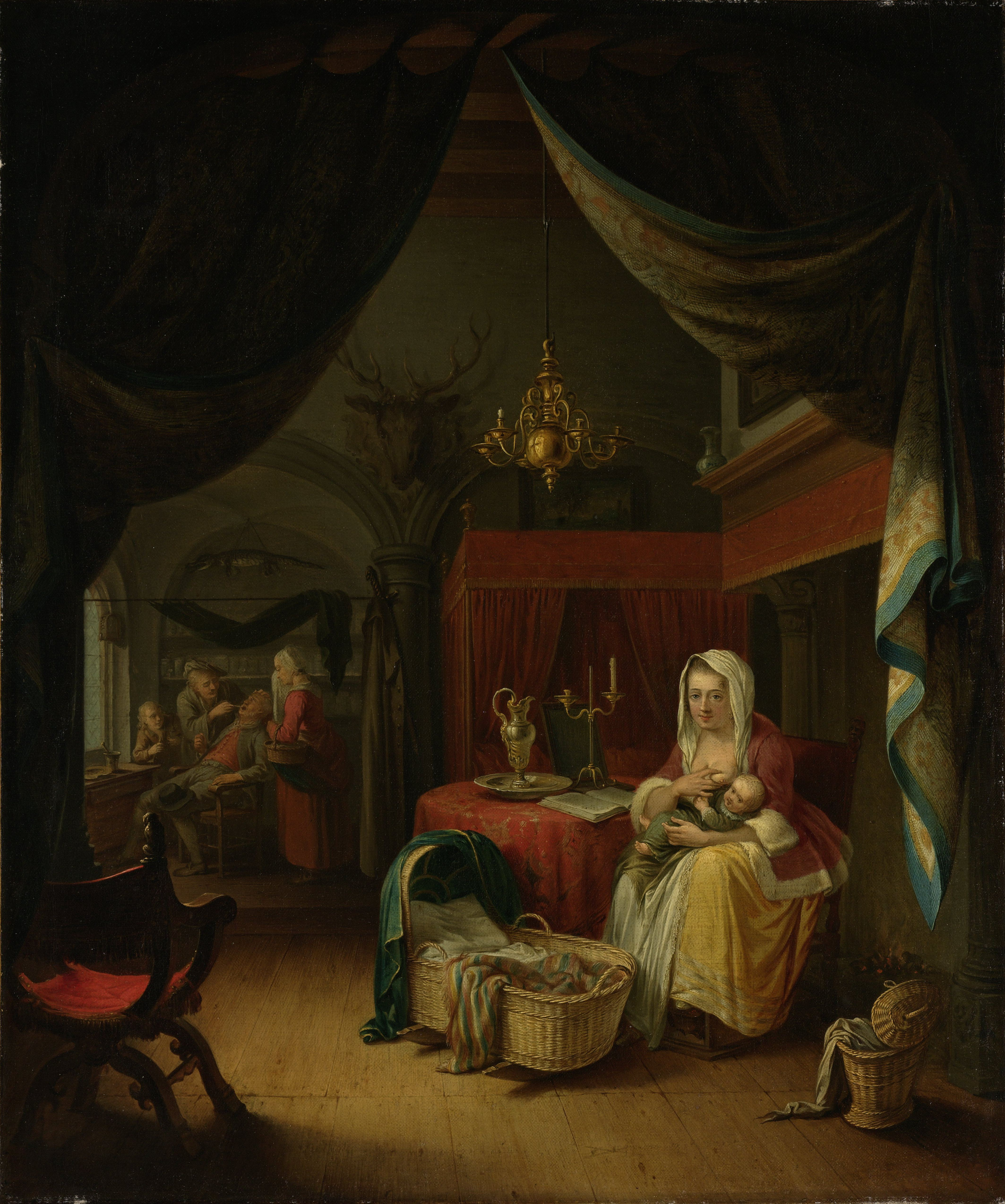
Middle panel

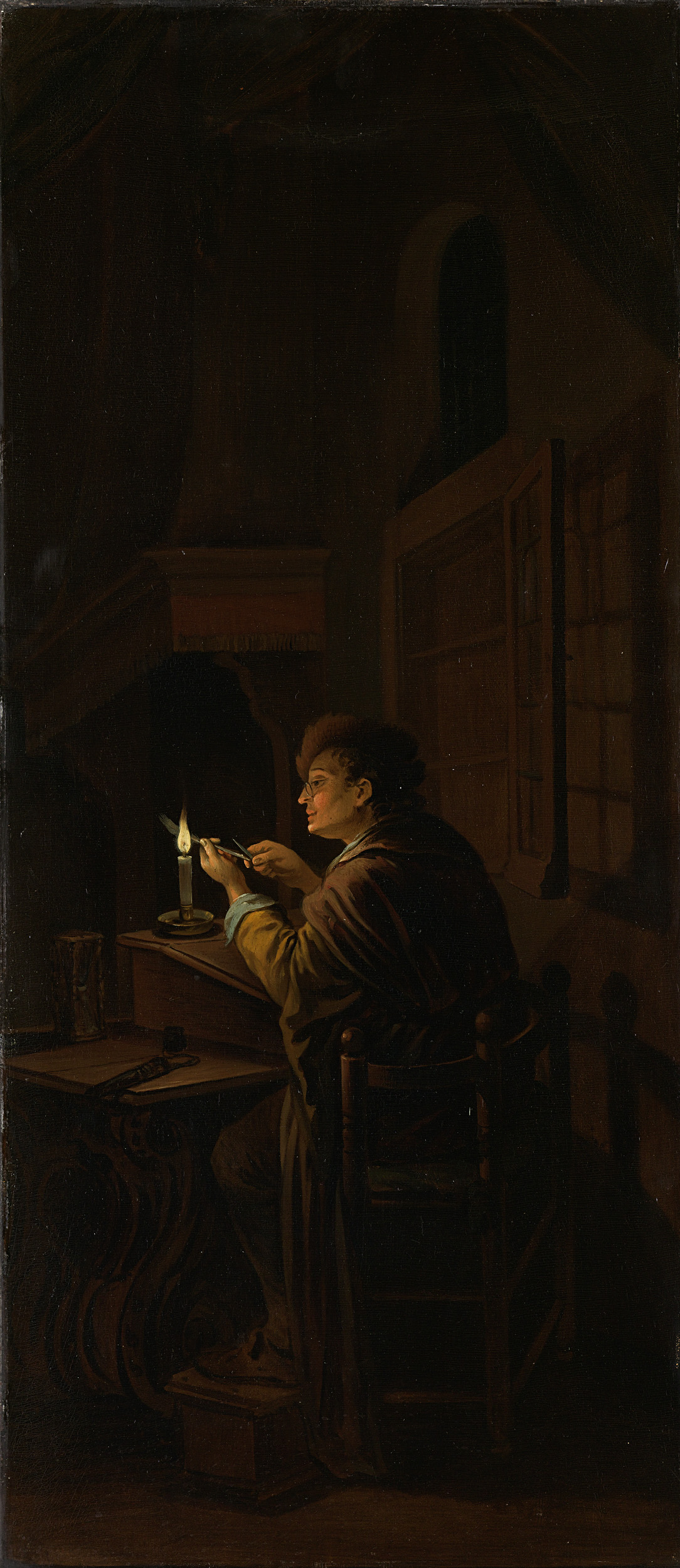
Right panel

== Interpretation ==
The Nursery is a triptych with an allegory on art education. That Gerard Dou chose the form of a triptych for a profane subject is considered very exceptional. The allegory is based on a statement originating from Aristotle, which mentions that three things are needed for a successful education, namely nature, education and practice.

The centre panel depicted a nursery. Seated at a table, a mother breastfeeds her baby. A cradle and a basket stand in front of her on the floor. A chandelier hangs from the ceiling, and the mounted head of a deer hangs on the wall. A dentist is at work in the background. The nursery symbolizes nature.

The left side panel showed an evening school where writing is taught by the light of candles and a lantern. The school symbolizes education.

On the right side panel there was a scholar who cuts a pen in his office by the light of the candle. The pen cutter symbolizes practice.

There are no copies of the outsides of the original side panels. However, they depicted representations of the so-called liberal arts: grammar, rhetoric, dialectic, arithmetic, geometry, astronomy and music.

== Literature ==
- Easter, Gerald; Vorhees, Mara (2020). The Tsarina's Lost Treasure: Catherine the Great, a Golden Age Masterpiece, and a Legendary Shipwreck. New York: Pegasus Books. p. 400. ISBN 978-1643135564.
