= Nursing (disambiguation) =

Nursing is a healthcare profession.

Nursing may also refer to:

- Breastfeeding, sometimes referred to as nursing
- Wet nursing, the act of breastfeeding someone else's child
- Nursing pillow, a cushion for ease of nursing and breastfeeding
- Nursing management, a profession
- Nursing home, a facility for the residential care of older people, senior citizens, or disabled people
- Nursing Research, an academic journal
- Nursing research, research that provides evidence used to support nursing practices
