= Michael Learned =

American actress (born 1939)

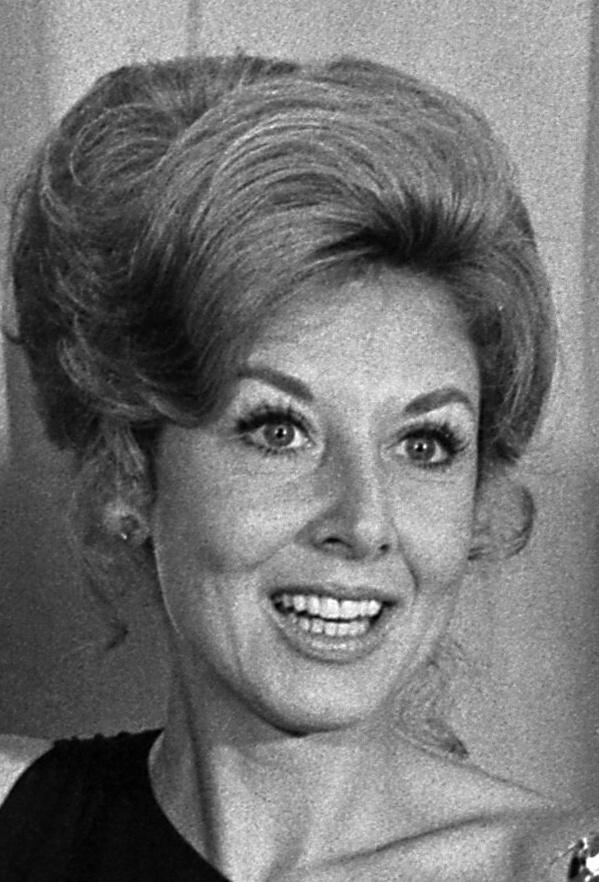
- Learned in 1973
- Born: April 9, 1939 (age 87); Washington, D.C., U.S.
- Occupation: Actress
- Years active: 1961–present
- Spouses: Peter Donat (m. 1956; div. 1972) Glen Chadwick (m. 1974; div. 1977) William Parker IV (m. 1979; div. 1988) John Doherty (m. 1991; died 2025)
- Children: 3, including Lucas Donat

Michael Learned (born April 9, 1939) is an American actress, known for her role as Olivia Walton in the long-running CBS drama series The Waltons (1972–1981). She has won the Primetime Emmy Award for Outstanding Lead Actress in a Drama Series four times, which is tied for the record of most wins with Tyne Daly. Three of the wins were for The Waltons (1973, 1974, 1976), while the other was for Nurse (1981-1982).

== Early life ==
Learned was born in Washington, D.C., the eldest daughter of Elizabeth Duane ("Betti"; née Hooper) and Bruce Learned, a diplomat. Her maternal grandfather also worked for the United States Foreign Service (of the U.S. State Department), and was an attaché for the United States Embassy in Rome (Italy). She has five younger sisters: Gretl, Susan, Sabra, Dorit and Philippa. She lived on a Connecticut farm for the first 10 years of her life. Learned said that her parents never explained why she received a masculine first name, once saying of her father: "All he told me was that if I had been a boy, I would have been named Caleb, but I was a girl, so I was called Michael." When she was 11, Learned moved to Austria, where her father worked for the U.S. Department of State. At this time, she attended Arts Educational School, Tring, (now the Tring Park School for the Performing Arts in Tring, Hertfordshire, England, (United Kingdom). During this time, she discovered the theater and acting, and decided to make acting her life's work.

== Career ==
=== Television and film ===
Her first substantial role in either film / motion pictures or television was as the character Olivia Walton, the wife of John Walton, Sr. on The Waltons drama / nostalgia television series, which ran for nine seasons from 1972 to 1981. For the first five seasons of the show she was billed as "Miss Michael Learned" because she was relatively unknown at the time and producers wished to avoid confusion among viewers about her gender. By the sixth season, as the show continued its success after the departure of co-star Richard Thomas (born 1951), these concerns had been alleviated and the "Miss" was dropped from Learned's billing in the credits. She was nominated for six Emmy Awards as Lead Actress in a Drama, winning three times. After the end of the sixth season, she agreed to appear for one more season on the condition that she would not have to work the full nine months schedule. After the seventh season she left the show. Her character's abrupt disappearance in Season 7 was explained by Olivia developing tuberculosis and entering a sanatorium in hot and dry Arizona. She returned briefly in Season 8 and later appeared in four of the six subsequent Waltons sequel / reunion made-for-TV films and specials made, with three during 1982 and during the 1990s (1993, 1995 and 1997). For her portrayal of Olivia Walton, Learned was also nominated for four Golden Globe Awards. During her run as Olivia Walton, Learned and The Waltons co-star, Will Geer, also appeared together in the 1974 made-for-TV movie Hurricane.

Learned made her big screen debut in 1980, playing the supporting role in the drama film Touched by Love. She later appeared in Power (1986) and Dragon: The Bruce Lee Story (1993), and well as number of made-for-television movies. Learned starred as Nurse Mary Benjamin in the hospital drama Nurse, which ran on the CBS-TV network for six episodes in the spring 1981 and then for the following 1981–1982 seasons. Though the series was well received critically, it was not a big ratings success and lasted only two partial seasons. Nevertheless, Learned was nominated for two Emmy Awards for Outstanding Lead Actress and won yet another Emmy for this role in 1982. She later had starring roles in the unsuccessful 1988 series drama Hothouse and the 1989 sitcom Living Dolls and reprised her Waltons role for a number of television movies and reunions in the 1990s. In 1995, during the second season of The Secret World of Alex Mack, she guest-starred as a ghost who regretted the decisions of her long-estranged granddaughter, revealed at the end to be the show's main villain, Danielle Atron (Louan Gideon). In 2005, Learned played Judge Helen Turner on the ABC-TV network's daytime soap operas All My Children and One Life to Live as part of the "baby switch" storyline on both shows. She guest-starred in Scrubs as Mrs. Wilk in five episodes from the show's fifth season. She played Shirley Smith on ABC's other long-running soap opera General Hospital in 2010. In late 2011, Learned played Katherine Chancellor on the CBS daytime soap opera, The Young and the Restless, filling in for longtime actress Jeanne Cooper, who was on extended medical leave from the series. In 2022, Learned returned to television with starring role in the Netflix limited series, Dahmer – Monster: The Jeffrey Dahmer Story playing Catherine Dahmer, Jeffrey Dahmer's grandmother.

=== Theatre ===
In the late 1960s, Learned and her husband Peter Donat appeared in various roles with the American Conservatory Theater in San Francisco, California. She has appeared in many stage productions on Broadway in off Broadway, in New York City and elsewhere, including the 2006–2007 national touring production of the play On Golden Pond.

In the fall of 2008, she starred in the Innovation Theatre Works' production of Driving Miss Daisy, playing the title role of retired Atlanta, Georgia school teacher Daisy Werthen, opposite Willis Burks II as Hoke and Dirk Blocker as Daisy's son Boolie. She reprised the role opposite Lance E. Nichols as Hoke at the Judson Theatre Company in March 2013.

== Personal life ==
Learned has been married four times. Her first husband was Canadian-American actor Peter Donat (1928–2018), whom she married in 1956 when she was 17 years old. The marriage was dissolved 16 years later in 1972. She had three sons by that marriage, one of whom is actor and business executive Lucas Donat (born 1962). Her second marriage, to Glen Chadwick, lasted only from 1974 to 1976 and also ended in divorce. In 1979, she married actor-screenwriter William Parker. That marriage ended in divorce as well. In 1991, she married lawyer John Doherty and the couple resided in California. Doherty died in 2025.

In a 2002 article she wrote for the Daily Word, a publication of the Unity Church, Learned states that at the time she was cast in The Waltons in 1971, she had "hit rock bottom". Then, at age 32, Learned realized she was an alcoholic. Taking herself to former husband Peter Donat's remote cabin on the California coast, she decided to "get sober" and that her time there was the beginning of a spiritual journey. Learned further stated in the article that she has been sober since 1977.

== Filmography ==
=== Film ===
Year	Title	Role	Notes
1980	Touched by Love	Dr. Bell	
1986	Power	Governor Andrea Stannard	
1993	Dragon: The Bruce Lee Story	Vivian Emery	
1997	Life During Wartime	—N/a	
2000	For the Love of May	Mary Lou	Short film
2005	Lethal Eviction	Elsa	
2005	Loggerheads	Sheridan Bellamy	
2007	The Killer	The Innkeeper	Short film
2009	An American Girl: Chrissa Stands Strong	Nana Louis Hanlon	
2014	Unplugged	Grandma Katie	Short film
2014	The Parcel	Beverly	Short film
2014	After Life	Gloria	
2018	Second Acts	Lee Marston	Short film

=== Television films ===
Year	Title	Role	Notes
1963	The Other Man	—N/a	
1974	Hurricane	Lee Jackson	
1974	It Couldn't Happen to a Nicer Guy	Janet Walters	
1978	Little Mo	Eleanor Tennant	
1980	Nurse	Mary Benjamin	
1980	A Christmas Without Snow	Zoe Jenson	
1982	Mother's Day on Waltons Mountain	Olivia Walton	
1984	The Parade	Rachel Kirby	
1986	A Deadly Business	Ann	
1986	Picnic	Rosemary Sidney	
1986	All My Sons	Kate Keller	American Playhouse
1987	Mercy or Murder?	Skipper	
1988	Roots: The Gift	Amelia Parker	
1990	Gunsmoke: The Last Apache	Mike Yardner	
1991	Aftermath: A Test of Love	Irene	
1991	Murder in New Hampshire: The Pamela Wojas Smart Story	Judy Smart	
1991	Keeping Secrets	Marion Mahoney	
1992	Mattie's Waltz	Mattie	
1993	A Walton Thanksgiving Reunion	Olivia Walton	
1995	A Walton Wedding	Olivia Walton	
1997	A Walton Easter	Olivia Walton	
1998	A Father for Brittany	Edna Humphreys	
2017	Life Interrupted	Marni Woodworth	

=== Television series ===
Year	Title	Role	Notes
1968	Wojeck	Nina Eden	2 episodes
1972–1979	The Waltons	Olivia Walton	168 episodes Primetime Emmy Award for Outstanding Lead Actress in a Drama Series (1973–1974, 1976); Nominated - Golden Globe Award for Best Actress - Television Series Drama (1973–1976); Nominated - Primetime Emmy Award for Outstanding Lead Actress in a Drama Series (1975, 1978–1979)
1973	Gunsmoke	Mike Yardner	Episode: "Matt's Love Story"
1973	Gunsmoke	May Lassiter	Episode: "A Game of Death... An Act of Love Part 2"
1973	Match Game 73	Herself	Episode: "1.6"
1973–1974	Insight	Sister Janet	2 episodes
1974	Police Story	Linda Keitlinger	Episode: "Love, Mabel"
1981–1982	Nurse	Nurse Mary Benjamin	25 episodes Primetime Emmy Award for Outstanding Lead Actress in a Drama Series; Nominated - Primetime Emmy Award for Outstanding Lead Actress in a Drama Series
1984	St. Elsewhere	Sister Millicent Domencia	2 episodes
1988	Hothouse	Dr. Marie Teller	7 episodes
1989	Murder, She Wrote	Maria Hudson	Episode: "Trevor Hudson's Legacy"
1989	Who's the Boss?	Trish Carlin	2 episodes
1989	Living Dolls	Trish Carlin	12 episodes
1990	Wiseguy	Rachel	2 episodes
1994	Reading Rainbow	Herself	Episode: "Appelemondo's Dream"
1995	The Secret World of Alex Mack	Ghost of Paradise Valley	Episode: "The Secret"
1998	Profiler	Helen Waters	3 episodes
1998	Promised Land	Dolly Carstens	Episode: "The Secret of Bluestem"
2000	Pensacola: Wings of Gold	Congresswoman Benedict	Episode: "Article 32"
2000	So Graham Norton	Herself	Episode: "3.8"
2003	Law & Order: Special Victims Unit	Candace Lamerly	Episode: "Privilege"
2005	All My Children	Judge Turner	Episode: "1.9044"
2005	One Life to Live	Hon. Judge Turner	2 episodes
2006	Scrubs	Mrs. Wilk	7 episodes
2009	Cold Case	Louise Patterson '09	Episode: "WASP"
2010	General Hospital	Shirley Smith	21 episodes
2011	Mr. Sunshine	Maggie	Episode: "The Best Man"
2011	The Young and the Restless	Katherine Chancellor	13 episodes
2022	Dahmer – Monster: The Jeffrey Dahmer Story	Catherine Dahmer	

=== Stage ===
Year	Title	Role	Notes
1955	The Tempest	Performer	The American Shakespeare Theatre
1955	Julius Caesar	Performer	The American Shakespeare Theatre
1961	Coriolanus	Virgilia	Stratford Shakespearean Festival
1961	Love's Labour's Lost	Katharine	Stratford Shakespearean Festival
1967	Tartuffe	Elmire	American Conservatory Theater
1968	Glory! Hallelujah!	Margaret Bowden	American Conservatory Theater
1969	The Three Sisters	Masha	Anta Theatre, Broadway
1971	The Selling of the President	Irene Jantzen	Geary Theatre
1971	Antony and Cleopatra	Cleopatra	San Diego National Shakespeare Festival
1972	Private Lives	Amanda Prynne	American Conservatory Theater
1980	After the Season	Anne Stewart	Emerson Colonial Theatre
1981	Mary Stuart	Queen Elizabeth I	Ahmanson Theatre
1983	Actors and Actresses	Cara Heywood	Hartman Theatre Company
1985	The Loves of Anatol	Gabrielle/Ilona	Circle in the Square Theatre, Broadway
1986	Picnic	Rosemary Sidney	Ahmanson Theatre
1993	The Sisters Rosensweig	Sarah Goode (Replacement)	Ethel Barrymore Theatre, Broadway
1996	The Ride Down Mount Morgan	Theodora	Williamstown Theatre Festival
1996	Three Tall Women	B	National Tour
1999	What the Butler Saw	Mrs. Prentice	A Noise Within
2000	The Best Man	Alice Russell	Virginia Theatre, Broadway
2000	Ancestral Voices	Performer	George Street Playhouse
2001	Looking for Normal	Grandmother Ruth	Geffen Playhouse
2002	All Over	The Mistress	Gramercy Theatre Off-Broadway
2003	Elizabeth the Queen	Elizabeth	Folger Theatre
2005	A Body of Water	Avis	Guthrie Theater
2006	On Golden Pond	Ethel Thayer	National Tour
2008	Driving Miss Daisy	Daisy Werthan	Innovation Theatre Works
2010	Steel Magnolias	Ouiser Boudreaux	Welk Resorts Theatre
2011	Southern Comforts	Amanda Cross	International City Theatre
2011	Ghosts	Mrs. Helen Alving	Ensemble Theatre Company
2012	The Outgoing Tide	Peg	Delaware Theatre Company
2013	Driving Miss Daisy	Daisy Werthan	Judson Theatre Company
2014	Love Letters	Melissa Gardener	Delaware Theatre Company
2015	Mothers and Sons	Katharine Gerard	Philadelphia Theatre Company
2016	The City of Conversation	Carolyn Mallonee	Wallis Annenberg Center for the Performing Arts
2019	The Last Romance	Carol Reynolds	New Theatre Restaurant
