= Nursing pillow =

Cushion for ease of nursing and breastfeeding

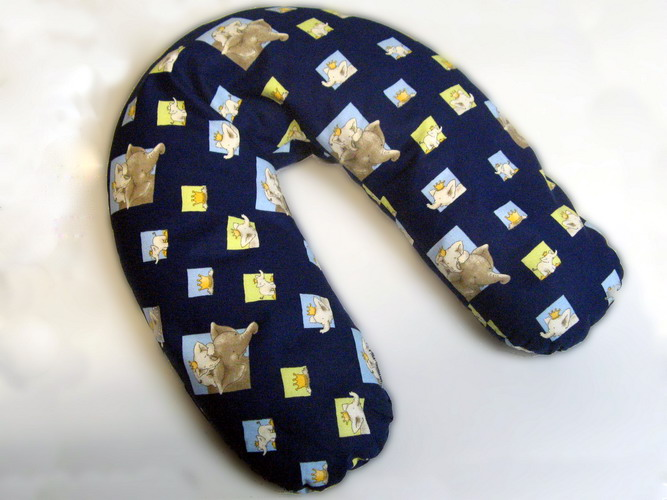

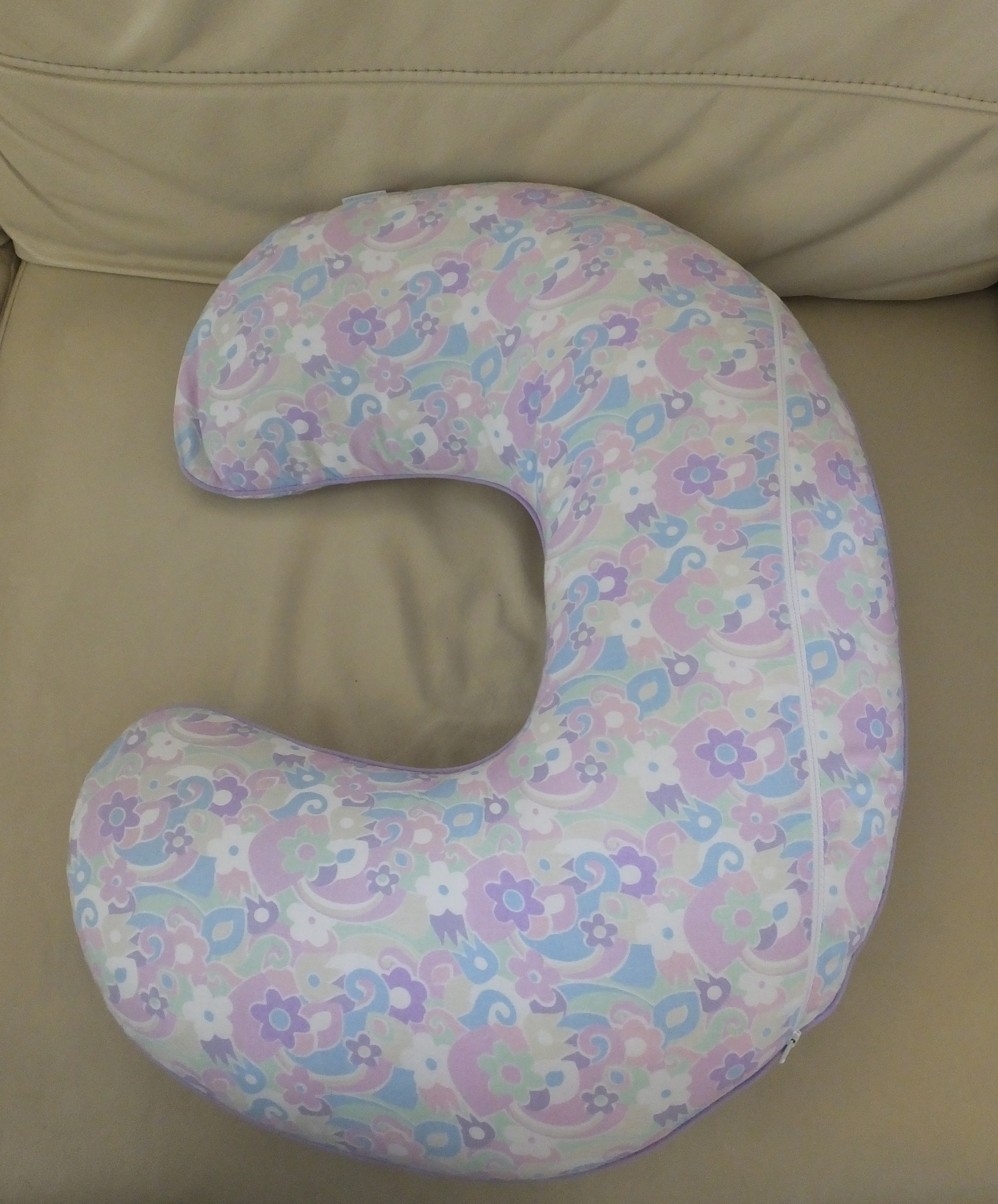
- 2 images of nursing pillows.

A nursing pillow is a cushion used to rest a baby, primarily to ease nursing and breastfeeding. It can make feeding more comfortable.
