= Nurse (band) =

American rock band

- Genres: Progressive rock, alternative rock
- Years active: 2004–present
- Members: Jake; Jonathan; Houston; Drew

Nurse is a progressive/alternative rock band, originally coming together in Fort Wayne, Indiana in 2004. The band formed when the remnants of the defunct progressive rock band Sonorus asked the singer of the dissolving rock band Seraphim to sing for them. They released their first album Walking Past in 2004.

== History ==
The band entered its first decade with the single Revolver in 2004, which, unreleased, didn't chart.

In 2005, guitarist Jake McGrew released his eponymous solo album, Return of the Mountain King, which also did not chart.

In the fall of 2005 the band went on their first independent tour. They traveled across the east coast, playing in Cincinnati, Dayton, Buffalo, Ithaca, New York City, Philadelphia, Washington D.C., and Atlanta. The band's second album Venti Varietatis was released on September 28, 2006.

== Discography ==
Studio

- Walking Past (2004):
  1. You Don't Know Alone
  2. Revolver
  3. From the Crowd
  4. Zero Is for Progress
  5. Apparent Spotless Heart
  6. Veil
  7. Amour Propre
  8. Years Will Be Lost
  9. Placebo
  10. Crispy Apple Lies
- Venti Varietatis (2006):
  1. Hibernacula
  2. A Horse, A Grudge
  3. Contusions in the Forehead
  4. Oh, the Things You Could Miss
  5. Doppelganger
  6. A Complex Embrace
  7. Ballad of the Blessed
  8. February 15
  9. Venti Rationis
  10. Garden of Muses

Compilations

- Hopeful Cat in a Dog's World (2005) Free Distribution
