= Mary Gaynor Nurse =

English nurse (1927–2004)

Mary Gaynor Nurse FRCN
- Born: 1927; Surrey
- Died: 2004 (aged 76–77); Surrey
- Occupation: Nurse tutor
- Employer: Royal College of Nursing

Mary Gaynor Nurse (1927–2004) FRCN, nurse tutor, recognised for her work in teaching and developing counselling and communication skills for nurses.

== Early life ==
Mary Gaynor Nurse was born in Surrey 16 April 1927. She trained as a nurse at the London Hospital between 1945 and 1948, registering as a nurse on 26 November 1948 (appearing as Mary Gaynor Nurse). In 1951 Nurse qualified as a midwife.

== Career ==
Nurse gained experience as a staff nurse, staff midwife, ward sister and night sister before undertaking work with the governments of Ghana and Cyprus under the aegis of the British Red Cross Society. On return to the UK, Nurse qualified and practiced as a health visitor. Nurse gained a Diploma of Nursing at the University of London later becoming a registered nurse tutor. In 1968 she joined the teaching staff of the Institute of Advanced Nursing Education at the Royal College of Nursing.

By 1975, Nurse had developed an interest in counselling and its place in nursing. She realised in a changing professional world there was a need for developing counselling processes. Her belief was that counselling could help the professional to resolve their own problems and those of clients. Her first publication, Counselling and the Nurse, appeared in 1975.

In 1976 Nurse was awarded the Leverhulme Fellowship by the National Florence Nightingale Memorial Committee, enabling her to study the teaching of professional nursing relationships as a component of nursing. In 1977 Gaynor was awarded an Associateship of the Institute of Education of London University after submitting a report entitled The Professional Helping Relationship and Its Relevance for Nurse Education. Nurse is cited as saying in context of a crash counselling course given to a multidisciplinary healthcare team that "the days when nurses were advised not to become emotionally involved with families are long past". By 1979 Nurse still noted that within nursing there was a lack of preparation for a counselling role and wrote of this in the nursing press drawing attention to multi-disciplinary courses available.

In 1980 Nurse was appointed as principal advisory tutor – special and short courses, within the Institute of Advanced Nursing Education. Nurse perceived the need for definition of terminology and demystification of concepts in relation to counselling and its place within nursing. She also attempted to analyse structure and benefits of an existing RCN counselling course. Nurse was a speaker and workshop leader on counselling courses run by the Royal College of Nursing.

== Publications ==
- Nurse, G. (1975). Counselling and the Nurse: An Introduction. 1st Ed., HM&M, Aylesbury, Bucks.
- Nurse, G. (1981). Counselling and the Nurse: An Introduction. 1988 2nd edition Chichester: Wiley 1988.
- Nurse G. (1977). The Professional Helping Relationship and Its Relevance for Nurse Education. London: The author

== Honours ==
In 1981 Gaynor Nurse was awarded the honour of fellow of the Royal College of Nursing (FRCN.)

== Death ==
Mary Gaynor Nurse died in 2004.
