= Nurse (American TV series) =

American medical drama television series

- Based on: Nurse by Peggy Anderson
- Developed by: Sue Grafton
- Starring: Michael Learned; Robert Reed; Hattie Winston; Bonnie Hellman
- Music by: Charles Gross
- Country of origin: United States
- Original language: English
- No. of seasons: 2
- No. of episodes: 25 (including pilot)

Production
- Producers: Robert Halmi Jr. Michael Rauch
- Running time: 60 minutes
- Production companies: Robert Halmi, Inc. Productions; Viacom Productions

Original release
- Network: CBS
- Release: April 2, 1981 – May 21, 1982

Nurse is an American medical drama television series that aired on CBS from April 2, 1981, to May 21, 1982. Series star Michael Learned won an Emmy Award for Outstanding Lead Actress in a Drama Series in 1982 for her role on the show. It was based on the bestselling book Nurse (1979) by Peggy Anderson.

== Synopsis ==
The series follows Mary Benjamin, the supervising nurse at Grant Memorial Hospital in New York City who returned to work after the death of her physician husband.

== Cast ==
- Michael Learned as Nurse Mary Benjamin
- Robert Reed as Dr. Adam Rose
- Hattie Winston as Nurse Toni Gilette
- Bonnie Hellman as Nurse Penny Brooks
- Hortensia Colorado as Nurse Betty LaSada
- Dennis Boutsikaris as Joe Calvo
- Clarice Taylor as Nurse Baily
- Christopher Marcantel as Chip Benjamin
- Rex Robbins as Dr. Greg Manning

== Episodes ==
=== Pilot (1980) ===
Title	Directed by	Written by	Original release date
Nurse	David Lowell Rich	Sue Grafton	April 9, 1980
Mary Benjamin is a widowed nurse who, after her son leaves home for college, decides to resume her career as head nurse at Grant Memorial Hospital in New York City.

=== Season 1 (1981) ===
No. overall	No. in season	Title	Directed by	Written by	Original release date
1	1	"A Little Rain"	James Sheldon	Story by : Chris Abbott; Teleplay by : Chris Abbott & Max McClellan	April 2, 1981
A friend of Mary's son may be supplying him with diet pills; hospital routines are interrupted by two disagreeable persons.
2	2	"The Gifts"	Virgil W. Vogel	Story by : Tom Egan; Teleplay by : Tom Egan & Max McClellan	April 9, 1981
An anonymous person upsets Mary with sexually suggestive gifts that are delivered to her apartment; an anorexic patient (Theresa Saldana) continues to starve herself.
3	3	"Listen to Me"	James Sheldon	Story by : Michael McGreevey; Teleplay by : Michael McGreevey & Max McClellan	April 16, 1981
A deaf hospital employee (David Purdham) reacts in an unexpected manner to Mary's news that his hearing can be restored.
4	4	"Life Begins at Dinner"	Virgil W. Vogel	Virginia Aldridge	April 23, 1981
Mary faces the trauma of turning 40 and complications by the romantic attentions of a younger man, Dr. Benson (Peter Coffield).
5	5	"Long Day's Journey Into Morning"	Virgil W. Vogel	Tom Egan	April 30, 1981
A reporter doing a story on Grant Memorial Hospital shows up on the day Mary's department is in chaos.
6	6	"Best Friends"	James Sheldon	Story by : Noreen Stone; Teleplay by : William Parker & John Welden	May 7, 1981
Mary's close friend (Joan Copeland) is admitted to the hospital after a suicide attempt and then insinuates she once had an affair with Mary's late husband.

=== Season 2 (1981–82) ===
No. overall	No. in season	Title	Directed by	Written by	Original release date
7	1	"Margin for Error"	Gwen Arner	Rena Down	November 11, 1981
Mary battles a conspiracy of silence when one of her nurses is accused of giving a patient the wrong medication.
8	2	"My Life as a Woman"	Gwen Arner	Hindi Brooks	November 18, 1981
Mary is having symptoms and her long-time physician wants to schedule a hysterectomy which her colleagues feel may be unnecessary.
9	3	"Rivals"	Harry Harris	Fred Freiberger	December 2, 1981
A new nurse (Diane Venora) joins Mary's staff and Mary, for reasons unknown to herself, takes an instant dislike to the girl.
10	4	"Equal Opportunity"	Seymour Robbie	Ray Brenner	December 17, 1981
A male nurse (David Morse) is assigned to Mary's department and Dr. Rose tries to persuade an aging doctor to retire from surgery.
11	5	"Going Home"	Unknown	Camille Marchetta	December 24, 1981
Mary quits both her job and New York City after an argument with Dr. Rose, and tries to return to her life as a suburban housewife.
12	6	"A Question of Dignity"	Philip Leacock	Lionel E. Siegel	December 31, 1981
A woman, pregnant with her seventh child, accuses Mary of encouraging her to sign a sterilization consent form.
13	7	"To Life"	Philip Leacock	Rena Down	January 7, 1982
Mary falls deeply in love with an art history instructor, then learns that he is terminally ill.
14	8	"The Store"	Seymour Robbie	George Bellak	January 14, 1982
A prostitute with a heart-valve infection checks into the hospital, and she later disappears with her pimp.
15	9	"A Place to Die"	Philip Leacock	Joel Steiger	January 21, 1982
An aging and terminally ill social activist (James Cromwell) insists on dying at home instead of in a hospital.
16	10	"A Matter of Privacy"	Unknown	Brad Radnitz	January 28, 1982
Mary reconsiders her role in the cover-up shooting of a congressman involved in a love triangle.
17	11	"Hands of Gold"	Unknown	Joyce Perry	February 11, 1982
Drugs are found to be missing from the medical room in Mary's department.
18	12	"Blackout"	Unknown	Norman Katkov	February 18, 1982
During a city-wide blackout, Mary tries to calm patients, Calvo organizes a neighborhood patrol and Toni delivers a baby.
19	13	"Where's Mary?"	Unknown	Philip Rosenberg	March 4, 1982
Mary is taken hostage during a bank robbery and tries to persuade her captors to let a wounded guard be treated.
20	14	"On the Line"	Unknown	Philip Rosenberg	March 11, 1982
Mary is torn between the needs of her patients and the cause of her nurses when the nurses go on strike.
21	15	"Father"	Alex March	Allan Leicht	April 23, 1982
Mary is worried when her perfectionist physician father (E.G. Marshall) comes for a visit and tries to repair their strained relationship.
22	16	"The Clown Prince is Indisposed"	Tony Mordente	Unknown	April 30, 1982
A boisterous, self-centered talk show host (Steve Allen) and his entourage turn his hospital room into a private office – complete with piano.
23	17	"Fevers"	Unknown	Stuart Rosenberg	May 7, 1982
A new inexperienced nurse suffering from job burnout takes the law and the life of a patient into her own hands.
24	18	"A Necessary End"	Bernard L. Kowalski	Unknown	May 14, 1982
The question of euthanasia is raised in the story of a dying woman suffering great pain.
25	19	"Impressions"	Unknown	Jerome Coopersmith	May 21, 1982
A surgeon (John Rothman), who has allowed his gambling debts and reckless investments get out of hand, finds his competence questioned following a post-operative death. This episode was delayed for a few hours in Boston, Massachusetts on the last day of broadcasting for WNAC-TV
