= Jurmo =

Island and village in Finland

Coordinates: 59°49.5′N 21°36′E

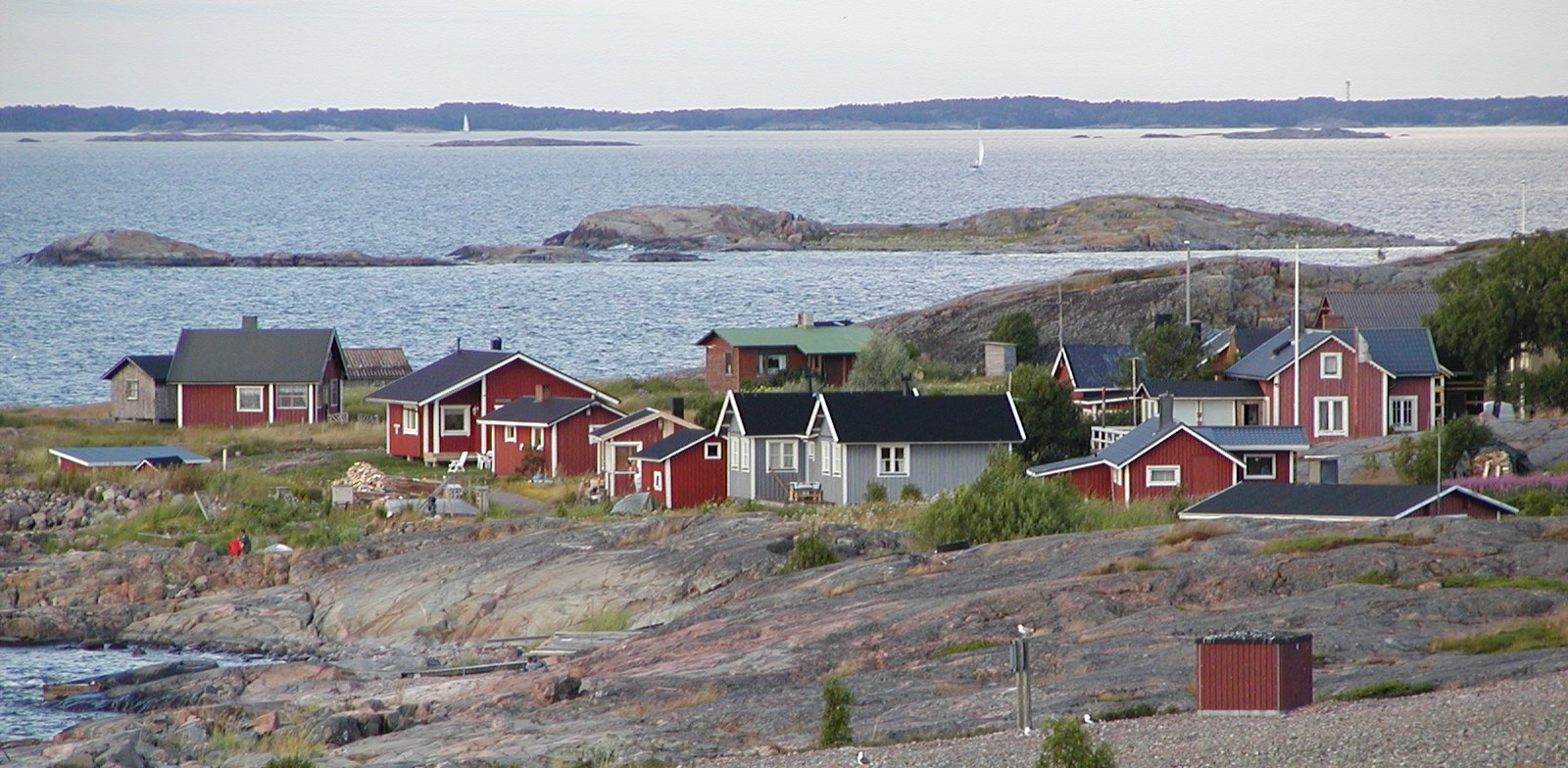
A fishing village on Jurmo

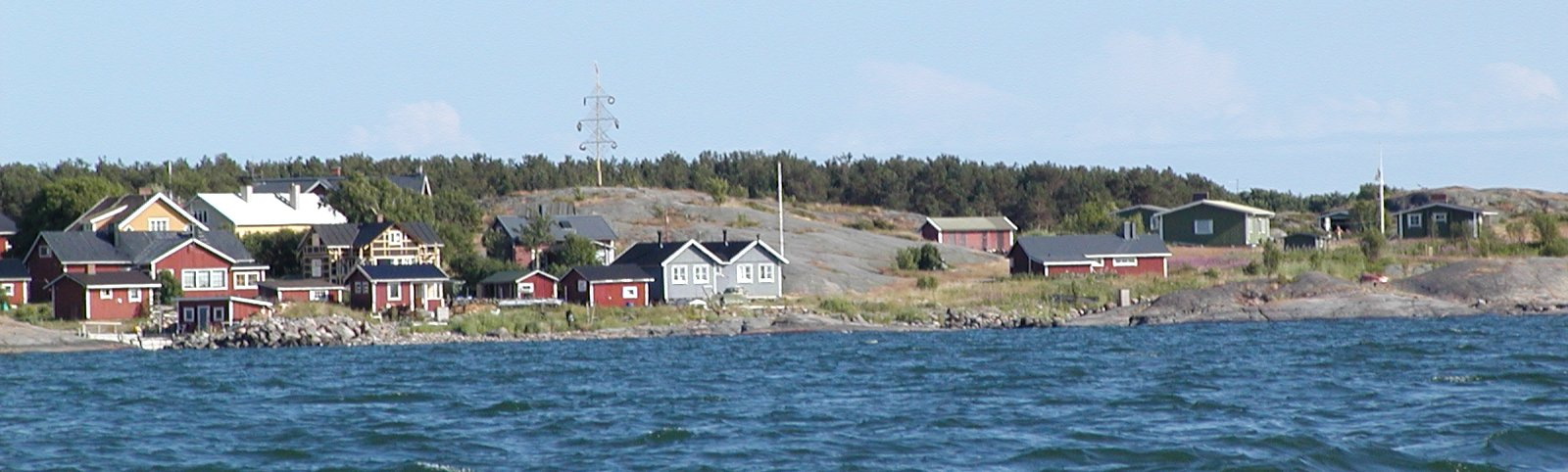
The northern shore of Jurmo.

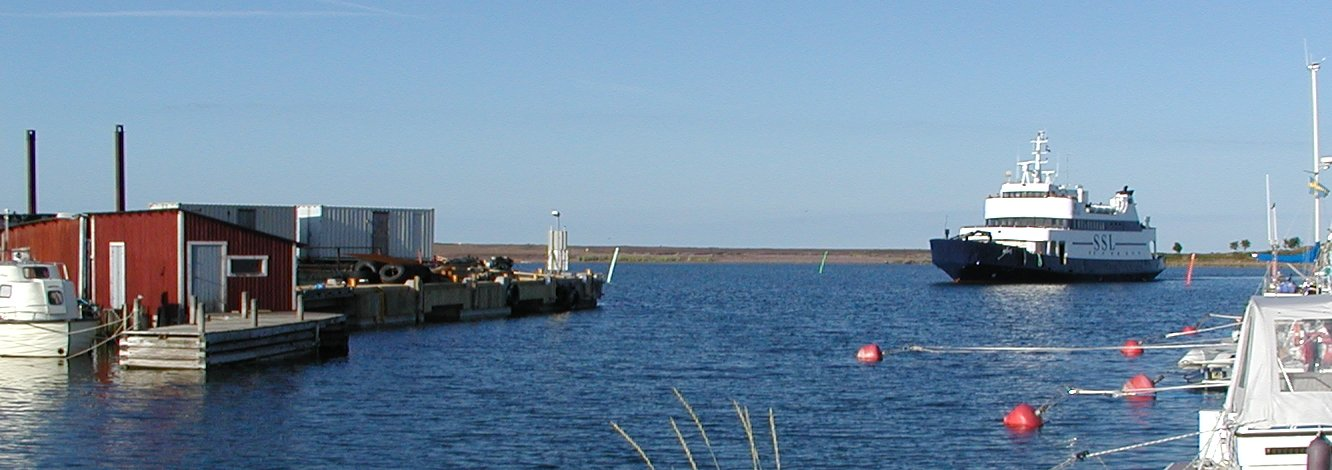
The M/S Aspö approaching the island of Jurmo.

Jurmo is an island and a village in the municipality of Pargas in the outer islands of the archipelago off of Turku, Finland. Directly south of the island of Korpo and 13 kilometres (8.1 mi) northeast of the island of Utö, this elongated island is 5 km (3 mi) in length with an average width of 1 km (0.6 mi). The island has had its own church since 1846 and a bird observatory. Although there are dozen or so permanent residents on the island, they are joined by quite a few part-time residents come summertime.

The island of Jurmo was formed during the ice age and, as an island surrounded by large amounts of gravel, and not consisting of only rock like most other islands in the region, is actually a distant continuation of the Third Salpausselkä.
