= Lost artworks =

Piece of art that once existed

Lost artworks are original pieces of art that credible sources or material evidence indicate once existed but that cannot be accounted for in museums or private collections, as well as works known to have been destroyed deliberately or accidentally or neglected through ignorance and lack of connoisseurship.

== Research and recovery efforts ==
Missing works with the highest estimated market values

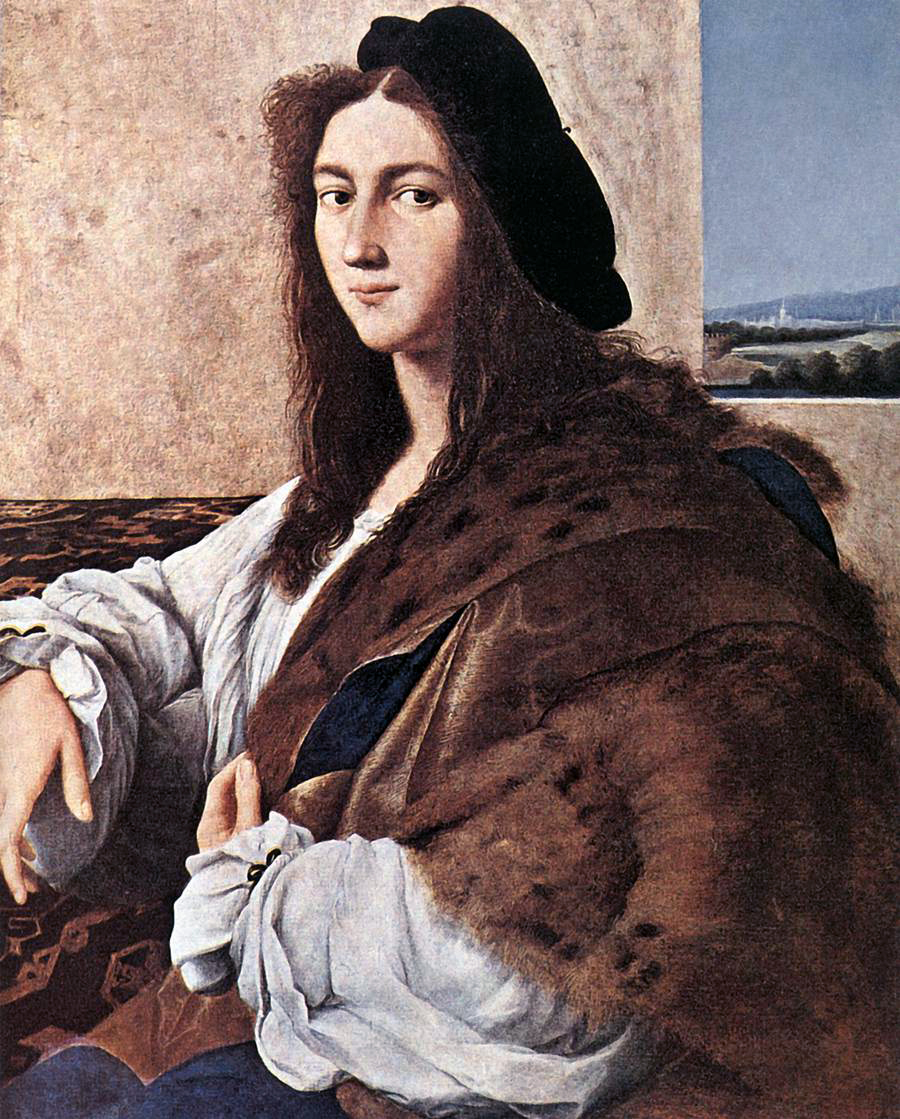
Portrait of a Young Man by Raphael

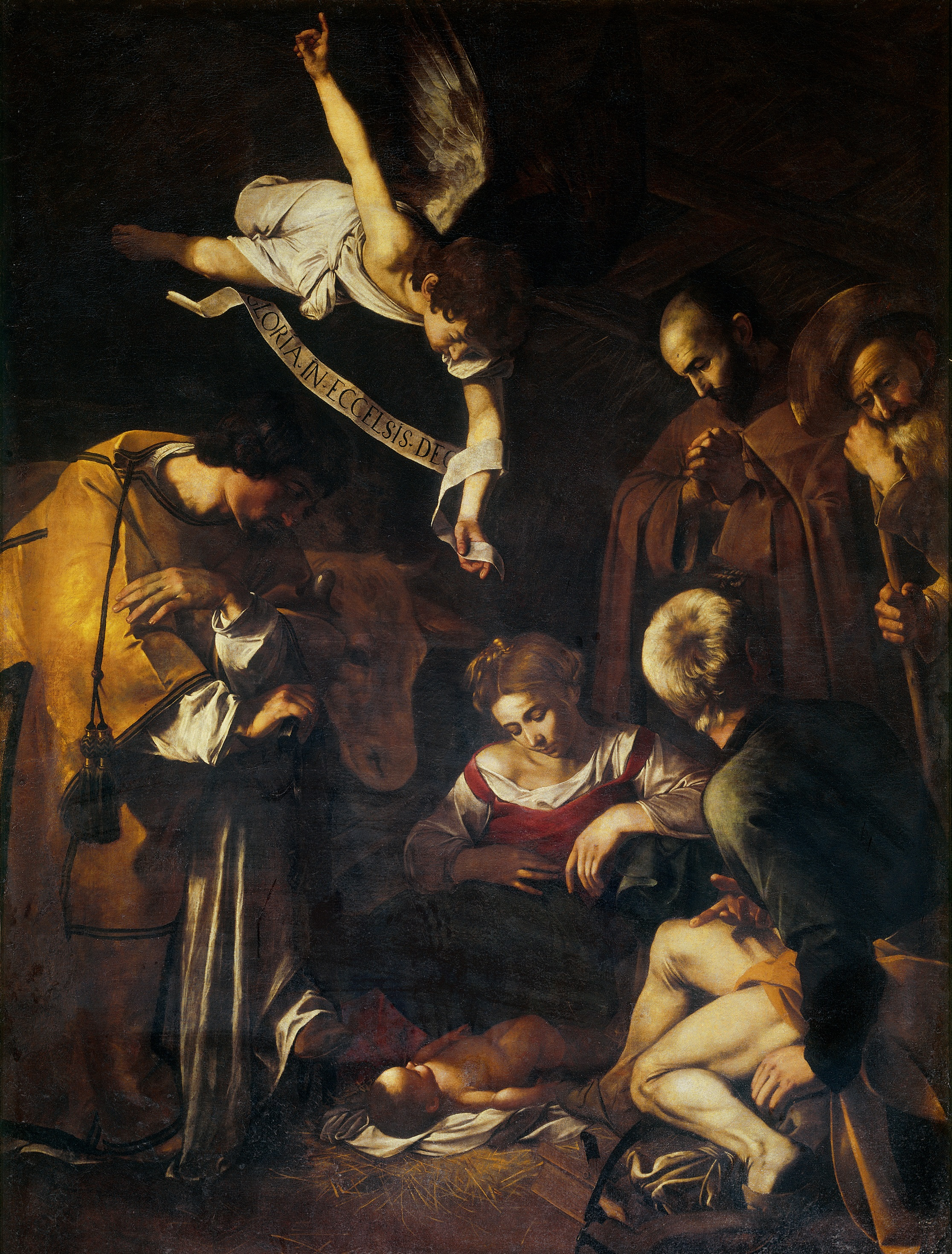
Nativity with San Lorenzo and San Francesco by Caravaggio Est. (2006) US$20,000,000

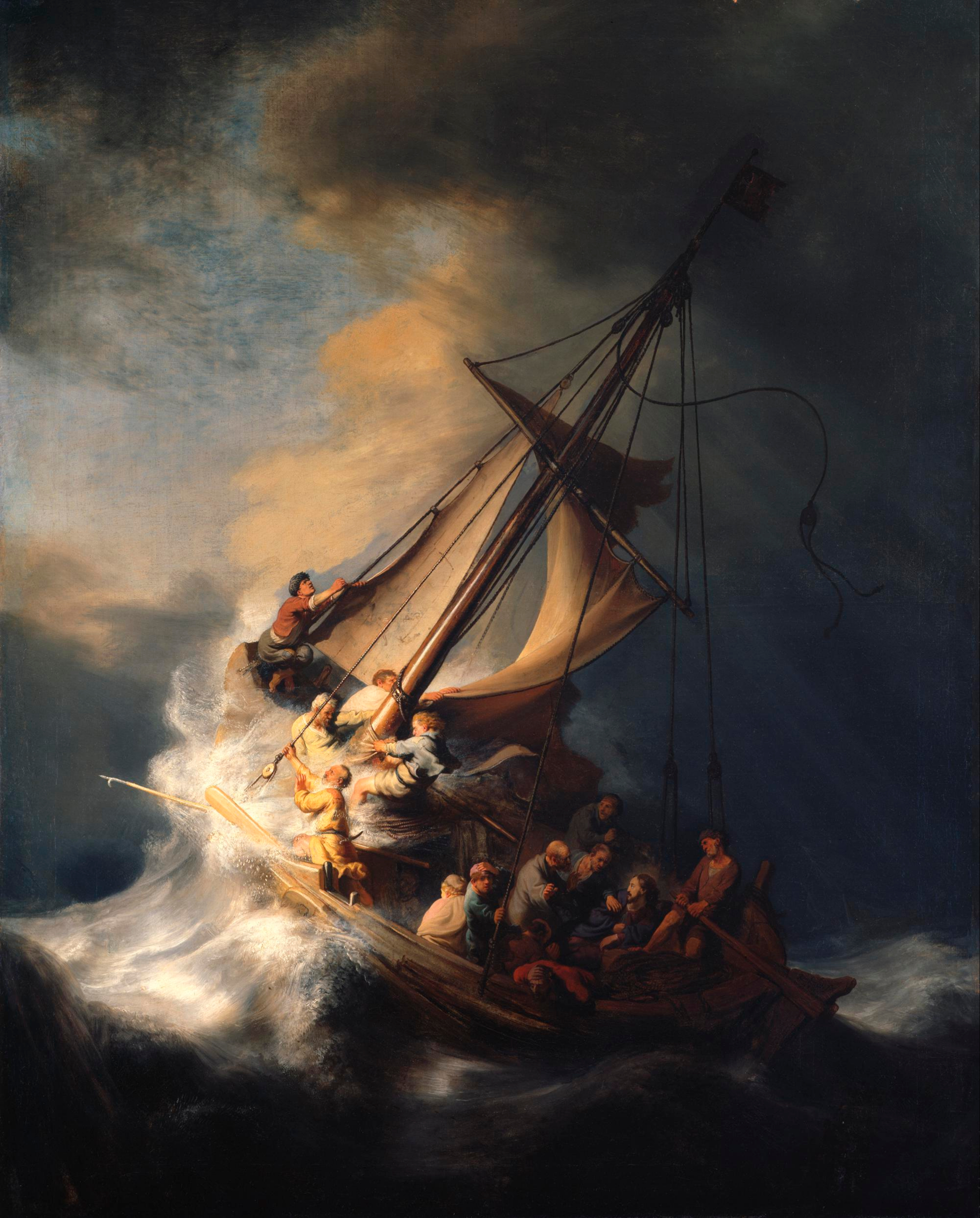
Storm on the Sea of Galilee by Rembrandt Est. (2006) priceless

Landscape with an Obelisk by Govert Flinck Est. (2006) priceless

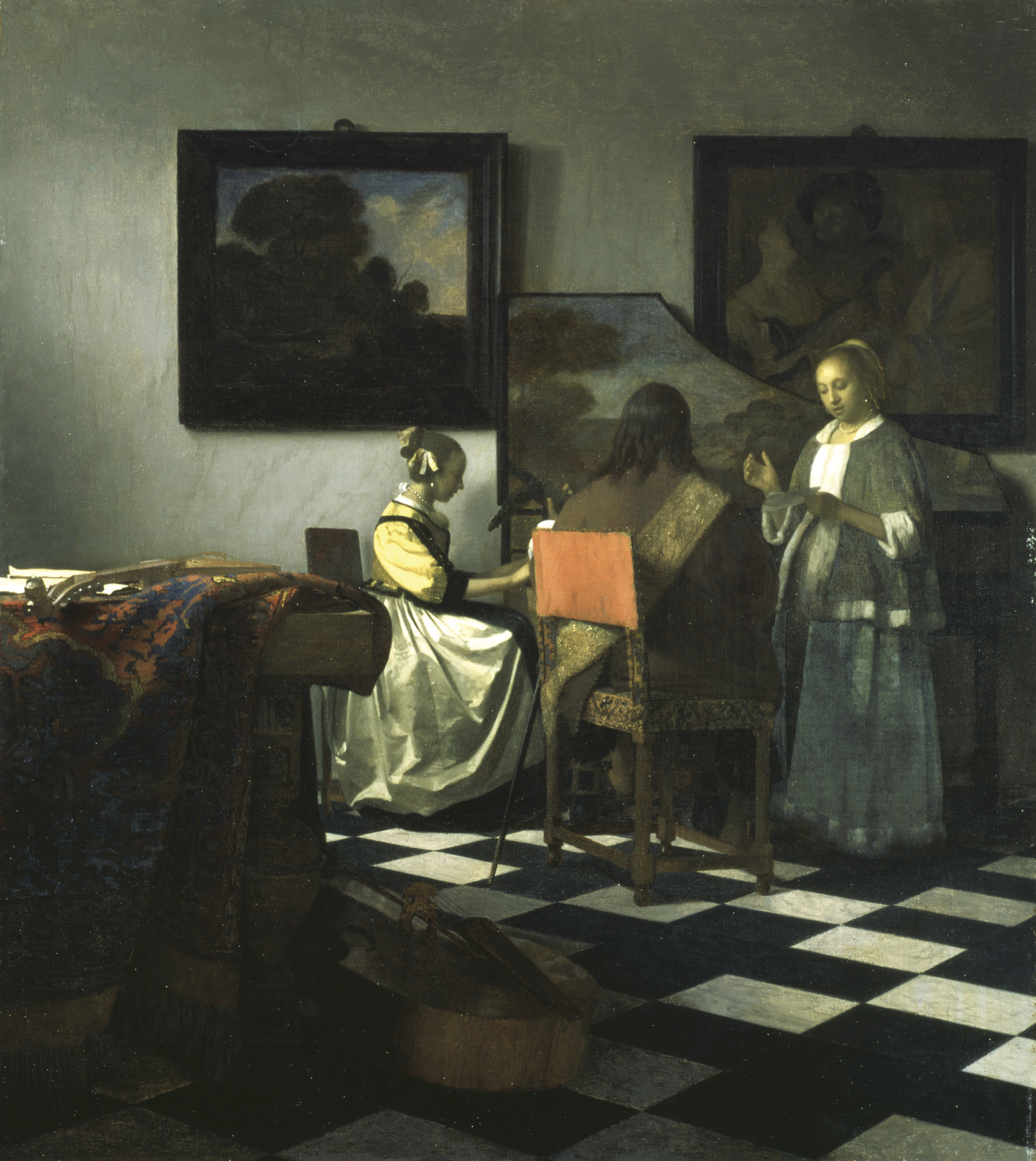
The Concert by Vermeer Est. $20,000,000–priceless

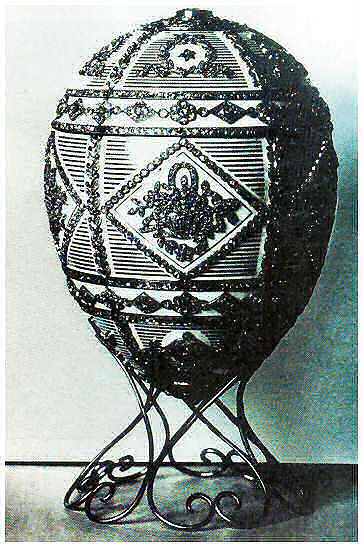
Alexander III Commemorative egg by Fabergé Est. $20–30,000,000

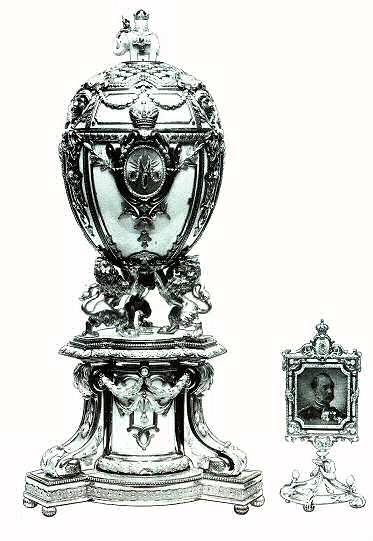
Royal Danish egg (Danish Jubilee egg) by Fabergé Est. $20–30,000,000

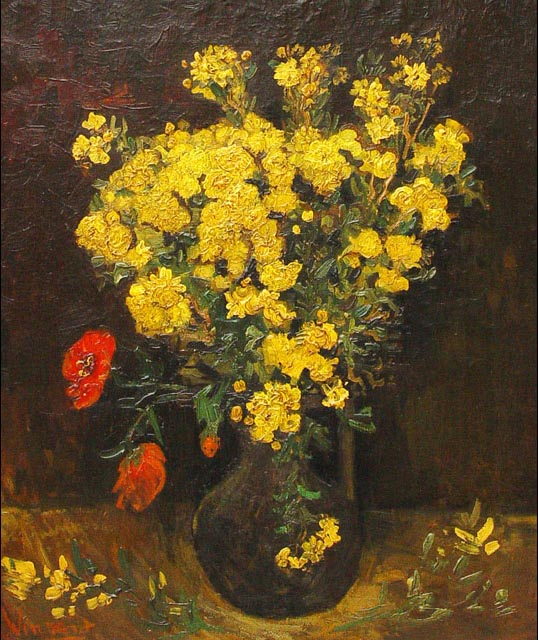
Vase with Lychnis by Van Gogh

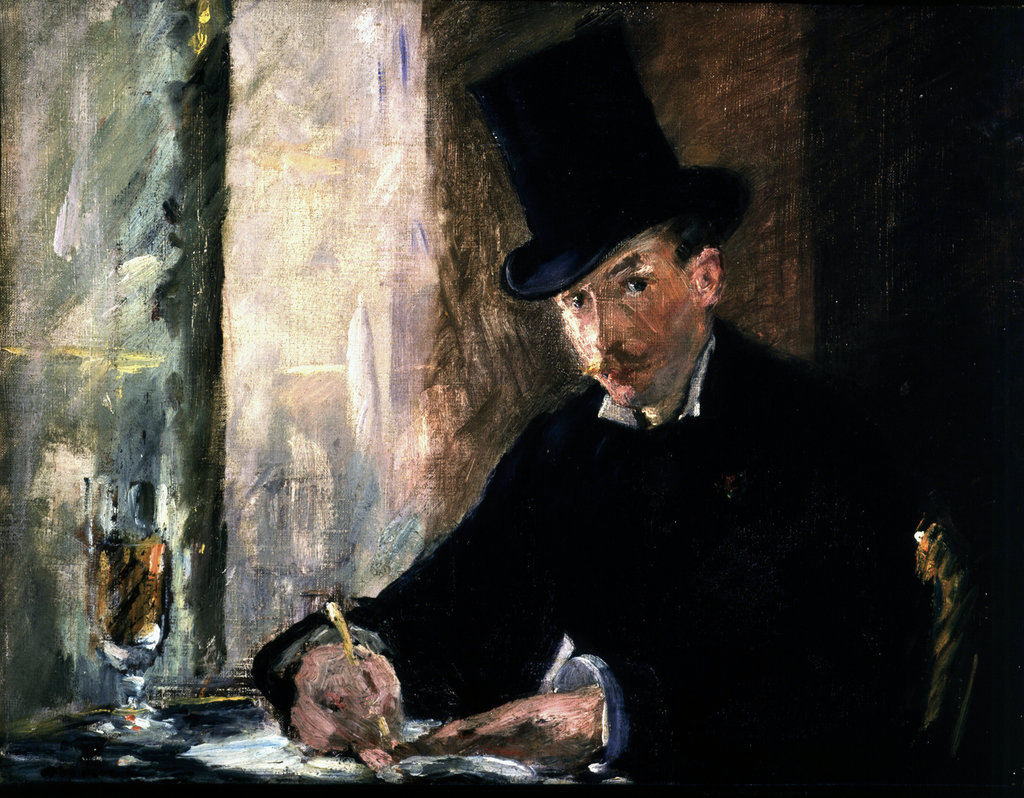
Chez Tortoni by Édouard Manet Est. (2006) priceless

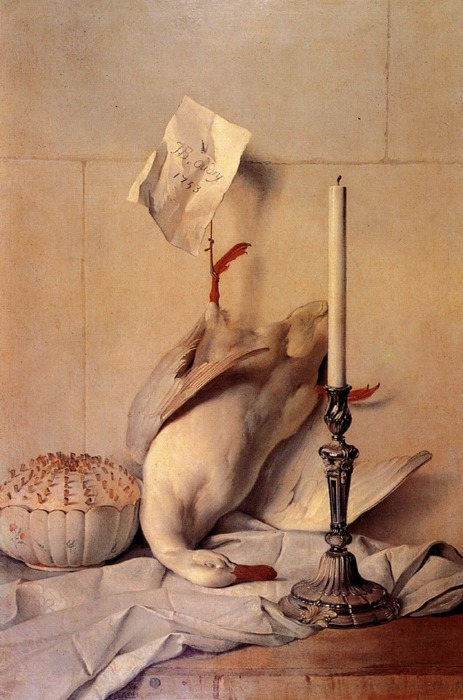
White Duck by Jean-Baptiste Oudry Est. (2006) US$8,800,000

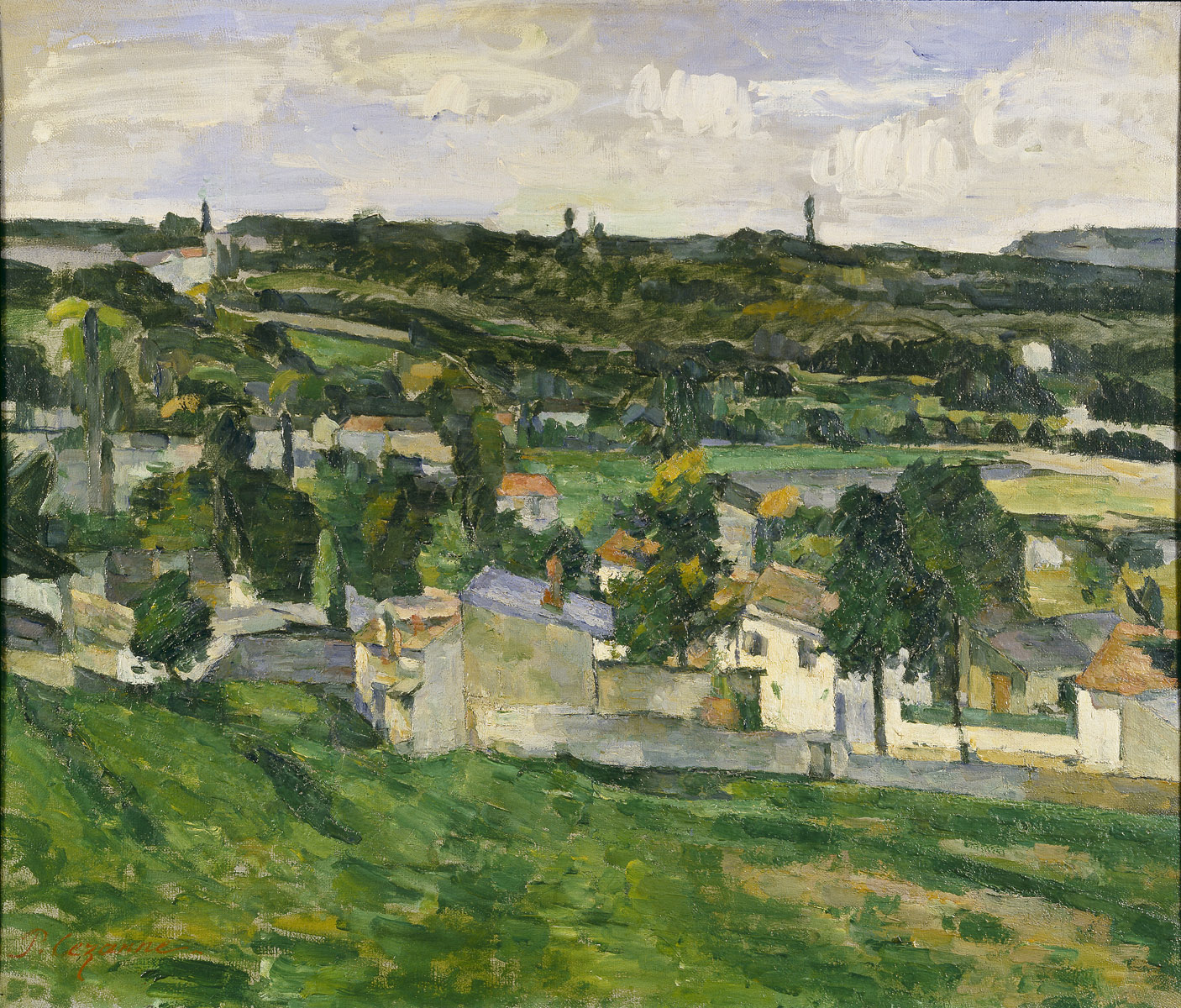
View of Auvers-sur-Oise by Cézanne Est. (2006) US$3,000,000

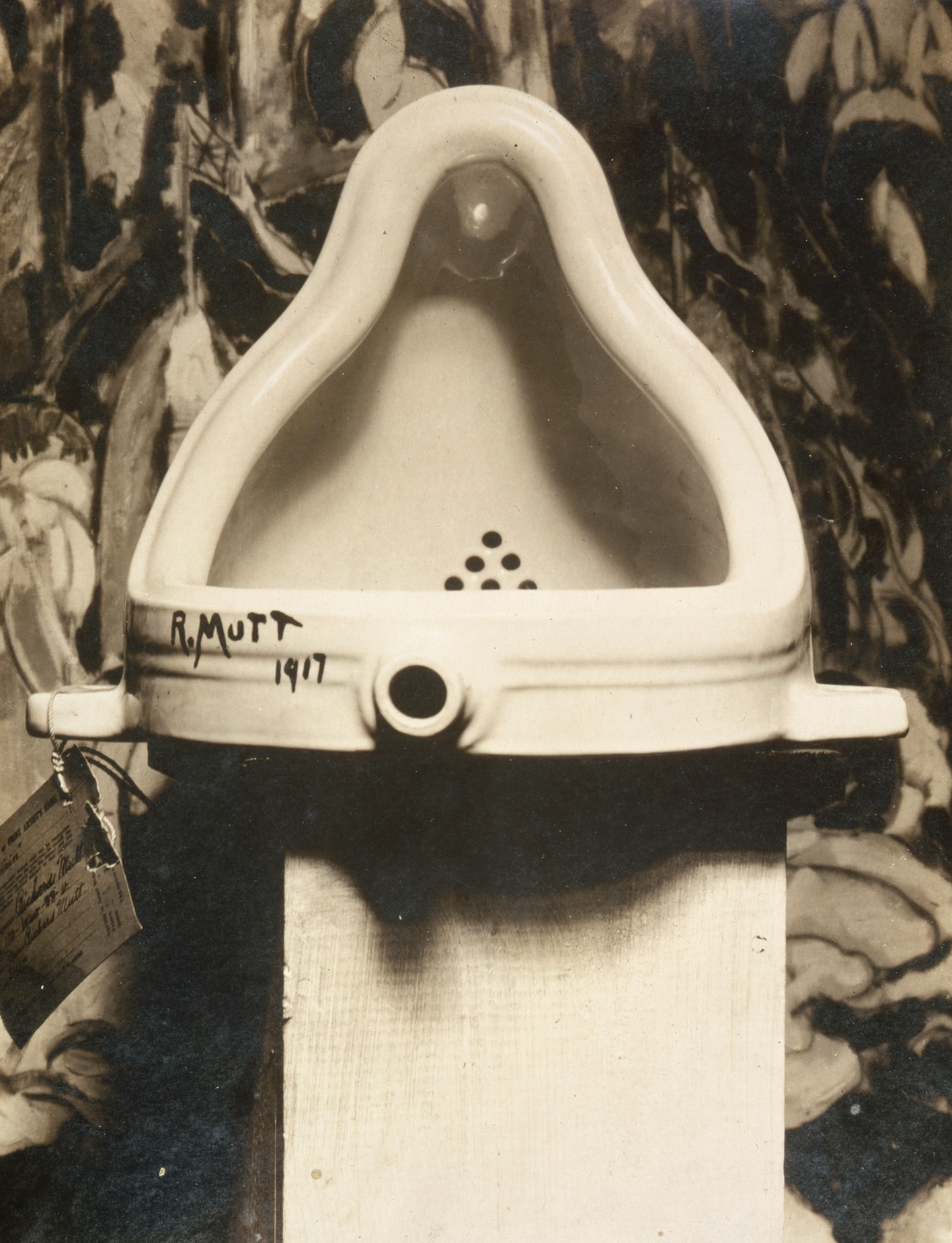
Original of Fountain by Marcel Duchamp (1917)

The Art Loss Register is a commercial computerized international database which captures information about lost and stolen art, antiques and collectables. It is operated by a commercial company based in London.

In the U.S., the FBI maintains the National Stolen Art File, "a database of stolen art and cultural property. Stolen objects are submitted for entry to the NSAF by law enforcement agencies in the U.S. and abroad."

A number of search and recovery efforts were created in response to major loss events, notably:

- Monuments, Fine Arts, and Archives program ("Monuments Men"), 1943–1946
- Bureau of Revindication and Damages (Poland), operated from 1945 to 1951
- Bureau of the Government Representative for Polish Cultural Heritage Abroad, 1991-

== Chronology of notable loss events ==
- Rhodes earthquake, 226 BCE
- First Mithridatic War, 89-85 BCE
  - Sack of Athens, 1 March 86 BCE
- Antikythera shipwreck, 86-50 BCE
- Great Fire of Rome, 64 CE
- Lauseion fire, 475
- Nika riots, 13 January 532-
- Byzantine Iconoclasm
  - Iconoclasm of Leo III, 726-741
  - Second Byzantine Iconoclasm, 814-842
- Jin–Song wars, 1125–1234
  - Jingkang Incident (Sack of Kaifeng), 10 January 1126-
- Fourth Crusade, 1202–1204
  - Sack of Constantinople, 12–15 April 1204
- Bonfire of the vanities, 1492–1497
  - Bonfire of the vanities, Florence, 1492
  - Bonfire of the vanities, Florence, 7 February 1497
- Palazzo Bentivoglio destruction, 1507
- Iconoclastic Fury, 1522–1599
  - Beeldenstorm, 1566
  - "Stille beeldenstorm" of Antwerp, 1581
- Doge's Palace fire, 1576
- El Pardo Palace fire, 1604
- Russo-Swedish Deluge 1648-1667
  - Destruction of the Commonwealth
- Bombardment of Brussels, 13–15 August 1695
  - Brussels Town Hall fire, 13–15 August 1695
- Palace of Whitehall fire, 4 January 1698
- André-Charles Boulle workshop fire, 30 August 1720
- Coudenberg Palace fire, 3 February 1731
- Royal Alcázar of Madrid fire, 24 December 1734
- Kroměříž Palace fire, March 1752
- Lisbon earthquake and tsunami, 1 November 1755
  - Ribeira Palace destruction
- Vrouw Maria sinking, 9 October 1771
- French Revolution, 1789–1799
- Napoleonic looting of art, 1794-1814
- Exton Old Park fire, 1810
- Belvoir Castle fire, 1816
- Basilica of San Paolo fuori le Mura fire, 1823
- Burning of Parliament, 16 October 1834
- Palais-Royal looting, 21–22 February 1848
- Old Summer Palace destruction, 18–21 October 1861
- Museum Boymans fire, 1864
- Paris Commune, 18 March-28 May 1871
  - Hôtel de Ville fire, May 1871
  - Tuileries Palace fire, 23 May 1871
- Holker Hall fire, 1871
- Great Boston Fire of 1872
- Bath House fire, 31 January 1873
- Pantechnicon warehouse fire, London, 13–14 February 1874
- Benin City sacking, 9 February 1897
- San Francisco Earthquake, April 18, 1906
- Messina Earthquake, 28 December 1908
- Mona Lisa theft and vandalism, 21 August 1911
- World War I, 28 July 1914 – 11 November 1918
- Russian Revolution and post-revolution losses, 1917-1920s
  - Treasures for Tractors, 1920s
- Thames flood (Tate Gallery flood), 7 January 1928
- Glaspalast fire, 6 June 1931
- Nazi plunder, 1933–1945
  - Berlin Fire Department art burning, 20 March 1939
  - Frey seizures (1939-1942)
  - Reichsleiter Rosenberg Taskforce seizures, 1940–1945
  - Mühlmann Agency seizures, 1939–1945
  - World War II looting of Poland, 1939–1945
- Ghent Altarpiece panels theft, 10 April 1934
- Spanish Civil War, 1936–1939
- World War II, 1 September 1939 – 2 September 1945
  - Gosford House fire, 1940
  - Castle Howard fire, 9 November 1940
  - The Blitz, 7 September 1940 – 21 May 1941
    - Bridgewater House bombing, 11 May 1941
  - Bombardment of Manila, December 1941
  - Bombing of Bremen, 1942
  - Palazzo Archinto (Milan) bombing, 1943
  - Battle of Monte Cassino, 17 January – 18 May 1944
  - Ovetari Chapel bombing, 11 March 1944
  - Destruction of Warsaw, 1944–45
    - Royal Castle, Warsaw explosion
  - Bombing of Dresden, February 1945
  - Battle of Manila, 3 February – 3 March 1945
  - Schloss Immendorf fire, May 1945
  - Friedrichshain flak tower fire, May 1945
  - Ashiya District air raids, 5–6 August 1945
  - Quedlinburg medieval art theft, 19 April – June 1945
  - Soviet looting, 1939–1945
- Kronberg Castle looting, 5 November 1945
- Arno Breker Sculpture Destruction, 1945-
- Arshile Gorky studio fire, 1946
- Alfred Stieglitz Gallery theft, 1946
- Musée de Beaux Arts de Strasbourg fire, 13 August 1947
- Coleshill House fire, 1952
- Museum of Modern Art (MoMA) fire, 15 August 1958
- American Airlines Flight 1 plane crash, 1962
- Dulwich College Picture Gallery theft, 30 December 1966
- Izmir Archaeology Museum theft, 24 July 1969
- Oratory of San Lorenzo theft, October 1969
- Stephen Hahn Gallery theft, 17 November 1969
- Montreal Museum of Fine Arts robbery, 4 September 1972
- Musée Albert-André, Bagnols-sur-Cèze, theft, 12 November 1972
- Invasion of Cyprus church thefts, 1974
- Russborough House art theft #1, 1974
- Palais des Papes Picasso theft, 31 January 1976
- Corridart installation destruction, Montreal, 1976
- Museum of Modern Art, Rio de Janeiro fire, 8 July 1978
- Varig plane disappearance, 30 January 1979
- L.A. Mayer Institute for Islamic Art theft, 15 April 1983
- Kunsthaus Zürich incendiary attack, 1985
- Huntington Library fire, 17 October 1985
- Musée Marmottan Monet theft, 28 October 1985
- Russborough House art theft #2, 1986
- Neue Nationalgalerie theft, 27 May 1988
- Isabella Stewart Gardner Museum theft, 18 March 1990
- Lincoln's Inn theft, 16 September 1990
- Houghton Hall theft, 30 September 1992
- Windsor Castle fire, 20 November 1992
- Uffizi car bombing, 1993
- Moderna Museet theft, 8 November 1993
- The Scream theft, 12 February 1994
- Kunsthalle Schirn theft (Frankfurt art theft), 28 July 1994
- Stéphane Breitwieser: 172 museum thefts, 1995–2001
- Galleria d'arte moderna Ricci Oddi theft, 18 February 1997
- Louvre theft, 3 May 1998
- Swissair Flight 111 plane crash, 2 September 1998
- Ashmolean Museum theft, 31 December 1999
- Nationalmuseum theft, 22 Dec 2000
- Russborough House art theft #3, 2001
- National Museum, Poznań theft, September 2000
- Caracas Museum of Contemporary Art theft, 2000–2002
- Taliban iconoclasm, March 2001
- Hermitage Museum theft, 22 March 2001
- September 11 attacks, 2001
- Marielle Schwengel's destruction of stolen art, November 2001
- Frans Hals Museum theft, 25 March 2002
- Edenhurst Gallery theft, 28 July 2002
- Russborough House art theft #4, September 2002
- Van Gogh Museum theft, 8 December 2002
- 2003 Iraq War
  - National Museum of Iraq thefts, 8–12 April 2003
- Kunsthistorisches Museum theft, 11 May 2003
- Drumlanrig Castle theft, 27 August 2003
- Momart fire, 24 May 2004
- Santo Spirito in Sassia Hospital theft, 31 July 2004
- Munch Museum theft, 22 August 2004
- Neumann Foundation theft, 27 October 2004
- Victoria & Albert Museum theft, 29 December 2004
- Westfries Museum theft, 9 January 2005
- Henry Moore Foundation theft, 15 December 2005
- Strindberg Museum theft, 15 February 2006
- Museu da Chácara do Céu, Rio de Janeiro theft, 24 February 2006
- São Paulo Museum of Art theft, 20 December 2007
- Foundation E.G. Bührle theft, 10 February 2008
- Pinacoteca do Estado de São Paulo theft, 12 June 2008
- Hélio Oiticica fire, 16 October 2009
- Musée d'Art Moderne de la Ville de Paris theft, 10 May 2010
- Dulwich Park theft, 20 December 2011
- Kunsthal Art theft, 16 October 2012
- Clandon House fire, 29 April 2015
- National Museum of Brazil fire, 2 September 2018
- Christ Church Picture Gallery theft, 14 March 2020
- 2022 Russian invasion of Ukraine
  - Ivankiv Historical and Local History Museum destruction, February 2022
- 2025 Louvre theft, 19 October 2025
- National Museum of Sudan destruction, June 2023 to March 2025

== List of notable missing artworks ==
This section lists articles or article sections on lost works.

Depictions of missing works

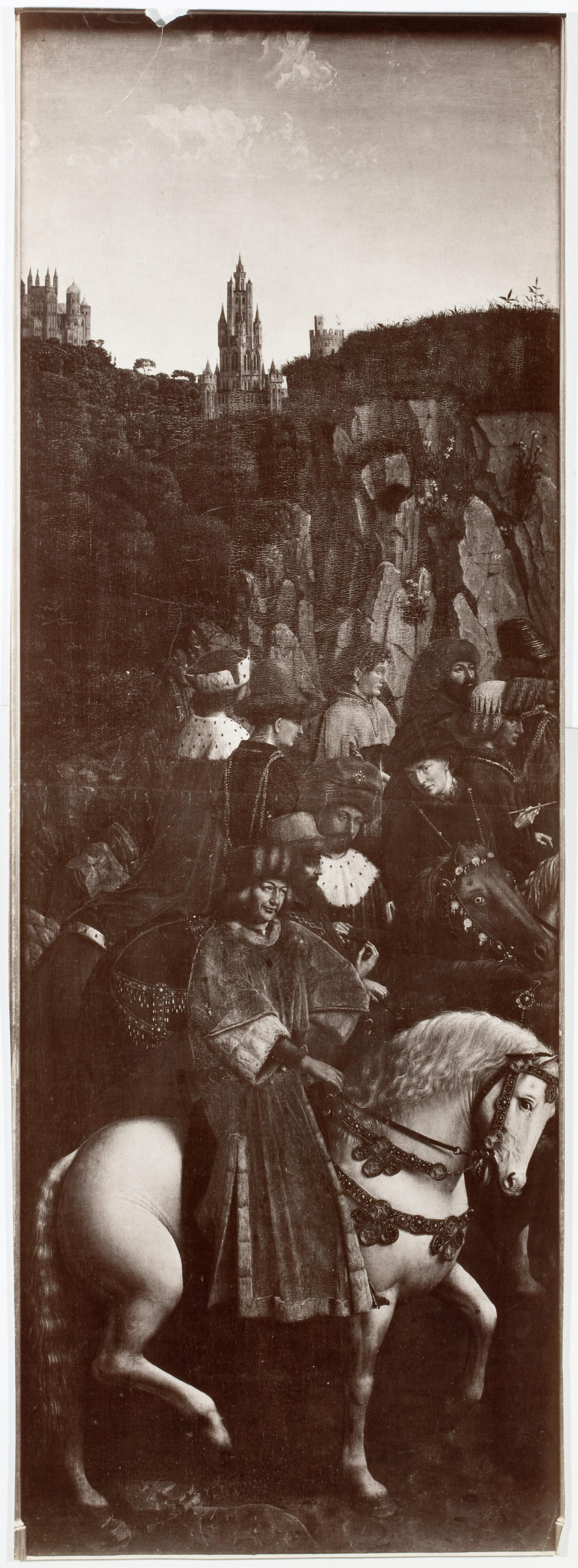
Just Judges from the Ghent Altarpiece

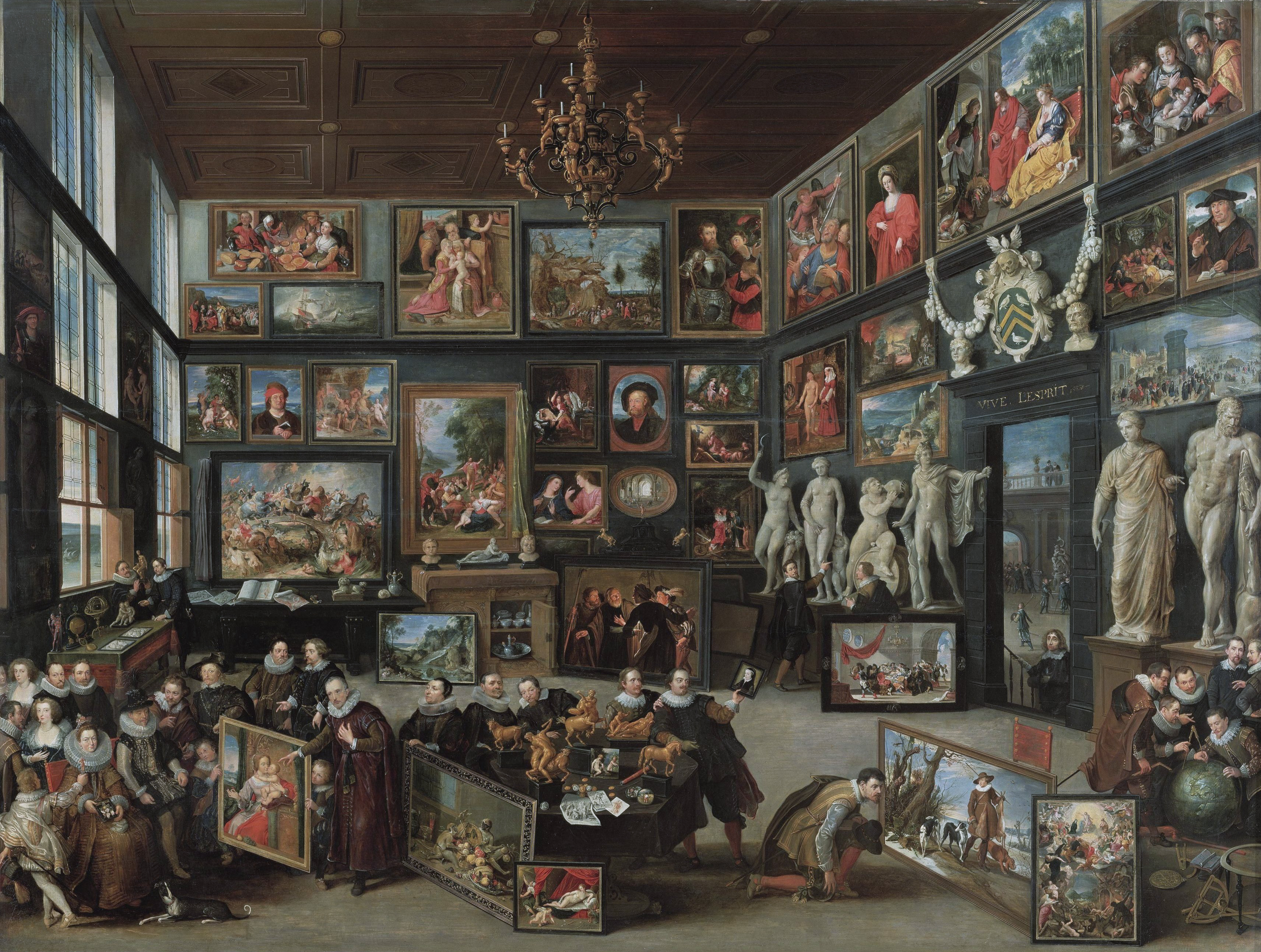
The Gallery of Cornelis van der Geest (1628), by Willem van Haecht, which includes the lost Van Eyck Woman Bathing as well as the lost Portrait of Albrecht Dürer in Black Hat and Cloak

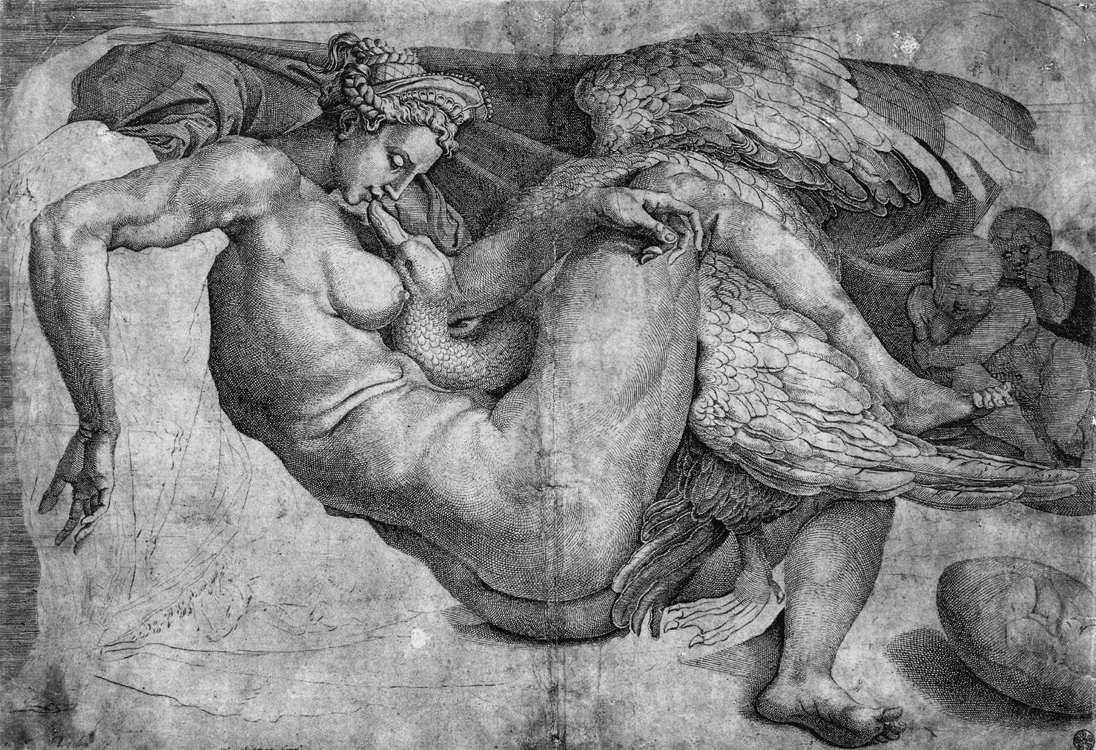
Cornelis Bos' engraving of Leda and the Swan by Michelangelo

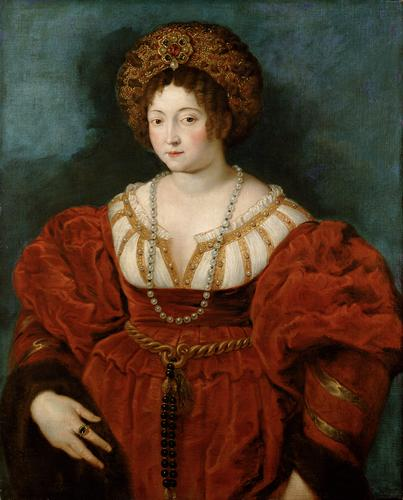
Rubens' copy of Titian's Isabella d'Este in Red

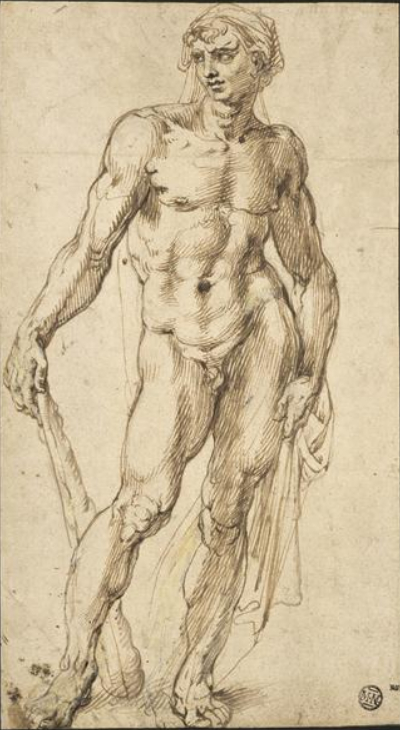
Rubens' sketch of Michelangelo's Hercules marble statue

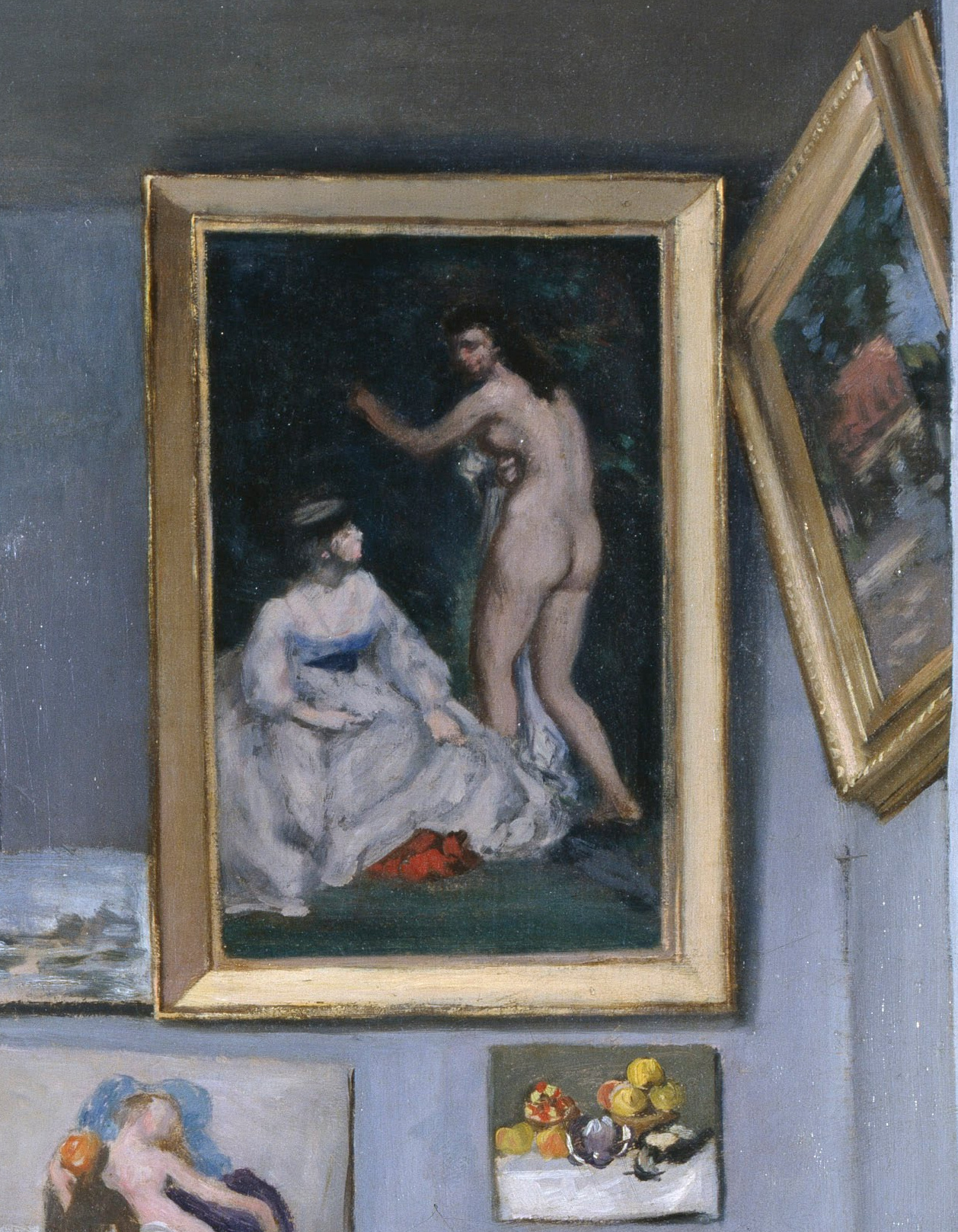
Renoir's Landscape with Two People as it appears in Bazille's Studio

List of notable missing artworks
Artist and work	Creation date(s) (est.)	Year lost (est.)	Loss event	Commission, provenance, documentation and surviving copies notes
Phidias Athena Parthenos	447 BCE	950		Originally in the Parthenon. Replicas and other works inspired by the original.
Lysippus Agias bronze	399-400 BCE			Marble copy found and preserved in Delphi
Lysippus Eros Stringing the Bow bronze	399-400 BCE			Various copies exist
Lysippus Alexander the Great bronzes	356-323 BCE			
Lysippus Oil Pourer bronze	340-330 BCE			Roman marble copies
Lysippus Hercules bronze	340-330 BCE			Marble copy by Glykon
Lysippus Apoxyomenos bronze	330 BCE			Multiple marble copies
Saint Luke Hodegetria	60-84 AD	1261		Many copies exist.
Giotto Madonna panel	1297-1337	1406-		Bequeathed by Petrarch to Francesca da Carrara, lord of Padua, in 1370
Scolland/Lanfranc (attrib.), embroiderers Bayeux Tapestry, portions	1070-1079	1137-(?)	Estate dispersal (Note: Possibly)	Possibly in possession of Adela of Normandy
Duccio Virgin of the Assumption	1308	1771	Dismantled	Panel of the Maestà altarpiece
Duccio Ascension of Christ	1308	1771	Dismantled	Panel of the Maestà altarpiece
Duccio Christ in Majesty	1308	1771	Dismantled	Panel of the Maestà altarpiece
Giotto Stories of the Apostles frescoes	1314-1328	1700-1799	Whitewashed	For the Giugni Chapel of the Basilica of Santa Croce, Florence
Martini, Simone Laura (Laura de Noves)	1327-1344			Portrait is the subject of Sonnets 77 and 78, Rime sparse (1372) by Petrarch
Giotto Commune of Florence allegorical fresco	1328-1337			Palazzo del Podestà. Vasari described a seated judge with sceptre, flanked by figures of Fortitude, Prudence, Justice and Temperance.
Van Eyck Woman Bathing	1420-1430	1628-		Depicted in Willem van Haecht's Gallery of Cornelis van der Geest; it or a copy was in Antwerp in 1628
Fra Angelico Painted Crucifix	1423			For the Dominican church of Santa Maria Novella, Florence
Van Eyck The Just Judges	1430-1432	1934	Ghent Altarpiece theft	Ghent Altarpiece panel. A photograph of the original and copies exist.
Grenier, Jean (produced through) Great History of Troy tapestries	1488	1829	Renovation sale	In the Painted Chamber from 1490 to 1799. John Carter produced watercolor sketches of the tapestries in the 1790s. In possession of Mr Teschemacher in 1829.
Lombardo, Tullio Eve	1490	1819		Lost when the Vendramin tomb was moved to Santi Giovanni e Paolo. (Note: Companion statue Adam survives.)
Giorgione The Birth of Paris	1492-1510	1650-		Copied by David Teniers the Younger. Fragment of two shepherds may survive at Museum of Fine Arts (Budapest).
Carpaccio The Trial of Saint Stephen	1511-1520	1806	Napoleonic looting	Scuola di San Stefano, Venice. (Note: One of a series of five canvases) A drawing for the modello survives in the Uffizi
da Vinci Medusa (unfinished)	<1500	1553-1599		Collection of Cosimo I
da Vinci Leda and the Swan	1508	1625-		Disappeared from Fontainebleau. Wilton House has a copy by Cesare da Sesto.
da Vinci The Battle of Anghiari	1505	1555-1572	Renovation	Palazzo Vecchio. Central section copied by Rubens
Correggio Albinea Madonna	1517-1519	1657-		Collection of Leopold I, Holy Roman Emperor
Michelangelo Leda and the Swan	1530			Gifted to Antonio Mini, taken to France then disappeared. Engraved by Cornelis Vos in 1537
Michelangelo Hercules marble	1492-1494	1713-1733	Renovation	Disappeared during the destruction of the Jardin de l'Etange at Fontainebleau.
Michelangelo David resting his foot on the severed head of Goliath bronze	1502-1508	1794-1795	French Revolution	Chateau de Villeroy (destroyed in the early 19th century)
Raphael Portrait of a Young Man	1513-1514	1939	Nazi plunder	
Raphael Saint Catherine of Alexandria		1655-	English Civil War / Estate dispersal	Collection of Thomas Howard, Earl of Arundel. Engraved by Wenceslas Hollar
Vincidor, Tommaso Portrait of Albrecht Dürer in Black Hat and Cloak	1520			Depicted in the 17th-century gallery of Cornelis van der Geest painted by Willem van Haecht
Cellini The Wedding of Neptune and Amphitrite silver bowl		1796	Napoleonic looting or reparations	Taken from the Chapter of the Basilica of Santa Barbara, Modena
Brueghel the Elder Market Day				Depicted in the 17th-century gallery of Cornelis van der Geest painted by Willem van Haecht
Titian Portrait of Isabella d'Este in Red	1524-1536	1640-	Estate dispersal	A copy by Rubens is in the Kunsthistorisches Museum, Vienna
Titian Venus in Front of her Mirror	1555-1576	1800-1899		Spanish royal collection. A copy by Rubens survives
Vasari or Bronzino Portrait of Bianca Cappello	1572-	1842	Estate dispersal	Purchased from Vitelli palace and gifted to Horace Walpole in 1754. Auctioned from Strawberry Hill House in 1842 (Lot 92, 20th day)
Carracci Christ head	1580-1609	1945	World War II	Gemäldegalerie Alte Meister in Dresden
Lorrain, Claude Aeneas and the Sibyl of Cumae	1666-1673			Collection of Prince Falconieri. (Note: One of four works commissioned) Liber Veritatis 183
Rubens Judith Beheading Holofernes	1609			Known only though the 1610 engraving by Cornelis Galle the Elder
Rubens Susannah and the Elders	1617-1618			Engraved 1620 by Lucas Vosterman
Rubens Satyr, Nymph, Putti and Leopards	1618			Now known only from engraving
Rubens Equestrian Portrait of the Archduke Albert				
Van Dyck Portrait of Jules Mazarin before his appointment as Cardinal	1641	1652	The Fronde	Sold by the Tribunal of Paris in early 1652
Poussin Women Bathing	1633-1634			Luigi Omodei (1607-1685) collection. (Note: One of two, the other was The Rape of the Sabine Women)
Rembrandt The Circumcision	1646	1700-1799		Collection of Frederick Henry, Prince of Orange. Herzog Anton Ulrich Museum has a presumptive copy.
Vermeer Gentleman washing his hands in a perspectival room with figures, artful and rare	1653-75	1696-		Last known at the Dissius auction, Holland, sold for 95 guilders
Gerard Dou The Nursery	1660s	1771	Vrouw Maria sinking	Acquired by Catherine the Great
Caravaggio A portrait of Alof de Wignacourt				
Caravaggio Nativity with St. Francis and St. Lawrence	1609	1969	Stolen	Oratory of San Lorenzo, Palermo
Velasquez The Jester Francesco de Ochoa	1633-1640	1701-		Queen's quarters, Buen Retiro Palace
Velasquez Cardenas the Toreador	1633-1640	1701-		Queen's quarters, Buen Retiro Palace
Velasquez Pelican with Bucket and Donkeys	1623-1635	1701-		Buen Retiro Palace
Reni, Guido Bacchus from Bacchus and Ariadne ceiling painting	1638-40	1650	Disassembled	Henrietta Maria of France then Michel Particelli d'Émery collection, cut to pieces for easier sale by his estate. Ariadne was rediscovered in 2002.
Oudry, Jean-Baptiste The White Duck	1753	1990	Houghton Hall theft	
Watteau Autumn	1717-1718	1820-		Pierre Crozat collection. Engraved in the Recueil Jullienne. (Note: Summer survives, Spring was destroyed, and Winter is also missing.)
Watteau Winter	1717-1718	1920-		Pierre Crozat collection. Engraved in the Recueil Jullienne. (Note: Summer survives, Spring was destroyed, and Autumn is also missing.)
Oudry, Jean-Baptiste Jay and Oriole Hung by the Feet				Exhibited at the Salon of 1751
Tiepolo, Gianbattista Mars Resting ceiling painting	1762-1768	1941	World War II	Rinaldi's Chinese palace, Oranienbaum. Sent to Pavlovsk for safety, vanished
West, Benjamin Reception of the American Loyalists by Great Britain in the Year 1783	1812			Long considered to have been lost until research published in 2025 concluded that it never existed as an independent painting, but was originally painted within the background West's portrait of John Eardley Wilmot.
David Louis-Michel le Peletier, marquis de Saint-Fargeau on his Death Bed	1793			Exhibited with David's Marat in the courtyard of the Louvre, 16 October 1793. An engraving by Anatole Desvoges exists
Blake A Vision of the Last Judgment	1808			Earlier versions and sketches survive, but the final version has not been seen since the cancellation of an 1810 exhibit it was to have been part of
Turner Aeneas Relating his Story to Dido	1850			
Banvard, John Mississippi River Panorama	1840-1846	1850-1899	Cut into pieces	
Renoir Summer Evening	1864	1865		Paris Salon
Renoir Landscape with two people	1866	1939-1945	Nazi Plunder and Soviet looting	Depicted in Bazille's Studio. Lower half survives as Woman with a Bird
Monet La Sortie du port	1867-1868			Studies and sketches survive as The Entrance to the Port of Le Havre (Norton Simon Museum).
Cézanne View of Auvers-sur-Oise	1873-1875	1999	Ashmolean Museum theft	
Bracquemond, Marie Les Muses des arts	1878	1919-		Last reported location was at the Philadelphia Museum of Art in 1919
Bracquemond, Marie The Swallow	1880			
Vereshchagin, Vasily Suppression of the Indian Revolt by the English	1884	1891-		Sold in New York to an unknown buyer
Hirémy-Hirschl, Adolf The Plague in Rome	1884			
Van Gogh The Lovers: The Poet's Garden IV	1888	1937	Nazi plunder	Declared degenerate and confiscated
Saint-Gaudens Diana bronze sculpture (first version)	1891-1892			Designed to crown the Madison Square Garden tower. Replaced by the artist with a lighter, smaller copper version
Cassatt Modern Woman tympanum mural	1892	1893-	Institutional neglect	Over Women's Building entrance, World's Columbian Exposition
Fabergé Hen with Sapphire Pendant	1886	1922	Russian Revolution	
Fabergé Cherub with Chariot	1888	1922	Russian Revolution	
Fabergé Necessaire egg	1889	1922	Russian Revolution	
Fabergé Mauve egg	1898	1922	Russian Revolution	
Jovanović, Paja Furor Teutonicus monumental painting	1899	1911-1939	Institutional neglect	Chilean National Museum of Fine Arts. Belgrade City Museum has a heliogravure copy and sketch in oils.
Felderhoff, Reinhold Amphitrite Fountain	1902	1932-	Disappeared from storage	Removed from public display
Fabergé Royal Danish Egg	1903	1922	Russian Revolution	
Fabergé Alexander III Commemorative Egg	1909	1922	Russian Revolution	
Metzinger, Jean Nu à la cheminée	1910			Black & white images survive
Metzinger, Jean Man with a Pipe	1911-1912	1998		Missing from Lawrence University since 1998, having disappeared while in transit on loan. Images survive
Gleizes, Albert Paysage près de Paris (Landschaft bei Paris)	1912	1937	Nazi plunder	Black & white image survive
Metzinger, Jean En Canot	1913	1938-	Nazi plunder	Displayed at the Degenerate Art Exhibition in Munich and other cities, 1937-1938, confiscated. Black & white images survive
Dix The Trench	1936	1937	Nazi Plunder	
Bacon Study after Velázquez III	1950-1953	1953-		Third in a series of portraits after Velázquez's Portrait of Pope Innocent X, 1650. (Note: Thought destroyed by the artist until 1999, when studies I and II resurfaced.)
Duchamp Fountain (Duchamp)	1917	1918		Black & white images survive, as do sixteen artist-sanctioned replicas
Kapoor, Anish Hole and Vessel wood and cement sculpture	1984	2004	Probably stolen	Discovered missing from its storage unit
Serra Equal-Parallel/Guernica-Bengasi a 38-ton metal sculpture	1986	2006	Possibly theft	Formerly displayed at the Reina Sofia museum. Could not be located in 2006

== Chronology of notable find events ==
- 2012 Discovery of the Gurlitt Collection

== List of Wikipedia articles on notable finds ==
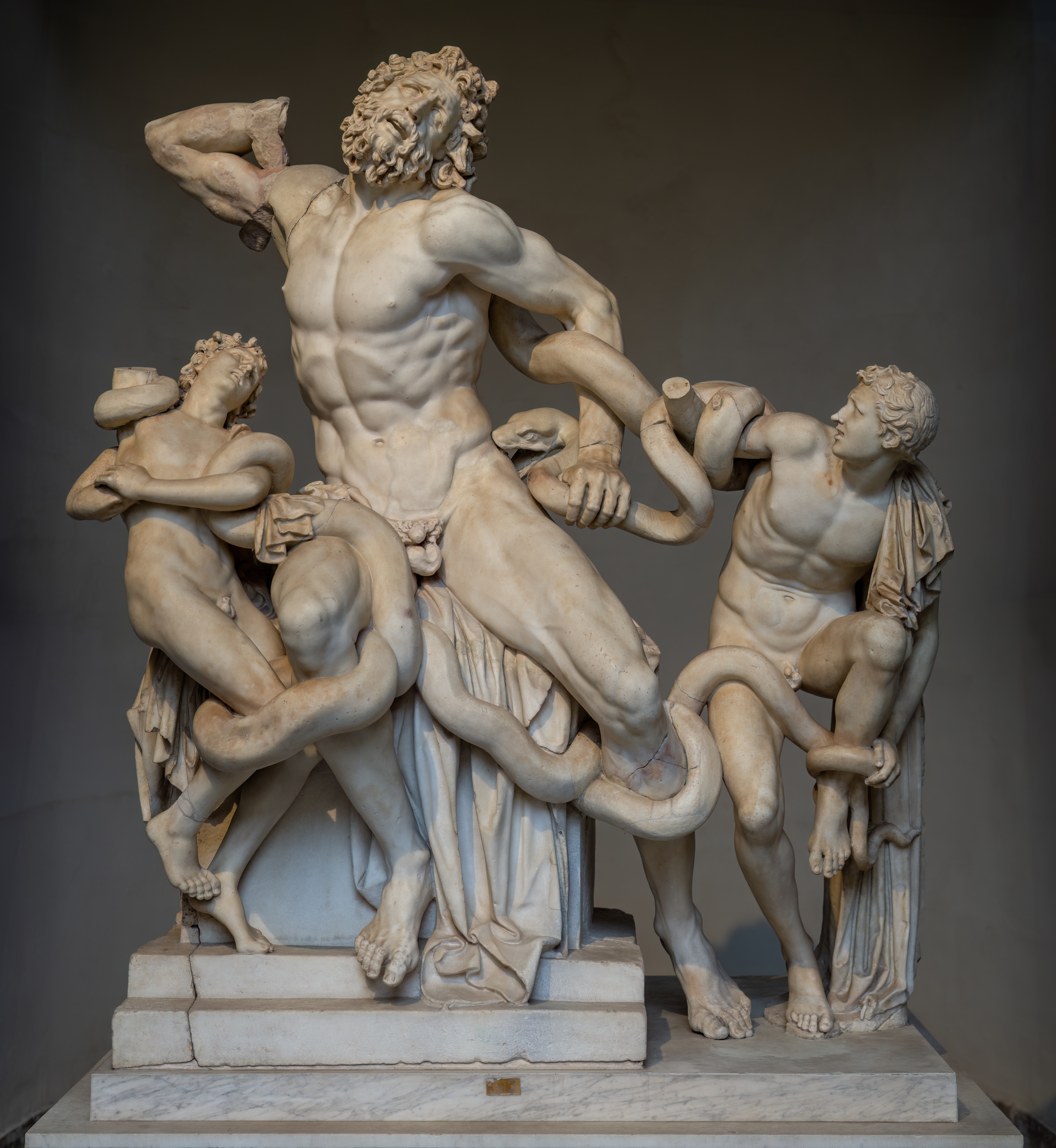
Laocoön and His Sons

The Mocking of Christ by Cimabue

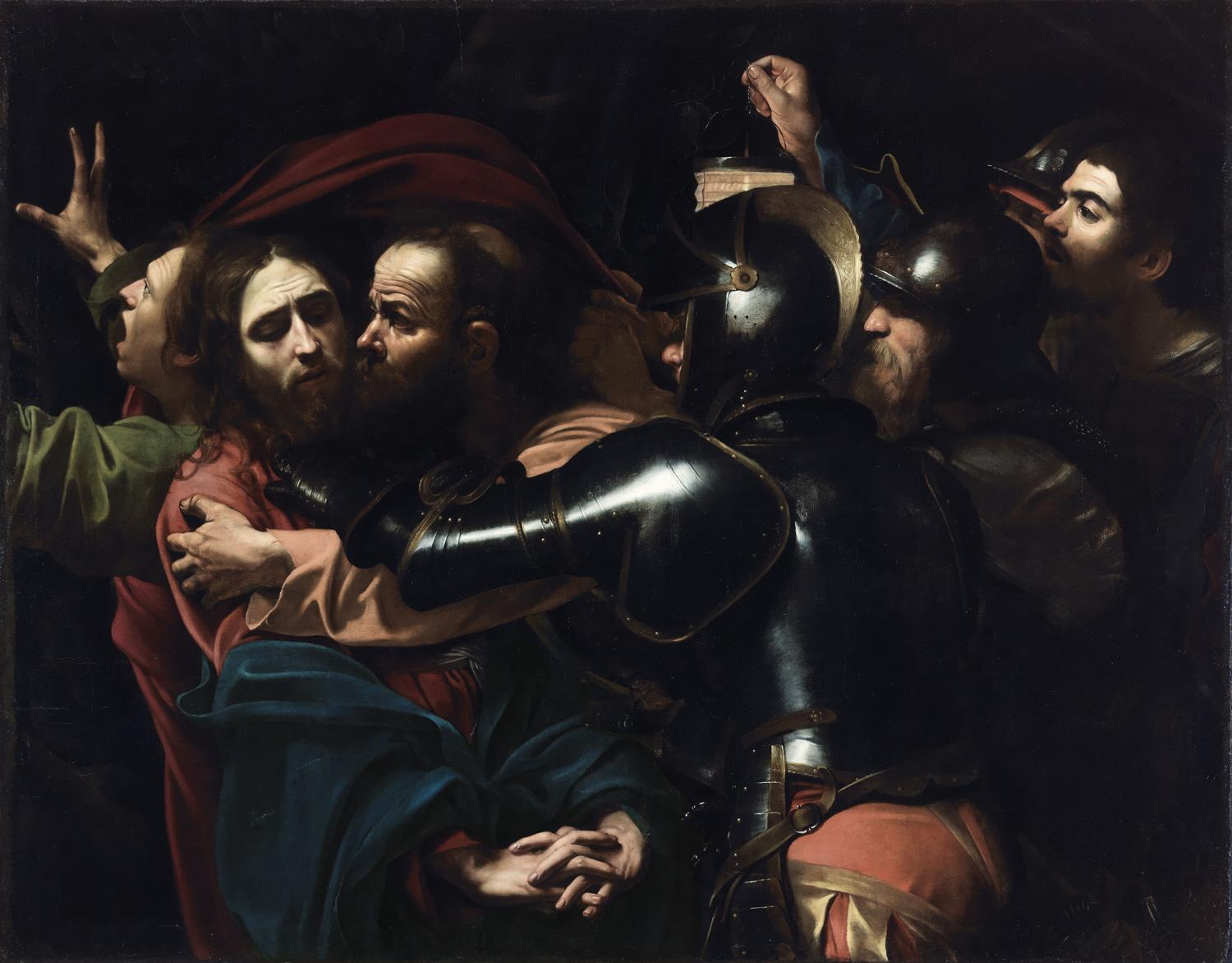
The Taking of Christ by Caravaggio

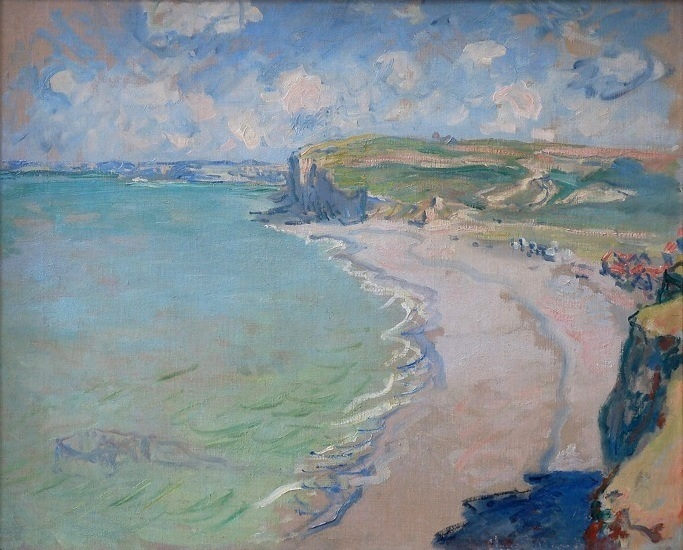
Beach in Pourville by Claude Monet

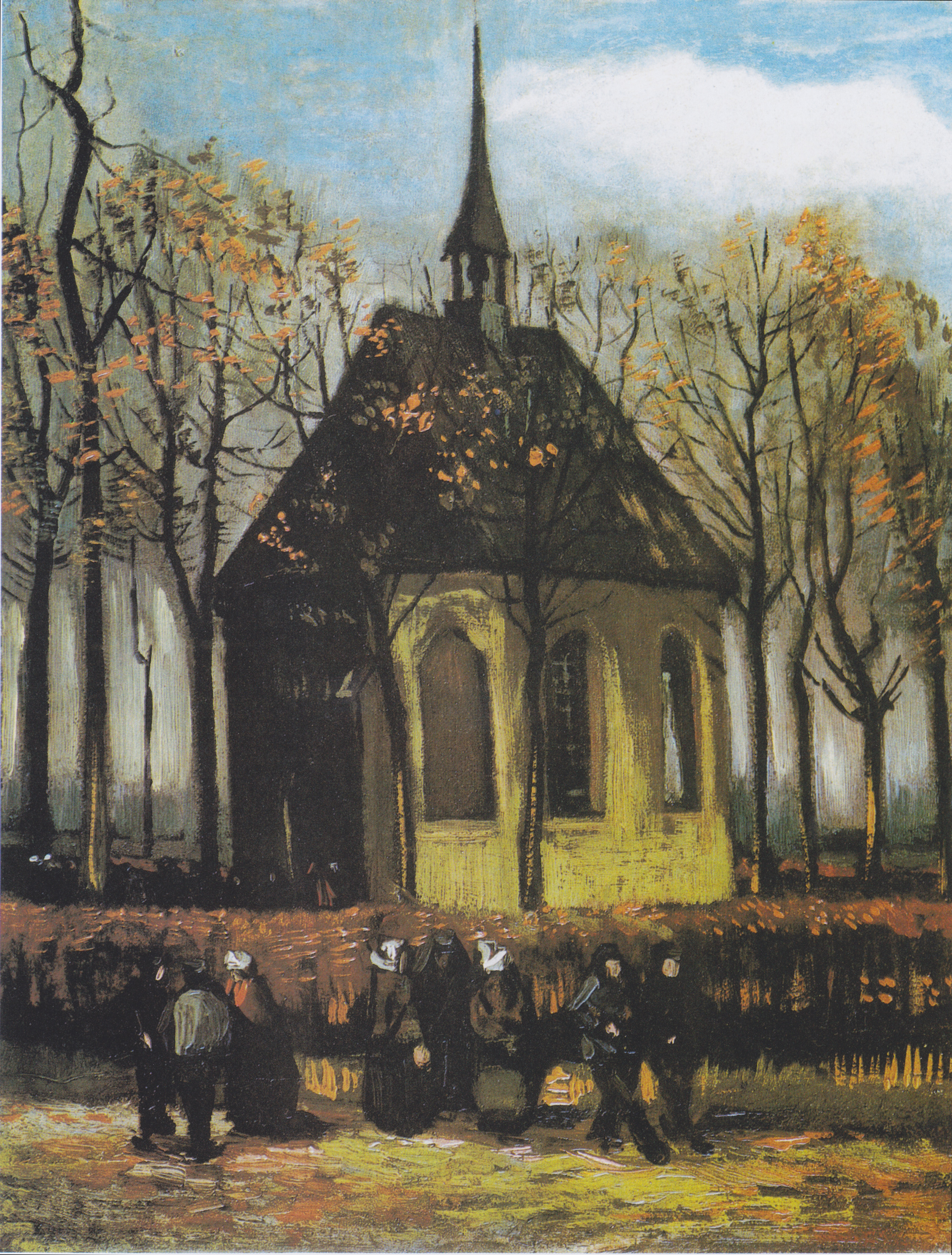
Congregation Leaving the Reformed Church in Nuenen by Van Gogh

Notable finds
Artist and work	Creation date(s) (est.)	Year lost (est.)	Year found	Loss event and recovery
Agesander/Athenodoros/Polydorus Laocoön and His Sons	27 BC-68 AD		1506-1906	Destruction of Emperor Titus' palace; recovered during vineyard excavations. (Note: Except for the arm found in 1906)
Caravaggio The Taking of Christ	1602	1802	1990	Misattribution by heirs of Ciriaco Mattei
Bacon Study after Velázquez II	1950–53	1953	1999	Thought destroyed by the artist
Bacon Study after Velázquez I	1950–53	1953	1999	Thought destroyed by the artist
Courbet Femme nue couchée	1862	1945	2000	Soviet looting of Budapest
Cimabue Virgin and Child with Two Angels	1280-89	1800-99	2000	Possibly Napoleonic looting of art
Reni, Guido Ariadne from Bacchus and Ariadne ceiling painting	1638-40	1650	2002	Disassembled for easier sale by the estate of Michel Particelli d'Émery. A fragment at Fondazione del Monte di Bologna e Ravenna recognized as the lost Ariadne by Andrea Emiliani and Sir Denis Mahon
Giovane, Palma Francesco St Jerome	1595	1750–99	2008	
Delaroche Charles I Insulted by Cromwell's Soldiers	1836	1941	2009	Thought destroyed in the Bridgewater House bombing in WWII but found in Scotland rolled up with only some shrapnel damage.
Bereny, Robert Sleeping Lady with Black Vase	1920	1929	2009	Spotted as a prop in the film Stuart Little
Monet Beach in Pourville	1882	2000	2010	National Museum, Poznań theft
Van Dyck Magistrate of Brussels oil sketch	1634	1695	2012	Overpainting
Fabergé Third Imperial Egg	1887	1922	2012	Russian Revolution
Gauguin Fruits on a table or still life with a small dog	1889	1970	2014	Terrence Kennedy residence, London, theft
Caravaggio Judith Beheading Holofernes	1604-05	1700	2014	
Van Gogh Beach at Scheveningen in Stormy Weather	1882	2002	2016	2002 Van Gogh Museum theft
Van Gogh Congregation Leaving the Reformed Church in Nuenen	1884	2002	2016	2002 Van Gogh Museum theft
Cimabue The Mocking of Christ	1280-89	1800-99	2019	Possibly Napoleonic looting of art
Picasso Head of a Woman	1939	2012	2021	2012 Athens National Gallery theft
Mondrian Stammer Windmill	1905	2012	2021	2012 Athens National Gallery theft
Kuna, Henryk Alina, a Girl with a Jug	1936	1990	1991	Stolen, recovered damaged and restored

== Lists of Wikipedia articles on notable destroyed artworks ==
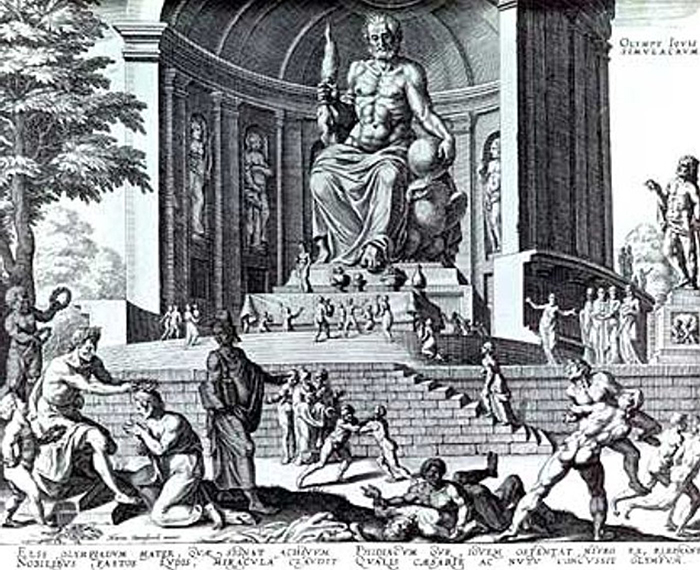
16th century artistic representation of how the Statue of Zeus at Olympia might have looked.

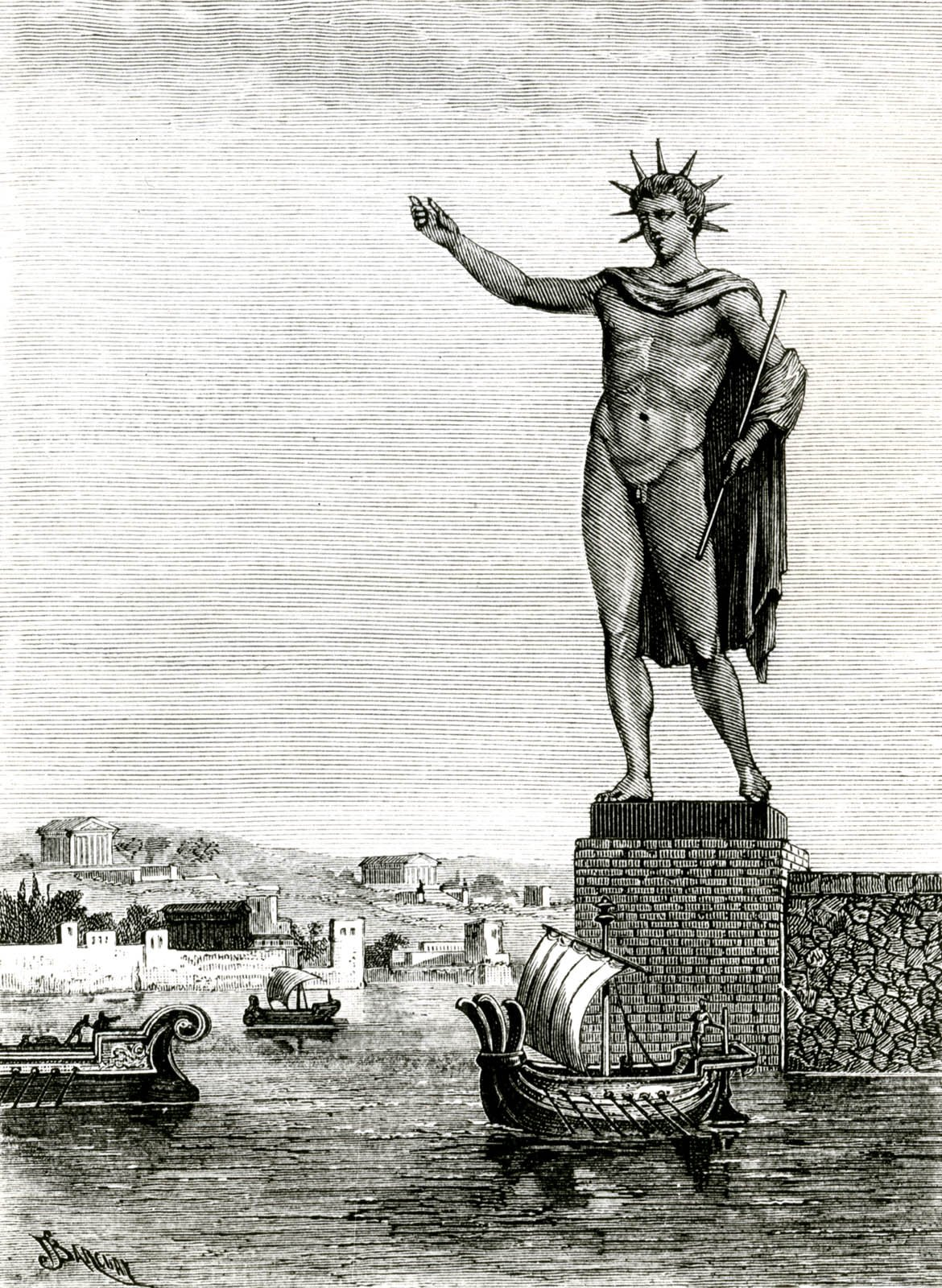
The Colossus of Rhodes was one of the Seven Wonders of the Ancient World.

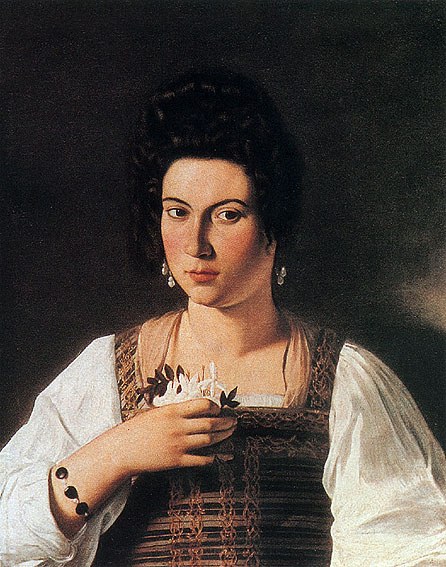
Portrait of a Courtesan by Caravaggio, formerly in the Kaiser-Friedrich-Museum, Berlin

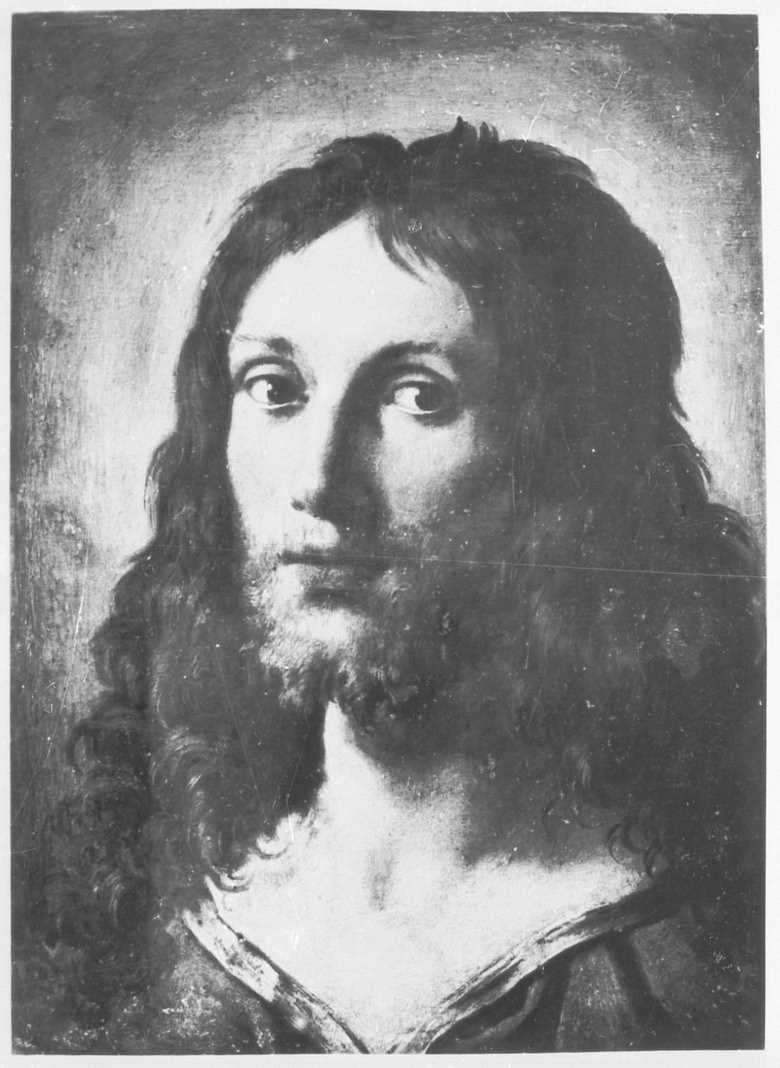
A lost Christus head by Annibale Carracci

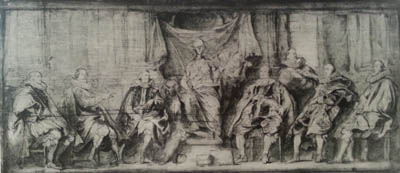
Grisaille sketch of Magistrates of Brussels, in the École nationale supérieure des Beaux-Arts in Paris

List of Wikipedia articles and article sections on notable artworks presumed destroyed
Artist and work	Creation date(s) (est.)	Year lost (est.)	Loss event	Commission, provenance, documentation and surviving copies
Polygnotus Sack of Troy	475-425 BCE			Lesche of the Knidians. Pausanias in Description of Greece, Chapter X
Polygnotus Odysseus in the Underworld	475-425 BCE			Lesche of the Knidians. Pausanias in Description of Greece, Chapter X
Phidias Lemnian Athena bronze	450-440 BCE			Parthenon
Zeuxis Female Centaur Nursing a Pair of Twins	450-400 BCE	86 BCE	Antikythera wreck	Looted by Roman General Sulla in the First Mithridatic War
Phidias Statue of Zeus at Olympia	435 BCE	448	Lauseion fire	
Lysippus Seated Herakles colossal bronze	399-400 BCE	1204	Fourth Crusade	Taras Acropolis, then the Capitoline Hill, (Note: Taken to Rome by Fabius Maximus in 209 BCE) then the Constantinople Hippodrome
Praxiteles Aphrodite of Knidos marble	365 BCE	306-95	Persecution of pagans	Temple of Aphrodite, Knidos. (Note: May have been removed to the Palace of Lausus, which then burned in 475.) Iris Love found statue fragments in 1970.
Chares of Lindos Colossus of Rhodes	292-280 BCE	226 BCE	Rhodes earthquake	
Regisole	193-526	1796	Jacobin vandalism (Note: Destroyed as a symbol of monarchy)	Erected at Ravenna. Moved to Pavia in the Middle Ages. (Note: A replica stands where original once stood)
Portraits of western and eastern imperial family members mosaic	425	1747	Rebuilding	San Giovanni Evangelista, Ravenna (Note: Commissioned by Galla Placidia)
Portrait of the bishop of Ravenna mosaic	425	1747	Rebuilding	San Giovanni Evangelista, Ravenna
Buddhas of Bamyan	500-99	2001	Taliban iconoclasm	
Icon of Christ Chalkites	600	726-30	Byzantine Iconoclasm	Copies exist.
Cavallini, Pietro Stories from the New and Old Testament fresco cycles	1277-85	1823	Fire	Basilica of Saint Paul Outside the Walls
Cimabue Diptych of Devotion panels	1280-89			
Giotto Navicella mosaic	1305-13	1650	Reconstruction	Outside Old Saint Peter's Basilica. Copies and drawings exist. Replicated.
Guariento Paradise	1338-70	1577	Doge's Palace fire	Doge's Palace
Monaco, Lorenzo Virgin Enthroned with Saints and Angels	1420	1945	Friedrichshain flak tower fire	
da Fabriano, Gentile Various works	1405-27	1577	Doge's Palace fire	Doge's Palace
Donatello Joshua terra cotta	1410	1750	Disintegrated	North tribune of the Duomo of Florence
Pisanello Various works	1415-55	1577	Doge's Palace fire	Doge's Palace
Pisanello Hunting scenes frescoes	1424-40	1527	War of the League of Cognac	Visconti Castle for Filippo Maria Visconti
Pisanello Saint George Sheathing his Sword fresco	1433-38	1826	Water damage	Pellegrini chapel, Sant'Anastasia, Verona
Masaccio Sagra del Carmine fresco	1422	1600	Renovation	Cloister of Santa Maria del Carmine, Florence
Uccello, Paolo Saint Peter Blessing mosaic	1425-30	1618	Renovation (Note: Replaced with mosaics by Gaetano)	Basilica of San Marco façade
Lippi, Filippo Bestowal of the Carmelite Rule fresco	1425-69	1771	Fire and Flood	Cloister of Santa Maria del Carmine, Florence. Fragments survive in place (Note: Uncovered in 1860)
da Fabriano, Gentile and Pisanello Frescoes	1427/28	1647	Reconstruction	Basilica of Saint John Lateran
Donatello Abundance	1428	1750	Weathering	Baptistery of the Duomo, later Mercato Vecchio. Copied in terra cotta (Note: By the workshop of Giovanni della Robbia)
da Panicale, Masolino and Uccello Illustrious Men fresco cycle	1432			For the Palace of Cardinal Orsini in Rome. A watercolor copy by Leonardo da Besozzo survives
van der Weyden The Justice of Trajan and Herkinbald	1439	1695	Bombardment of Brussels	Brussels Town Hall. (Note: In the Golden Chamber) Bern Historical Museum has tapestry copies. (Note: Executed about 1450 copying the artist's original designs)
del Castagno, Andrea Flagellation fresco	1440-57	1650		Cloister of the Basilica of Santa Croce, Florence
Van Eyck Madonna of Nicolas van Maelbeke	1441	1792–1815	French occupation of The Netherlands	St Martin's Cathedral. Copy in Germanisches Nationalmuseum.
Christus, Petrus (attributed) Crucifixion	1444	1942	World War II	Dessau Palace/Palais Reina. Black and white photograph survives.
Veneziano, Domenico and del Castagno, Andrea Life of the Virgin frescoes	1450-52	1594		In the church of Sant' Egidio (Santa Maria Nuova), Florence
Mantegna Lives of Saint James and Saint Christopher frescoes	1450-57	1944	World War II	Ovetari Chapel. (Note: Frescoes of the Assumption and Body of Saint Christopher detached in 1880 survive) Photographs survive.
da Messina, Antonello Scenes from the life of Saint Nicholas altarpiece	1450-76	1908	Messina earthquake	For the Confraternity of San Nicolò della Montagna in Messina, seen by Cavalcaselle in 1871
Fra Angelico, school of Last Judgment	1456	1945	Friedrichshain flak tower fire	
della Francesca, Piero Frescoes	1456		Destroyed? (Note: Possibly covered up by Raphael before painting the Stanze)	
Foppa, Vincenzo Triumph of Trajan fresco	1456-1500	1863	Demolition	Done for the Medici bank in the Via de' Bossi, Milan. A fragment survives in the Wallace Collection, London
Mantegna Lamentation of the People over the Dead Gattamelata	1457-60	1760		Palazzo Gattamelata, Padua. A related drawing is in The Wallace Collection, London
Perugino Adoration of the Magi fresco	1466-80	1529	Siege of Florence	For the convent of S. Giusto alle Mura
Botticelli Paintings on "pagan" subjects	1470-92	1497	Bonfire of the Vanities	
Bellini, Giovanni Saint Catherine of Siena Altarpiece (Sacra Conversazione)	1470-1500	1867		Chapel of the Rosary of the Church of Santi Giovanni e Paolo, Venice
Signorelli, Luca The Court of Pan (The School of Pan)	1472-74	1945	Friedrichshain flak tower fire	Painted c. 1490 at the request of Lorenzo de' Medici. Black and white photo and reconstruction drawing (2021) by Olivier Maceratesi
Signorelli, Luca Madonna and Saints fresco	1474	1789		In the Tower of Città di Castello
Vivarini, Alvise Otho Promising to Mediate Between Venice and Barbarossa	1476-1500	1577	Doge's Palace fire	Doge's Palace
Botticelli Piero di Cosimo de' Medici	1478	1942	World War II	Formerly Museo Civico Filangieri, Naples. Photographs survive
Botticelli Frescoes depicting the criminal conspirators of the Pazzi Conspiracy against the Medici	1478	1494	Removed	Painted either in the Bargello or the Dogana in Florence. At the instigation of Pope Alexander VI after the fall of the Medicis
da Forlì, Melozzo Ascension with Christ in Glory fresco	1478-80	1711	Renovation	For the choir of the Church of the Santi Apostoli, Rome. Fragments survive in the Vatican and Quirinal
da Forlì, Melozzo Feo Chapel vault fresco	1478-80	1945	World War II	For the San Biagio Church in Forlì. Graphical notes by Girolamo Reggiani (1831) Black and White photo (1944) and color reconstruction drawing (2020) by Olivier Maceratesi
da Vinci Leonardo's horse terracotta model	1482	1499	French invasion of Milan	
Costa, Lorenzo Destruction of Troy fresco	1483	1507	Destroyed with the palace by a mob	For the loggia of the Bentivoglio Palace, Bologna. Fragment survives in the Pinacoteca Nazionale
Vivarini, Alvise Altarpiece for the church of Santa Maria dei Battuti in Belluno	1485	1942-45	World War II	
Botticelli, Ghirlandaio, Filippino Lippi and Perugino Frescoes on mythological themes, including the Forge of Vulcan	1487-90	1825	Water damage then fire (Note: Damaged by damp and finally destroyed by fire in the early 19th century)	For Lorenzo de' Medici in the great hall and external loggia of his villa at Spedaletto, near Volterra
Mantegna Baptism of Christ fresco	1488	1780	Redevelopment	Belvedere Chapel of the Vatican. Destroyed at the construction of the Pio-Clementino Museum
Bellini, Giovanni The Supper at Emmaus	1494	1750	Fire in Vienna in the 18th century	Painted for Giorgio Cornaro of Venice
Ghirlandaio, Domenico Virgin and Child in Glory with Saints John the Evangelist, Francis, Jerome and John the Baptist	1496	1945	Friedrichshain flak tower fire	In the Church of San Francesco in San Casciano, Val di Pesa until 1810.
Fra Bartolomeo Assumption of the Virgin	1507-08	1945	Friedrichshain flak tower fire	
Michelangelo Battle of Cascina cartoon			Putatively destroyed by Bandinelli	Palazzo Vecchio
Michelangelo Cupid marble		1698	Palace of Whitehall fire	Owned by Isabella d'Este and Charles I of England
Caravaggio Portrait of a Courtesan		1945	Friedrichshain flak tower fire	Formerly in the Kaiser-Friedrich-Museum, Berlin
Michelangelo Pope Julius II in the act of blessing bronze		1511	Destroyed by the people of Bologna	On San Petronio basilica's facade in Bologna
Correggio The Coronation of the Virgin fresco		1587		Church of San Giovanni Evangelista, Parma. Fragments in National Gallery, London, other museums
Correggio Saint Mary Magdalen in the Desert fresco		1555	Destruction of Palazzo della Delizie	Painted for Veronica Gambara's Palazzo della Delizie, in the town of Correggio. Described in a letter dated Sept. 3, 1528 from Veronica Gambara to Isabella d’Este
Correggio Magdalen in the Desert		1945-	World War II	Dresden
Raphael Crowning of Saint Nicholas of Tolentino		1700–99	Earthquake	Raphael's first recorded commission, it was made for Andrea Baronci's chapel in the church of Sant'Agostino in Citta di Castello, near Urbino At least four fragments survive (Louvre, Capodimonte)
Dürer Ascension of Mary altarpiece		1729	Fire	The central panel added to the collection of Elector Maximilian of Bavaria. A 1615 copy of the entire altarpiece by Jobst Harrich of Nuremberg survives
Huber, Wolf Portrait of an Architect (Self-Portrait?)	1529	1947	Fire at the Musée de Beaux Arts, Strasbourg, August 13, 1947 (one of 30 paintings destroyed)	
Cranach the Elder Cardinal Albrecht of Brandenburg, Archbishop of Mainz		1945	Friedrichshain flak tower fire	
Cranach the Elder Virgin and Child with Four Female Saints		1945	Friedrichshain flak tower fire	
Cranach the Elder Madonna and Child with Infant Saint John		1945	Friedrichshain flak tower fire	
Cranach the Elder Duke Henry of Saxony		1945	Bombing of Dresden	
Brueghel the Elder The Farmers Brawl		1945	Bombing of Dresden	Engraved by Lucas Vosterman, c. 1620
Holbein Henry VIII and family mural		1698	Palace of Whitehall fire	In Whitehall Palace, London
Holbein Sir Thomas More and Family		1752	Kroměříž Palace fire	
Titian Battle of Spoleto		1577	Doge's Palace fire	
Titian Battle of Cadore		1577	Doge's Palace fire	
Titian Doge Gritti Praying to the Virgin		1577	Doge's Palace fire	
Tintoretto Coronation of Frederick Barbarossa		1577	Doge's Palace fire	
Tintoretto Excommunication of Barbarossa		1577	Doge's Palace fire	
Tintoretto Last Judgment		1577	Doge's Palace fire	
Veronese Homage of Frederick Barbarossa		1577	Doge's Palace fire	
da Fabriano, Gentile Works		1577	Doge's Palace fire	
Pisanello Works		1577	Doge's Palace fire	
Carpaccio Pope Alexander III in the Church of St. Marks		1577	Doge's Palace fire	
Carpaccio Meeting of the Pope and the Doge at Ancona		1577	Doge's Palace fire	
Vivarini, Alvise Otho Promising to Mediate Between Venice and Barbarossa		1577	Doge's Palace fire	
Guariento Paradise		1577	Doge's Palace fire	
Bellini Battle of Salvore		1577	Doge's Palace fire	
Bellini Presentation of the White Candle to the Pope		1577	Doge's Palace fire	
Bellini Presentation of the Eight Standards and Trumpets to the Doge		1577	Doge's Palace fire	
del Vaga Christ at the Pool of Bethesda fresco	1537–39	1850s	Renovation	Massimi Chapel, Santa Trinità dei Monti. (Note: Companion piece, The Raising of Lazarus (transferred to canvas) is in the V&A)
del Vaga Christ and the Centurion fresco	1537–39	1850s	Renovation	Massimi Chapel, Santa Trinità dei Monti.
del Vaga The Transfiguration fresco	1537–39	1850s	Renovation	Massimi Chapel, Santa Trinità dei Monti.
del Vaga The Expulsion from the Temple fresco	1537–39	1850s	Renovation	Massimi Chapel, Santa Trinità dei Monti.
Titian Death of St Peter Martyr		1867	Fire	For the Chapel of the Rosary, Santi Giovanni e Paolo, Venice. Copies and engravings survive
Titian Double Portrait of Emperor Charles V and his wife Isabella of Portugal		1734	Royal Alcázar of Madrid fire	A copy by Rubens survives
Titian Penitent Magdalene	1561	1873	Fire at Bath House, London, January 21	Painted for Philip II of Spain
Titian Ixion and Tantalus		1734	Royal Alcázar of Madrid fire	
Titian Paintings of The Twelve Caesars		1734	Royal Alcázar of Madrid fire	
Palladio or Giorgio Capobianco The Jewel of Vicenza	1578	1797	Destroyed by the Napoleonic army when they tried to melt it down for silver	Created as an ex-voto and financed by donations from the city of Vicenza. A silver reconstruction was made in 2012–2013
Veronese Apollo and Juno	1580	1945	Friedrichshain flak tower fire	Painted for the Fondaco dei Tedeschi, Venice
Veronese Saturn Helps Religion to Overcome Heresy	1580	1945	Friedrichshain flak tower fire	Painted for the Fondaco dei Tedeschi, Venice
Pontormo God the Father and the Four Evangelists fresco		1700–99	Remodeling	Capponi Chapel, Church of Santa Felicita, Florence
Pontormo Last Judgment		1700–99	Renovations	Unfinished fresco at the Basilica of San Lorenzo, Florence
Caravaggio Portrait of a Courtesan, aka Fillide Melandroni	1597-1599	1945	Friedrichshain flak tower fire	
Vroom, Hendrick The Armada Tapestries	1602	1834	Burning of Parliament	For Charles Howard, 1st Earl of Nottingham; sold to James I, 1616 and placed in the House of Lords, London by Oliver Cromwell, 1650. Engraved by John Pine, 1739
da Bologna, Giovanni Henry IV of France equestrian bronze	1614	1789–99	Scrapped	Presented to Marie de Medicis by Cosimo II. Melted for cannon (French Revolution).
Poussin The Martyrdom of Erasmus	1630	1945	Bombing of Dresden	
Poussin Penance, one of the seven Sacraments	1637–1640	1816	Belvoir Castle fire	
Lorrain, Claude Queen Esther Approaching the Palace of Ahasuerus	1658	1755	Fonthill Abbey fire	A fragment in the collection of the Earl of Leicester, Holkham Hall
Lorrain, Claude Apollo Guarding the Herds of Admetus and Mercury Stealing Them	1660–1673	1871	Holker Hall fire	
Rubens The Crucifixion	1601–02	1820-	Lost at sea	Painted for the Church of Santa Croce in Gerusalemme, Rome. Imported to England 1811; there auctioned 1812, 1820
Rubens Madonna of the Rosary		1695	Bombardment of Brussels	Painted for the Royal Chapel of the Dominican Church, Brussels
Rubens Virgin Adorned with Flowers by Saint Anne	1610	1695	Bombardment of Brussels	Painted for the Church of the Carmelite Friars, Brussels
Rubens Saint Job Triptych	1613	1695	Bombardment of Brussels	Painted for Saint Nicholas Church, Brussels
Rubens Cambyses Appointing Otanes Judge		1695	Bombardment of Brussels	Decoration for the Magistrates' Hall, Brussels
Rubens Judgment of Solomon		1695	Bombardment of Brussels	Decoration for the Magistrates' Hall, Brussels
Rubens Last Judgment		1695	Bombardment of Brussels	Decoration for the Magistrates' Hall, Brussels
Rubens Neptune and Amphitrite	1615	1945	Friedrichshain flak tower fire	
Rubens Nativity		1731	Coudenberg Palace fire	
Rubens Adoration of the Magi		1731	Coudenberg Palace fire	
Rubens Pentecost		1731	Coudenberg Palace fire	
Rubens The Abduction of Proserpine		1861	Fire at Blenheim Palace, Oxfordshire, February 5, 1861	Engraved before 1621 by Pieter Soutman
Rubens Crucifixion with Mary, St. John, Magdalen	1622	1643	English Civil War	In the Queen's Chapel, Somerset House, London, 1643
Rubens Portrait of Philip IV of Spain	1628	1985	Incendiary attack at the Kunsthaus, Zurich, in 1985	
Rubens Diana and Nymphs Surprised by Satyrs	1635–1638	1945	Friedrichshain flak tower fire	
Rubens Equestrian Portrait of Philip IV of Spain		1734	Royal Alcázar of Madrid fire	A copy is in the Uffizi Gallery
Rubens The Continence of Scipio		1836	Western Exchange Fire	In the Western Exchange, Old Bond Street, London, March 1836
Rubens The Lion Hunt		1870	Fire at the Musée des Beaux-Arts de Bordeaux	Removed by Napoleon's agents from Schloss Schleissheim, near Munich, 1800
Rubens Equestrian Portrait of the Duke of Buckingham		1949	Fire	Owned by the Earl of Jersey at Osterley Park
Van Dyck and Rubens Series of 39 ceiling paintings for the Jesuit Church in Antwerp (nl:Carolus Borromeuskerk#Branden, Dutch wiki)		1718	Fire	Engravings by Jan Punt (Amsterdam 1751) of 31 of the paintings from drawings executed 1711-12 by Jacob de Wit exist
Rubens and Brueghel the Elder Vision of Saint Hubert		1945	Friedrichshain flak tower fire	
Brueghel the Elder and other artists Allegories of Sight and Smell		1731	Coudenberg Palace fire	Bought (with the following entry) by the City of Antwerp and hung in audience hall, Tervuren Castle 1619
Brueghel the Elder and other artists Allegories of Hearing, Taste and Touch		1731	Coudenberg Palace fire	
Van Dyck Group Portrait of the Town Council of Brussels	1634-35	1695	Bombardment of Brussels	
Van Dyck Christ Crowned with Thorns		1945	Friedrichshain flak tower fire	
Van Dyck Lamentation over Christ		1945	Friedrichshain flak tower fire	
Van Dyck Nymphs Surprised by Satyrs		1945	Friedrichshain flak tower fire	
Van Dyck Saints John the Baptist and John the Evangelist		1945	Friedrichshain flak tower fire	
van Honthorst, Gerrit Adoration of the Shepherds (Birth of Christ)		1993	Uffizi car bombing	
de Keyser, Thomas Six Gold and Silver Smiths (The "Bankers of Amsterdam")	1627	1947	Fire at the Musée de Beaux Arts, Strasbourg, August 13, 1947 (one of 30 paintings destroyed)	
van Ruisdael, Jacob Bentheim Castle with Christ and Disciples on the Road to Emmaus		1864	Museum Boymans fire	
van Ruisdael, Jacob The Windmill		1871	Holker Hall fire	
Fabritius, Carel Large family portrait		1864	Museum Boymans fire	
Cuyp, Aelbert Sleeping Man		1864	Museum Boymans fire	
Steen, Jan Tobias Healing His Father		1864	Museum Boymans fire	
Potter, Paulus White Ox in a Field		1864	Museum Boymans fire	
Potter, Paulus Large Herd of Oxen		1771	Vrouw Maria sinking	Purchased for Fl. 9050, Braamcamp sale, Amsterdam, 1771 by agents of Catherine the Great.
Caravaggio The Inspiration of Matthew first version	1601	1945	Friedrichshain flak tower fire	
Caravaggio Christ on the Mount of Olives	1605	1945	Friedrichshain flak tower fire	From the collection of Vincenzo Giustiniani
Caravaggio Saint John		1798	Earthquake	Done for the Fenaroli chapel, Sant'Anna dei Lombardi, Naples
Caravaggio Saint Francis		1798	Earthquake	Done for the Fenaroli chapel, Sant'Anna dei Lombardi, Naples
Caravaggio Resurrection		1798	Earthquake	Done for the Fenaroli chapel, Sant'Anna dei Lombardi, Naples. A 1763 description by Charles-Nicolas Cochin survives.
Gentileschi, Orazio The Conversion of Saint Paul altarpiece		1823	Fire	Done for the basilica of San Paolo fuori le Mura, Rome
Fontana, Lavinia The Stoning of Saint Stephen altarpiece		1823	Fire	Done for the basilica of San Paolo fuori le Mura, Rome
Gentileschi, Artemisia Hercules and Omphale	1628	1734	Royal Alcázar of Madrid fire	Painted for Philip IV of Spain
Gentileschi, Artemisia Bathsheba	1650–1652	1940	Fire at Gosford House, Scotland	
Manfredi, Bartolomeo La Buonavventura		1993	Uffizi car bombing	
Manfredi, Bartolomeo Ciclo Vito		1993	Uffizi car bombing	
Carracci, Annibale Danae		1941	The Blitz (Bridgewater House bombing)	Ellesmere collection
Carracci, Annibale Saint Gregory Praying for Souls in Purgatory, altarpiece	1600	1941	The Blitz (Bridgewater House bombing)	Church of San Gregorio Magno, Rome; then Ellesmere collection
Carracci, Ludovico Descent from the Cross		1941	The Blitz (Bridgewater House bombing)	Ellesmere collection
Reni, Guido Immaculate Conception		1941	World War II	Formerly Seville Cathedral, Spain, later in the Ellesmere collection, Bridgewater House, Westminster, London
Bernini Bust of King Charles I (Bernini)		1698	Palace of Whitehall fire	
Bernini Crucified Christ in bronze		1789–99	French Revolution	Formerly in the French royal collection
Velasquez Expulsion of the Moors with Philip III	1627	1734	Royal Alcázar of Madrid fire	
Velasquez Venus and Adonis		1734	Royal Alcázar of Madrid fire	
Velasquez Cupid and Psyche		1734	Royal Alcázar of Madrid fire	
Velasquez Apollo and Marsyas		1734	Royal Alcázar of Madrid fire	
Zurbarán Saint Bonaventure Reveals the Crucifix to Saint Thomas Aquinas		1945	Friedrichshain flak tower fire	Commissioned by the Colegio de San Buenaventura, Seville. Taken from Spain by Marshal Soult
Murillo Caritas Romana (Roman Charity)		1845	Fire	Taken from Spain by Joseph Bonaparte and sold to the Pennsylvania Academy of Fine Art
Giordano, Luca The Labors of Hercules sixteen frescoes	1692–1702	1800–99		Central hall of the Casón, Buen Retiro Palace
Giordano, Luca Life of Saint Benedict frescoes		1944	Battle of Monte Cassino	Painted for the Abbey of Monte Cassino.
Giordano, Luca The Rape of the Sabine Women		1945	Bombing of Dresden	Gemäldegalerie Alte Meister
Kneller, Godfrey William III Leading Troops at the Battle of the Boyne		1965	Grocers' Hall fire	
Coypel, Antoine Venus Imploring Jupiter on Behalf of Aeneas ceiling painting	1702	1783-		Grand Gallery of the Palais-Royal. A sketch for it survives
van Nost, John King George I of Great Britain equestrian statue	1716	1872	Vandalised, sold and removed	Formerly part of the Duke of Chandos' collection at Cannons; moved to Leicester Square in London in 1784
Chardin Still Life with Copper Kettle, Bowl with Eggs	1724–25	1945	Friedrichshain flak tower fire	
Watteau Idol of the Goddess Ki Mao Sao in the Kingdom of Mang in the country of Laos	1719	1789–99	French Revolution	Château de la Muette decorations
Watteau Spring	1717-18	1966	Fire	Pierre Crozat collection. Rediscovered in 1964 then destroyed. Autumn and Winter still missing. Engravings survive.
Hogarth, William A Harlot's Progress	1731	1755	Fire at Fonthill Abbey	1732 engravings survive
Hogarth, William Strolling Actresses Dressing in a Barn	1738	1874	Fire at Littleton House in December	An engraving by the artist survives
Hudson, Thomas William Bouverie		1952	Coleshill House fire	
Hudson, Thomas Anne Bouverie		1952	Coleshill House fire	
Hudson, Thomas Mary Bouverie		1952	Coleshill House fire	
Tiepolo, Gianbattista The Translation of the Holy House of Loreto fresco		1915	Austrian shelling in World War I	In the Church of the Scalzi, Venice. There is a copy of the entire ceiling from before 1914, painted in gouache after the original by Mariano Fortuny, a 1914 photograph by James Anderson and a reconstruction drawing (2019) by Olivier Maceratesi
Tiepolo, Gianbattista and Giandomenico Tiepolo Soderini family frescoes	1754	1918	Italo-Austrian engagement in World War I, June 15–19	Villa Soderini, Nervesa della Battaglia, in the Veneto. Photographs survive.
Tiepolo, Gianbattista The Triumph of the Arts and Sciences ceiling fresco	1731	1943	Palazzo Archinto, Milan bombing	Photographs survive
Tiepolo, Gianbattista Apollo and Phaethon ceiling fresco	1731	1943	Palazzo Archinto, Milan bombing	
Tiepolo, Gianbattista Perseus and Andromeda ceiling fresco	1731	1943	Palazzo Archinto, Milan bombing	
Tiepolo, Gianbattista Juno with Fortuna and Venus ceiling fresco	1731	1943	Palazzo Archinto, Milan bombing	
Tiepolo, Gianbattista Triumph of Hercules ceiling fresco	1761	1945	Reduced to fragments by bombing in WWII	Painted for the principal salon of the Palazzo Canossa, Verona
de Loutherbourg, Philip James The Eidophusikon	1781			
Reynolds, Sir Joshua Nativity		1816	Belvoir Castle fire	
Reynolds, Sir Joshua The Infant Jupiter		1816	Belvoir Castle fire	
Reynolds, Sir Joshua General James Oglethorpe		1816	Belvoir Castle fire	
Gainsborough David Garrick leaning on a bust of Shakespeare	1766	1946	Fire at Stratford-upon-Avon Town Hall	Painted for the Stratford Shakespeare Jubilee. Known from engravings and various copies
Gainsborough Wooded landscape with gipsies round a camp fire also named The Gipsies	1754	<1831		A 1764 engraving published by John Boydell exists
Gainsborough The Woodman and his Dog in a Storm	1787	1810	Fire at Exton Old Park	A 1791 mezzotint by Pierre Simon exists
Gainsborough Cottage Children with an Ass		1810	Fire at Exton Old Park	Survives in mezzotint
Gainsborough Portrait of Sir Francis Sykes of Basildon with a groom, two horses, and a dog		1874	Fire at the Pantechnicon warehouse, London February 13–14	
Wilson, Richard The Destruction of Niobe's Children		1944	World War II	National Gallery, London
Copley, John Singleton Numerous colonial portraits		1872	Great Boston Fire of 1872	Formerly belonging to Peter Wainwright
Peale, Charles Willson Portrait of Thomas Paine	1777	1893	Fire at Joseph Jefferson's summer house in Buttermilk Bay, April 1	Exhibited in Peale's Museum to 1854, later owned by T.B. MacDonough and the actor Joseph Jefferson. An engraving survives.
Houdon, Jean-Antoine Bust of the composer Gluck in marble		1873	Fire at the Paris Opera	Terra cotta versions exist
Tiepolo, Giandomenico Glorification of the Giustiniani Family (fresco)	1784	1866	Allowed to decay and replaced	Executed for the Doge's Palace, Genoa. A preliminary sketch is in the Metropolitan Museum.
Beechey, William George III and the Prince of Wales Reviewing Troops	1797–98	1992	Windsor Castle fire	
Goya Don Antonio de Porcel	1806	1956	Fire in the Jockey Club, Buenos Aires	
Stuart, Gilbert Seated portrait of President Washington		1851	Library of Congress fire	
Stuart, Gilbert Seated portrait of President Adams		1851	Library of Congress fire	
Stuart, Gilbert Seated portrait of President Jefferson		1851	Library of Congress fire	
Peale, Charles Willson Portrait of Peyton Randolph, Speaker of the Virginia House of Burgesses		1851	Library of Congress fire	
Canova George Washington, marble sculpture		1831	Fire in the North Carolina State House, Raleigh	The artist's plaster model survives
Peale, Rembrandt The Dream of Love (Jupiter and Io)		<1855	Fire while on exhibition in New York prior to 1855, according to the artist	
Peale, Rembrandt Musidora		1850–51	Fire at a Philadelphia art gallery in 1850 or 1851	
Friedrich, Caspar David Winter	1807–08	1931	Glaspalast (Munich) fire	
Friedrich, Caspar David The Farewell	1818	1931	Glaspalast (Munich) fire	
Friedrich, Caspar David The Harbor at Grifswald	1820	1931	Glaspalast (Munich) fire	
Friedrich, Caspar David Autumn Landscape with Brush Collector	1824	1931	Glaspalast (Munich) fire	
Friedrich, Caspar David Evening	1825	1931	Glaspalast (Munich) fire	
Friedrich, Caspar David Mountain Chapel in the Mist	1811	1945	Friedrichshain flak tower fire	
Friedrich, Caspar David Monastery Graveyard in the Snow	1817–18	1945	Friedrichshain flak tower fire	
Friedrich, Caspar David High Mountain Region	1824	1945	Friedrichshain flak tower fire	
Friedrich, Caspar David Northern Lights	1830–1835	1945	Friedrichshain flak tower fire	
Turner The Mouth of the Thames	1807	1939–1945	World War II	
Turner Fish Market on the Sands	1830	1956	Fire	formerly owned by Billy Rose
Landseer, Sir Edwin War and Peace	1846	1928	Thames flooding	Was in the basement of the Tate Gallery. Engravings of both survive. A copy of War appeared on the television program Fake or Fortune, where it was thought to possibly be the original.
Bragaldi, Mario Jupiter on Mount Olympus ceiling fresco	1850s	2018	National Museum of Brazil fire	Done for Emperor Pedro II of Brazil
Bragaldi, Mario Justice ceiling fresco	1850s	2018	National Museum of Brazil fire	
Bragaldi, Mario Fortitude ceiling fresco	1850s	2018	National Museum of Brazil fire	
Bragaldi, Mario Temperance ceiling fresco	1850s	2018	National Museum of Brazil fire	
Bragaldi, Mario Prudence ceiling fresco	1850s	2018	National Museum of Brazil fire	
Leutze, Emanuel Washington Crossing the Delaware (first version)	1849–50	1942	Air raid on Bremen	
Ingres Apotheosis of Napoleon I ceiling painting		1871	Hôtel de Ville fire	
Delaroche, Paul The Storming of the Bastille	1830	1871	Hôtel de Ville fire	
Delacroix, Eugène Justinian Drafting his Laws	1826	1871	Fire in the Paris Commune	Painted for the Council of State, Paris. An 1855 photograph survives
Delacroix, Eugène Peace Consoles Mankind and Brings Abundance	1852–1854	1871	Hôtel de Ville fire	
Chassériau, Théodore War and Peace murals	1848	1871	Fire in the Paris Commune	Painted for the Cour des Comptes, Palais of the Quai d'Orsay, Paris. A fragment of Peace is preserved in the Louvre
Winterhalter, Franz Xaver Napoleon III	1856	1871	Tuileries Palace fire	Models by the artist and copies exist
Winterhalter, Franz Xaver Empress Eugénie	1856	1871	Tuileries Palace fire	Models by the artist and copies exist
Millet, Jean-François The Jewish Captivity in Babylon	1848	1870–71	Painted over by the artist with a scene executed in Normandy	
Courbet The Stone Breakers		1939–1945	World War II, while in transit from the Dresden Gallery	
Courbet The Return from the Conference	1863	1909	Destroyed by its owner due to its anticlerical content	
Courbet Venus and Psyche	1864	1945	Enemy air action, Berlin, World War II	
Van Gogh Donkey Cart with Boy and Scheveningen Woman	1882	1940	Fire	Formerly in Rotterdam
Carpaccio, Vittore Virgin and Child Enthroned with Saints Faustinus and Jovita, patron saints of Brescia (the Averoldi Altarpiece)				Sacristy of S. Giovanni Evangelista, Brescia. Sold to the National Gallery London, lost in a shipwreck crossing the English Channel
Van Gogh The Parsonage Garden at Nuenen with Pond and Figures	1885	1940	In the German bombing of Rotterdam during World War II	
Van Gogh Windmill on Montmartre	1886	1967	Fire	
Van Gogh Still Life: Vase with Five Sunflowers	1888	1945	American air raids on Ashiya District, August 5–6	Formerly in the collection of Koyata Yamamoto, Japan
Van Gogh The Painter on his Way to Work	1888	1939–1945	Fire in World War II	In the Kaiser-Friedrich Museum, Berlin
Van Gogh The Park at Arles with the Entrance Seen Through the Trees	1888	1939–1945	Fire in World War II	
Inness, George The New Jerusalem		1880	Partial collapse of Madison Square Garden	Salvaged fragments survive, including Valley of the Olive Trees in the Walters Art Museum, Baltimore
Rousseau, Henri Portrait of Alfred Jarry	1895		Destroyed by the sitter, who disliked it	
Sargent Head of Sir Henry Irving			Destroyed by the sitter, who disliked it	
Chase, William Merritt Portrait of Thomas Eakins	1899		Presumed destroyed by the sitter	
Klimt Musik II	1898	1945	Schloss Immendorf fire	Formerly Lederer family collection, Vienna
Klimt Schubert at the Piano	1899	1945	Schloss Immendorf fire	Formerly Lederer family collection, Vienna
Klimt Portrait of Serena Lederer	1899	1945	Schloss Immendorf fire	Formerly Lederer family collection, Vienna
Klimt Medicine	1899–1907	1945	Schloss Immendorf fire	
Klimt Philosophy	1899–1907	1945	Schloss Immendorf fire	
Klimt Jurisprudence	1899–1907	1945	Schloss Immendorf fire	
Klimt Golden Apple Tree	1903	1945	Schloss Immendorf fire	Formerly Lederer family collection, Vienna
Klimt Procession of the Dead	1903	1945	Schloss Immendorf fire	Formerly Lederer family collection, Vienna
Kandinsky Composition I	1910	1944	British air raid on Braunschweig, Germany	Known from photographs
Sloan, John Tammany Hall at Night	1910		Fire, during transit	The artist later created a replica from photographs
Klimt Farm Garden with Crucifix	1911–12	1945	Schloss Immendorf fire	Color images survive
Csaky, Joseph Groupe de femmes	1911–12	1912	First World War	Salon d'Automne, 1913 Salon des Indépendants, Paris. Black & white images survive
Csaky, Joseph Danseuse, (Femme à l'éventail)	1912	1912		Salon d'Automne, Paris, Galerie Moos, Geneva, 1920. Black & white images survive
Archipenko, Alexander La Vie Familiale (Family Life)	1912		First World War bombardment	1912 Salon d'Automne, 1913 Armory Show. Was in Paris during WWI. New York Black & white images survive
Comper, Ninian Rood screen, with sixteen paintings	1912	1993	Bishopsgate bombing	Part of St Ethelburga's Bishopsgate, City of London. Black & white images survive
Csaky, Joseph Head (Tête d'homme)	1913			1913 Salon des Indépendants, Paris, Galerie Moos, Geneva, 1920. Black & white images survive
Klimt Malcesine on Lake Garda	1913	1945	Schloss Immendorf fire	Color images survive
Klimt Garden Path with Chickens	1916	1945	Schloss Immendorf fire	Color images survive
Klimt Portrait of Wally	1916	1945	Schloss Immendorf fire	Formerly Lederer family collection, Vienna
Klimt The Girlfriends	1916–17	1945	Schloss Immendorf fire	Formerly Lederer family collection, Vienna. Color images survive
Klimt Leda	1917	1945	Schloss Immendorf fire	Formerly Lederer family collection, Vienna
Klimt Gastein	1917	1945	Schloss Immendorf fire	
Shrady, Henry Robert E. Lee equestrian statue	1924	2023	City council was offended (it had been a focal point of the Unite the Right rally) and had it removed	Stood in Charlottesville, Virginia. Removed from its pedestal in 2021, and wilfully destroyed by melting in unspecified location two years later
Monet Water Lilies (major study)	1925	1958	Museum of Modern Art (MoMA) fire	
Monet Water Lilies (small study)	1925	1961	Museum of Modern Art (MoMA) fire	
Rivera, Diego Man at the Crossroads mural	1933	1934	Rockefeller was offended (it included a portrait of Lenin) and had it removed	Nelson Rockefeller commissioned the work. Rivera later recreated the work as Man, Controller of the Universe in the Palacio de Bellas Artes in Mexico City.
Seligman, Hilda Bust of Haile Selassie	1936	2020	Vandalism linked to unrest in Ethiopia and persecution of the Oromo people	Originally located in the house in Wimbledon, London where Selassie lived in exile; moved to nearby Cannizaro Park in 1957
Miró The Reaper	1937	1937	Sent to Valencia and presumably destroyed	Created for the Spanish Republican pavilion of the 1937 Paris Exposition. Photographs of the installed mural exist
Dalí The Seven Lively Arts	1944	1956	Fire	A series of seven paintings for Billy Rose. Known only from photographs
Gorky, Arshile Works housed in his studio	1940–1946	1946	Arshile Gorky Studio Fire	
Gorky, Arshile 15 Works	1940–1946	1962	American Airlines Flight 1 plane crash	
Hopper, Edward Corn Belt City	1947	1975	Park Avenue apartment fire	
Sutherland, Graham Portrait of Winston Churchill	1954	1954	Destroyed by the Churchills' private secretary	Color photographs survive
Picasso Works for the documentary The Mystery of Picasso	1956	1956	Created on camera and then destroyed	
Picasso Cubist Head	1909-1912	1978	Museum of Modern Art, Rio de Janeiro fire	
Picasso Portrait of Dora Maar	1937	1978	Museum of Modern Art, Rio de Janeiro fire	
Kauffman, Craig Untitled Wall Relief, an acrylic lacquer on Plexiglas piece	1967	2006	Fell and shattered at the Pompidou Center of Paris	
Nabel-Bochenek, Danuta, Łaskawski, Kazimierz American Astronauts Memorial	1969	1969	Removed and destroyed	
Alexander, Peter Untitled piece, molded polyester resin work	1971	2006	Fell and shattered at the Pompidou Center of Paris	
Calder, Alexander World Trade Center Stabile	1971	2001	World Trade Center Collapse	
Nagare, Masayuki World Trade Center Plaza Sculpture	1972	2001	World Trade Center Collapse	Survived the initial collapse of the buildings, and was destroyed during cleanup.
Miró, Joan, Josep Royo World Trade Center Tapestry	1973	2001	World Trade Center Collapse	Hung in the South Tower Lobby
Lichtenstein, Roy One painting from The Entablature Series	1971–72 or 1974–1976	2001	World Trade Center Collapse	
Rosati, James Ideogram	1974	2001	World Trade Center Collapse	
Nevelson, Louise Sky Gate, New York	1978	2001	World Trade Center Collapse	
Budd, Kenneth Chartist Mural	1978	2013	Redevelopment	A 115 by 12 feet mosaic mural in Newport, Wales
Pearl Monument	1982	2011	Torn down by the government after becoming a focal point for protesters	Stood in the center of the Pearl Roundabout, Bahrain
Central Academy of Fine Arts students Goddess of Democracy	1989	1989	Destroyed by People's Liberation Army during Tiananmen Square protests	
Whiteread, Rachel "House" temporary sculpture	1993	1994	Removed by London Borough of Tower Hamlets council on 11 January	
Picasso The Painter	1901–1973	1998	Swissair Flight 111 Plane Crash	
Emin, Tracey Everyone I Have Ever Slept With 1963–1995 ("The Tent")	1995	2004	Momart fire	
Serra, Richard Tilted Arc	1981	1989	Dismantled and removed	
Heatherwick, Thomas B of the Bang	2005	2009	Dismantled	Parts remain in storage
Prymachenko, Maria Works of folk art		2022	2022 Russian Invasion of Ukraine	In the Ivankiv Historical and Local History Museum

== See also ==
- Art discovery
- List of missing treasures
- Lost film
- Lost literary work
- List of destroyed heritage
- List of destroyed libraries
- List of monuments and memorials removed during the George Floyd protests
