= Lost work =

A lost work is a work that is known about, but no longer exists, or cannot be found.

== Types ==
- Lost literary work, where the text is unknown
- Lost artworks, of visual art, which may be known through copies
- Lost media, audiovisual media such as films, television and radio broadcasts, music, and video games
  - Lost film
  - Lost television broadcast

== See also ==
- Lost city
