= Equal-Parallel/Guernica-Bengasi =

Sculpture by Richard Serra

- Artist: Richard Serra
- Year: 1986
- Medium: Sculpture
- Location: Reina Sofia Museum, Madrid, Spain
- Website: Webpage

Equal-Parallel/Guernica-Bengasi is a sculpture created by the American artist Richard Serra. Originally created in 1986 for the Reina Sofia Museum, the sculpture was put into storage in 1988. In 2006, the museum admitted that it had lost the sculpture and had no idea where it was. Serra created a replica sculpture which is currently on display in the museum.

== History ==
The sculpture was commissioned by the Reina Sofia Museum for the exhibition "Referencias: Un encuentro artístico en el tiempo" ("References: An artistic encounter in time"), which took place between 26 May and 15 September 1986. Serra was paid $200,000 for the art work, which weighed 38 tonnes. In March 1988, the sculpture was placed into storage with the company Fluiters S.A., who specialized in the storage of works of art. In November 1990, the sculpture was taken out of storage and placed back on display briefly. On 25 November 1990, the sculpture was placed back into storage with the company Macarrón S.A.. According to museum documentation, the sculpture was still in storage until 1992.

In October 2005, the museum director, Ana Martínez de Aguilar wanted to display the sculpture and found that it could not be located. The company it had been stored with had gone into receivership in 1998 and the sculpture could not be accounted for. The Spanish newspaper ABC speculated that the sculpture may have been sold for scrap metal.

In 2006 the museum made a deal with Serra to create a replica of the original. In 2009, the replica was reinstated in the museum and is currently exhibited.

== See also ==
- Lost artworks
