= San Giovanni Evangelista, Ravenna =

Church in Ravenna, Italy

Coordinates: 44.417904°N 12.205526°E

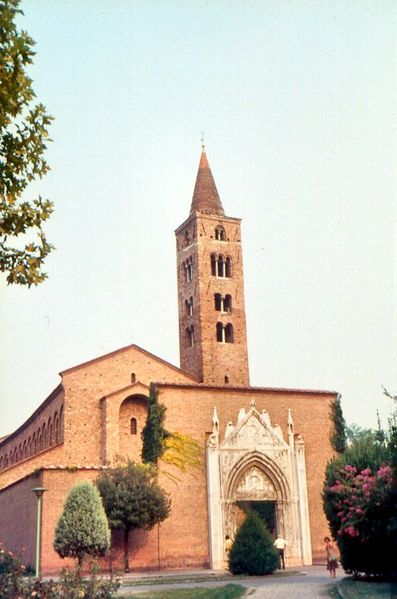
The church of San Giovanni Evangelista.

San Giovanni Evangelista is a church in Ravenna, Italy.

It was built in the fifth century AD by the Roman imperial princess Galla Placidia "in fulfilment of a vow made by her to S. John Evangelist, when, on her way from Constantinople to Ravenna, she was in danger of shipwreck. Agnellus tells us that of old the church bore an inscription to this effect, and he gives it to us: Sancto ac Beatissimo Apostolo Johanni Evangelistae Galla Placidia Augusta cum filio suo Placidio Valentiniano Augusto et filia sua Justa Grata Honoria Augusta, Liberationis periculum maris votum solvientes. The mosaic of the apse of old represented the incident. Unhappily the church was almost entirely rebuilt in 1747, only the tower of the eleventh century and the portico of the fourteenth being left as they had been."

In the Middle Ages the Benedictines annexed to it an important monastery. Two of the four bells date to 1208. In the 14th century both the church and the monastery were renovated in the Gothic style: of that intervention the portal is visible today. In 1747 the church was almost entirely stripped of its mosaics; the only two remaining fragments of the original 5th-century floor record the first Christian use of hooked crosses. Heavily bombed during World War II, the building was later restored. Other mosaic fragments found surviving the WWII bombing belong to the 13th-century floor and depict the Fourth Crusade.

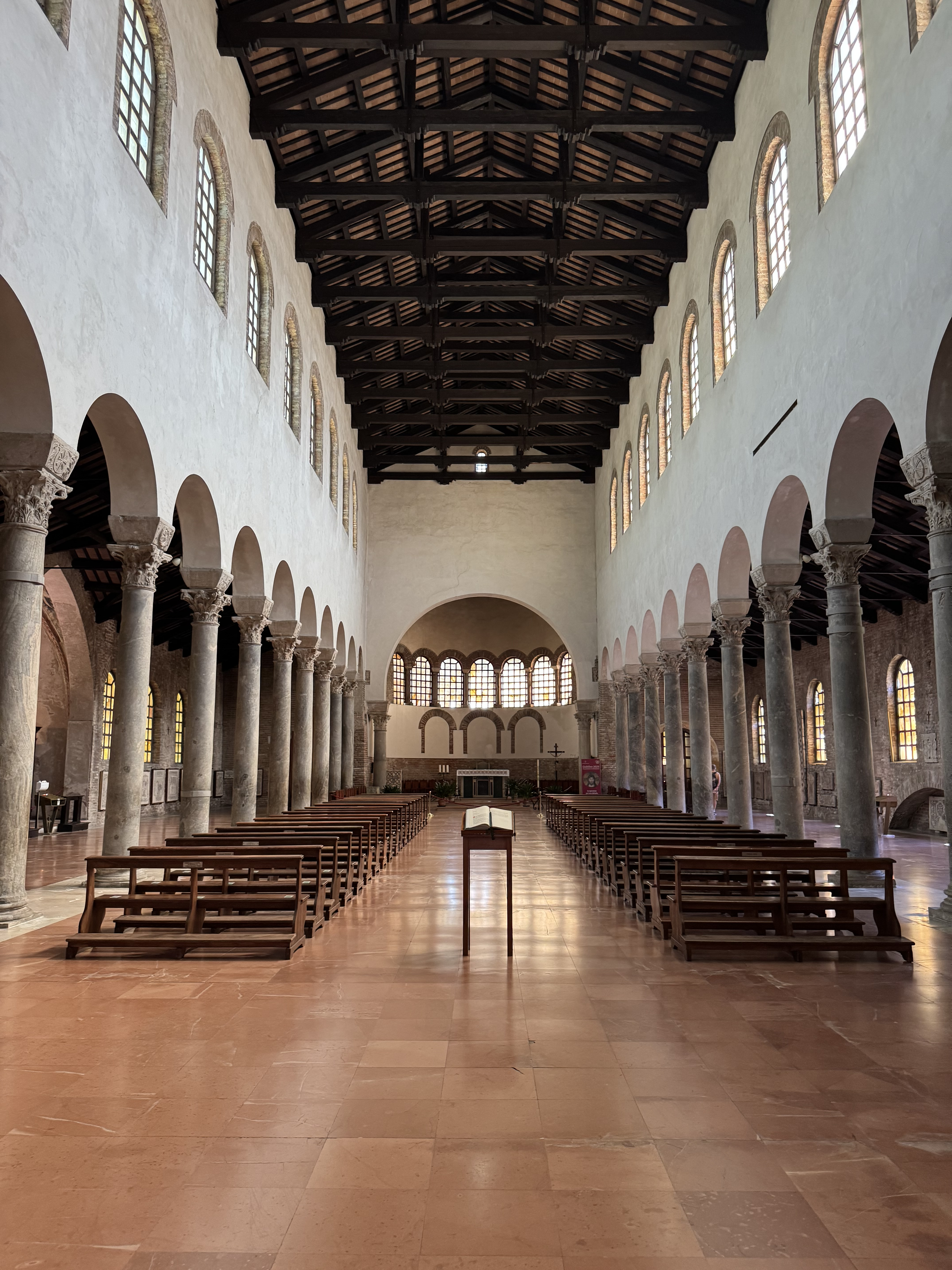
Interior view facing the apse and the altar.

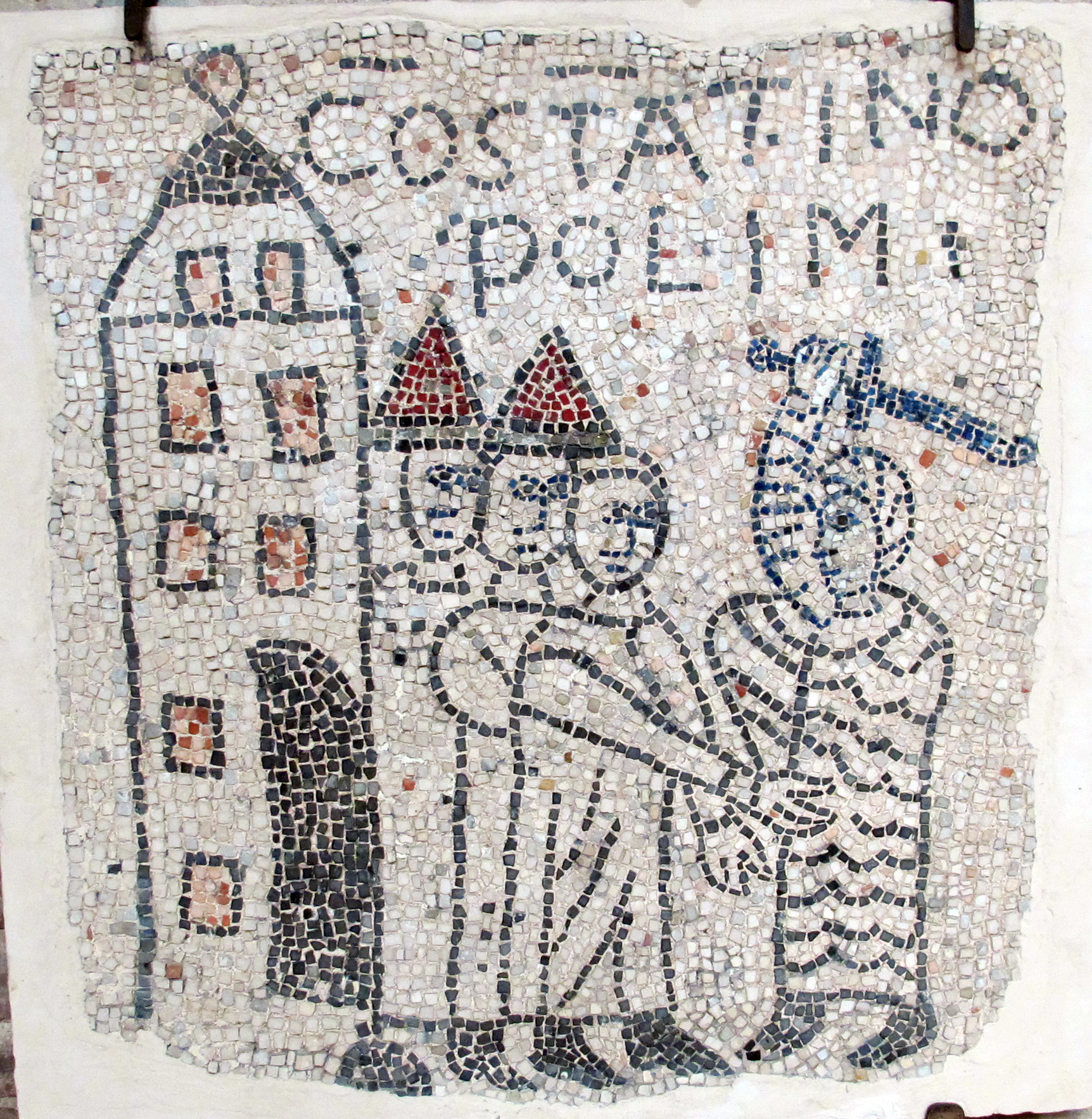
Venetian mosaic in San Giovanni Evangelista depicting the fall of Constantinople, made in 1213
