= The Jester Barbarroja =

Painting by Diego Velázquez

- El bufón Barbarroja (Spanish)
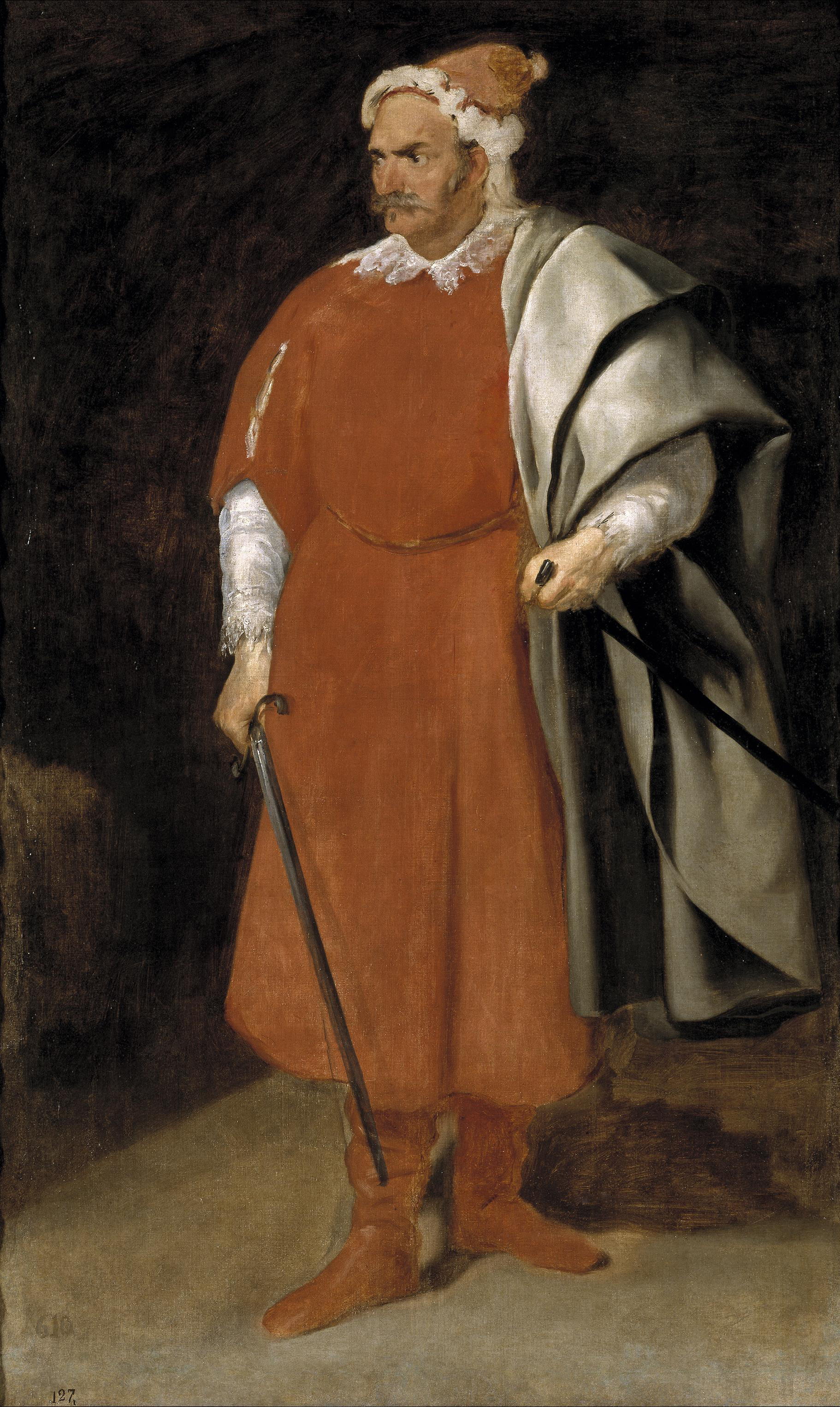
- Artist: Diego Velázquez
- Year: 1637–1640
- Medium: Oil on canvas
- Dimensions: 200 cm × 121.5 cm (79 in × 47.8 in)
- Location: Museo del Prado; Madrid

The Jester Barbarroja (El bufón Barbarroja) is an oil on canvas portrait by Diego Velázquez of Cristóbal de Castañeda y Pernia, nicknamed Barbarroja in his role as a jester at the court of Philip IV of Spain from 1633 to 1649. The painting is now in the Museo del Prado. It was in the Palacio del Buen Retiro in Madrid in 1701, one of six portraits of court jesters in the Queen's quarters (two of which, The Jester Francesco de Ochoa and Cardenas the Toreador, are missing). From 1816 to 1827 it was in the Real Academia de Bellas Artes de San Fernando.

The composition's subject also served Cardinal-Infante Ferdinand of Austria, for whom he played Barbarroja (Barbarossa) in comic plays. He was later banished from the court, to Seville, by the Duke of Olivares for a reply he gave the king when asked whether there were olives in the Segovian town of Valsaín - to this, the jester punningly replied "Sir, neither olives nor Olivares".

== See also ==
- List of works by Diego Velázquez

== Bibliography ==
- Museo del Prado. Pintura española de los siglos XVI y XVII. Enrique Lafuente Ferrari. Aguilar S.A. 1964
