= Beach in Pourville =

1882 painting by Claude Monet

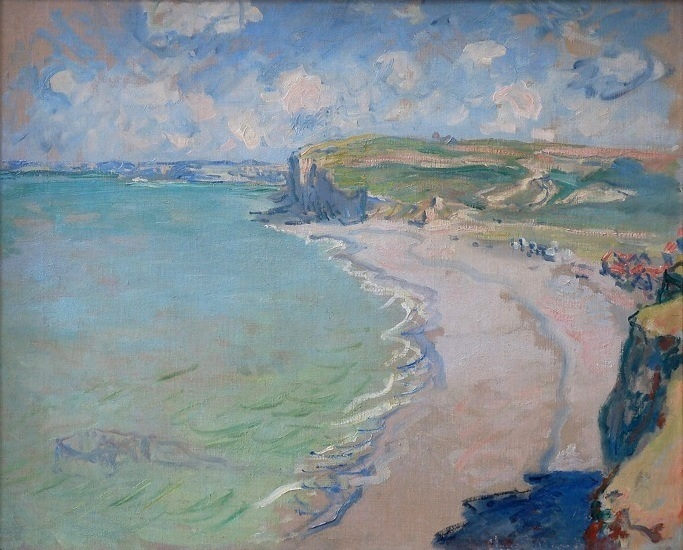
- Artist: Claude Monet
- Year: 1882
- Medium: Oil on canvas
- Location: National Museum, Poznań; Poland

Beach in Pourville (title in French: La plage à Pourville, soleil couchant) is a painting by French artist Claude Monet. It is one of an 1882 series of oil-on-canvas works by Monet in the small seaside resort of Pourville-sur-Mer (now part of the commune of Hautot-sur-Mer), near Dieppe in northern France. Monet is considered one of the most important members of the group of painters identified as the Impressionists. The painting was bought by the National Museum, Poznań, Poland, in 1906 and exhibited in the display of their collection.

== Theft and recovery ==
The painting was stolen from the Poznań National Museum in September 2000. It was cut out of its frame and replaced with a copy, which had been painted on cardboard. At the time, the painting was valued at more than $1 million, and was the only painting by Monet on public display in Poland. The theft was discovered on 19 September 2000, and police searched for a man who had been seen making sketches of paintings in the museum two days earlier.

The painting was recovered on 12 January 2010. Police also arrested a 41-year-old man in the southern Polish city of Olkusz, whom they believe to be the painter of the copy used in the robbery. The suspect was traced through fingerprints and other evidence left at the site of the theft.

== See also ==
- List of paintings by Claude Monet

== See also ==
- Art theft
