= 1993 World Trade Center Bombing Memorial =

Destroyed memorial in New York City

1993 World Trade Center Bombing Memorial Fountain
- The memorial as it appeared from the air
- Artist: Elyn Zimmerman
- Completion date: 1995
- Condition: Destroyed on September 11, 2001

The 1993 World Trade Center Bombing Memorial was created to commemorate the six lives lost during the February 26, 1993, bombing of the World Trade Center in New York City. The memorial was commissioned by the Port Authority of New York & New Jersey Art Commission after the events of the bombing, and completed in 1995. It was placed directly above the bomb's blast site—the public parking garage beneath the World Trade Center—and situated squarely between the Twin Towers in what was the Austin J. Tobin Plaza on the grounds of the World Trade Center complex. The Memorial, along with other valuable sculptures and pieces of artwork, was destroyed during the September 11 attacks in 2001.

== Inspiration and design ==
Designed by Elyn Zimmerman, the memorial and its surroundings were intentionally made to resemble a bullseye when observed from a bird's-eye view, as it was situated directly above the ground zero site of the bombing, between One World Trade Center and the Marriott World Trade Center Hotel.

The interior of the fountain had purposely cracked, white granite walls that evoked the appearance of ancient tumulus markers—mounds of earth raised over graves. In explaining her creative process in designing the walls, Zimmerman notes,

"Stone has cultural references as monuments and tumulus mounds. I didn't feel intimidated by that; rather, I felt it adds dignity to a work. [...] I went back to some of the books I had looked at and thought of these tumulus mounds and how from time immemorial, people captured the experience of passage, entombing people who were important in their culture. They would do it in these mound-like structures. Very early on you had things like Stonehenge and those kinds of mound structures. But around the first millennium BC, you get not just mounds of earth but actual constructions of cut stone mixed in with rubble and earth. I was inspired by these. I was also attracted to their minimalist form. I came out of a period in the art world when there was a strong influence of Minimalism. I found these forms very powerful, very engaging. They're iconic. That's what I began to think about, and I developed the World Trade Center form. It has a combination of very rough white granite that's broken into large chunks forming the walls, and it's topped and finished and held in place by polished granite pieces."

The walls enclosed a shallow pool that collected water flowing from a hole in the fountain's central red granite drum. Zimmerman further notes,

"The underlying idea was that there would be an inscription of some sort. I decided to try to make a form that might bring people closer to it. In order to read the inscription, they'd have to walk up to it and look inside."

=== Inscription ===
All of the Memorial's inscriptions were arranged circumferentially. The chief inscription etched into the red granite of the memorial read:

" On February 26, 1993, a bomb set by terrorists exploded below this site. This horrible act of violence killed innocent people, injured thousands, and made victims of us all."

Out of respect for the families of victims Wilfredo Mercado and Monica Rodriguez Smith, Zimmerman included a Spanish translation of the corresponding inscription, found directly below its English counterpart. The names of each of the six victims, all World Trade Center employees, were also etched into the fountain.

== Destruction and legacy ==
The fountain was destroyed with the rest of the World Trade Center during the September 11 attacks. After assessing the destruction of the memorial, along with the rest of the World Trade Center complex, only a single fragment of the inscribed granite marked "John D", from the name of John DiGiovanni, was found intact at Ground Zero. The fragment was later incorporated into a temporary memorial designed by Port Authority architect Jacqueline Hanley, and erected on the Liberty Street side of the site following the September 11 attacks. The memorial was visible across a fence barrier but was not open to the public. After the completion of the permanent memorial, the temporary memorial was dismantled. The fountain fragment is currently located at the National September 11 Memorial & Museum.

The remainder of the fountain was never recovered, and any of its remains were removed from Ground Zero along with the rest of the rubble.

The names of the victims are now displayed on Panel N-73 at the North Pool's National September 11 Memorial & Museum.

On September 8, 2026, a Port Authority Employee Memorial for the 1993 bombing and 9/11 attacks was installed at Liberty Park, which includes a replica of the red marble ring and inscriptions from the 1993 World Trade Center Bombing Memorial.

== Gallery ==
Onlookers viewing the original memorial.

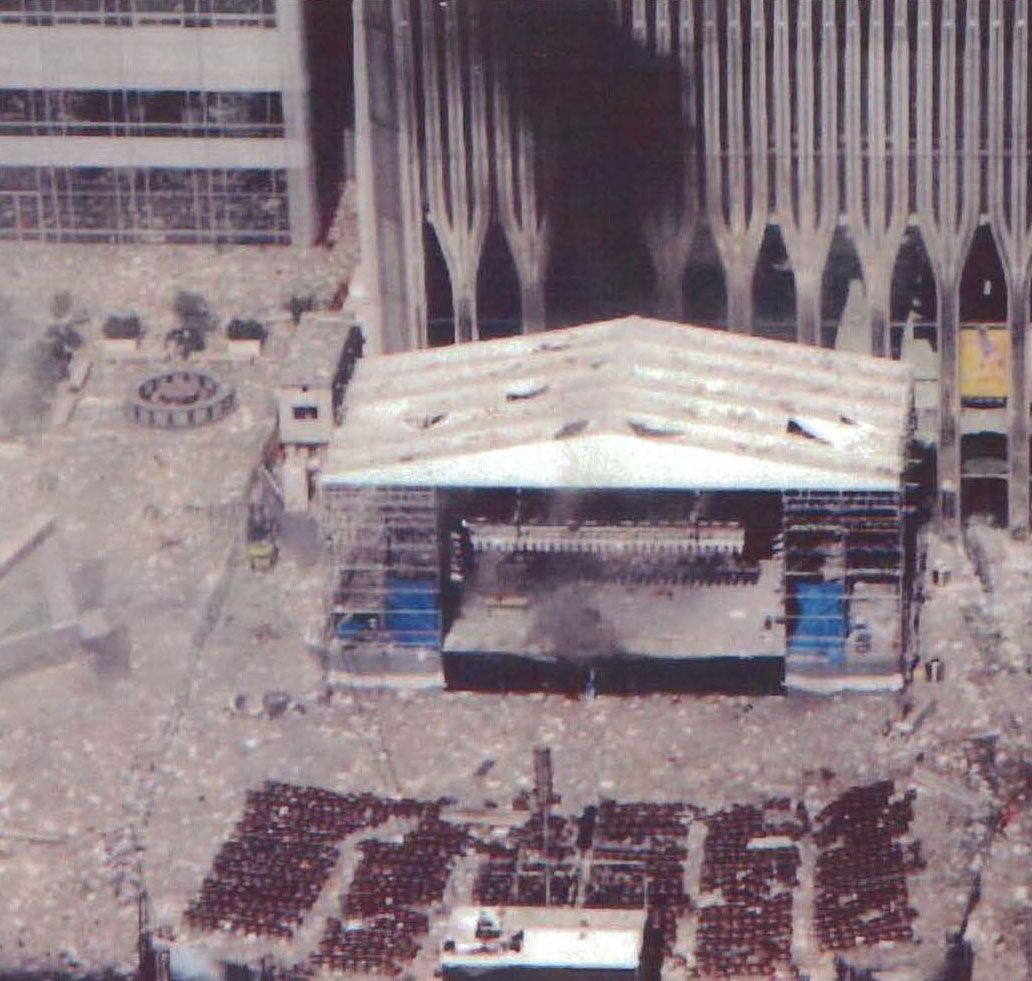
One of the last known photographs of the original memorial, seen below the Marriott Hotel on the left, during the September 11 attacks. At the center of the photo is a temporary concert stage.

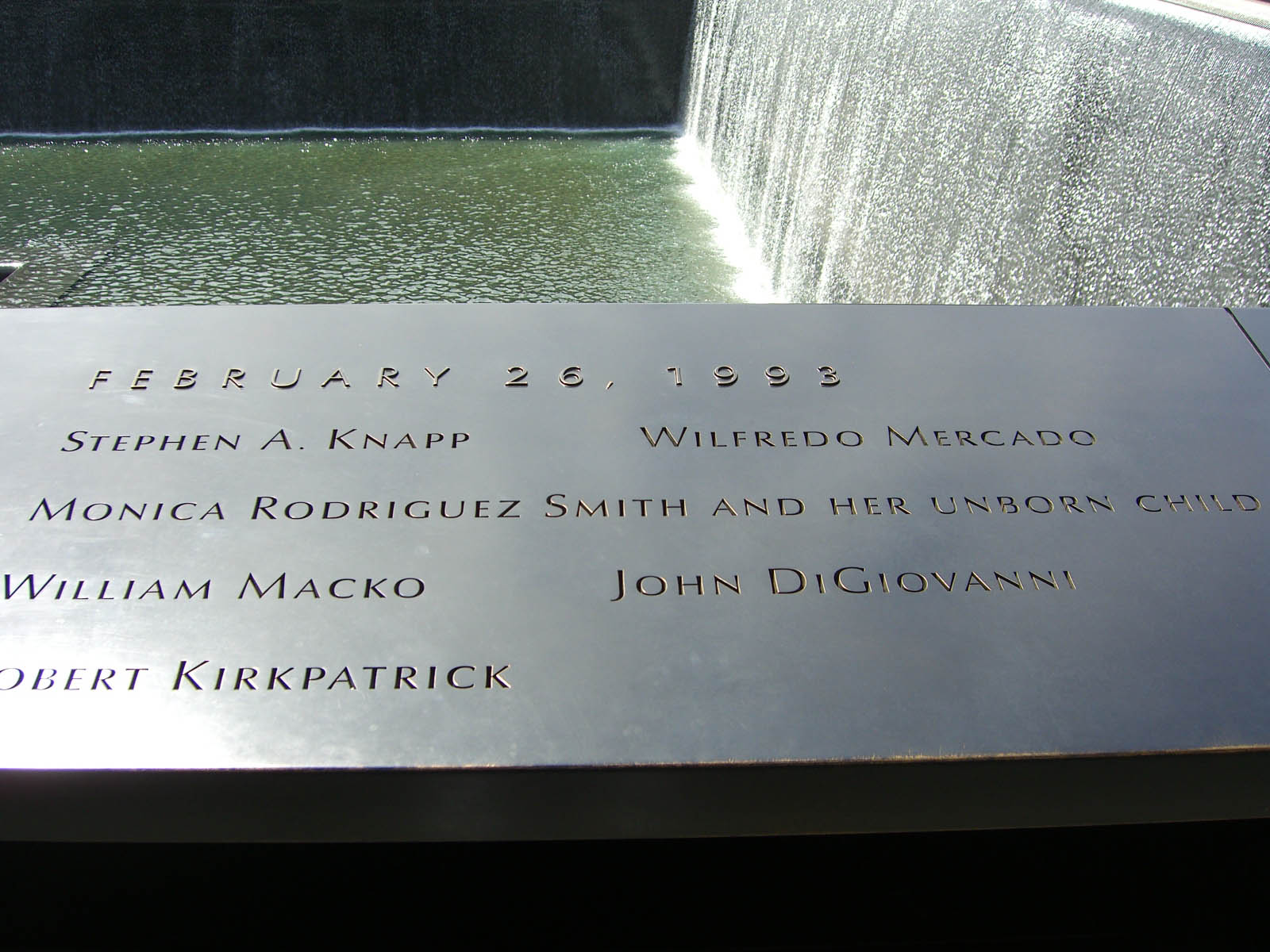
The names of the victims on the Reflecting Absence memorial, located at the North Pool.

== See also ==
- Artwork at the World Trade Center (1973–2001)
- Artwork damaged or destroyed in the September 11 attacks
- Ideogram (sculpture)
- The Sphere
- Bent Propeller
- National September 11 Memorial & Museum
