= Windless (song) =

2023 single by Mike Strickland

"Windless (Dedication)"

Single by Mike Strickland

from the album Windless (Dedication)
- Released: September 11, 2023
- Recorded: 1996
- Genre: Ambient music
- Length: 4:34
- Label: Mike Strickland Productions
- Songwriter: Mike Strickland

Music video
- "Windless (Dedication)" on YouTube

"Windless" is a song written and recorded by Mike Strickland. It was originally made as a proprietary title listing for Muzak somewhere in 1996, but did not see a public release until September 11, 2023. It was released as Windless (Dedication) in memory of the lives lost during the September 11 attacks.

== Production ==
The song was produced by Mike Strickland in 1996 for Muzak, for use on their music systems. It was originally titled "On the Wind", but was changed to "Windless" to give Muzak a proprietary title listing. In 1998, Strickland released a finalized version of the melody, with the title On the Wind; the same title that was initially meant for Windless.

At the time, Strickland had only released Windless publicly for Muzak.

== September 11 ==
On the morning of September 11, Muzak's Environmental Music System was still playing under the overhangs of 4 and 5 World Trade Center on the Austin J. Tobin Plaza during the attacks. Windless could be heard somewhere around 9:32 AM right after a rendition of She's Always a Woman, while both the North Tower and South Tower of the World Trade Center were burning, as observed in footage recorded by Jack Taliercio close to the plaza. However, the song was not very audible due to the chaos and debris falling, making it hard to identify.

Talierico later described the Muzak playing from the plaza as giving him a "bizarre, surreal feeling", as he was hearing all sorts of music while there was destruction around him.

== Recovery ==
In 2023, Mike Strickland was messaged by "a group of Gen Zs archiving the Muzak of the Twin Towers" that had played during the attacks, after one of the group its members, named W4SP online, had listened to a song of his, "Lizabeth's Lullaby", that had a "similar feeling" to Windless. The group had initially had named the song "Ice Cream" as a tentative name.

The member had sent Strickland a email with the footage that contained the song from September 11. He had originally forgotten entirely about the song; his wife initially listened to the audio, but couldn't tell if it was his song or not. She then had Strickland listen to the song on the footage, to which he recognized it as one of his own songs. Strickland initially recognized it as On the Wind, which he released in 1998. However, he then noticed it was "not quite the right song", due to how certain things were different like where the saxophones made an entrance, specifically from a 9th interval where he goes into a sax solo. He and W4SP then realized there must have been another version that existed of On the Wind. Strickland stopped exchanging emails after that, as he was reaching around to other people which he was working with around that time about the song.

The group also had a internal disagreement on whether to contact Jack Taliercio about the song, with some members having concerns about him not taking it well if they asked about it. Eventually, someone commented that they had identified music audible in his footage on Taliercio's Facebook page, to which Taliercio responded with a sad-face emoji. Upon hearing the footage with the song, Taliercio initially believed that it had been added to the footage later, rather than being ambient music from the World Trade Center's Muzak system. The group that was searching for these songs had feared the track was added to the footage later after this statement, and that they were searching for a so called red herring-song; Talierico revisited his own footage of the event, and confirmed that the piano keys that were heard were actually in the footage and not later added in. In a interview, he additionally expressed that "the interest in the project may be greater than what they imagine", due to it being music that played repeatedly daily and weekly for both those working and visiting the towers.

Strickland's final halt in communication was because he was waiting on a response from an old producer of his to contact him back; eventually, W4SP sent a follow-up email to Strickland, telling him "You wouldn’t believe how many people are waiting for this song.". This gave Strickland a new determination to find the song.

Strickland went searching in his attic's music archives for the song out of curiosity. The second digital audio tape he had picked "out of 60+ tapes" contained Windless; he then proceeded to send the song to the group. Windless was then uploaded to YouTube as a unofficial release in April of 2023.

== Release ==
Strickland officially released the song as a single on September 11, 2023. Its title was changed to Windless (Dedication), in memory of "the beautiful souls that lost their lives that day" 22 years prior. Strickland described his song its original title and its actual title with Muzak as being "quite ironic", due to the song playing shortly prior to the collapse of the World Trade Center.
