= Bench-Stone =

Public art work by Masayuki Nagare

Coordinates: 43°10′35.6″N 87°56′14.6″W

- Artist: Masayuki Nagare
- Year: 1965
- Type: granite
- Location: Lynden Sculpture Garden; Milwaukee, Wisconsin
- Owner: Bradley Family Foundation

Bench-Stone is a public art work by modernist Japanese artist Masayuki Nagare located at the Lynden Sculpture Garden near Milwaukee, Wisconsin. The sculpture is an abstract, rectangular form lying horizontally with a shallow concave spherical depression on the top and installed on the lawn.
