= World Trade Center Plaza Sculpture =

Sculpture by Masayuki Nagare

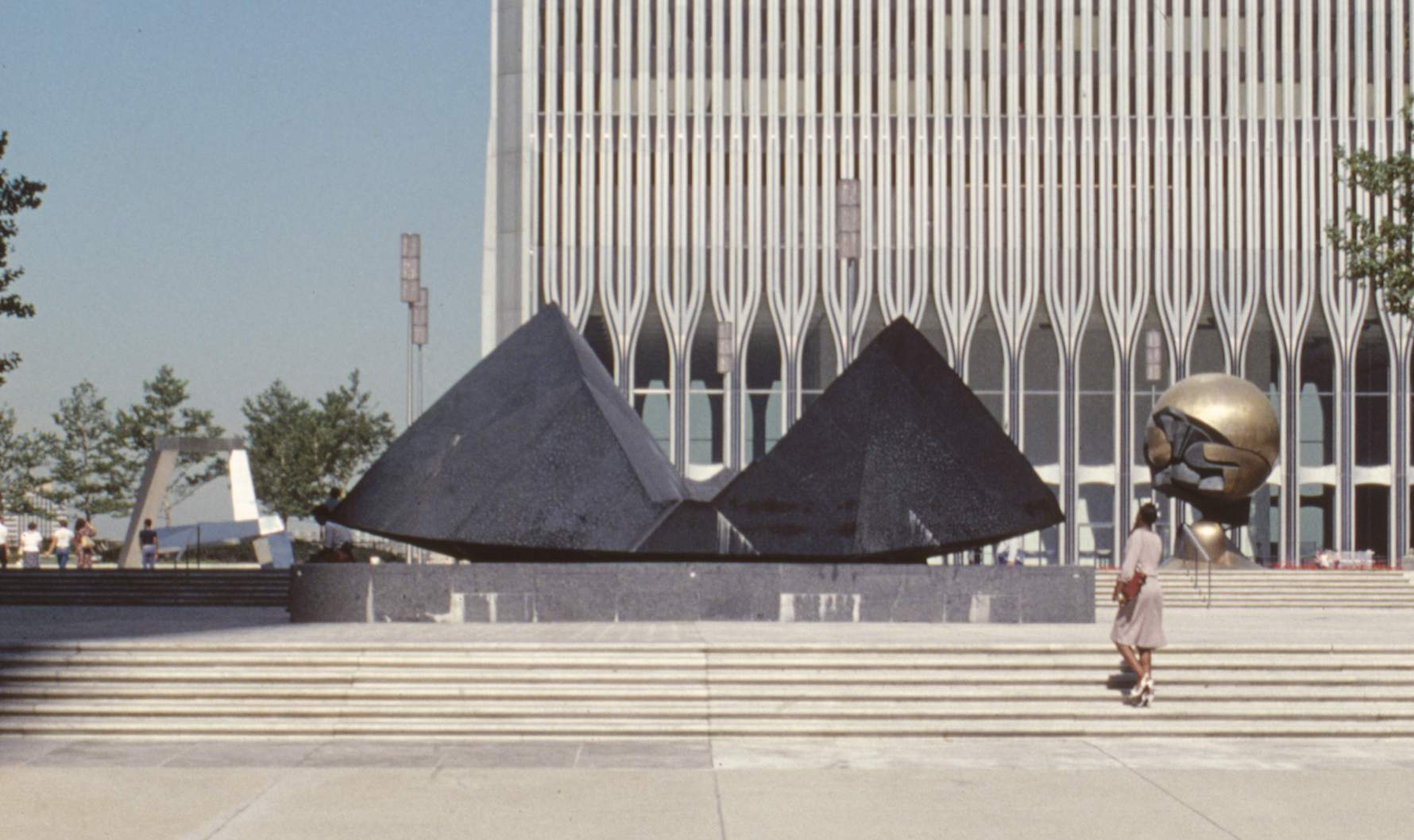
- The sculpture in 1976 with The Sphere visible on the right. Ideogram is on the left.
- Artist: Masayuki Nagare
- Year: 1972–2001
- Dimensions: 4.3 m × 10 m × 5.2 m (14 ft × 34 ft × 17 ft)
- Condition: Destroyed during the cleanup

World Trade Center Plaza Sculpture (Cloud Fortress) by Masayuki Nagare, photographed in 1982.

The World Trade Center Plaza Sculpture, also called Cloud Fortress, was a sculpture created by Japanese artist Masayuki Nagare in 1975. It was located at the World Trade Center complex at the Church Street entrance to the Austin J. Tobin Plaza.

Having survived the September 11 attacks, the sculpture was demolished during subsequent emergency efforts to access and clear the site.

== Design ==
Measuring 14 feet (4.3 m) tall, 34 feet (10 m) wide, and 17 feet (5.2 m) deep, Cloud Fortress was completed in 1975 and depicted an abstraction of two pyramids attached at their bases and tilted upward. Although appearing solid, the work consisted of a veneer of black Swedish granite (gabbro) over a steel and concrete armature.

Nagare incorporated a technique he called 'ware hada', literally cracked skin or broken texture, to feature contrasting polished and rough faces.

== History ==
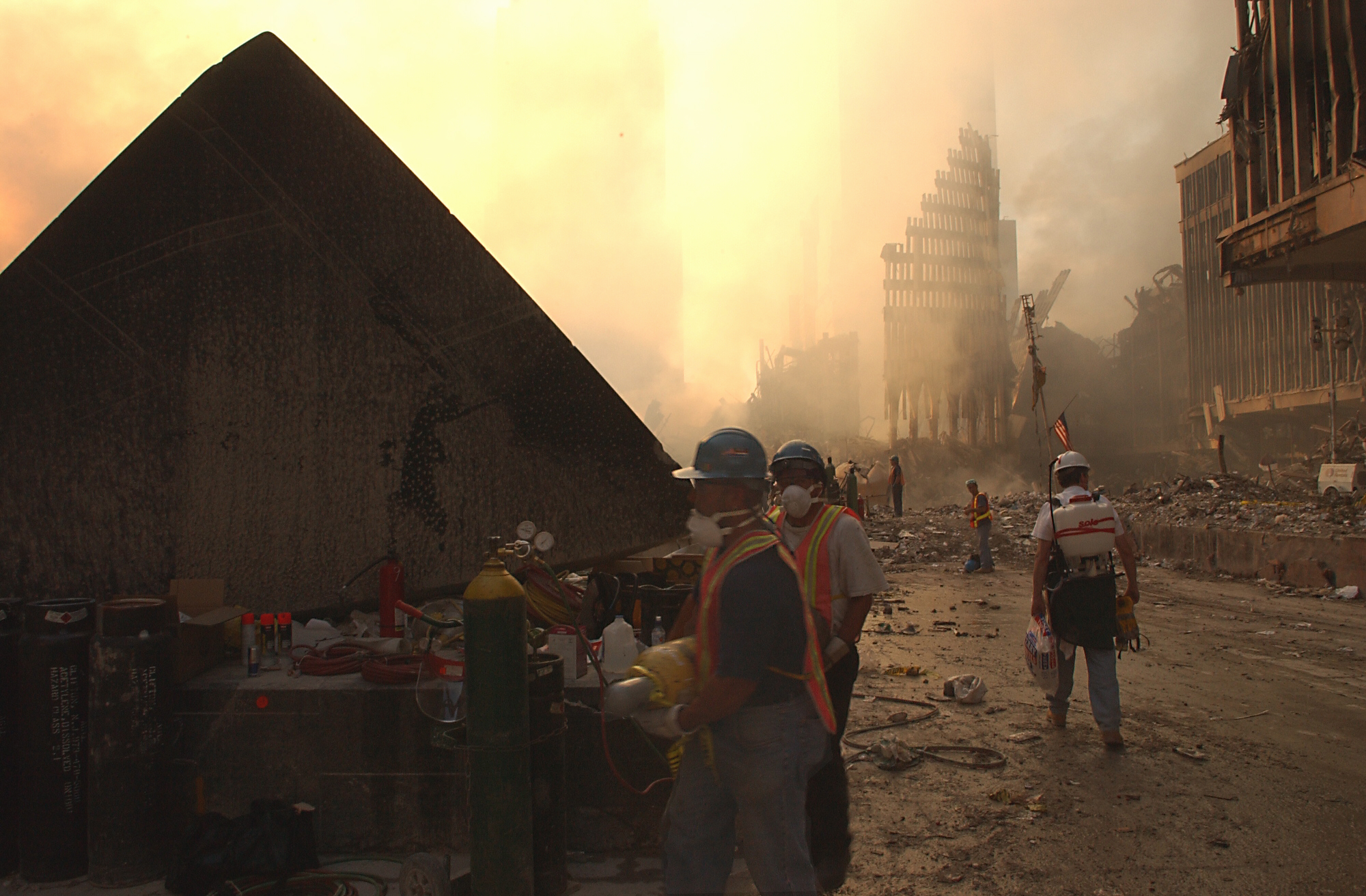
The sculpture amidst the ruins of Ground Zero. Image taken before the sculpture's demolition.

The Port Authority allocated up to 1% of the World Trade Center construction cost to the purchase of art for the complex, and established an advisory group to recommend and commission artwork.

Completed in 1975, Cloud Fortress occupied a minor plaza between buildings 4 and 5 that gave access from Church Street to the large Austin J. Tobin Plaza central to the complex of World Trade Center buildings.

The sculpture survived the immediate attacks and collapse of the adjacent buildings, but was demolished several days later by emergency efforts to access and clear the site and provide a stable area for heavy machinery to further access Austin J. Tobin Plaza. Following the sculpture's demolition, its remains were removed from Ground Zero along with the rest of the rubble. None of its remains have been identified or recovered since.

In 2004, Nagare created a one-half sized replica and named it Cloud Fortress Jr. ("雲の砦Jr."). It is on display at Hokkaido Museum of Modern Art.

== See also ==
- Artwork damaged or destroyed in the September 11 attacks
