= Austin J. Tobin Plaza =

Public square in New York City (1966–2001)

- Public square
- World Trade Center Plaza, Tobin Plaza
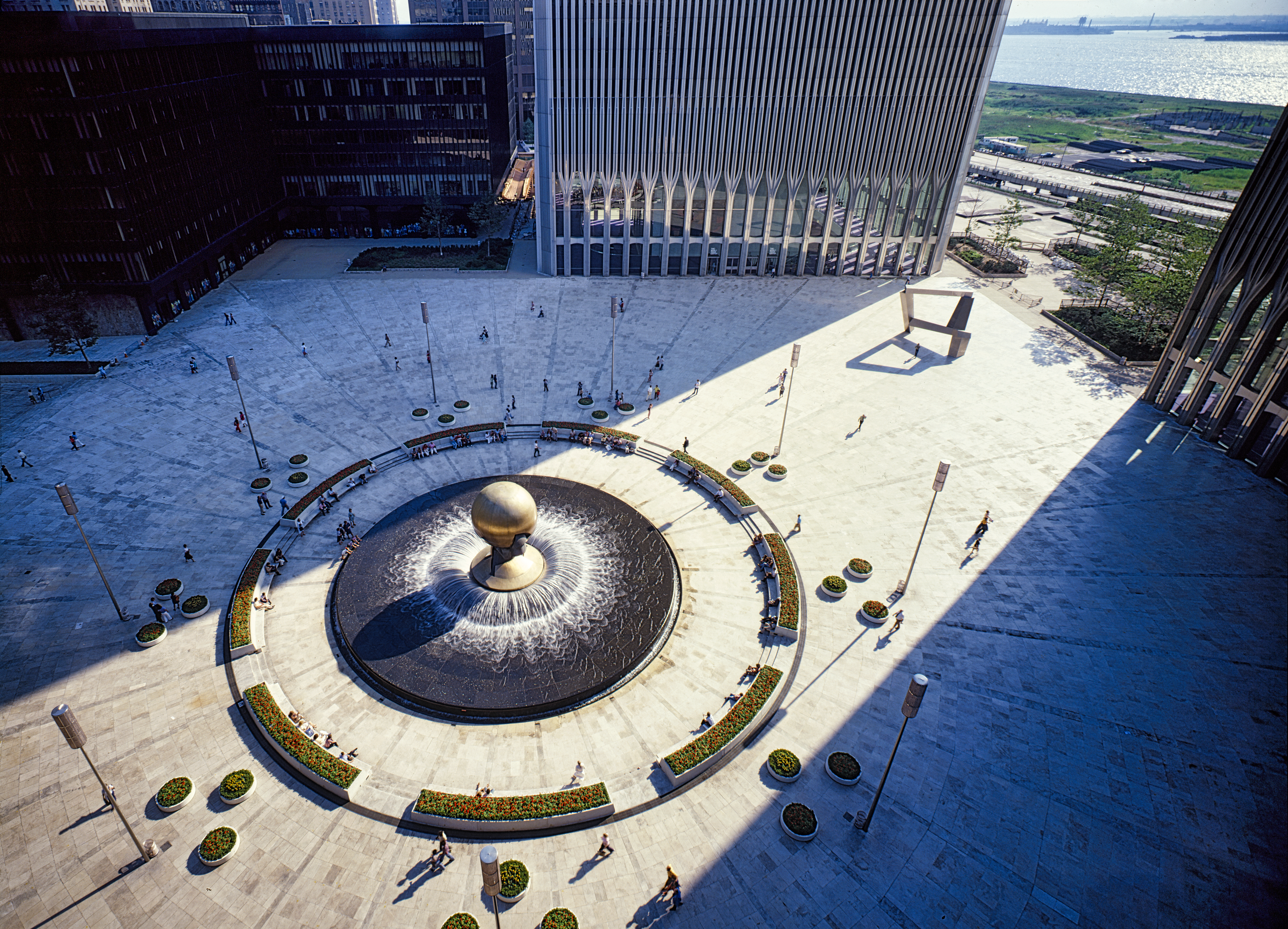
- The plaza, as seen in 1976. The Sphere can be seen at the center of the plaza, and Ideogram is visible to the upper right, located between 1 and 2 World Trade Center.
- Design: Minoru Yamasaki
- Constructed: 1966
- Completed: 1973
- Opened: April 4, 1973
- Destroyed: September 11, 2001
- Cost: $12 million (1999 USD)
- Area: 5 acres (2.0 ha)
- Dedicated to: Austin J. Tobin
- Owner: Port Authority of New York and New Jersey
- Location: World Trade Center, Lower Manhattan, New York City, U.S.
- Interactive map of Austin J. Tobin Plaza
- Coordinates: 40°42′42″N 74°00′45″W

The Austin J. Tobin Plaza, also known as the World Trade Center Plaza, was a large elevated public square that was located within the World Trade Center site in Lower Manhattan, New York City, from 1966 until its destruction during the September 11 attacks in 2001. It covered 5 acres (220,000 sq ft; 2.0 ha), making it the largest plaza in New York City by acreage at the time.

The plaza opened as part of the original World Trade Center on April 4, 1973, and was renamed after Austin J. Tobin in 1982. Several sculptures were located there, including The Sphere and Ideogram. The plaza was damaged during the 1993 World Trade Center bombing and destroyed eight years later during the September 11 terrorist attacks, which saw over 1,000,000,000 pounds (450,000,000 kg) of debris fall onto the plaza's floor.

== Design and location ==
At the center of the plaza was The Sphere, and rows of benches were arranged in a circular pattern around the sculpture. The plaza was made of smooth marble and granite. The plaza was landscaped, and flowerbeds located near the benches were changed out seasonally. Muzak was regularly played throughout the plaza, being added in 1998 and piped under the overhangs of Buildings 4 & 5. A total of 37 staircases led up to the plaza, and a staircase that led up to the plaza from Vesey Street was used to get to the plaza from 7 World Trade Center.

Bird's-eye view of the World Trade Center site plan. The plaza covered a majority of the complex.

Another building, designed by architectural firm Walker & Gillette, was to be built on the eastern edge of the plaza, but was later cancelled due to sizing issues. Director Gary Beck called the plaza a "naturally perfect performing site" and "accidentally one of the best in America". Author Virginia Dajani also gave remarks on the plaza, stating that it was "considerably larger than the Piazza San Marco in Venice and infinitely less memorable".

The plaza was surrounded by all seven buildings of the World Trade Center Complex. 1 World Trade Center was located on the west-facing side of the plaza adjacent to West Street and 2 World Trade Center was located on the south side of the plaza. Marriott World Trade Center (also known as 3 World Trade Center) was located on the southwestern corner of the plaza in between the towers.

4 World Trade Center, adjacent to the South Tower, was positioned on the southeastern edge of the plaza bounded by Liberty and Church streets. 5 World Trade Center was located directly opposite of 4, bounded by Church and Vesey Street, and 6 World Trade Center was located on the northwestern edge of the plaza bounded by Vesey Street.

7 World Trade Center was located on an adjacent street, and was connected to the plaza via the Vesey Street stairs. The World Financial Center (now known as Brookfield Place) was also adjacent to the plaza's west side. The Millennium Downtown New York Hotel, located on the corner of Fulton Street across the street from the eastern edge of the plaza, was heavily damaged in the September 11 attacks.

== History ==
In early 1961, the plan for the original World Trade Center was released to the public, and the site was to be located along the East River. Due to heavy backlash, that December the project was relocated to a 16-acre (700,000 sq ft; 6.5 ha) plot in Lower Manhattan. The plaza was brought into design in January 1964, when architect Minoru Yamasaki released a model for the complex at a press conference. The original plans called for a reflecting pool at the center of the plaza. In addition, the plaza would have been accessed through a single large entrance on Church Street to the east. By May 1966, the Port Authority of New York and New Jersey, the site's developer, had revised the plans for the plaza; there would be entrances on all four sides, as well as an 80-foot-wide (24 m) fountain at the center of the plaza.

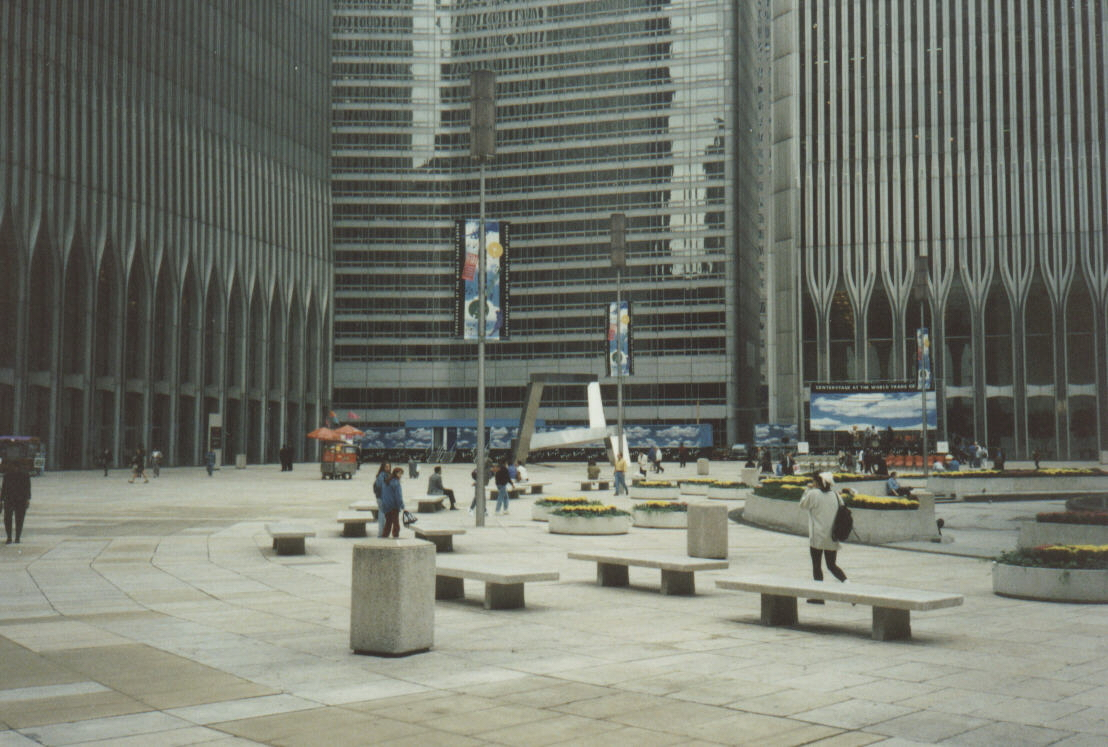
The Plaza in 1993

Development of the plaza began on August 5, 1966, as the construction of other buildings that were part of the World Trade Center took place. The plaza was constructed to be supported by large steel columns that reached into the "Bathtub" below, and the foundations for the towers were also built into the plaza; these foundations reached into the bedrock below. The Bathtub, which helped hold the plaza, took up an underground space that reached to the West Side Highway and the IRT Broadway–Seventh Avenue Line.

The plaza was inaugurated on April 4, 1973. In 1982, the Port Authority of New York and New Jersey decided to rename the plaza in honor of its former executive director, Austin J. Tobin, who promoted the construction of the towers.

The plaza was renovated between 1998 and 1999. The marble paving stones were replaced with gray and pink granite stones, new benches, planters, restaurants, muzak speakers, food kiosks and outdoor eating areas were added. Trees were also planted, and lined the plaza entrances. The total cost was $12 million (1999 USD). The plaza covered 5 acres (220,000 sq ft; 2.0 ha), and was the largest plaza in New York City. Below the plaza was the Mall at the World Trade Center and a concourse.

=== 1993 bombing ===
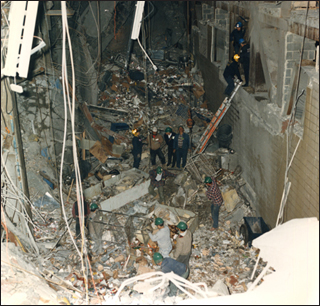
Aftermath of the 1993 bombing

On February 26, 1993, a van bomb planted by al-Qaeda terrorists was detonated in the underground garage directly under the plaza, killing six and injuring over 1,000. The plaza was heavily damaged, and the communications center near the plaza was destroyed. After the bombing, security was increased at the complex, and fire safety improvements were implemented.

On May 26, 1995, a memorial fountain made of granite was dedicated in the Plaza to honor the victims of the 1993 bombing. The fountain was designed by sculptor Elyn Zimmerman, and placed above the site of the explosion. It included an inscription with the names of the six victims of the attack, as well as a message that read: "On February 26, 1993, a bomb set by terrorists exploded below this site. This horrible act of violence killed innocent people, injured thousands, and made victims of us all."

== Security ==
The plaza was heavily monitored, and security cameras were placed on the rooftops of surrounding buildings to deter a potential terrorist attack. The cameras operated constantly, and more were installed facing the streets adjacent to the plaza. After the 1993 bombing, up to 300 security personnel were at the complex and plaza at any given time. Crowds would often gather in the plaza for various events, although security prevented people from sitting on planters in between the benches that circled the plaza.

== Sculptures ==
Located on the plaza were several sculptures and art pieces. The World Trade Center Plaza Sculpture, designed by Masayuki Nagare, was commissioned in 1970 and was dedicated on the plaza in 1972. The sculpture was composed of a set of two black granite pyramids that were 34 feet long, 17 feet wide and 14 feet high. The 1993 World Trade Center Bombing Memorial by Elyn Zimmerman was dedicated in 1995; it was a granite fountain dedicated to the 1993 bombing victims. Fritz Koenig's bronze sculpture The Sphere, measuring 25 feet (7.6 m) high, was dedicated in 1972. Ideogram, a stainless-steel sculpture designed by James Rosati, was located on the plaza near the Marriott World Trade Center.

== Destruction ==
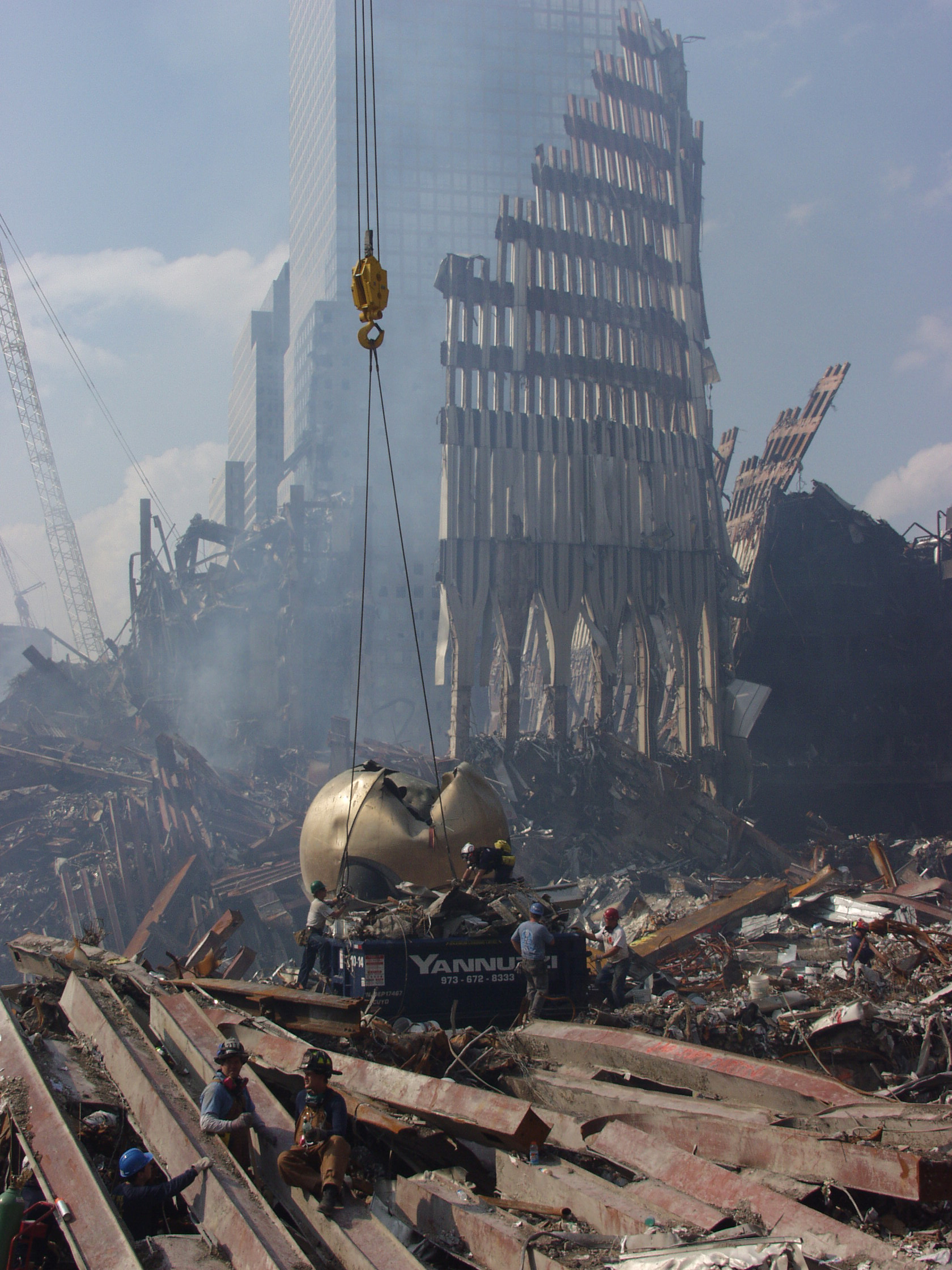
The destroyed plaza and surrounding debris, seen on September 21, 2001

On September 11, 2001, a terrorist attack unfolded at the World Trade Center site, and the plaza became an evacuation route for civilians attempting to escape the area. Firefighters directed a majority of the people who were evacuating to the mall located beneath the plaza via the lobby in the North Tower. Many people also evacuated the area by using the Vesey Street staircase, which connected the plaza to Vesey Street.

During the attacks, the Muzak speakers were not switched off due to the evacuation of the World Trade Center, which allowed the music to continue to play under the overhangs of 4 and 5 World Trade Center. Muzak audibly continued to play on the plaza until the collapse of the World Trade Center cut the power supply.

When 1 and 2 World Trade Center collapsed, about 600,000 tons of debris fell onto the plaza, crushing it. The plaza sustained heavy damage and was destroyed as a result of fires inside of the rubble in the hours after the attack. The Sphere and Cloud Fortress were recovered, but the latter was demolished in recovery efforts at the site. The Sphere is currently located in Liberty Park.

The 1993 bombing memorial was heavily damaged during the September 11 attacks, and only a small segment of the fountain survived. The Sphere was heavily damaged and was relocated to Battery Park in 2002; it was moved to Liberty Park at the World Trade Center site in 2016. The Sphere is the only artwork from the original World Trade Center to survive the September 11 attacks and subsequent recovery effort.

== Surrounding buildings and structures ==
The plaza was surrounded by all seven buildings of the World Trade Center Complex. 1 World Trade Center was located on the west-facing side of the plaza adjacent to West Street and 2 World Trade Center was located on the south side of the plaza. Marriott World Trade Center (also known as 3 World Trade Center) was located on the southwestern corner of the plaza in between the towers.

4 World Trade Center, adjacent to the South Tower, was positioned on the southeastern edge of the plaza bounded by Liberty and Church streets. 5 World Trade Center was located directly opposite of 4, bounded by Church and Vesey Street, and 6 World Trade Center was located on the northwestern edge of the plaza bounded by Vesey Street.

7 World Trade Center was located on an adjacent street, and was connected to the plaza via the Vesey Street stairs. The World Financial Center (now known as Brookfield Place) was also adjacent to the plaza's west side. The Millennium Downtown New York Hotel, located on the corner of Fulton Street across the street from the eastern edge of the plaza, was heavily damaged in the September 11 attacks.

== See also ==
- Artwork damaged or destroyed in the September 11 attacks
- Centennial Olympic Park, another public square that was the site of a terrorist attack in 1996
