= Survivors' Staircase =

Structure at the World Trade Center site

External images
- The staircase before 9/11
- The staircase several days after 9/11
- The staircase in 2006
- The staircase in the National 9/11 Museum

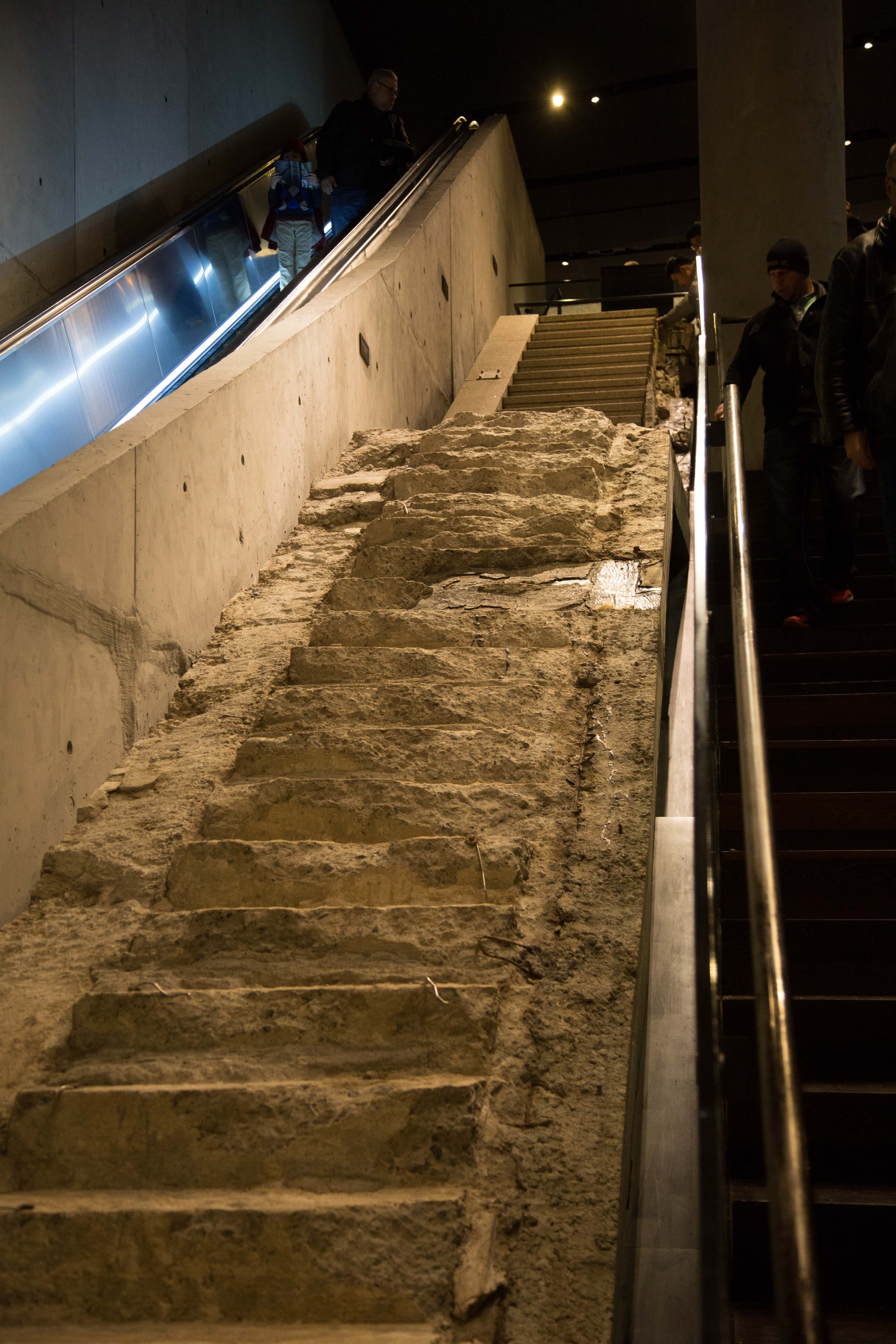
The Survivors' Staircase in the National September 11 Museum (2015)

The Survivors' Staircase is a granite and concrete staircase that was the last visible remaining original structure above ground level at the World Trade Center site. It was originally an outdoor flight of stairs and two escalators, which connected Vesey Street to the World Trade Center's Austin J. Tobin Plaza. During the September 11 attacks, the stairs were an escape route for hundreds of evacuees from 5 World Trade Center, a 9-floor building adjacent to the Twin Towers. The staircase was moved from its original location in 2008, and in 2010 it became part of the National September 11 Memorial & Museum.

== Staircase ==
The granite and concrete staircase consists of thirty-seven steps that once connected the outdoor Austin J. Tobin Plaza outside of the Twin Towers down to Vesey Street below. Prior to the attacks it had weighed 175 tons and stood 22 feet (6.7 m) high; by the time it was moved in 2008 the staircase weighed 65 tons.

After the collapse of the towers, the structure consisted of some remaining Vesey Street structure, including a fragment of the terrazzo paving from the Tobin Plaza, space for the escalators and an entrance to the Cortlandt Street station of the IRT Broadway–Seventh Avenue Line. Steps sixteen and seventeen were basically demolished by debris as well as the chrome railings.

== Preservation efforts ==
The preservation of the staircase became a matter of dispute since May 11, 2006, when it was listed as one of America's Most Endangered Places by the National Trust for Historic Preservation.

The stairs occupied part of the site of a new office building which the Port Authority of New York and New Jersey was contractually obliged to clear before the site was turned over to developer Larry Silverstein of Silverstein Properties, who in turn has a contractual obligation to develop the site as the 200 Greenwich Street office building, which is also referenced as "Tower 2" in the master plan.

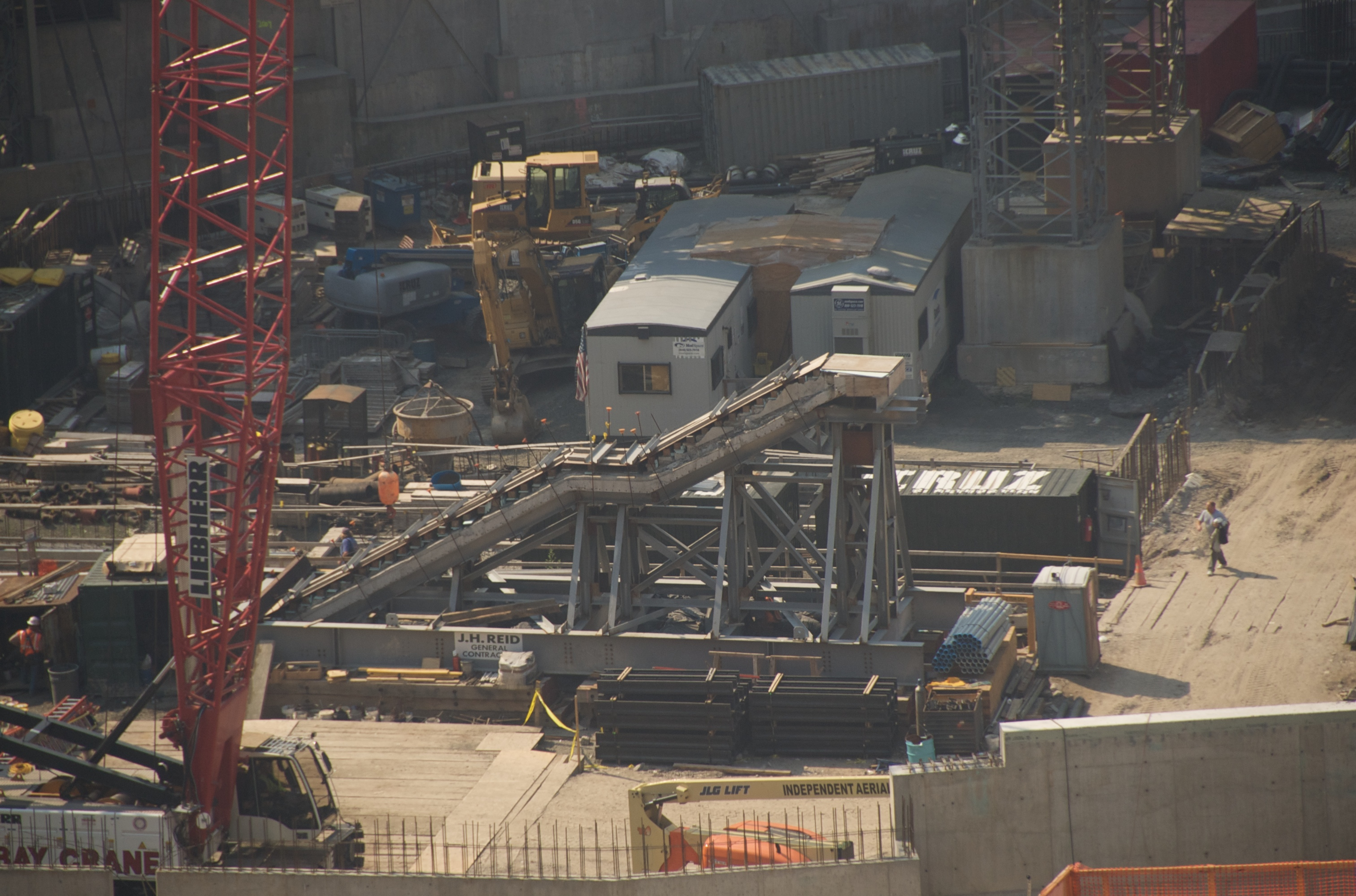
Survivors Staircase c.2008

The World Trade Center Survivors' Network urged the Port Authority and Silverstein to make a commitment to preserve the stairs, but neither made a public decision on the issue. Meanwhile, the already heavily damaged stairs continued to deteriorate due to the heavy vibrations caused by construction of the permanent PATH station, the World Trade Center Memorial and 1 World Trade Center on the site.

In January 2007, the Lower Manhattan Development Corporation (LMDC), according to Real Estate Weekly, rejected a plan proposed by structural engineer Robert Silman, who functioned as an independent consultant, to move the staircase in its entirety. Silman estimated the move would cost somewhere between $500,000 and $700,000 to complete. Those supporting dismantling the staircase claimed such a procedure would cost over $2 million.

=== Installation in museum ===
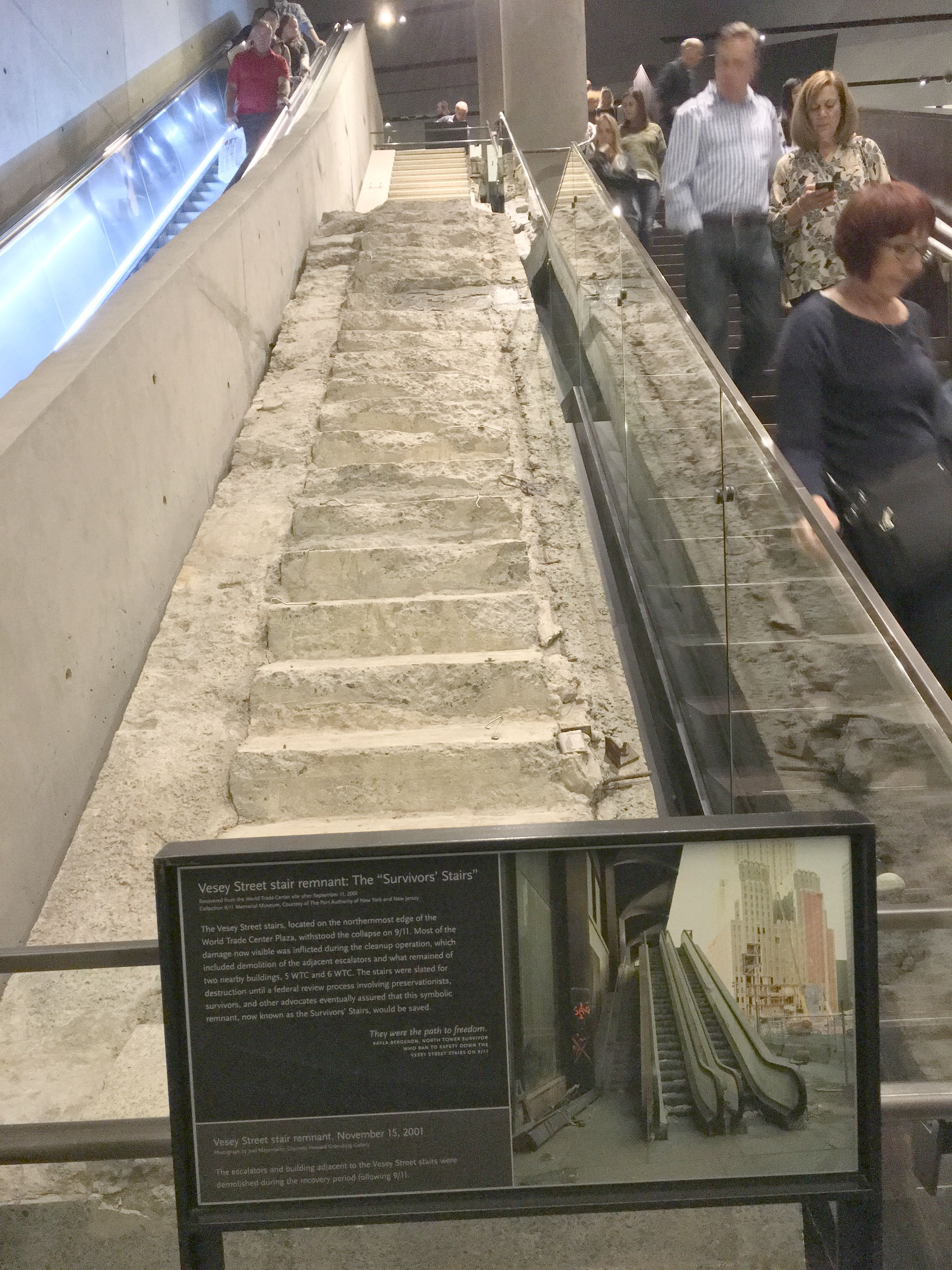
Survivors Staircase installed in the museum c.2017

In early August 2007, Avi Schick, Governor Eliot Spitzer's redevelopment chief, outlined plans to remove the stairs from their concrete structure for eventual use in the World Trade Center Memorial museum. All 38 steps would be inlaid into the side of the staircase leading from the visitor center to the underground museum. Confirming earlier plans, the LMDC announced on October 31, 2007, that the stairs would be removed and preserved, and would be restored in the future at a location inside the World Trade Center Memorial museum with a display explaining their significance.

On March 9, 2008, the Staircase was moved by crane about 200 feet (60 m) on Vesey Street. In 2010, as construction throughout the World Trade complex reached peak activity level, the staircase – as well as two "tridents" of Twin Tower facade, and other oversize artifacts – was placed into the National September 11 Memorial & Museum space before the Memorial Plaza and museum entrance pavilion were built above it. The staircase is now a major feature of the museum.

== Symbolism ==
In some articles the staircase has been compared to national monuments in the United States such as the sunken battleship USS Arizona and the memorial to the attack on Pearl Harbor, Hawaii. It has also been heavily linked to survivors' shared experiences of the attacks and evacuation due to the high number of individuals who utilized the staircase.

== Gallery ==
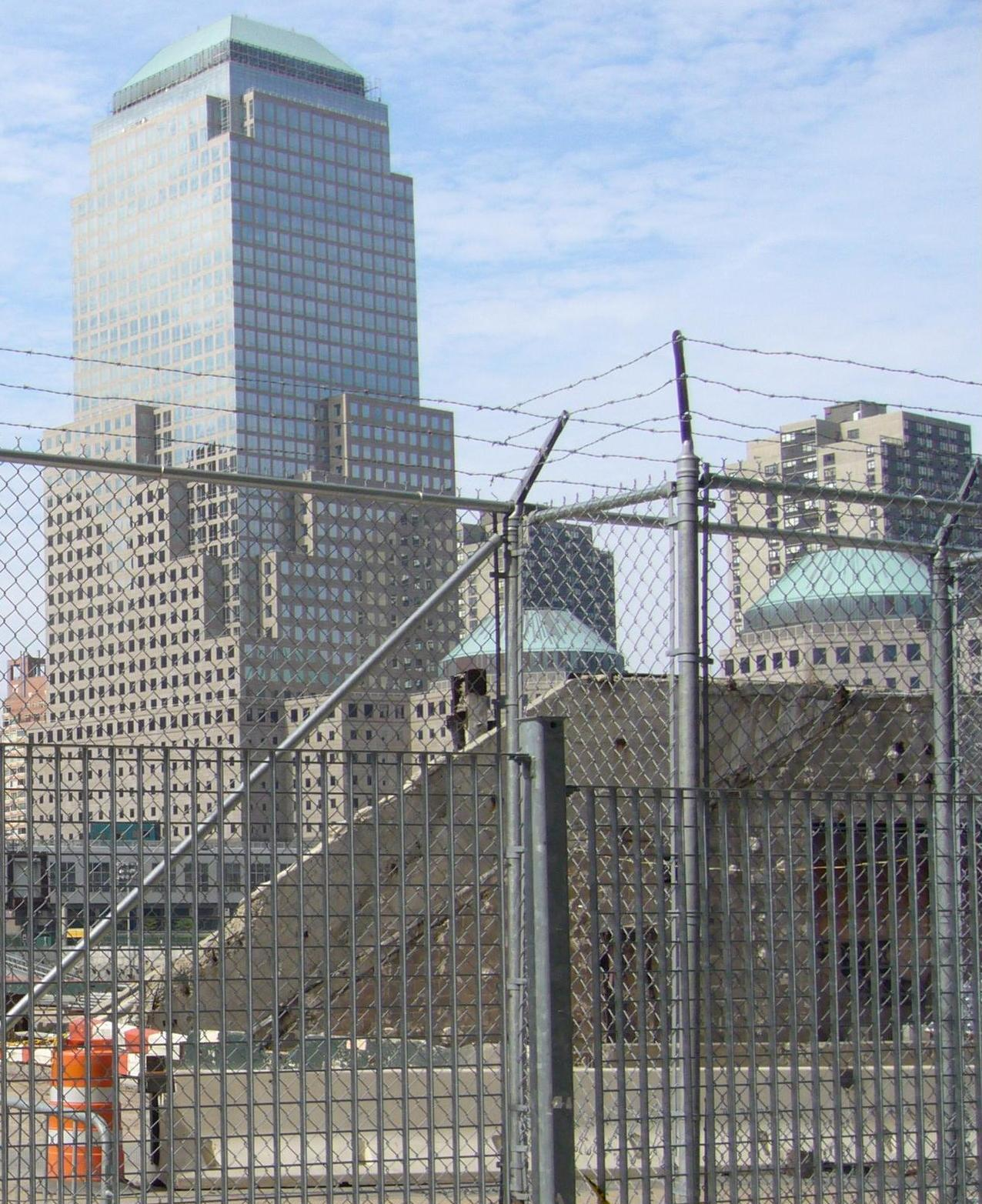
The staircase in 2006

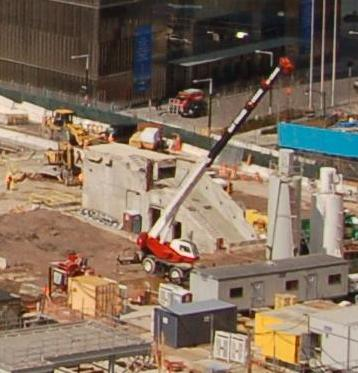
The staircase in 2007

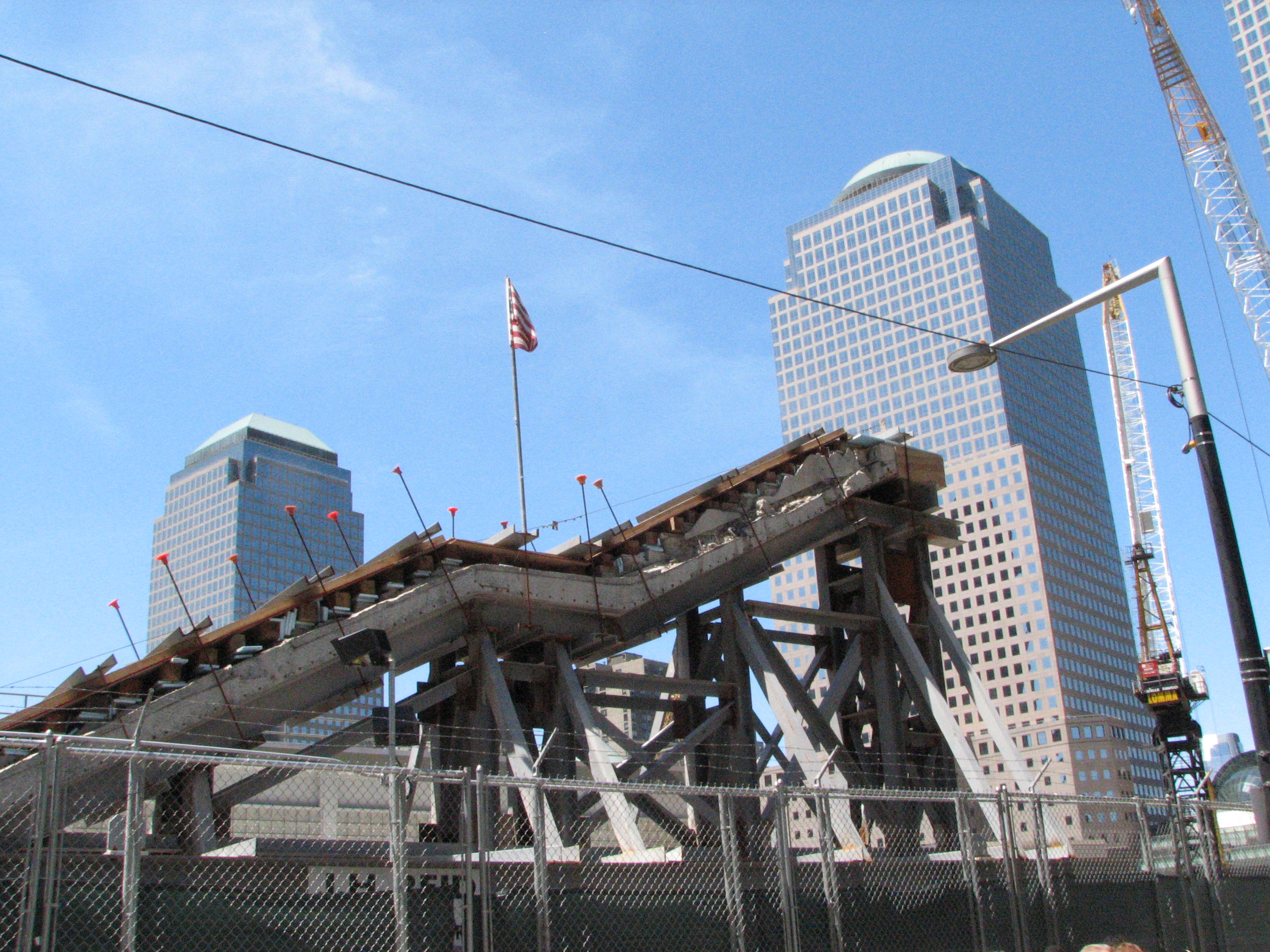
The staircase in 2008

== See also ==
- Cortlandt Street (IRT Broadway–Seventh Avenue Line)
- Stairwell A
