= Elyn Zimmerman =

American sculptor (born 1945)

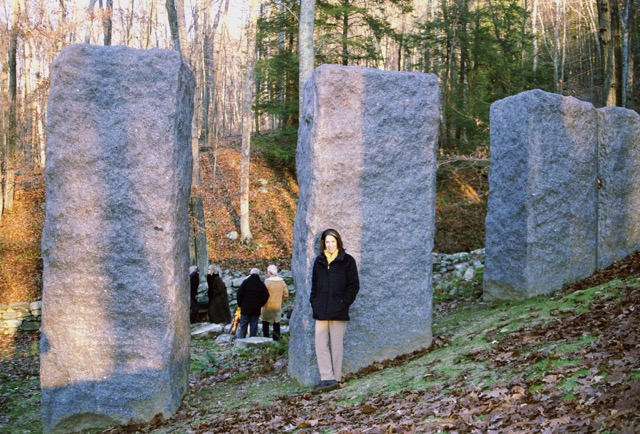
- Elyn Zimmerman
- Born: December 16, 1945 (age 80); Philadelphia, Pennsylvania, U.S.
- Known for: Public Commissions, sculpture, photography
- Website: http://www.elynzimmerman.com

Elyn Zimmerman (born December 16, 1945) is an American sculptor known for her emphasis on large scale, site specific projects and environmental art. Along with these works, Zimmerman has exhibited drawings and photographs since graduating with an MFA in painting and photography at University of California, Los Angeles in 1972. Her teachers included Robert Heineken, Robert Irwin, and Richard Diebenkorn.

In the mid 1970s Zimmerman created a number of temporary, site-specific installations for museum and gallery exhibitions. Some of these projects were presented at the Museum of Contemporary Art, Chicago; Hudson River Museum, NY; Walker Art Center, Minneapolis; Berkeley Art Museum, Berkeley; Los Angeles County Museum of Art, Los Angeles; and the Hirshhorn Museum, Washington, DC.

Zimmerman's permanent sculpture works, beginning in the 1980s, range from studio pieces and private commissions, to large scale projects for civic, university and corporate sites.

She was most recently awarded the 2016 Isamu Noguchi Award alongside Tadao Ando.

== Biography ==
Zimmerman's career as a sculptor began when she returned to California after a trip to India in 1977 where she was profoundly inspired by the archeological sites she visited. This trip precipitated her interest in doing outdoor projects and to work with stone. Upon her return she was invited to do temporary outdoor works at venues such as Artpark, Lewiston, NY; 1980 Winter Olympics, Lake Placid, NY; Laguna Gloria Art Museum, Austin, TX, and other spaces. As she has written, the ability to experiment with new materials and to learn while creating these temporary projects was invaluable and gave her confidence to create the permanent commissions that came later.

These permanent projects, beginning in 1980, are recognized for their use of stone, water, (reflecting pools, fountains) and landscape elements. Included among these large scale, public commissions is a fountain to memorialize the 1993 World Trade Center bombing in New York City; the design of the sculpture garden at the Birmingham Museum of Art, Alabama; a fountain and seating area for AT&T headquarters in New Jersey; and the plaza design at the National Geographic headquarters in Washington, DC featuring a large pool surrounded by polished and natural cleft granite boulders.

=== Early influences ===
During her undergraduate years at UCLA, Zimmerman took classes in the fine arts program while completing a BA in perceptual psychology. It was her knowledge in this discipline and her interest in contemporary art that led her to start working for Jim Turrell and Robert Irwin, doing research for their joint project for the Art and Technology exhibition at LACMA in 1967.

Working as an independent student with Robert Heineken in photography and Richard Diebenkorn in painting, she was accepted into the MFA program in 1968 and graduated with an MFA in 1972.

In the 1960s and 1970s Los Angeles was home for many art communities as well as quality art colleges: Chouinard Art Institute, Otis Parsons Art Institute, California Institute of the Arts, and the art departments at UCLA and USC.

To compensate for the scarcity of art museums interested in contemporary art and the lack of art galleries, save for well-known Ferus Gallery founded by Walter Hopps, there were alternative art exhibition spaces, such as L.A.C.E and LAICA. In 1962 ArtForum was founded in San Francisco; the Feminist Art Movement began in 1971 with roots at CalArts; LACMA initiated the first museum exhibition of Art &Technology, and what came to be called the LA Light and Space Movement was generated, making use of unconventional venues to exhibit artist's projects.

Zimmerman's work in graduate school was influenced by this rich environment as well as by the young architect she lived with during those years. He had been in the peace corps and traveled through India, Nepal and Central Asia. The images and cultural influences he shared when they met fueled her desire to travel and investigate the world herself. Together they traveled throughout the American southwest and to Mexico to see Native American and Pre-Columbian archeological sites, as well as to visit progressive contemporary architecture projects, such as Arcosonti.

Between her undergraduate and graduate years Zimmerman worked in a diverse number of positions. She was a part-time studio assistant for several artists until she was hired to work at Columbia Records in Hollywood as assistant to the head designer in the art department. She left that job when an offer came from the Charles and Ray Eames office in Venice to be the assistant to the house photographer and to run their darkroom.

=== Later influences ===
Zimmerman and Kirk Varnedoe began a correspondence in 1975 after he wrote an enthusiastic article about the drawing and photographic piece she exhibited in the 1974 Whitney Biennial. She was in NYC in 1976 to install a project at PS1 when they met for coffee, from that point on engaging in a long distance relationship. In 1977 Zimmerman moved to New York City where she and Varnedoe shared a loft in the newly named Tribeca neighborhood. They married in 1983. He was a professor of art history at NYU's Institute of Fine Art and she taught studio classes at SUNY Purchase. Varnedoe's deep knowledge of western art history and his widely celebrated talent to convey this information to students, colleagues and friends enriched Zimmerman's understanding of and appreciation for these traditions. On the other hand, her studies of oriental art history, her residency in Japan, and travels to India and China became new interests of his.

In 1979, the National Endowment for the Arts started a new program called Art in Public Places. Projects using government funds were required to use a percentage of the funds for artworks specific to the project at hand. Zimmerman was awarded one of the first of these projects in 1979, for Fort Lincoln Park in Washington, DC. Although the project was never realized, it began her relationship with Cold Spring Granite Company in Cold Spring, MN. This would become her major source of stone materials for over 30 years.

When the National Geographic Society selected David Childs of SOM to design their new headquarters in Washington, D.C., his office sought out artists who worked with stone. This became Zimmerman's first substantial commission, Marabar (1984), reinforcing her desire to pursue this type of artwork and to learn more about all the aspects of creating outdoor public projects including: construction methods; landscape requirements; sustainable building practices and materials sources. It was after spending considerable time at stone quarries that she became interested in also making smaller stone sculptures.

In 2017, the National Geographic Society unveiled plans for a campus renovation that involved the removal and destruction of Zimmerman's Marabar. Following several rounds of negotiations and a public awareness campaign by The Cultural Landscape Foundation, the Society agreed in 2021 to preserve the work and fund its relocation to a new site. Zimmerman altered the work to fit its new location at American University, several miles north of the original site, renaming the piece Sudama (1984/2023). The new iteration of the work was unveiled in April 2023.

== Selected works ==
=== Public projects ===
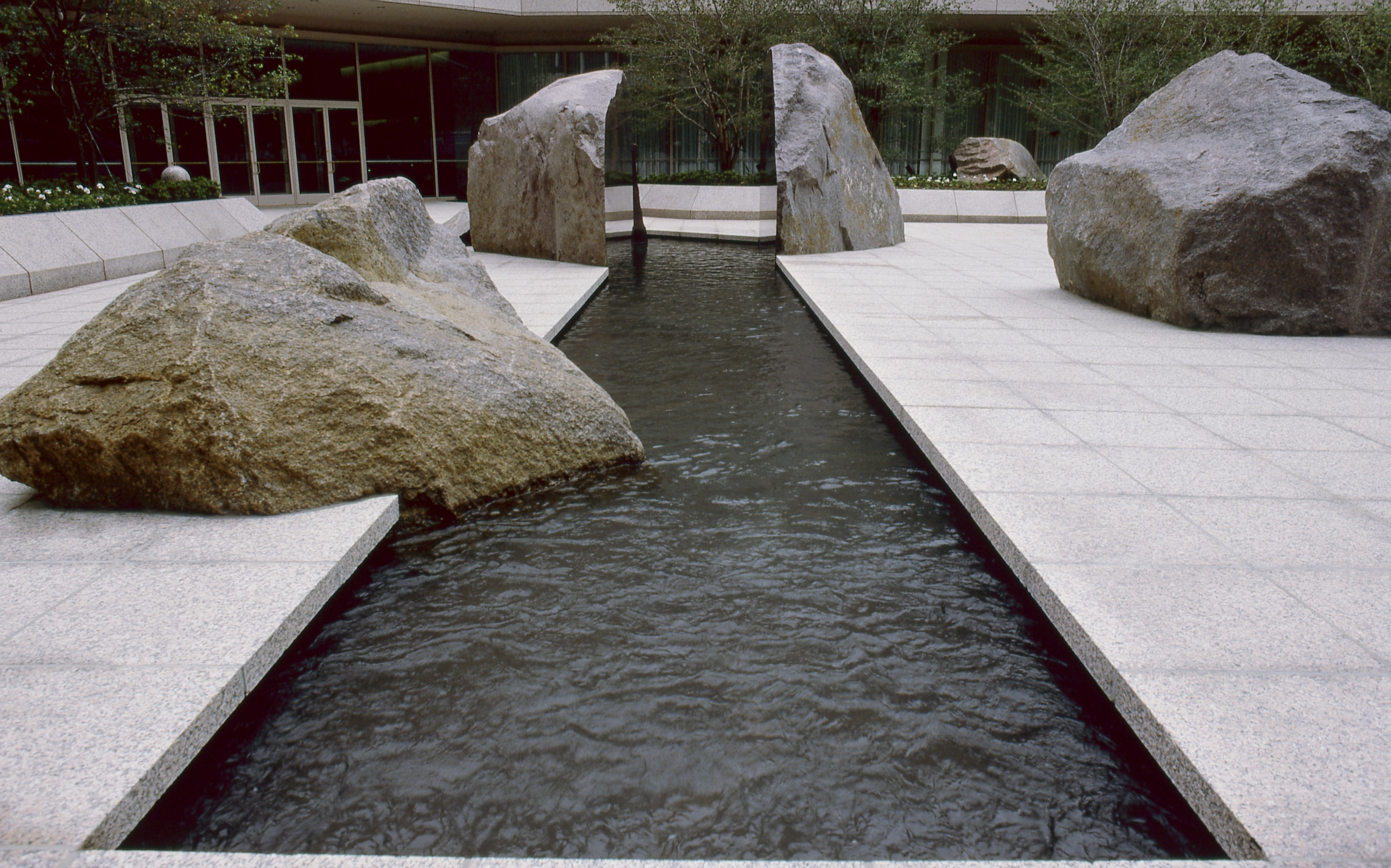

- 1984 Marabar, National Geographic Society, Washington, D.C. Plaza with 60' long pool and granite boulders. Surrounding garden includes numerous sited granite boulders.
- 1987 Terrain, O'Hare International Center, adjacent to O'Hare airport, Chicago, IL. Commissioned by Hawthorn Realty Group & Melvin Simon & Associates.
- 1991 First Market Plaza, First Market Tower Plaza, 525 Market St. San Francisco, CA. Commissioned by Tishman/Speyer and San Francisco Arts Commission.
- 1994 Untitled, Conference Center, AT&T Headquarters, Basking Ridge, NJ.

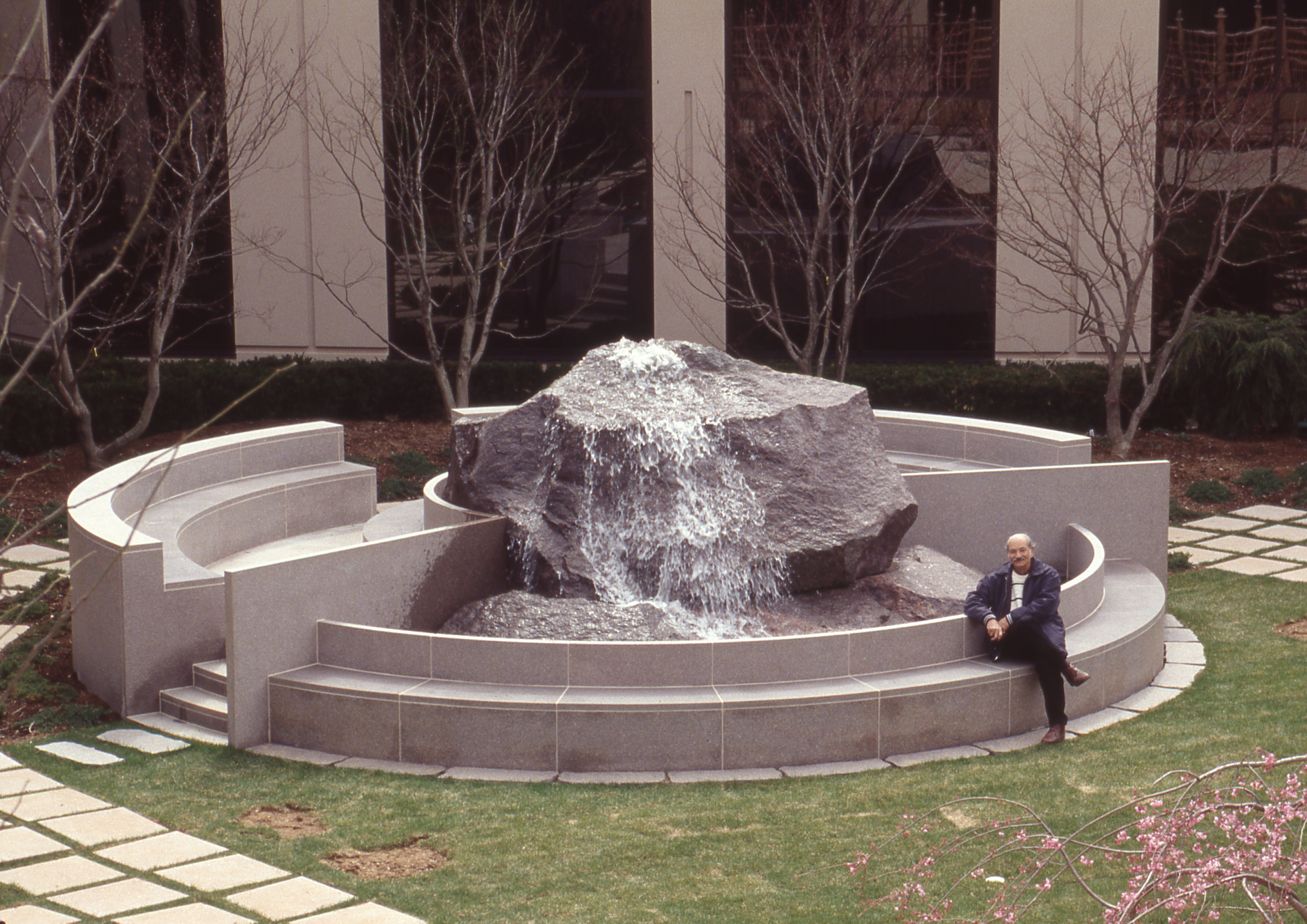
1994 Untitled, Conference Center, AT&T Headquarters, Basking Ridge, NJ

- 1993 World Trade Center Memorial, World Trade Center, New York City. Commemorating the 1993 bombing of the World Trade Center. (Destroyed on September 11, 2001)
- 2004 Wa Marafiki Mkusanyiko (Assembly of Friends), US Embassy, Dar es Salaam, Tanzania. Commissioned by the US State Department & Foundation of Art & Preservation in Embassies.
- 2008 Suspended Arcs, Olympic Park, Beijing, China. Commissioned by the Beijing 2008 Olympic Committee.
- 2010 Capsouto Park, Commissioned by the NYC Parks Department, Art Tribeca Park Commission & the Mayor's Fund. A collaborative effort by the artist & Gail Wittwer-Laird of the NYC Parks Depart. This one acre park bounded by Laight, Canal (across Canal from Juan Pablo Duarte Square) and Varick streets features landscape, seating and a 120' long x 10' wide stone and water 'canal' by the artist.

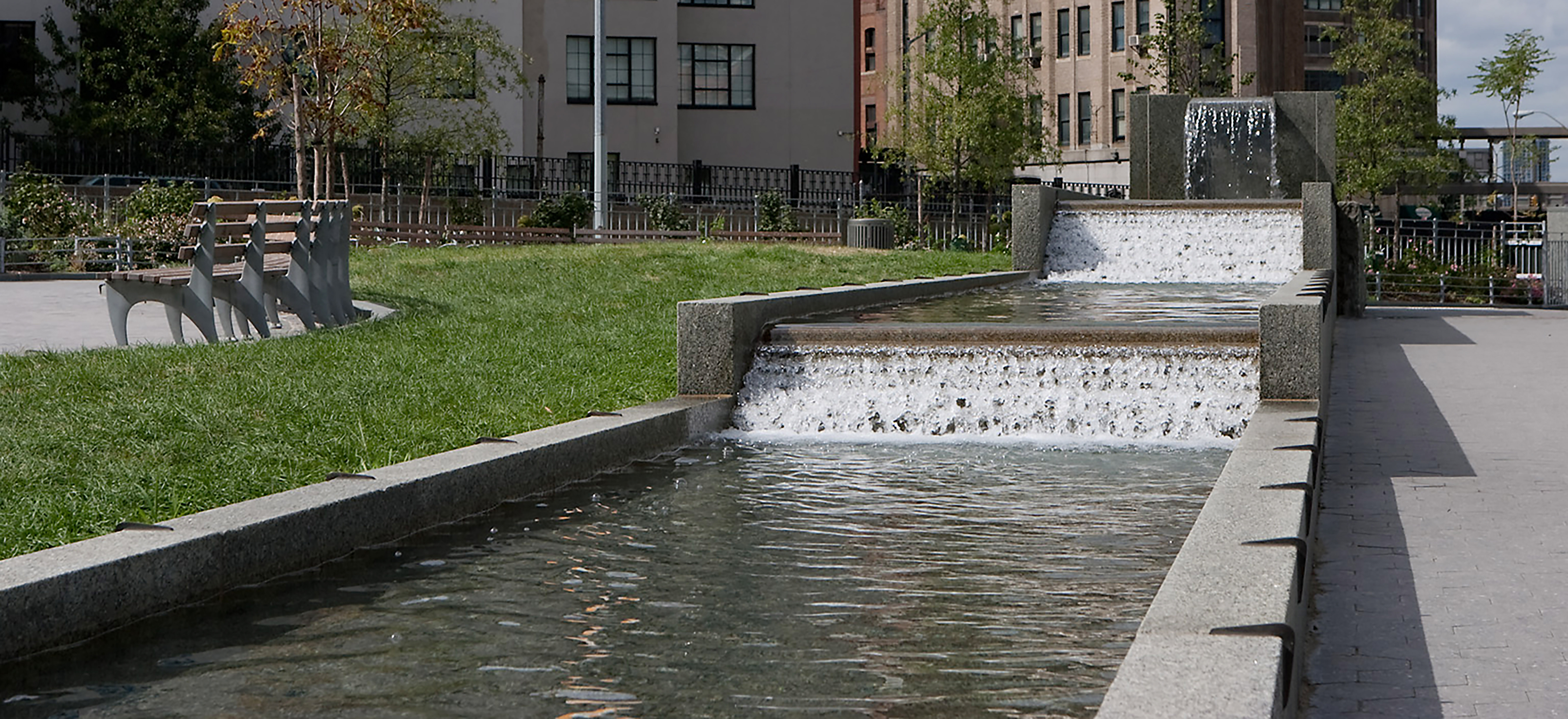
2010 Capsouto Park, Commissioned by the NYC Parks Department, Art Tribeca Park Commission & the Mayor's Fund

- 2023 Sudama, a reinstallation of Marabar (1984) on the grounds of the American University campus in Washington, D.C., comprising five massive boulders arranged in a semicircular formation around a reflecting pool.

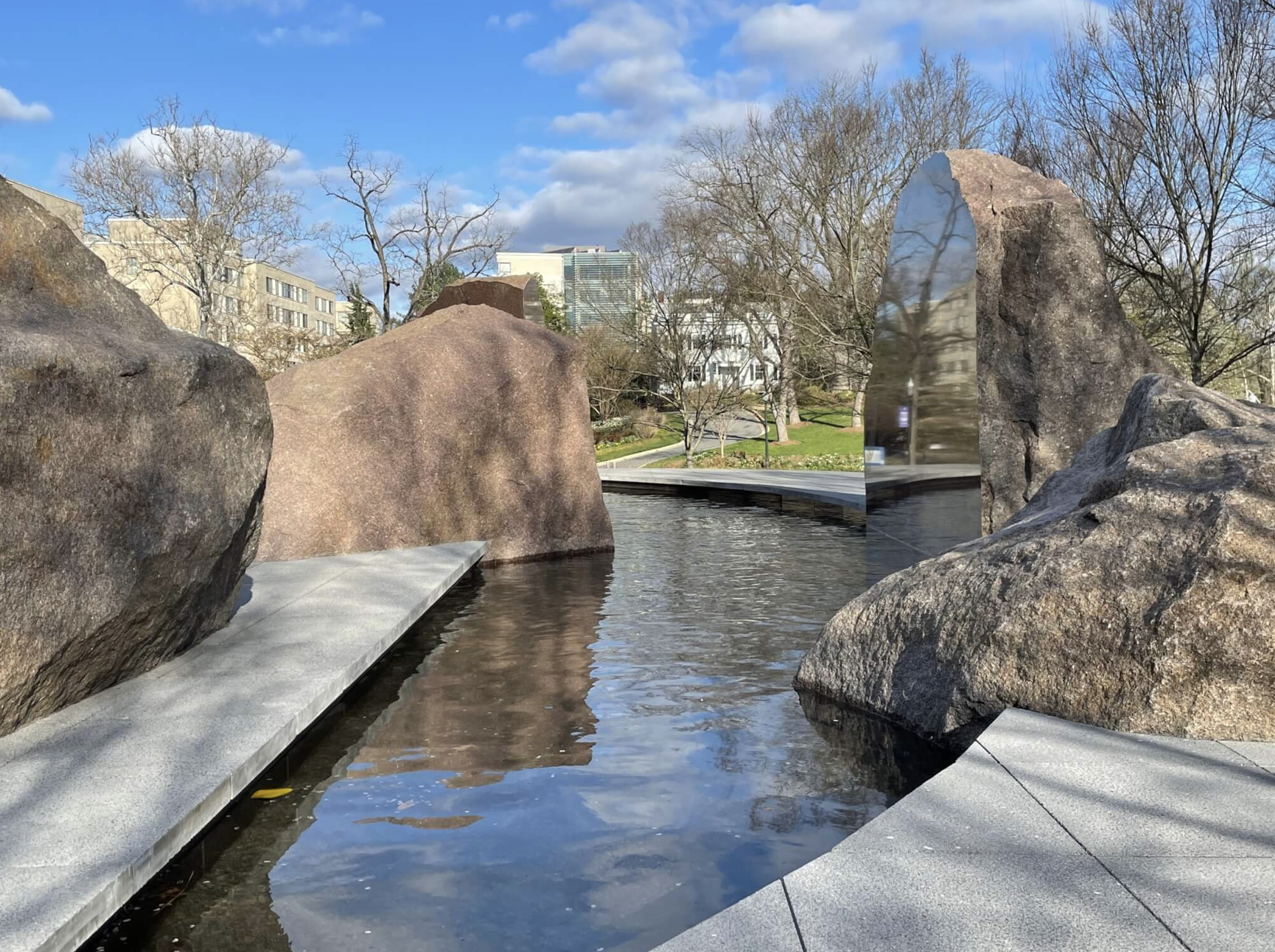

=== Sculpture commissions ===
- 1982 Shunyata, Private residence, Oakbrook, IL
- 1991 Portal Meidum, Private residence, Amagansett, NY
- 1992 Morbihan, General Mills Art Collection, Minneapolis, MN
- 1995 Agate, Private Residence, Darien, CT
- 2006 Archeos, Private residence, Kent, NY

== Selected exhibitions ==
Elyn Zimmerman has exhibited for more than 40 years in Europe, Australia, Japan, and the United States. Including but not limited to the following:

- 1974 Whitney Biennial, Whitney Museum of American Art, New York
- 1976 2nd Biennale of Sydney, Art Gallery of New South Wales, Australia
- 1979 Custom & Culture Part II, U.S. Customs House, New York
- 1979 Eight Artists: The Elusive Image, Walker Art Center, Minneapolis
- 1980 California Sculpture 1975–80, San Diego Museum of Art, CA
- 1980 Drawings: The Pluralist Decade, Venice Biennale, USA, Venice, Italy; & Institute of Contemporary Art, Philadelphia
- 1980 Architectural Sculpture, LAICA, Los Angeles
- 1981 Window Room Furniture, Houghton Gallery, Cooper Union, New York (also Tokyo and Osaka, Japan)
- 1982 Shift LA/NY, Newport Harbor At Museum, Newport Beach
- 1982 Palisades Project, Hudson River Museum, Yonkers
- 1985 Art & Architecture & Landscape, San Francisco Museum of Modern Art, CA
- 1986 Sculpture for Public Spaces, Marisa Del Re Gallery, New York
- 1990 Concept – Decoratif: Anti-formalist Art of the 70's, Nahan Contemporary Gallery, New York
- 1991 Elyn Zimmerman, Contemporary Art Museum, University of South Florida, Tampa
- 1996 Elyn Zimmerman, Gagosian Gallery, New York
- 1996 Tenth Anniversary, Socrates Sculpture Park, Long Island City, NY
- 1996 Some Grids, L.A. County Museum of Art, Los Angeles
- 1998 Urban Visions, Addison Gallery of American Art, Andover, MA
- 2001 Elyn Zimmerman: New Drawings, Gagosian, New York
- 2003 Elyn Zimmerman: Photographs, Gagosian, New York
- 2010 Contemporary Impressionism: Light, Color, Form, Time, LA Art House, CA
- 2010 Artpark: 1974–1984, UB Art Gallery, Center for the Arts, Buffalo
- 2016 Elyn Zimmerman: Wind, Water, Stone, Grounds for Sculpture, Hamilton, NJ
- 2017 Elyn Zimmerman: Sensitive Chaos, Grounds for Sculpture, Hamilton, NJ
- 2023 Elyn Zimmerman: OFFSCREEN, Galerie Bigaignon, Paris, FR
- 2025 Line(s) of Sight, Bonisson Art Center, Rognes, FR Curated by Bigaignon Gallery

== Selected collections ==
Selected public and corporate collections include: Los Angeles County Museum of Art, Los Angeles; The Museum of Modern Art, New York; New Orleans Museum of Art, New Orleans; Whitney Museum of American Art, New York; Telfair Museum Jepson Center, Savannah; Birmingham Museum of Art, Birmingham; Institute for Advanced Study, Princeton; Addison Gallery of American Art, Andover; AT&T Corporation, Basking Ridge; British Museum, London; Chase Manhattan Bank Corporation, New York; Clos Pegase Winery Sculpture Garden, Napa Valley; Commodities Corporation, Princeton; Equitable Corporation, New York; General Mills Sculpture Garden, Minneapolis; Goldman Sachs Corporate Collection, New York; Henry Buhl Collection, New York; Kramarsky Collection, New York.

== Awards ==
- 1976 Artist Fellowship Grant, National Endowment for the Arts
- 1976 New Talent Award, Los Angeles County Museum of Art, CA
- 1980 Artist Fellowship Grant, National Endowment for the Arts
- 1980 C.A.P.S. Artist Fellowship Grant, NY
- 1981 Japan – US Creative Artist Exchange Fellowship, Residency in Japan
- 1982 Artist Fellowship Grant, National Endowment for the Arts
- 1985 ASLA – Maryland Chapter for National Geographic Society Plaza, Washington D.C.
- 1986 Bessie Award – Set Design for "Memory Theater of Giulio Camillo," Creative Time, NYC
- 2007 Excellence in Design for Capsouto Park, Art Commission of the City of New York
- 2010 Great Places in America Award /Public Spaces, The Charles Ireland Sculpture Garden, Birmingham Museum of Art
- 2010 Resident American Academy in Rome (RAAR '10) Roy Lichtenstein Residency
- 2015 San Francisco's Best Public Open Spaces, CURBED/SF
- 2016 Isamu Noguchi Award, Noguchi Museum, Long Island City, NY

== Monographs ==
- 2015 Elemental / Elyn Zimmerman Works on Paper. Milan: Charta.
- 2017 Elyn Zimmerman: Places + Projects 40 Years. Hamilton, NJ: Grounds for Sculpture.
