= Ideogram (sculpture) =

1972 steel sculpture by James Rosati

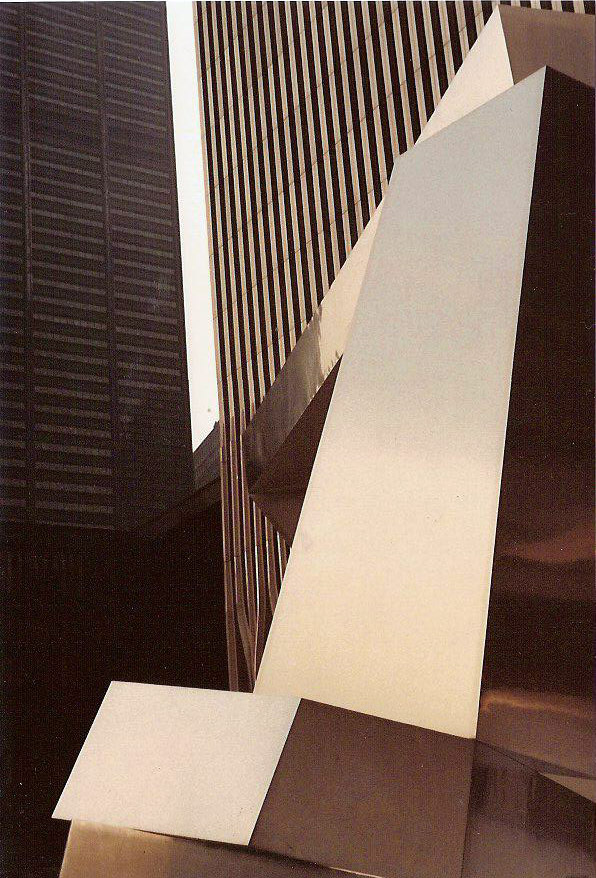
- Detail of the sculpture
- Artist: James Rosati
- Year: 1972–2001
- Dimensions: 7.2 m × 5.9 m × 8.7 m (23.5 ft × 19.5 ft × 28.5 ft)
- Condition: Destroyed in September 2001 WTC Attacks

Ideogram was a stainless steel sculpture in New York City by American sculptor James Rosati, completed in 1972. The work consisted of a number of intersecting beams with reflective surfaces.

Located on the Austin J. Tobin Plaza, in front of the Marriott World Trade Center, the work was lost in the September 11 attacks. Though the sculpture may have survived the attacks and collapse of the buildings, its steel material was indistinguishable from the Ground Zero rubble. As a result, the sculpture was never recovered, and its remains were removed from Ground Zero along with the rest of the rubble.

According to Saul Wenegrat, former director of the art program for the Port Authority, the sculpture may have been the most photographed piece of art in the World Trade Center Complex. It was also featured in many fashion advertisements.

== Gallery ==
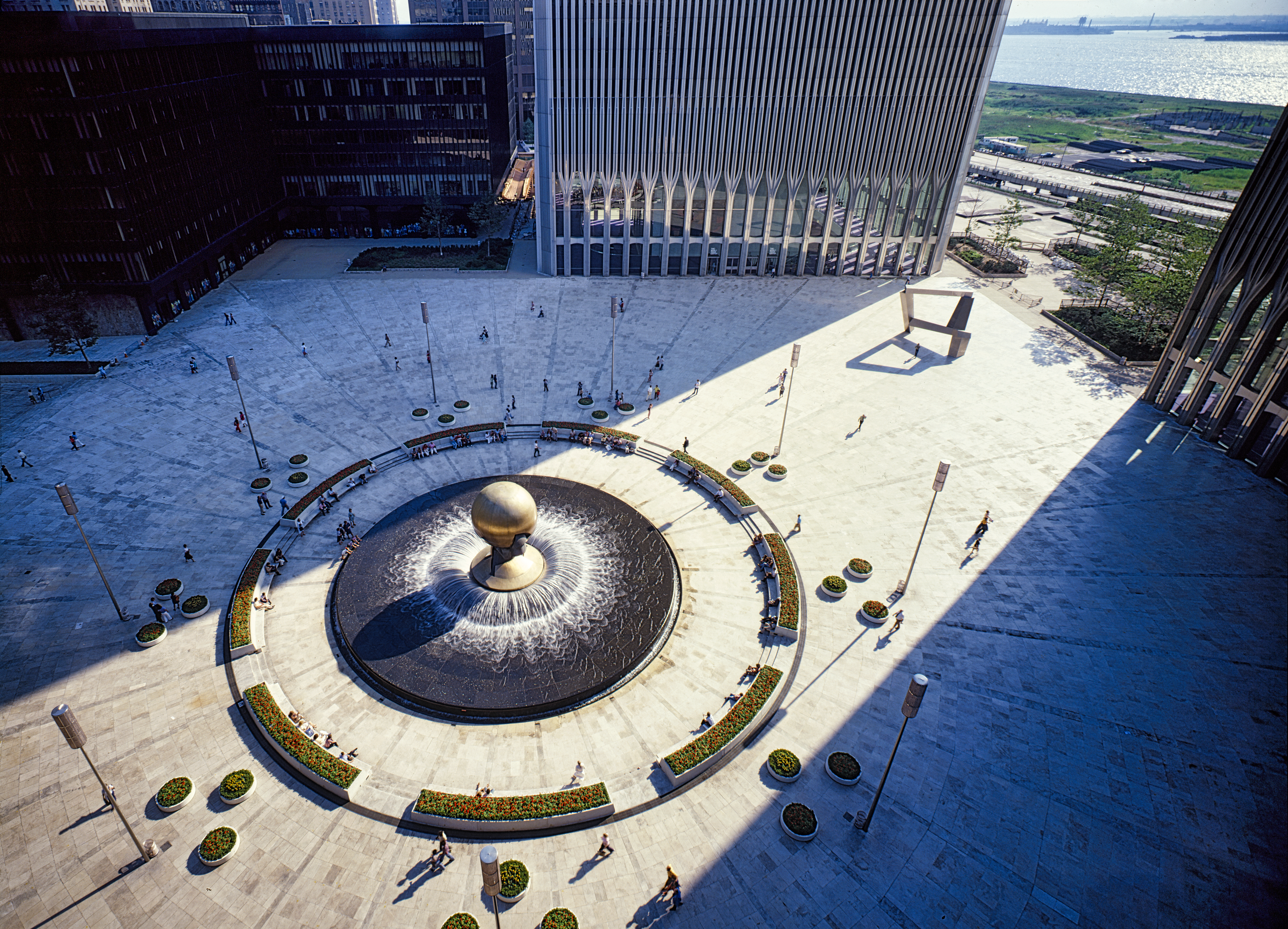
The sculpture in 1976, visible in the upper right.

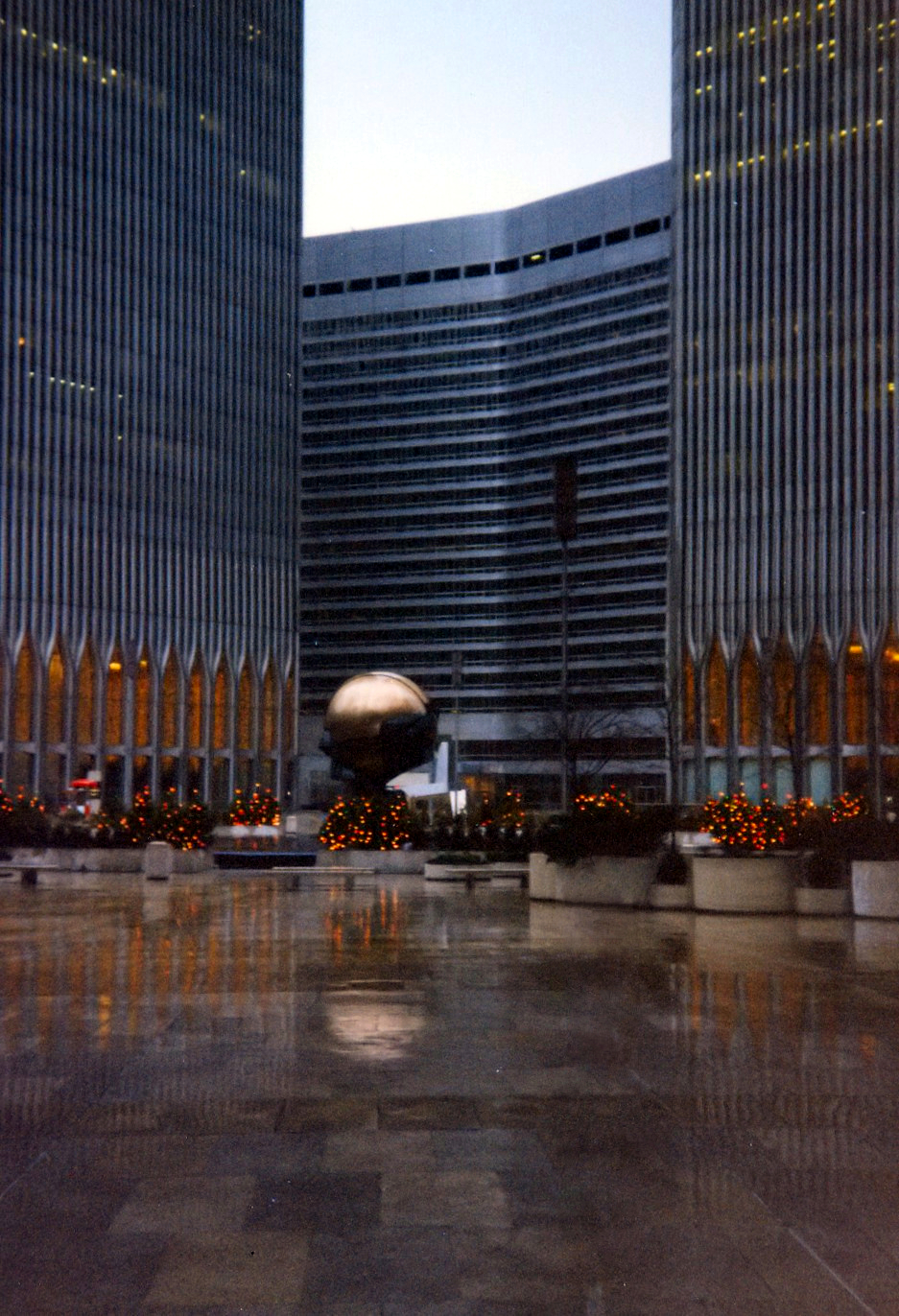
The sculpture in 1995, just visible behind The Sphere

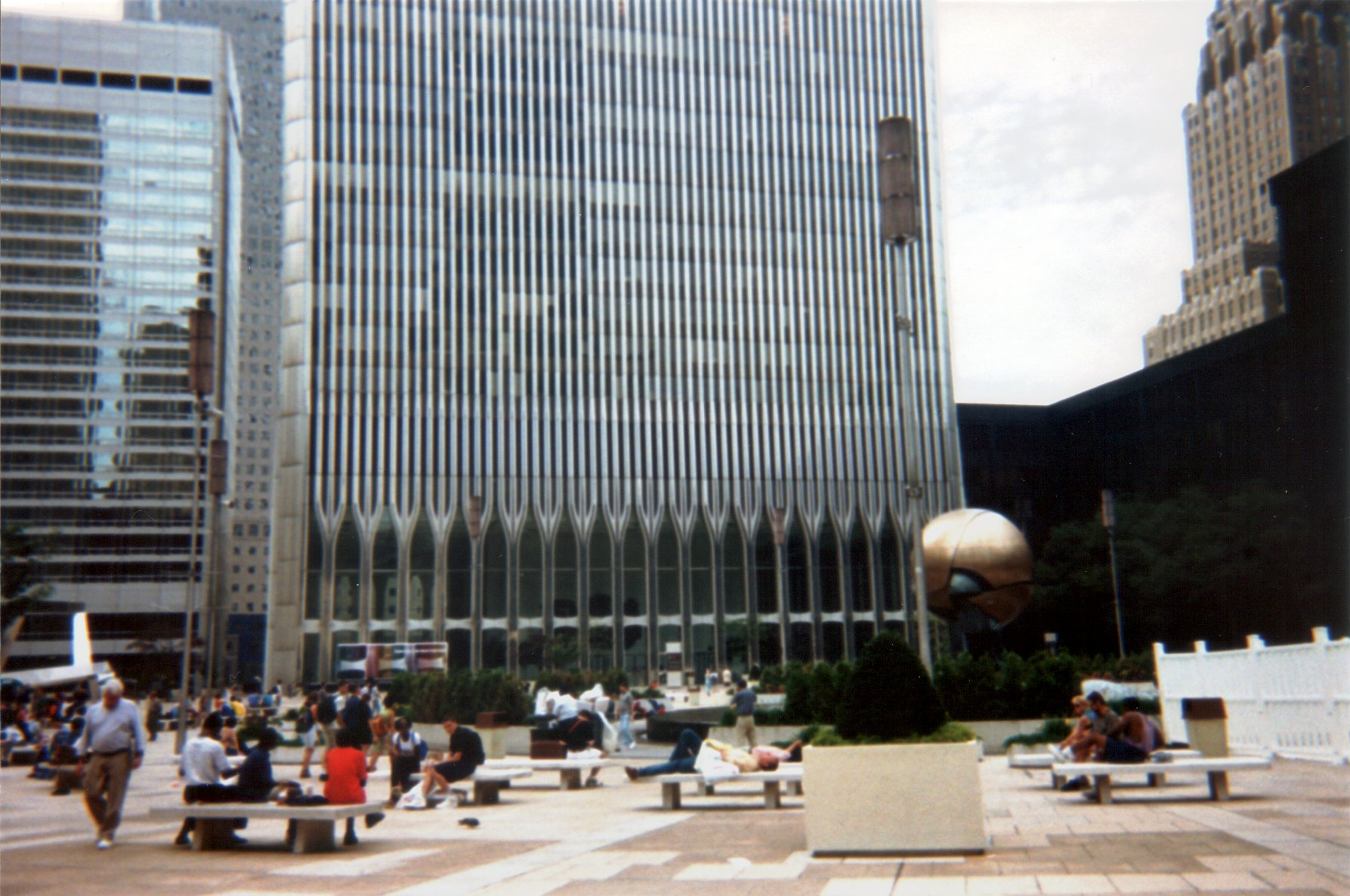
To the left of the plaza in 1998

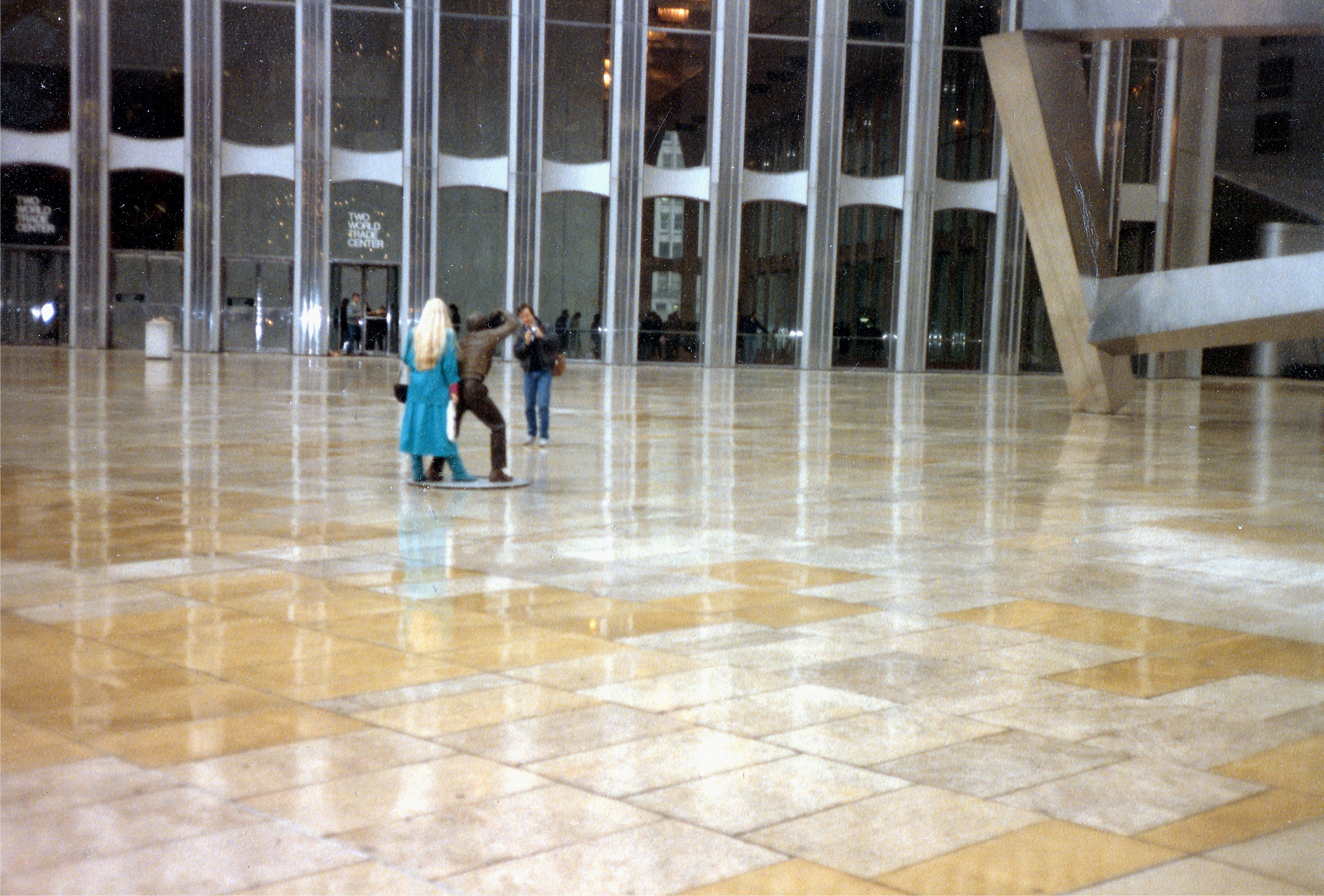
Ideogram sculpture in 1985

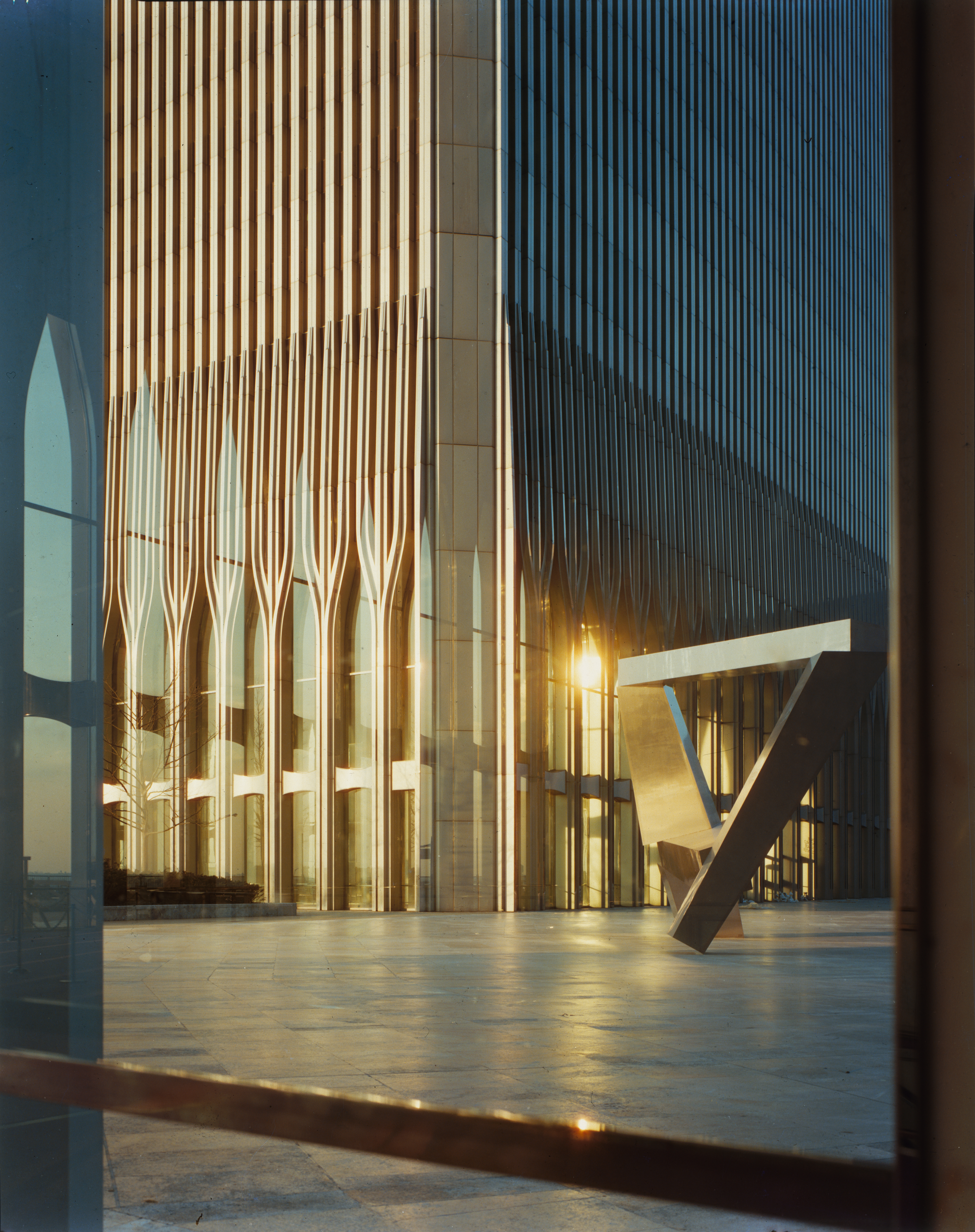
World Trade Center exterior entrance arches with Ideogram, 1976

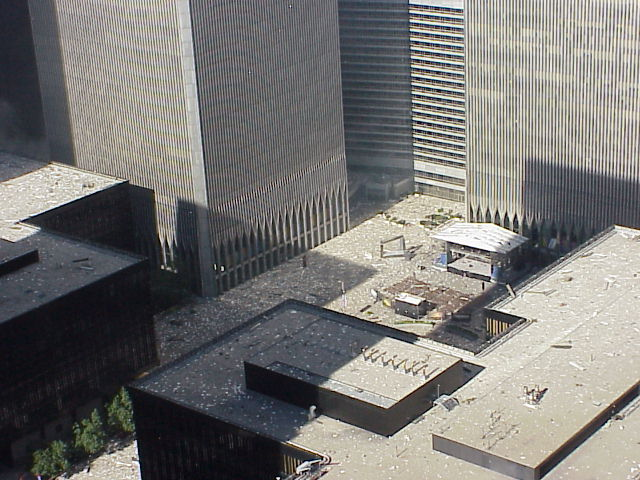
One of the last known photographs of the Ideogram, seen in the middle below the Marriott Hotel, during the September 11 attacks.

== See also ==
- Artwork damaged or destroyed in the September 11 attacks
