= Marriott World Trade Center =

Hotel in Manhattan, New York (1981–2001)

New York Marriott World Trade Center
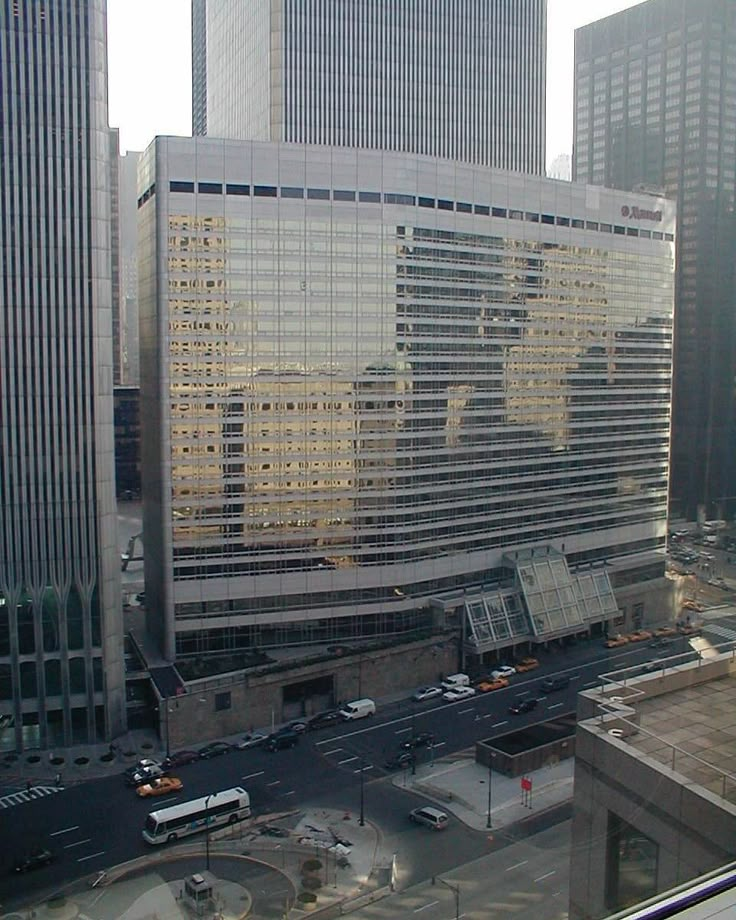
- The Marriott World Trade Center in 2001
- Alternative names: Vista International Hotel (1981–1995); Three World Trade Center

General information
- Status: Destroyed
- Type: Hotel
- Location: World Trade Center, Manhattan, New York City
- Coordinates: 40°42′41″N 74°00′50.5″W
- Construction started: March 1979
- Completed: July 1, 1981
- Opening: April 1, 1981
- Destroyed: September 11, 2001
- Operator: Host Marriott Corporation

Height
- Roof: 73.7 m (242 ft)

Technical details
- Floor count: 22

Design and construction
- Architect: Skidmore, Owings & Merrill
- Developer: Port Authority of New York and New Jersey
- Structural engineer: Leslie E. Robertson Associates
- Main contractor: Tishman Construction

The New York Marriott World Trade Center, also known as 3 World Trade Center (3 WTC), was a 22-story, 825-room hotel in New York City, within the original World Trade Center complex in downtown Manhattan. It opened in April 1981 as the Vista International Hotel, the first major hotel since 1836 to open in Manhattan south of Canal Street.

The hotel was damaged in the World Trade Center bombing by al-Qaeda terrorists on February 26, 1993. The Port Authority of New York and New Jersey considered demolishing the building, but instead decided to repair it. The building's structure was reinforced, and it re-opened in November 1994. In November 1995, it was bought by Marriott Corporation and renamed the New York Marriott World Trade Center.

In 2001, as part of the September 11 attacks by al-Qaeda, the hotel was mostly destroyed by the collapse of the World Trade Center's Twin Towers (1 and 2 WTC), after two terrorist hijacked planes were crashed into them. There were 43 deaths inside the hotel: 41 firefighters and 2 employees. Only the southern end of the building was spared, and it was eventually demolished to make way for reconstruction. The hotel was not replaced as part of the post-2001 World Trade Center complex, although its address (3 WTC) was reused for the tower at 175 Greenwich Street.

== Description ==
It was designed by Skidmore, Owings and Merrill in 1978–79. The building was a 22-story steel-framed structure with 825 rooms and six basement levels (labeled B1 through B6). The hotel was connected to the North Tower via an entrance at concourse level, and a small pedestrian walkway that extended from the west promenade of the Marriott to the North Tower on plaza level.

The hotel also had 26,000 square feet (2,400 m^{2}) of meeting space on the entire third floor. It was considered a four-diamond hotel by the American Automobile Association (AAA). It was meant for business travelers, who were offered translators and a reference library of 28 foreign-language dictionaries. The staff was also multilingual. The lobby was split between two levels, and was themed around the sea, featuring a golden sculpture of sails. On the 22nd floor, there was a gym that was the largest of any hotel in New York City at the time, with a swimming pool and a running track with views of the Hudson River and the Austin J. Tobin Plaza.

The pool was put near the top so the hotel could be flooded if a fire occurred. The hotel featured two restaurants: The Tall Ships Bar and Grill, located at street-level, and the Greenhouse Café, a restaurant on the plaza level that featured a large skylight looking up at the North and South Tower. Previously, another restaurant had operated called The American Harvest; however, it was removed following the bombing in 1993 and was renovated and remained as a rentable space called the Harvest Room.

== History ==
The hotel under construction in 1980

The hotel was first known as the Vista International Hotel, but also became known as World Trade Center 3 (WTC 3 or 3 WTC), the World Trade Center Hotel, the Vista Hotel, and the Marriott Hotel. The building was designed by Skidmore, Owings & Merrill with construction beginning in March 1979. It opened on April 1, 1981, with 100 of 825 rooms available, and it was completed in July 1981. The construction cost $70 million. It was planned and managed by Hilton International, but they could not use the Hilton name for the hotel because of an agreement with Hilton Hotels to not use the name in the U.S. The Vista was the first major hotel to open in Lower Manhattan south of Canal Street since 1836. Shortly before the opening day of the hotel, a fire broke out on the 7th floor.

The Vista was first under lease to WTC Hotel Associates of Chicago. Kuo Hotel Corporation, based in Hong Kong, bought the hotel's leasehold in 1982. The hotel was successful, creating a nightlife culture in the area and spurring development of more hotels in Lower Manhattan. In 1989, the Port Authority of New York and New Jersey bought the leasehold from Kuo for $78 million, but the operating rights remained in the hands of Hilton International as management agent.

=== 1993 World Trade Center bombing ===
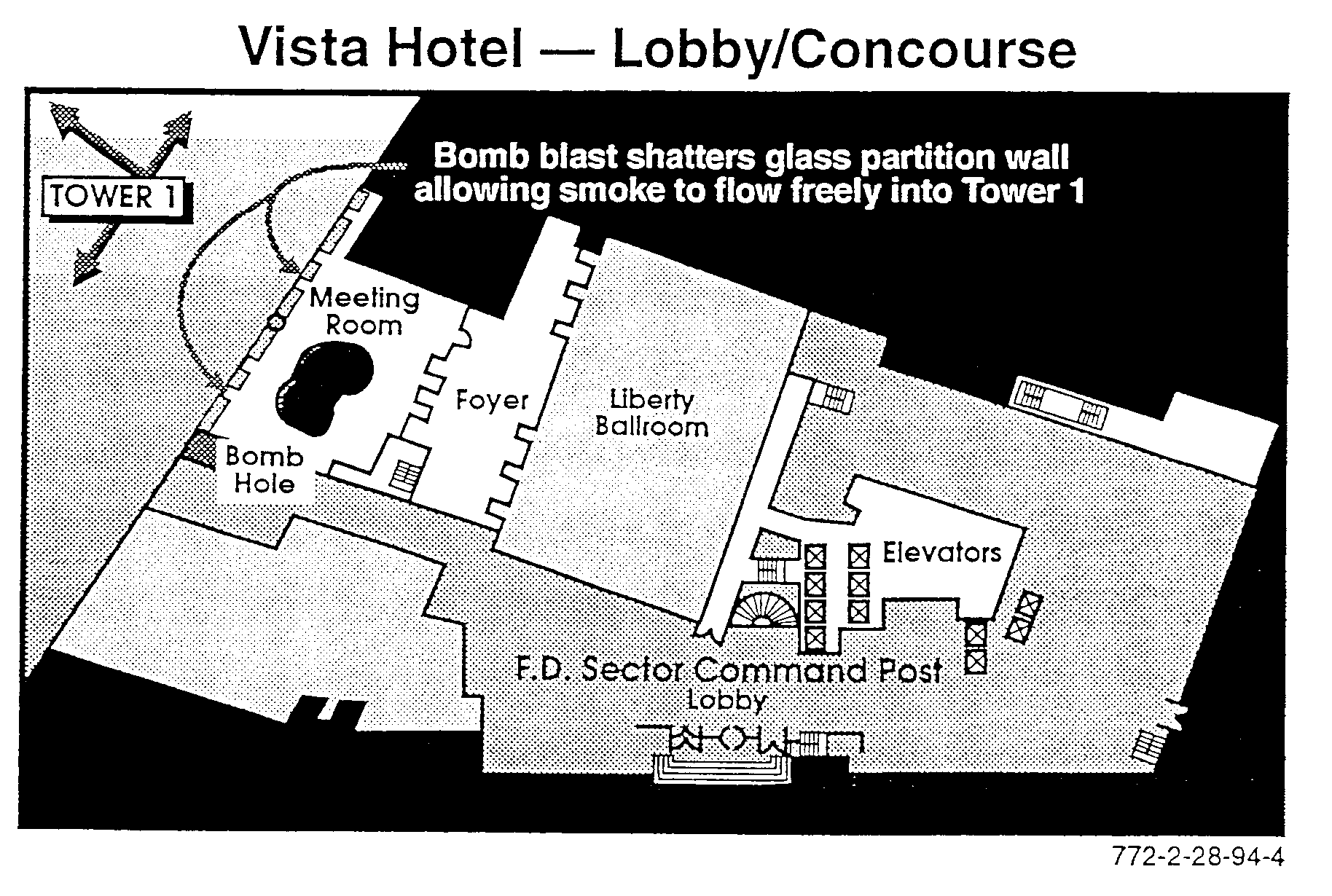
FEMA diagram of the damage sustained by the hotel during the bombing

On February 26, 1993, the hotel was seriously damaged as a result of the World Trade Center bombing. Terrorists affiliated with al-Qaeda took a Ryder truck loaded with 1,500 pounds (682 kilograms) of explosives and parked it in the North Tower parking garage below the hotel's ballroom. They likely viewed this as the area where an explosion would cause the most structural damage. At 12:18 p.m. (EDT), the explosion destroyed or seriously damaged the lower- and sub-levels of the World Trade Center complex. The Marriott Financial Center, a hotel located two blocks west, served as press conference area and a command post for the law enforcement response.

The city's Port Authority considered demolishing the building for some time. The building was instead closed for 18 months while they worked on extensive repairs. Reinforcements were made to the hotel's structure, including the installation of "the largest steel beam ever put in a building to that point".

=== Between reopening and the September 11 attacks ===
The hotel reopened on November 1, 1994. On November 9, 1995, the hotel was sold to Host Marriott Corporation for $141.5 million. It was renamed to the New York Marriott World Trade Center. The new company managing the hotel started operations in January 1996. Security was increased at the hotel, but they were ineffective in the face of the attacks in September 2001. In January 2001, 77 Port Authority Police Department (PAPD) police cadets graduated in a ceremony held at the hotel.

=== September 11 attacks ===
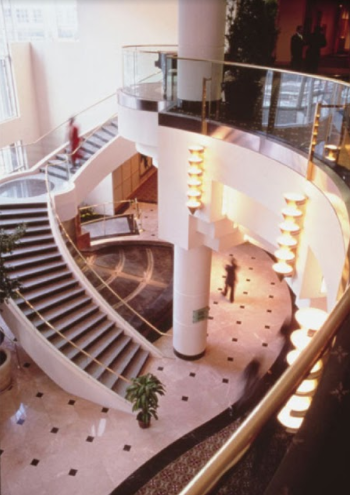
The lobby of the hotel in the mid-1990s

On September 11, 2001, al-Qaeda terrorists hijacked four planes to crash into various targets in the U.S. Two crashed into both of the World Trade Center's Twin Towers, which were located right next to the hotel. Forty-three people in the hotel were killed, out of the roughly 2,753 people who died in New York City from the attacks. These included 41 firefighters and 2 hotel employees who assisted them with evacuating guests. Eleven guests were never identified, and it is not known if they died in the building or elsewhere in the World Trade Center complex. LDS Living claimed "most likely they were in the main towers attending business meetings or shopping." 14 people survived both collapses from inside the building.

On September 11, the hotel had 940 registered guests. The National Association for Business Economics (NABE) was holding its yearly conference at the hotel from September 8 to 11, 2001. In addition, the hotel was planned to host the Law School Admission Council's New York City Law School Forum—a law school recruiting event—on September 14 and 15. The council was expecting 4,000 students to attend, from 160 schools. About 11 people who were planning to go to the forum were scheduled to check in to the hotel on the 11th but did not make it there before the attacks started.

==== Crashes into the Twin Towers ====
When American Airlines Flight 11 crashed into the North Tower (1 WTC) at 8:46 a.m. EDT, its landing gear fell and crashed through the roof into an office next to the 22nd-floor pool, breaking the glass above the restaurant and forcing people to duck under furniture. The whole building shook, and parts of it caught on fire. Alarms went off throughout the building, and its phones and elevators shut down. The freight elevator still worked, however. Security guards escorted out the group attending the NABE conference. The hotel's intercom told guests to be calm and stay in their rooms.

Firefighters reported human remains and corpses on the roof, from people who fell or jumped from the south face of the North Tower. At least ten firefighter companies used the lobby as a staging area; it is possible that many or all of the companies were not sent there, but instead got lost amidst the evacuation of the towers.

United Airlines Flight 175 crashed into the South Tower (2 WTC) at 9:03 a.m. Some fire companies evacuated guests who were on the upper floors, being followed by elevator mechanic Robert Graff and two employees with master keys: Joseph Keller, the hotel's executive housekeeper, and Abdu Malahi, an audiovisual technician assisting with the law school forum who was the only civilian Arab who died on 9/11. The evacuation effort was led by Keller, Richard Fetter (the hotel's resident manager), and Nancy Castillo (human resources head at Marriot World Trade Center and Marriott Financial Center). Fetter attempted to get a new version of the hotel registry, but their computer system had shut down, so he found the most recently-printed copy and a set of emergency phone numbers.

People who were escaping the tower crashes, especially the North Tower, also transited through the hotel; these people numbered a thousand or more. This is in part due to a door at the north face of the building, facing the North Tower. The people in the lobby moved away from the North Tower, walking south through the hotel, until they reached the Tall Ships Bar and Grill, which opened onto Liberty Street. A police officer stood at the exit, stopping civilians from crossing the street whenever debris was falling.

==== Collapse of the Twin Towers ====
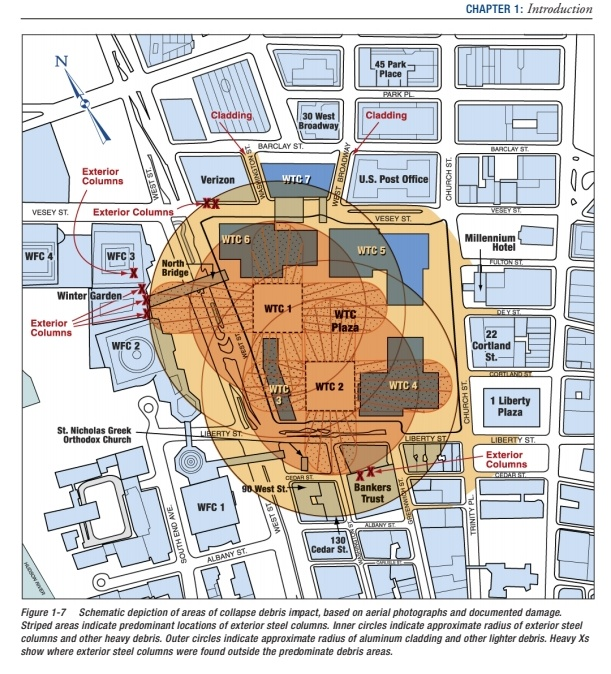
A map of debris after the collapse of the Twin Towers, showing the direction each tower's walls fell, and how the southern end of the hotel was barely saved

The collapse of the South Tower at 9:59 a.m. crushed the middle of the building, creating a large gap that nearly split the hotel in half. The lobby was filled with debris, but nonetheless acted as a shield for firemen, police, and hotel staff, due to its reinforcements after the bombing. Abdu Malahi was killed. Before the collapse, there were seven firemen from Engine Company No. 74 in the middle of the hotel on the 21st floor, four of whom died. Around 17 people in the evacuation effort were still alive on the 3rd and 4th floors; three firefighters on these floors went upstairs to find a fireman who was radioing a mayday signal, Michael Brennan. On the half of the building that was nearer to the South Tower, three civilians and two firemen trapped on the 3rd floor escaped to a reception room on the 2nd floor by crawling through an opening in a wall on an I-beam, which probably fell from the tower. In the lobby, firefighters began exiting the building to get reinforcements. Joseph Keller and Fire Lieutenant Bob Nagel were trapped by debris, and the other firefighters began trying to cut away the debris around them using saws. While this was happening, the North Tower collapsed.

The collapse of the North Tower at 10:28 destroyed the rest of the hotel, aside from a small section surrounding the southern stairwell. This section would have collapsed if not for the reinforcements made after the 1993 bombing. There were 14 survivors trapped in this section, on the 2nd floor; this included 13 firemen from Company 74 and hotel guest Frank Razzano, who had evacuated from his 19th-floor room. The group found a hole in the building, and threaded either a rug or drape through it, then climbed down onto a pile of debris. Keller and the three firefighters who went to rescue Michael Brennan died from the second collapse. Six men from the Brooklyn Heights Ladder 118 fire company (including Scott Davidson, father of comedian and actor Pete Davidson) died from the collapse, after saving around 900 guests. All the firemen still in the lobby escaped, and Richard Fetter survived.

=== After destruction ===
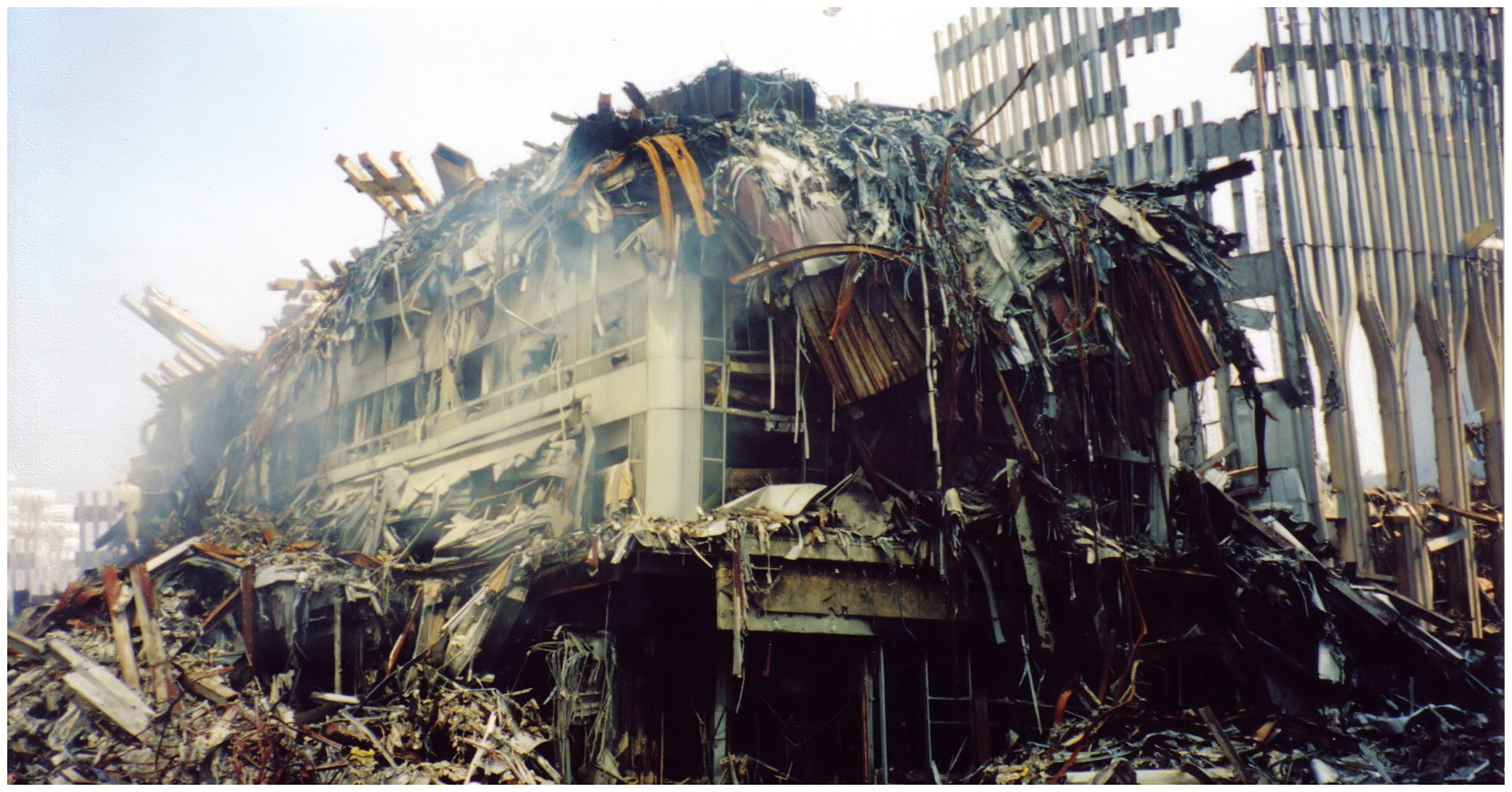
The section of the hotel remaining after the towers collapsed, located at its south end

Bill Marriott, the businessman who owned the hotel, delivered a speech to his employees on the 20th, where he thanked them for their work on September 11, and announced they would be employed until at least October 5, and covered by the hotel's health insurance for a year. The guests staying at the Marriott World Trade Center and the Marriott Financial Center, which was also damaged during the attacks, were sent to seven other Marriott hotels in the city. At those locations, security was increased and cancellation fees were waived.

In January 2002, the remnants of the hotel were dismantled to make way for reconstruction. The Marriott Corporation was then offered an opportunity to rebuild the hotel in the same location within the World Trade Center site, as its lease which was signed until 2094 had not expired. Marriott declined the offer, and in October 2003, the Port Authority voted on an agreement under which the Host Marriott Corporation would "surrender the premises", resulting in termination of the lease and thus giving the land to the National September 11 Memorial & Museum. Marriott thus did not have to fulfill its obligation to rebuild the hotel.

In August 2002, the FBI found, within their records, what is currently the only known audio recording containing both World Trade Center plane crashes in a continuous or uninterrupted audiotape. The recording is of a conversation between two men at the hotel's cafe: one was a tax assessor for the city government who was being investigated by the FBI for allegedly taking bribes, and the other was tax consultant Stephen McArdle, who was cooperating with the investigation; McArdle was wearing a hidden wiretap recording the conversation to the audiotape, which two FBI agents were listening in on. The men on the tape and the FBI agents all survived the attacks.

==== Memorials and legacy ====
On the afternoon of the attacks, at the World Trade Center's ruins (later nicknamed "Ground Zero"), photographer Thomas E. Franklin captured the now-iconic image Raising the Flag at Ground Zero. It depicts firefighters raising the American flag upon a flagpole found within the rubble; the flagpole was likely present at the Marriott. A flag displaying the Marriott company logo was found at Ground Zero in December 2001, and was displayed in a glass case at the site over the next few months. The case honored the hotel's employees with the plaque:

"Our Spirit to Serve

From sacrifice ... honor

From adversity ... resolve

From grief ... remembrance"

The flag was eventually received by the 9/11 Memorial & Museum.

The Ladder 118 firetruck was recovered from Ground Zero within days of the attack, and their tools were recovered two months later. A photo of the firetruck, crossing the Brooklyn Bridge to get to the World Trade Center after the second plane crash, became an iconic image of 9/11. It was taken by Aaron McLamb from his 10th-floor workplace in Brooklyn, who brought the photo to the firehouse a week later. It was then published on the front page of the New York Daily News for October 15, 2001. Pete Davidson starred in the 2020 film, The King of Staten Island, loosely based on his father's service on 9/11 as part of the crew of that firetruck.

The hotel, and those who survived the 9/11 attacks within it, were featured in the documentary film Hotel Ground Zero, which premiered on September 11, 2009, on the History Channel. Some survivors only found out after watching the documentary that others they had met during the attacks were still alive. The survivors have reunited near or at the hotel site multiple times. As of 2011, there was a "Marriott Hotel 9/11 memorial group" that helped survivors get in contact with each other. In 2013, there was charity run in the area to honor Ruben Correa, a firefighter who died as a part of the group on the 21st floor.
