= Masayuki Nagare =

Japanese sculptor (1923–2018)

- 流 政之 (Nagare Masayuki)
- Born: February 14, 1923; Nagasaki, Japan
- Died: July 7, 2018 (aged 95)
- Education: Ritsumeikan University (incomplete)
- Known for: Modernist sculpture, stone carving
- Notable work: Cloud Fortress, Sakimori (Frontier Guardian), Receiving (受 Ju), Transcendence (The Banker's Heart)
- Style: Modernism, influenced by Shinto, Zen Buddhism, and Japanese martial arts
- Father: Kojuro Nakagawa (founder of Ritsumeikan University)

Sakimori (Frontier Guardian), black granite sculpture by Masayuki Nagare, 1989, Honolulu Museum of Art

Masayuki Nagare (流 政之, Nagare Masayuki; February 14, 1923 – July 7, 2018) was a modernist Japanese sculptor, nicknamed "Samurai Artist" for his commitment to traditional Japanese aesthetics. He was born in 1923 in Nagasaki to Kojuro Nakagawa, the founder and president of Ritsumeikan University in Kyoto. As a teenager, he received training in the martial arts of a samurai, particularly swordsmanship, and lived in several temples in Kyoto, where he observed the patterns of rocks, plants, and water created by traditional landscape artists.

In 1942, he enrolled at Ritsumeikan University, where he studied Shinto and was apprenticed to a master swordsmith. He left university in 1943 to join the Imperial Japanese Navy and did not return to complete his studies. Nagare served as a Zero Fighter pilot in the Pacific War. After the War, he traveled all over Honshu Island until the mid-1950s, witnessing the desolation of the ruined countryside, developing a thorough understanding of the Japanese landscape, and becoming interested in local crafts such as pottery. His fascination with graveyard tombstones that had survived wartime bombing led to his longtime choice of stone as his preferred medium.

Nagare's art is strongly influenced by Shinto, Zen Buddhism, and traditional Japanese martial arts. His principal stone-carving techniques include warehada ("cracked skin" or "broken texture"), in which the surface is left rough, with visible chisel marks, and shinogi awase ("ridges joined together"), which describes the meeting of two highly polished surfaces. Some of his works exhibit the contrast between the two techniques. His sculptures' clean lines often follow the subtle curvature of Japanese swords.

Nagare's works include Cloud Fortress, which survived the 9/11 attacks at the World Trade Center (New York City) but was destroyed in the rescue and recovery efforts, Sakimori (Frontier Guardian) installed in the Honolulu Museum of Art, Hamaritsurin Garden in Seto Ohashi Commemorative Park (Kagawa Prefecture, Japan), Receiving (受 Ju) stored at the Museum of Modern Art in New York City, and Transcendence (informally called The Banker's Heart by locals) installed in A.P. Giannini Plaza at 555 California Street (formerly the Bank of America building) in San Francisco, California. He died in July 2018 at the age of 95.
