= List of ambassadors of Slovenia to the United States =

Coordinates: 38°54′55.3″N 77°3′12.5″W

Ambassador of Slovenia to the United States Embassy of Slovenia in Washington, D.C.
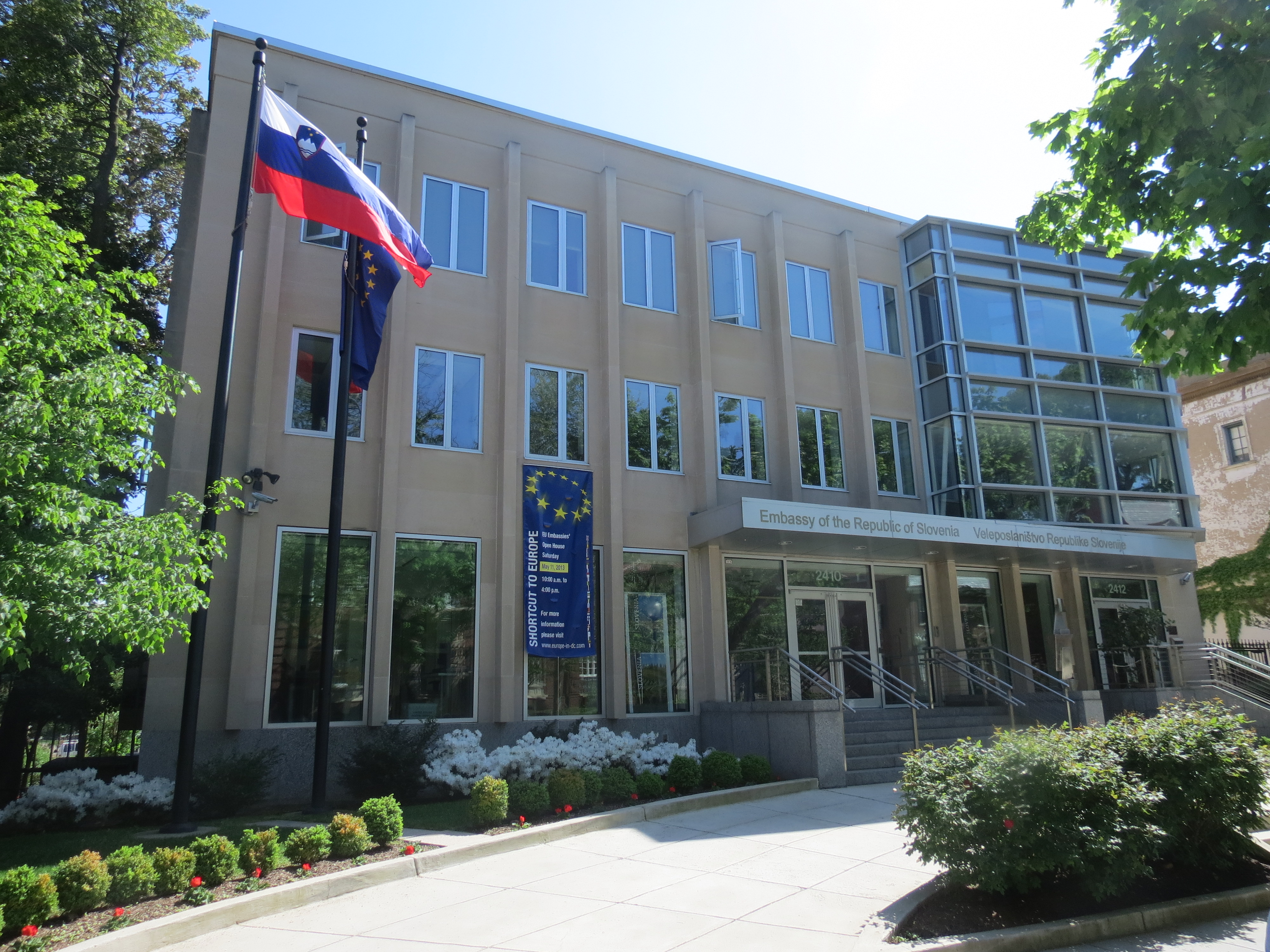
- Inaugural holder: Ernest Petrič
- Formation: November 19, 1992

The Slovene ambassador in Washington, D. C. is the official representative of the Government in Ljubljana to the Government of the United States.

== List of representatives ==
Diplomatic agrément	Diplomatic accreditation	Ambassador	Observations	Prime Minister of Slovenia	President of the United States	Term end
August 11, 1991			Diplomatic Relations established between U.S. and Slovenia	Lojze Peterle	George H. W. Bush	
August 1, 1992			Embassy opened	Janez Drnovšek	George H. W. Bush	
September 24, 1992	November 19, 1992	Ernest Petrič		Janez Drnovšek	George H. W. Bush	
November 3, 1997	November 12, 1997	Dimitrij Rupel		Janez Drnovšek	Bill Clinton	
May 30, 2000	September 5, 2000	Davorin Kračun		Andrej Bajuk	Bill Clinton	
August 27, 2004	September 15, 2004	Samuel Žbogar		Janez Drnovšek	George W. Bush	
May 26, 2009	July 20, 2009	Roman Kirn		Borut Pahor	Barack Obama	
September 6, 2013	September 17, 2013	Božo Cerar	(*October 16, 1949)	Alenka Bratušek	Barack Obama	
	July 21, 2017	Stanislav Vidovič	(*Osijeku): From 2009 to 2013 he led the Embassy of the Republic of Slovenia in Slovakia	Miro Cerar	Donald Trump	
2020	2020	Tone Kajzer		Janez Janša	Donald Trump	June 1, 2022

== See also ==
- Slovenia–United States relations
