= American Academy in Rome =

Overseas research institution in Rome

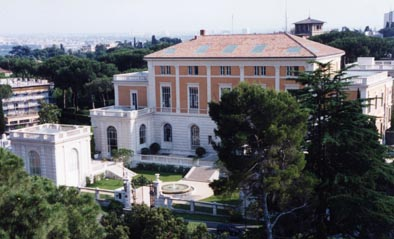
- American Academy in Rome in 1995
- Established: 1894
- Location: Rome, Italy; New York City, U.S.
- Type: Research center Arts institution
- Director: Aliza Wong
- President: Peter N. Miller
- Website: aarome.org

The American Academy in Rome is a research and arts institution located on the Gianicolo in Rome, Italy. The academy is a member of the Council of American Overseas Research Centers.

== History ==
=== 19th century ===
In 1893, a group of American architects, painters and sculptors met regularly while planning the fine arts section of the 1893 World's Columbian Exposition in Chicago. The group discussed the idea of forming an American school for artists in Europe as a place for American artists to study and further their skills. Led by Charles F. McKim of architectural practice McKim, Mead & White, they decided that Rome, which they considered a veritable museum of masterpieces of painting, sculpture and architecture throughout the ages, would be the best location for the school. The program began with institutions such as Columbia University and University of Pennsylvania, who would provide scholarships to artists to fund their travel to Rome. In October 1894 the American School of Architecture opened temporarily at the Palazzo Torlonia; directed by Austin W. Lord, it had three fellows, one visiting student, and a library with one volume. In July 1895, the program moved into the larger Villa Aurora. Renting space out to the American School of Classical Studies and the British & American Archeological Society Library, and financial contributions from McKim, allowed for the school to remain open.

In 1895, the American School of Architecture in Rome was incorporated in New York state and 10 shares of capital stock were issued. Despite fund-raising efforts and the American School of Classical Studies pulling out of Villa Aurora, the organization struggled financially. McKim made up for the financial loss with his personal funds. These struggles caused the American School of Architecture to restructure and base their program on the French Academy. In June 1897, the institution dissolved itself and formed the American Academy in Rome. Among its incorporators was Charles Moore.

The Academy introduced bills to the U.S. Congress to make it a "national institution," which was successful.

=== 20th century ===
In 1904, the Academy moved into Villa Mirafiori, which was soon purchased and renovated. They formed an endowment, which raised over a million dollars, designating those having donated over $100,000 as founders. Founders included McKim, Harvard College, The Carnegie Foundation, J.P. Morgan, J.P. Morgan Jr., John D. Rockefeller Jr., The Rockefeller Foundation, William K. Vanderbilt, and Henry Walters. Ever since, the American Academy has always been primarily privately financed. Financing comes from private donations and grants from the National Endowment for the Arts and National Endowment for the Humanities.

In 1912, the American School of Classical Studies in Rome merged with the Academy, giving the Academy two wings: one that focuses on fine art and one on classical studies. Women were a part of the School of Classical Studies, but were not permitted participation in the School of Fine Arts until after World War II. Since 1914, Joseph Brodsky, Aaron Copland, Nadine Gordimer, Thornton Wilder, Mary McCarthy, Philip Guston, Frank Stella, William Styron, Michael Graves, Robert Venturi, Robert Penn Warren, Oscar Hijuelos and Elizabeth Murray, among others, have come to the Academy for inspiration. More recent fellows include artists Firelei Báez, Nari Ward, Rochelle Feinstein, Sanford Biggers, Roberto Lugo and Daniel Joseph Martinez, writers Anthony Doerr, Alexandra Kleeman and Kirstin Valdez Quade, composers Christopher Cerrone, Pamela Z and Andy Akiho, architect Germane Barnes, and filmmaker Garrett Bradley.

In her tenure as president from 1988 to 2013, Adele Chatfield-Taylor helped restore the Academy's McKim, Mead & White building, at a cost of $8.2 million, and oversaw a capital campaign in which the institution's endowment grew to $100 million. She also brought on Alice Waters to create the Rome Sustainable Food Project, which brings chefs from the United States to explore Italian sustainable food traditions and to cook for the Academy guests.

=== 21st century ===
Mark Robbins, a 1997 Fellow, became president and CEO of the Academy in January 2014. His tenure has seen the American Academy in Rome become more diverse and globally facing, and he launched new public programming in the United States. As of July 1, 2023, Peter N. Miller is the president of the American Academy in Rome.

== Programs ==
The Academy serves as a "home" to visiting U.S. scholars and artists who have been awarded the Rome Prize. Given each year to around 30 (15 artist and 15 scholars) of more than 1,000 applicants, the Rome Prize is awarded for work in the following fields: classical studies, ancient studies, medieval studies, modern Italian studies, architecture, design, historic preservation, art conservation, landscape architecture, musical composition, visual art, and literature. The Rome Prize includes terms that range from six months to two years fellowships at the academy; a stipend ($16,000 for half-year and $30,000 for full-year fellowships); and work and living space at the 11-acre campus.

The 2023/2024 Rome Prize cycle included Kamrooz Aram, Nao Bustamante, Zachary Fabri, Jeanine Oleson, and Dread Scott.

The American Academy in Rome also has a prestigious residency program, where international leaders in disciplines represented by the Rome Prize are invited to come to the Academy to work and serve as informal mentors. Recent residents have included prominent writers Don Delillo, Ayad Akhtar, André Aciman, Anna Deavere Smith and Jhumpa Lahiri, artists Kara Walker, Yto Barrada, Teresita Fernández, Laurie Anderson, Gary Bukovnik, Julie Mehretu and Theaster Gates, designer Michael Bierut, architects Annabelle Selldorf, Jeanne Gang and David Adjaye, composers Nico Muhly, David Lang (also a Fellow) and Tania León, and scholars Lynn Meskell, Mary Beard, Shadi Bartsch, David Kertzer, David Nirenberg and David McCullough.

In addition to Rome Prize fellows and residents, visiting scholars and artists live and work at the Academy for varying periods.

== Governance and leadership ==
The American Academy in Rome is a 501(c)(3) nonprofit organization that was incorporated by U.S. Congress in 1905 (An Act of Congress to incorporate the American Academy in Rome, approved March 3, 1905). Its operations are financed privately, through the support of individual donors, foundations, private colleges and universities, and funds from its endowment. It has a board of trustees.

The American Academy in Rome is led by the president and CEO, Peter N. Miller. Until 1971, the president was an unsalaried position held by the chairmen of the board of trustees. In 1971, the administrative structure was changed in recognition of the need for a professional staff in the U.S., and the position of president and CEO was separated from that of chair of the board of trustees.

Additionally, the American Academy in Rome has a director in Rome, who reports to the president, which is usually a tenured academic who is "lent" from their home institution to serve as director for a term of three years. Aliza Wong was named director in 2022, becoming the first woman of color to serve as director in the institution's 128-year history.

=== List of presidents ===
- Charles Follen McKim (1894–1909) – first president
- William Rutherford Mead (1910–1928)
- Charles A. Platt (1928–1933)
- John Russell Pope (1934–1937)
- James Kellum Smith (1938–1958)
- Michael Rapuano (1958–1959)
- Rensselaer Lee (1969–1971)
- Henry T. Rowell (1971–1974)
- Harold C. Martin (1974–1977)
- Bill N. Lacy (1977–1980)
- Calvin G. Rand (1980–1984)
- Sophie C. Consagra (1984–1988)
- John T. Sargent (1988)
- Adele Chatfield-Taylor (1988–2013)
- Mark Robbins (2014–2023)
- Peter N. Miller (2023–present)

=== List of directors ===
- Jesse Benedict Carter (1913–1917) – first director
- Gorham Phillips Stevens (1917–1932)
- James Monroe Hewlett (1932–1934)
- Chester Holmes Aldrich (1935–1940)
- No director during World War II (1940–1945)
- William Bell Dinsmoor (appointed acting director, 1944, but was unable to take up the post and resigned in 1945)
- Charles Rufus Morey (1945–1946) (acting director)
- Laurance P. Roberts (1946–1960)
- Richard Arthur Kimball (1960–1965)
- Frank Edward Brown (1965–1969)
- Reginald Allen (1969–1970 (acting director)
- Bartlett H. Hayes Jr. (1970–1973)
- Frank Edward Brown (1973–1974) (acting director)
- Henry A. Millon (1974–1977)
- John D'Arms (1977–1980)
- Sophie C. Consagra (1980–1984)
- Jim Melchert (1984–1988)
- Joseph Connors (1988–1992)
- Caroline Bruzelius (1994–1997)
- Lester K. Little (1997–2005)
- Carmela Vircillo Franklin (2005–2010)
- Christopher Celenza (2010–2014)
- Kimberly Bowes (2014–2017)
- John Ochsendorf (2017–2020]
- Avinoam Shalem (2020–2021)
- Elizabeth Rodini (2021–2022) (acting director)
- Aliza Wong (2022–present)

== Site ==
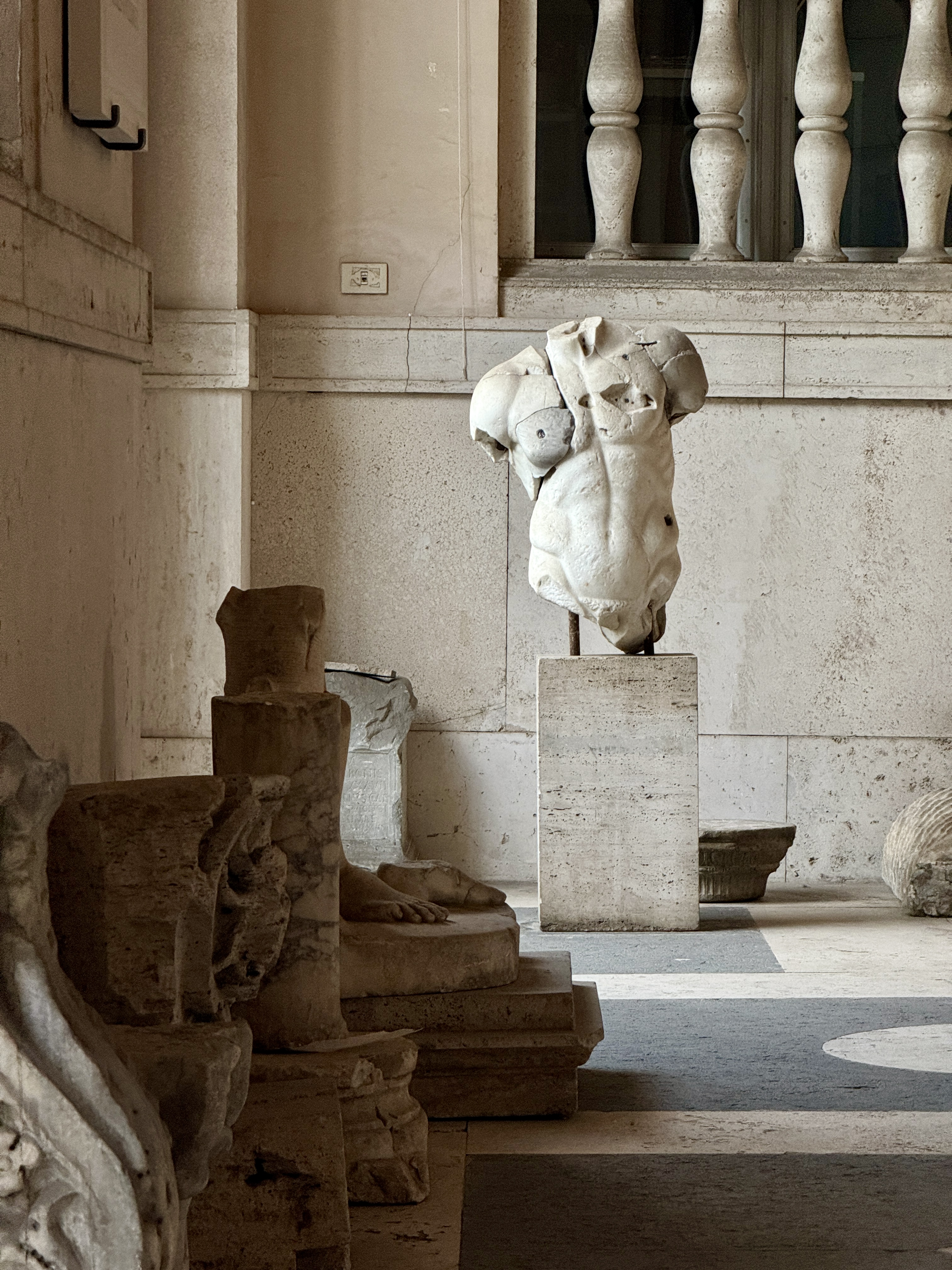
Atrium of the American Academy in Rome, featuring a Polykletian male torso

The Academy is housed in several buildings. The main building was designed by the firm of McKim, Mead, and White (their only building in Europe) and opened in 1914. Under the floor of the main building's basement lies a segment of the Aqua Traiana that was discovered in 1912–1913. The courtyard has a fountain designed by sculptor Paul Manship. The 2011 Driehaus Prize winner and New Classical architect Michael Graves designed the rare books library in 1996.

The Academy also owns the Villa Aurelia, a country estate built for Cardinal Girolamo Farnese in 1650. The building served as Giuseppe Garibaldi's headquarters during the French siege of Rome in 1849. It was heavily damaged during the assault, but it was restored. It was then purchased by Philadelphia heiress Clara Jessup Heyland. She died in 1909, bequeathing the villa to the Academy in her will.

== Archaeology ==
A portion of the aqueduct Aqua Traiana and the ruins of the watermills fed by the aqueduct are on the grounds of the Academy. From the third to the sixth century CE, the Aqua Traiana carried water to operate a number of water mills used for grinding grain, mostly wheat, into flour, to make bread, the most important item in the Roman diet. The ancient city of Rome had to import large amounts of grain from Egypt, North Africa, and Sicily to feed its population, estimated at one million people at its peak. The mills on Janiculum Hill and on the site of the Academy were the second largest complex of water mills known in the ancient world. The provision of grain to the residents of Rome was called the cura annonae. The aqueduct and the watermills were excavated in the 1990s.
