= Cerar =

Cerar is a surname. Notable people with the surname include:

- Božo Cerar (born 1949), Slovenian diplomat
- Franci Cerar, Slovenian science fiction writer
- Luka Cerar (born 1993), Slovenian footballer
- Miroslav Cerar (gymnast) (born 1938), Slovenian lawyer, gymnast and Olympic gold medalist and father of Miroslav Cerar Jr.
- Miroslav Cerar (politician) (born 1963), Slovenian lawyer and politician, son of Miroslav Cerar Sr.

== See also ==
- Cerar cabinet, 12th Cabinet of Slovenia
