= Slovenia–United States relations =

- Slovenia: United States

Diplomatic mission
- Embassy of Slovenia, Washington, D.C.: Embassy of the United States, Ljubljana

The United States has maintained an official presence in Slovenia since the early 1970s, when the United States Information Agency (USIS) opened a library and American press and cultural center in Ljubljana. From its opening through 1992, the American Center worked to develop closer grassroots relations between the United States and the people of the then-Socialist Republic of Slovenia, a constituent republic of the Socialist Federal Republic of Yugoslavia. On December 23, 1990, the Slovene people voted in a plebiscite to separate from greater Yugoslavia. On June 25, 1991, the new Republic of Slovenia officially declared its independence from the Federal Republic of Yugoslavia. A 10-day war commenced, during which Slovenian territorial troops fought off incursions by the Yugoslav People's Army. The United States formally recognized the new republic on April 7, 1992. To develop U.S. diplomatic relations with the new state, the United States opened a new Embassy in Ljubljana in August 1992. From the departure of Yousif Ghafari in January 2009 till November 2010, the U.S. Ambassador position was vacant. From November 2010 to 2015 it was held by Joseph A. Mussomeli. The Ambassador position is currently held by Jamie Harpootlian.

In the 2012 U.S. Global Leadership Report, 26% of Slovenes approved of U.S. leadership, with 52% disapproving and 22% uncertain. In a January 2026 poll, 19% of Slovenes showed approval for U.S. leadership.

In November 2016, the United States elected Donald Trump as President of the United States, making his Slovenia-born wife, Melania, the First Lady of the United States during the 2017-2021 first presidency of Donald Trump and again during his current second presidency.

== Diplomacy and politics ==
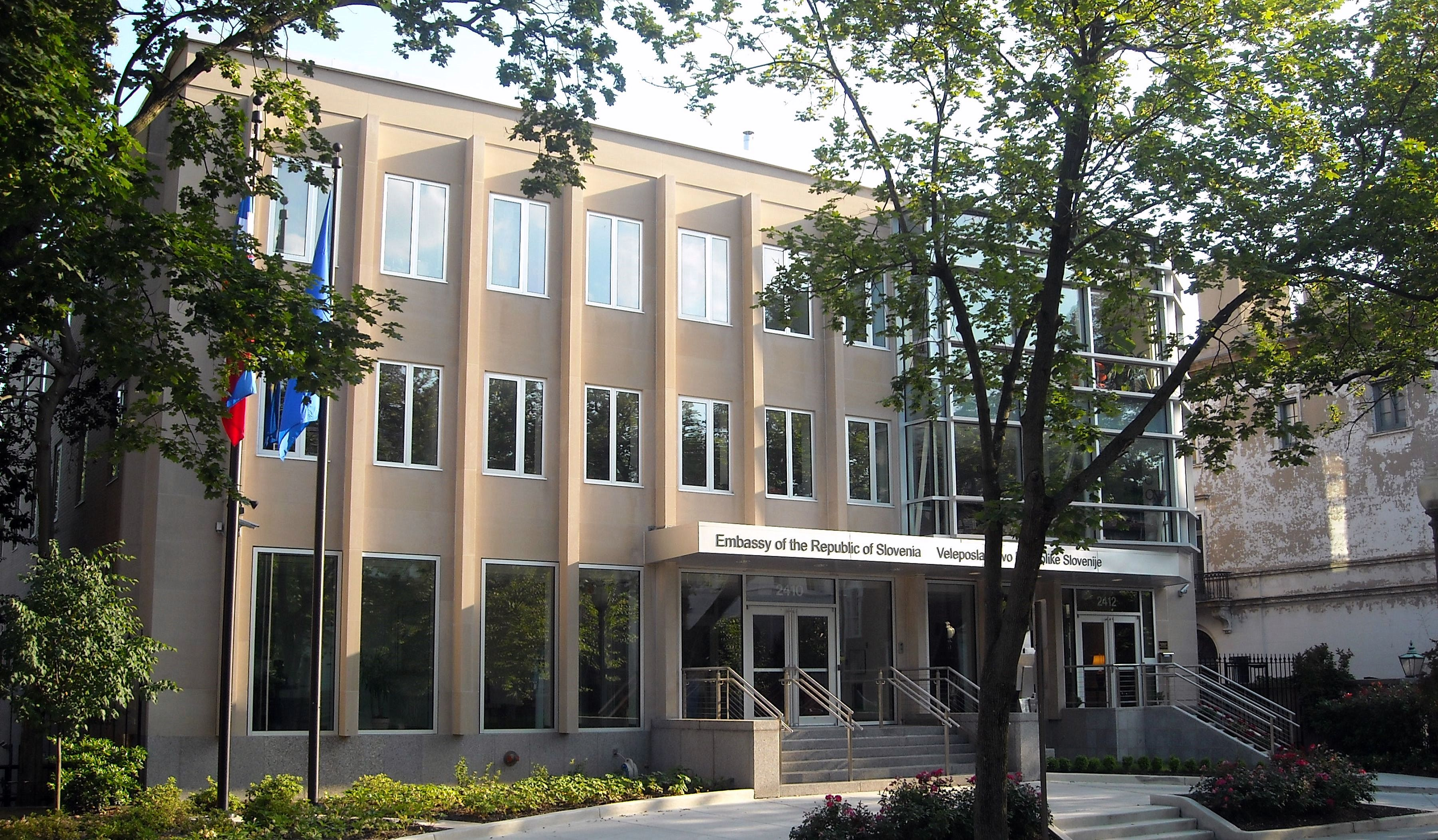
Embassy of Slovenia in Washington, D.C.

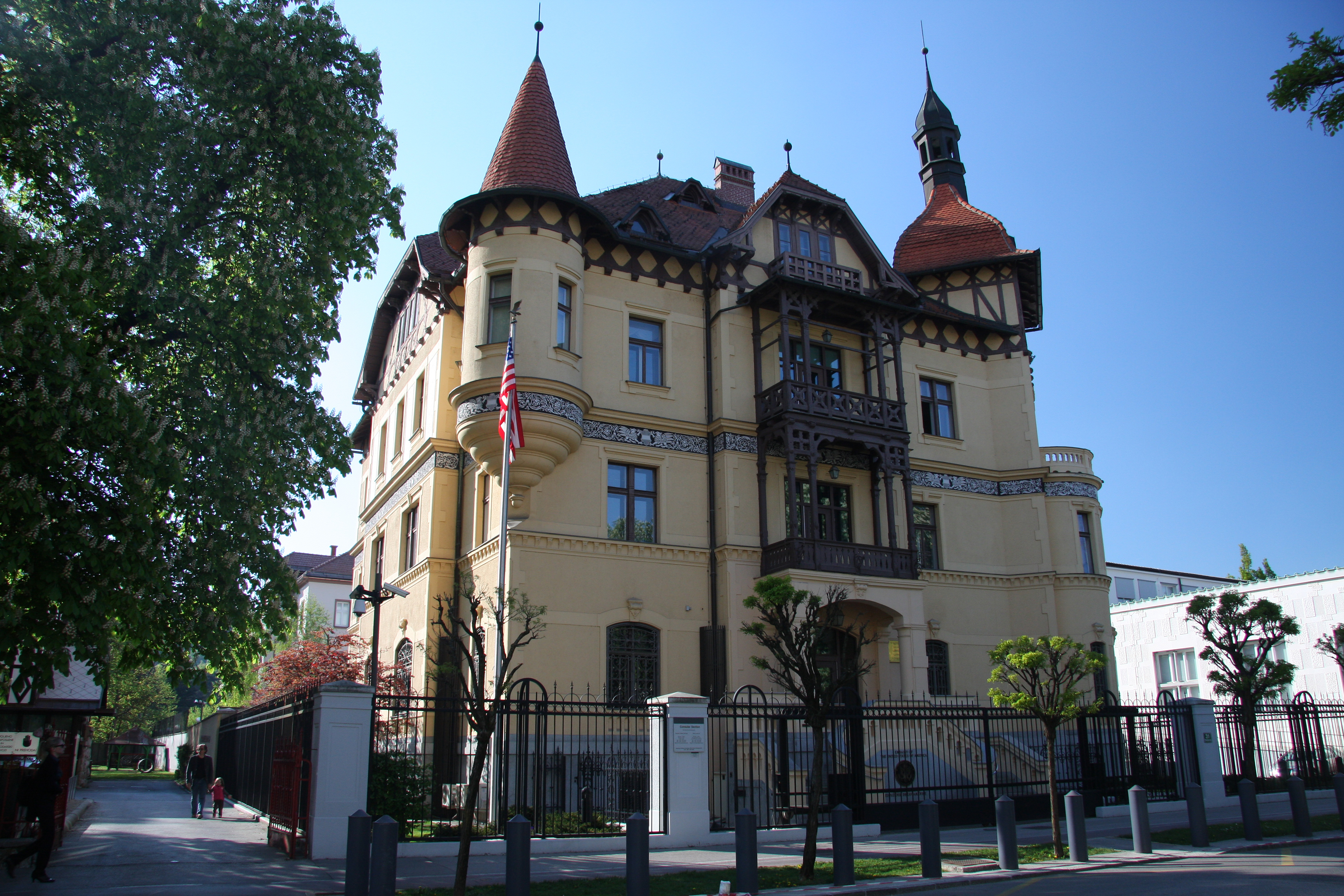
Embassy of the United States in Ljubljana

Slovenian and American heads of state have exchanged several visits since Slovenia's independence, including George W. Bush's visit in June 2008 for the European Union-U.S. summit during Slovenia's EU Presidency. A meeting on the highest level between Slovenia and the United States happened in Prague in April 2010, when the President of the United States Barack Obama and the Slovenian Prime Minister Borut Pahor attended a formal dinner of the leaders of the Central and Eastern Europe. Pahor called attention to the security situation in Bosnia and Herzegovina and Afghanistan and thanked the United States for its continuing support in strengthening trust among the Western Balkans leaders.

On 28 November 2010, the New York Times media company published information acquired by WikiLeaks that in 2009, the United States officials offered Slovenia a meeting with Barack Obama under the condition that the country accepts one of the Guantanamo Bay detainees. According to the data published by Tableau Software, there were 947 leaked cables related to Slovenia. On 29 November 2010, the Slovenian Ministry of Foreign Affairs denied any conditioning of the State Department with the acceptance of the Guantanamo detainees and said the cable mentioning the bargain is unknown to them. Slovenian media reported the Government of Slovenia had been discussing the acceptance of one Guantanamo detainee and that it had been in the process of preparing the legislation needed to allow it to accept detainees from Guantanamo. The ambassador Mussomeli stated there was no bargaining among the states.

On 7 February 2011, the Slovenian Prime Minister Pahor started his visit in the United States. In the three-day visit he met several Democrats, among them Tom Harkin and Joseph Biden and met for a short time with the President Barack Obama in the White House. He also met with several businessmen and held a lecture on the Johns Hopkins University about the relations between the United States and the European Union. The conversations with American politicians regarded the economic development in the United States and in Slovenia. The bilateral relations were assessed as very constructive. Pahor was accompanied by the Slovenian foreign minister Samuel Žbogar who on 11 February attended the discussion in the United Nations Security Council about safeguarding international peace and security and met with the Secretary-General of the United Nations Ban Ki-moon.

== Economy ==
The United States is Slovenia's largest non-European trading partner. The U.S. imported $699.7 million of goods from Slovenia, and exported $305.5 million in 2014. Under the Support for Eastern European Democracy (SEED) Act, the U.S. provided technical assistance on enterprise competitiveness, banking and pension reform, competition policy, and debt restructuring. Reflecting the progress Slovenia has made in these areas, Slovenia was among the first transition countries to "graduate" from the SEED program. Slovenia is a member of the European Union and trade relations are subject to Slovenian, EU, and U.S. law.

== Military ==
Slovenia contributed assistance to the United States and NATO by facilitating the deployment of the Implementation Force and subsequently contributed helicopters, medical personnel, military police, and an infantry company to the Stabilisation Force (SFOR) and continues to be active in the European Union Force. The United States supported Slovenia's accession to NATO in March 2004 and continues to work with the Slovenian military to promote greater cooperation and interoperability with NATO forces. The U.S. European Command provides a liaison team that works with the Ministry of Defense full-time to develop greater familiarity with NATO structures and procedures. As of June 2008, Slovenia had 34 troops deployed in Bosnia and Herzegovina (ALTHEA, EUFOR, Joint Enterprise, NATO), 363 troops in the NATO Kosovo Force (KFOR), 65 Slovenian personnel with the International Security Assistance Force (ISAF) mission in Afghanistan, 2 instructors to the NATO Training Mission in Iraq, 14 troops in Lebanon (UNIFIL), 3 in Syria (UNTSO), 15 at the EU Mission in Chad, and 1 in the U.S. (CENTCOM, NATO). With strong U.S. support, Slovenia has developed the International Trust Fund as the demining instrument of choice in the Balkans and is expanding operations to include the Caucasus.

Slovenia also participates in several of the U.S. Office of Defense Cooperation's programs. The State Partnership Program allows access to experts within the state of Colorado on the full range of military-to-military, military-to-civilian and civilian-to-civilian activities between Slovenia and the U.S. The International Military Education and Training program provides military education and training in a professional and non-political manner, exposing foreign students to US professional military organizations. Training through the IMET program has been available to Slovenian Ministry of Defense employees and members of Slovenian Armed forces since 1993. To date, several hundred students have been trained in the US and in various seminars organized in Slovenia. Slovenia has also been an active participant in the U.S. Service Academies, a four-year military officer program, with 5 Military, 2 Air Force and 1 Naval Academy graduates in the Slovene Armed Forces.

== Travel and education ==
In October 1997, Slovenia joined the group of countries whose citizens enjoy the privilege of visa-free travel to the United States and American travelers receive mutual benefits in Slovenia. Approximately 17,000 Slovenes travel to the U.S. each year and an estimated 20,000 Americans visit Slovenia.

The Fulbright Program, funded by the U.S. government, sends 6-8 scholars and students to Slovenia from the U.S. every year, and hosts 6-8 scholars and students from Slovenia in the U.S.

== Culture ==
Benjamin Franklin's book Poor Richard's Almanack was the first translation of an English text into Slovene. It was translated in 1812 by Janez Nepomuk Primic (1785–1823). In the first half of the 19th century, the Slovenes came into their first true encounter with America and the United States by the writings of the missionary Frederick Baraga (1797–1868), active among the Ojibwe Indians in Michigan. In 1853, just one year after its original publication, two independent translations of the novel Uncle Tom's Cabin were independently published by the writer Franc Malavašič in Ljubljana and the priest Janez Božič in Graz. These started the since-then uninterrupted dialogue between American authors and Slovene translators and readers.

== See also ==
- Slovene Americans
- List of ambassadors of Slovenia to the United States
- List of ambassadors of the United States to Slovenia
- United States–Yugoslavia relations

== Notes ==
1. Central Intelligence Agency. World Factbook. Retrieved on 2009-02-25.
2. U.S. Embassy Ljubljana. Retrieved on 2009-03-09.
3. Embassy of the Republic of Slovenia, Washington. Retrieved on 2009-03-09.
4. U.S. Census Bureau. Retrieved on 2015-02-10.
5. U.S. Department of State. Retrieved on 2009-03-09.
6. Office of Defense Cooperation Slovenia. Retrieved on 2009-03-09.
