= Goldman Sachs Tower =

Goldman Sachs Tower can refer to the following two buildings in the New York metropolitan area, both housing Goldman Sachs offices:

- 30 Hudson Street, in Jersey City
- 200 West Street, in Manhattan
