= Mural (Julie Mehretu) =

2009 painting by Julie Mehretu

Mural (2009)
- Mural seen in the main lobby of 200 West Street in Lower Manhattan
- Artist: Julie Mehretu
- Year: 2009
- Medium: Ink and acrylic paint on canvas
- Movement: Abstract art
- Dimensions: 7.0 m × 24 m (23 ft × 80 ft)
- Location: New York City; 40°42′53.5″N 74°0′51″W
- Owner: Goldman Sachs

Mural is a 2009 large-scale mural painting made using ink and acrylic on canvas by the contemporary Ethiopian-American visual artist Julie Mehretu. The work was commissioned in 2007 by the American investment bank Goldman Sachs for the lobby of its new headquarters at 200 West Street in Lower Manhattan. The painting consists of a dynamic arrangement of intersecting abstract forms executed with the use of 215 colors, which draw upon images of trade routes, maps, and photographs related to the history of global economies and the financial industry.

Mehretu's concept for the design of the work was influenced by French historian Fernand Braudel's extensive study of Western capitalism, while the densely layered and contrasting forms interwoven into the composition of Mural allude to capitalism's complex, self-sustaining nature and illustrate the process of mapping the intricate network of global trade and communications. The mural was completed in 2009 at the cost of $5 million, primarily spent on fabrication costs and salaries for a team of studio assistants. Mehretu herself has described Mural as a "time capsule" of her artistic practice up until that point. The work is considered one of Mehretu's best-known paintings.

Mehretu's identity as an openly gay woman of color has led to interpretations of the mural's commission as a modern example of corporate patronage advocating for social and cultural diversity. However, the work has also faced controversy, particularly concerning Goldman Sachs's involvement in the 2008 financial crisis and its intention to commission a well-known minority artist to improve its public image. Critics and art historians debate whether the painting can be considered public art. While Mural can be seen from the street through the glass wall on West Street—highlighting its public visibility despite its placement in a private office building's lobby—the interior space of the building remains off limits to the general public.

== Background ==
Julie Mehretu is an Ethiopian-American visual artist known primarily for abstract paintings and prints based on maps, architectural plans, and depictions of historical sites in which she investigates the histories of cities, cultures, and civilizations within the global context. According to art historian Elizabeth K. Mix, Mehretu "simultaneously references and breaks from the history of abstract modernist painting" and in her work combines diverse cultural references that in addition to maps and historical documents, include corporate logos, art historical references, comics, as well as graffiti.

Mehretu embeds drawing into successive layers of her work, blurring the traditional hierarchy of media in which drawing was seen as a prerequisite to painting, but was a largely marginalized medium on its own. To that end, Mix states that the artist's practice "expresses a modernist, formalist orientation to visual composition". Mehretu sees her work as deeply personal, reflecting the influence of her father who was an Ethiopian geographer, her Jewish-American mother, the family's relocation from Ethiopia to Michigan during a period of political instability, and Mehretu's own later experience with diverse, global cultures. In her 2003 work titled Empirical Construction, Istanbul, for instance, the artist incorporates a variety of symbols alluding to the history of Istanbul ranging from the Byzantine Empire to the present, including a representation of the Hagia Sophia, into a multilayered "painting-drawing hybrid" composition. Writing in 2021 for Slate, critic Fred Kaplan argues that Mehretu in her works has created a "new language for political art" through what he calls the artist's "strikingly original" abstract vocabulary, which moves beyond "satire and social realism", two styles historically popular among Western artists focusing on political narratives.

== History ==
=== Commission ===
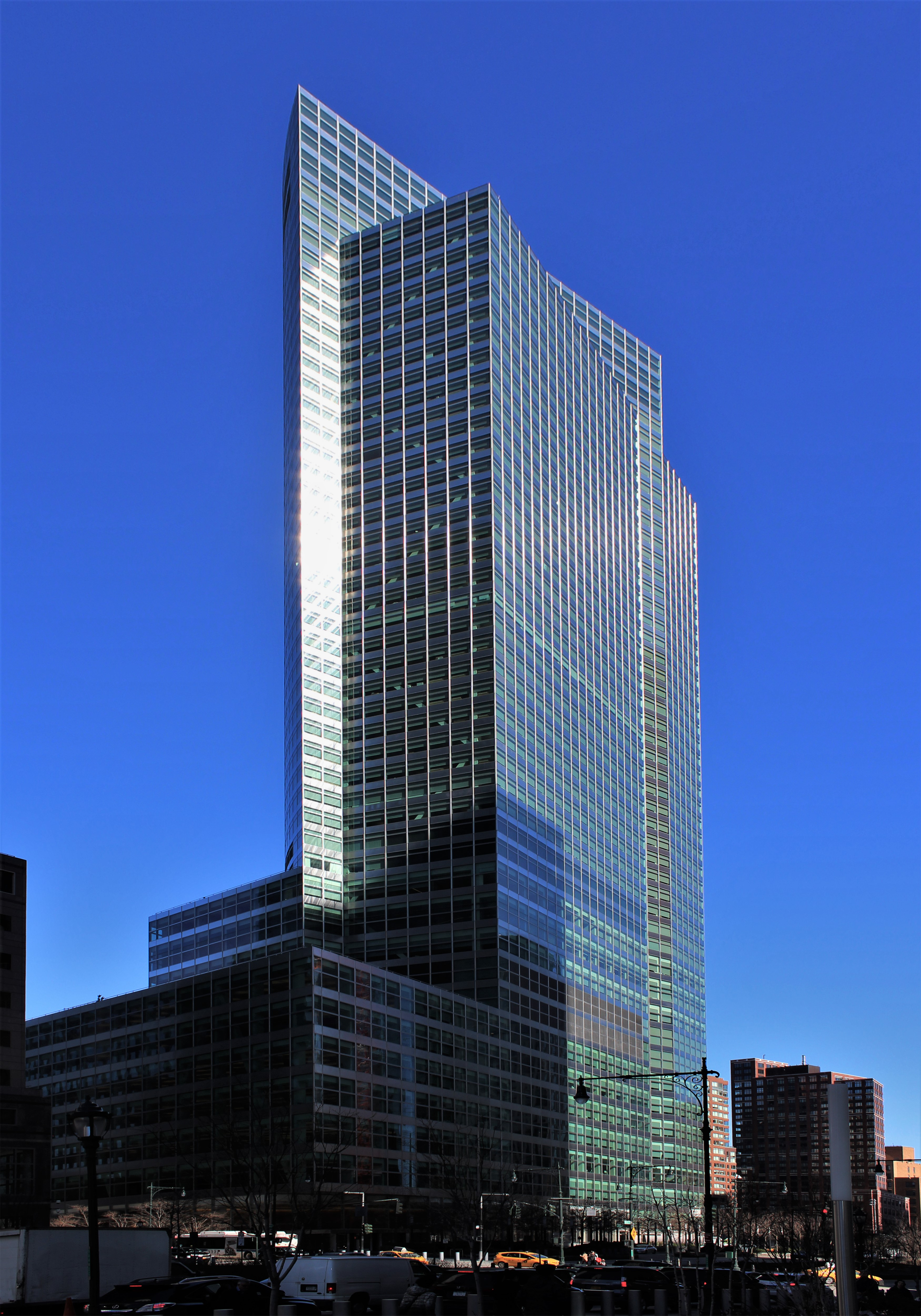
A view of the Goldman Sachs global headquarters 200 West Street in Lower Manhattan where Mehretu's Mural is installed

In 2007, the American investment bank Goldman Sachs sought art commissions for two sites of the lobby of its new corporate headquarters at 200 West Street in Lower Manhattan. The company wanted to select two artists, one of whom would create a work for the front lobby facing West Street with the other one given the space of the back lobby. Julie Mehretu submitted a proposal for a large-scale painting simply titled Mural inspired by the history of capitalism and incorporating the use of diverse abstract forms.

The artist described it as "the layered confluences and contradictions of the world economy in a mural" and supported her presentation to the bank executives with citations from the French historian Fernand Braudel's account of Western capitalism titled Civilization and Capitalism originally published in three volumes between 1967 and 1979. The mural's design was conceived with the help of two of Mehretu's friends: Lawrence Chua, an architectural historian and novelist, and Beth Stryker, an architect. Mehretu's proposal was successful and she was selected to commission the work of the building's front lobby. The work was completed in 2009 and cost $5 million, the vast majority of which went into the costs of fabrication, including salaries for up to 30 studio assistants.

=== Design ===
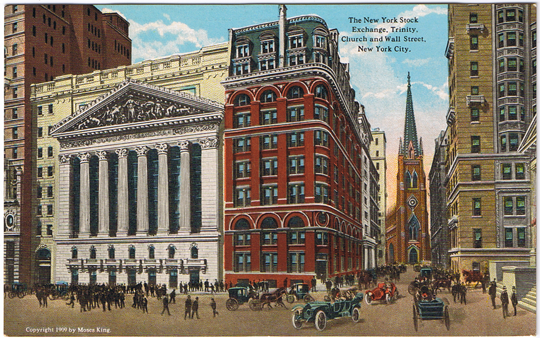
A postcard titled The New York Stock Exchange, Trinity Church, and Wall Street, New York City from 1909. Mehretu used old depictions of various financial centers, including the New York Stock Exchange.

The painting was completed using 215 different colors, multiple layers of drafted plans, and precise application of ink and sprayed acrylic paint, on a large-scale canvas measuring 23 by 80 feet. Art historian Richard Shiff describes Mehretu's design proposal as consisting of "four interactive layers of imagery" inspired by archival research removing them from their historical context and then transposing them into the painting. The first layer includes what Mehretu described as "time and mapping: exchanges between nations and flows within networks". The second consisted of thousands of drawings depicting "banks, bourses, and exchanges, markets and fairs, factories and warehouses, fortifications and towers". Third layer relied on "free drawing and gesture", which animated the composition and intervened into the earlier imagery with what Shiff terms as "the spontaneity of human feeling". The fourth and final layer included what Mehretu considers "the abstracted color signage of the players of this world", ranging from decorations of early markets to modern logos and virtual imagery associated with the world of finance.

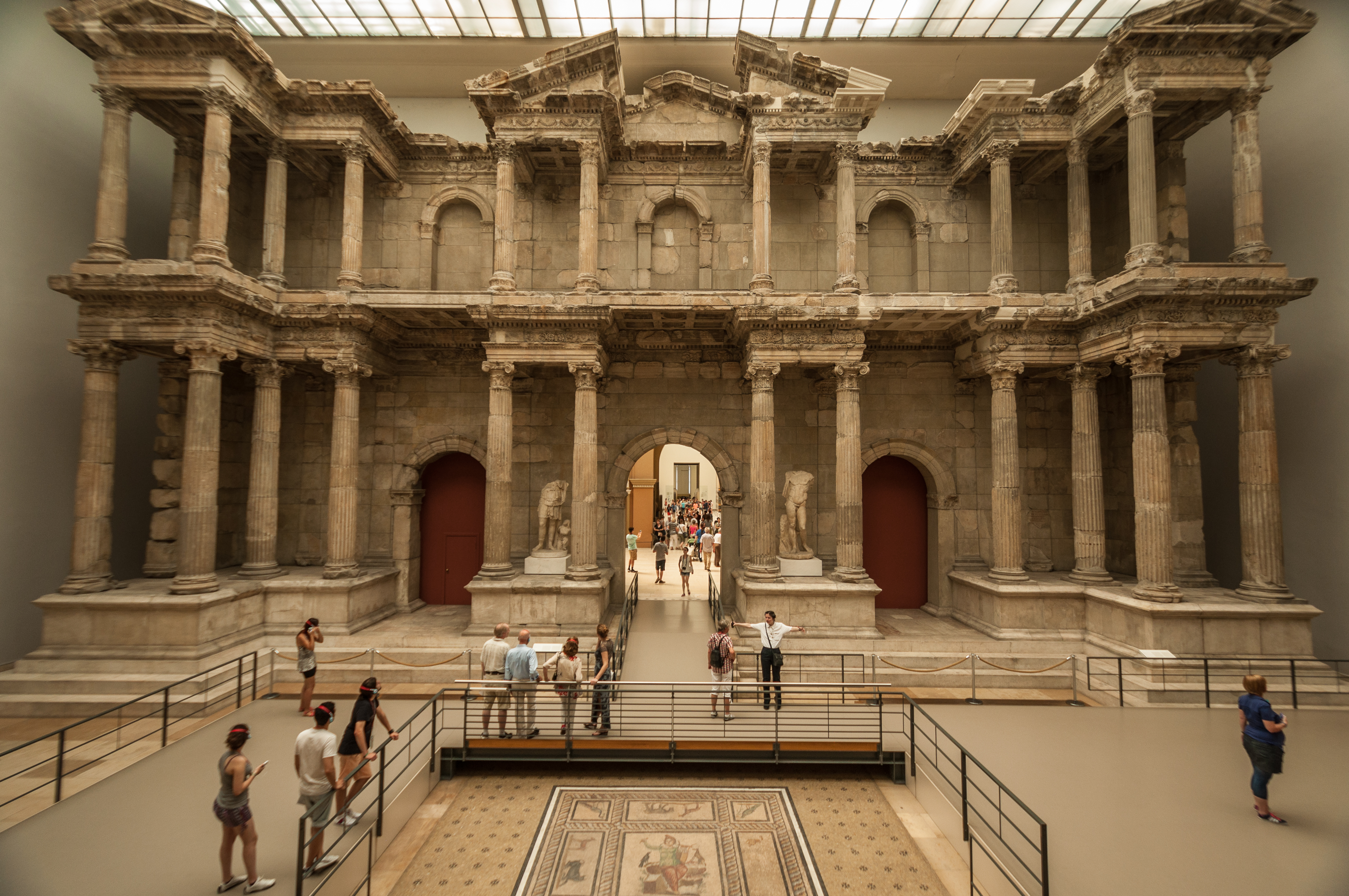
The Market Gate of Miletus from 2nd century AD was one of the ancient sites Mehretu incorporated into her design of Mural

Each incorporated a process of tracing and abstracting the visual content of various selected documents onto the picture plane. As an example of Mehretu's process, Shiff describes the artist's use of an archival postcard of the New York Stock Exchange building on Wall Street in Lower Manhattan from the 1920s which would be projected onto the canvas with an overhead projector to then trace it selectively as "a matrix for a schematic linear rendering of the building". Art historian Elizabeth Harney also notes that Mehretu outlined in Mural representations of institutions connected to the history of Western imperialism and colonialism, including the New Orleans Cotton Exchange and an early "New England bank" that profited of trade networks, exploitation of natural resources, and slave labor. The artist also used depictions of ancient sites, including the Market Gate of Miletus, a Roman monument originally constructed in the 2nd century AD and currently part of the Pergamon Museum in Berlin.

Mehretu also considered the architectural space of 200 West Street and consulted the building's designer Henry N. Cobb, an American architect of Pei Cobb Freed & Partners. Critic Calvin Tomkins describes Cobb as "a strong supporter of art in architecture" and notes that Cobb designed the building to be "responsive to its surroundings", recognizing that art in the main lobby was an essential part of the project. According to Shiff, Mehretu wanted the painting to be more than just an architectural embellishment. In one of the interviews, Mehretu asserted that Mural represented a "time capsule" of her artistic practice up until that point and called in an "Arc of work in a way". She also commented on the "physical, exhausting" process of working on a painting of such a large scale, which she completed in sections and saw as "very performative and very physical".

=== Reception and scholarship ===
Despite the work's placement in a lobby of a private office building, Mural can be seen from the street through the glass-walled lobby, leading several critics to consider the commission as an example of public art. When discussing the work, critic and novelist Jonathon Keats said that it depicted capitalism as "a self-perpetuating system that repels reform through its inconceivable internal logic". Sarah E. Lewis points out Mural's encyclopedic scope, which she interprets as an allegory of "the functioning of the capitalist economic system from its origination point". Other art historians have noted that the layered maps, trade routes, and architectural renderings are not discernible as images of any specific place. Instead, they tend to overtake the passerby "in a hub of global capital" and collapsing traditional linear perspective. Tomkins writes that the work includes "hundreds of precisely defined abstract shapes in saturated colors" and that the entire composition is marked by a "constant and enveloping" sense of movement. Shiff interprets one section of the composition as an homage to Richard Serra's Tilted Arc from 1981, a large-scale post-minimalist public sculpture commissioned for the Foley Federal Plaza in Lower Manhattan and later deinstalled in a move that was seen as highly controversial.

According to the American art historian Elizabeth Harney, Mehretu's Mural provides an idiosyncratic case of contemporary history painting because it "simultaneously commemorates and implicates its patron in the long histories of capitalist activity". Daniel Haxall argued that the commission of Mural along with Kehinde Wiley's collaboration with the sportswear company Puma in 2009 exemplified the evolution of contemporary corporate patronage to one that "promotes diversity and social commitment through their art programs". Philosopher and critic David Carrier criticized Goldman Sachs for apparent cause marketing, as the corporation ostensibly relied on a minority artist (a "high profile biracial lesbian") in order to improve its public image. He also questioned Mural's status as a work of public art, pointing out that it remains largely inaccessible to the general public who are not allowed to enter the lobby. Harney further notes that the work stirred controversy due to the fact that its patron was among the institutions "implicated in and maligned for" its role in the 2008 financial crisis. In a highly critical review published by The American Conservative, writer James McElroy called the work "remarkably ugly" and argued that Mural is "indicative of the candy-coating nihilism that is also pushing further into our lives".

== Sources ==
- Carrier, David (November 7, 2010). "Public Art and Its Discontents. Julie Mehretu at Goldman Sachs". ArtCritical: The Online Magazine of Art and Ideas.
- Erdos, Elleree (March–April 2015). "Reviewed Work: Myriads, Only By Dark (2014) Edition of 30 by Julie Mehretu". Art in Print. The Global Journal of Prints and Ideas. 4 (6): 22. JSTOR 26350687.
- Gagliardi, Susan Elizabeth; Gardner-Huggett, Joanna (2017). "Introduction to the Special Issue: Spatial Art History in the Digital Realm". Historical Geography. 45 (1): 17–36. doi:10.1353/hgo.2017.0015. ISSN 2331-7523. S2CID 155762970.
- George, Cassidy (March 26, 2021). "The Irreducible Julie Mehretu". The Cut.
- Harney, Elizabeth (2019). "Reimagining Global Modernity in the Age of Neo-Liberal Patronage: The History Paintings of Julie Mehretu". In Phillips, Mark Salber; Bear, Jordan (eds.). What Was History Painting and What Is It Now?. McGill-Queen's/Beaverbrook Canadian Foundation Studies in Art History. Vol. 28. Montreal: McGill-Queen's University Press. pp. 234–253. ISBN 978-0-7735-5895-3.
- Haxall, Daniel (2019). "From Bank Lobbies to Sportswear: Julie Mehretu, Kehinde Wiley, and the Shift in Corporate Patronage in the Twenty-First Century". In Jovanovich, Monica; Renn, Melissa (eds.). Corporate Patronage of Art and Architecture in the United States, Late 19th Century to the Present. New York: Bloomsbury Visual Arts. pp. 225–244. ISBN 978-1-5013-4376-6.
- Kaplan, Fred (March 25, 2021). "The Swirl of History". Slate. ISSN 1091-2339.
- Kazanjian, Dodie (September 4, 2017). "Julie Mehretu Started Her Majestic New Paintings Right After the Election". Vogue.
- Keats, Jonathon (April 26, 2021). "In A Thrilling Whitney Retrospective, Ethiopian-American Artist Julie Mehretu Maps A Radical New Path For Geopolitics". Forbes.
- Lewis, Sarah E. (2010). "Unhomed Geographies: The Paintings of Julie Mehretu". Callaloo. 33 (1): 219–222. doi:10.1353/cal.0.0591. ISSN 1080-6512. JSTOR 40732811. S2CID 161534574.
- McElroy, James (May 22, 2018). "Goldman Sachs Lobby Art Explains Everything That's Wrong With Our Elites". The American Conservative. ISSN 1540-966X.
- Mix, Elizabeth K. (April 11, 2022). "Mehretu, Julie". Grove Art Online. Oxford University Press. doi:10.1093/gao/9781884446054.article.t2093905. ISBN 978-1-884446-05-4.
- Roberts, Rebecca, ed. (2007). MoMA Highlights since 1980. New York: Museum of Modern Art. ISBN 978-0-87070-713-1.
- Sheets, Hilarie M. (August 3, 2017). "In an Unused Harlem Church, a Towering Work of a 'Genius'". The New York Times. ISSN 0362-4331.
- Shiff, Richard (2023). "Our Life in Signs". Richard Shiff: Writing after Art: Essays on Modern and Contemporary Artists. New York: David Zwirner Books. pp. 364–392. ISBN 978-1-64423-048-0.
- Tomkins, Calvin (March 22, 2010). "Big Art, Big Money". The New Yorker. ISSN 0028-792X.
- Woubshet, Dagmawi; Mehretu, Julie (2014). "An Interview with Julie Mehretu". Callaloo. 37 (4): 782–798. doi:10.1353/cal.2014.0173. ISSN 0161-2492. JSTOR 24265033. S2CID 162229034.
