= Embassy of Slovenia, Washington, D.C. =

Embassy of Slovenia
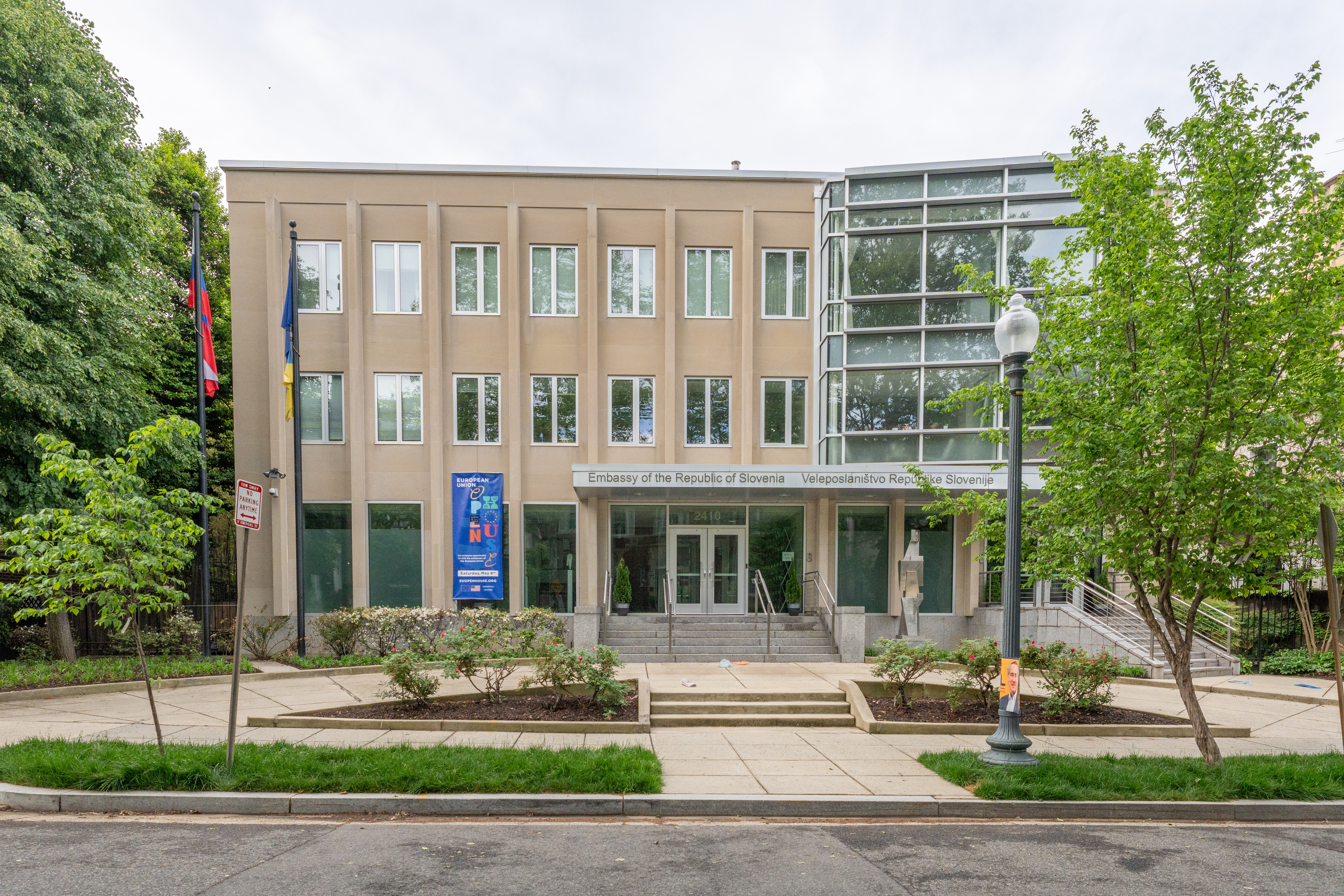
- Location: Washington, D.C.
- Address: 2410 California Street NW
- Coordinates: 38°54′55.3″N 77°3′12.5″W
- Ambassador: Iztok Mirošič
- Website: http://washington.embassy.si

The Embassy of Slovenia in Washington, D.C. is the Republic of Slovenia's diplomatic mission to the United States. The embassy in Washington is also responsible for representing Slovenia in Mexico. The chancery is located just off Embassy Row at 2410 California Street NW in the Kalorama neighborhood. Consular assistance is also provided by Slovenia's network of consulates in the U.S. and Mexico.

Slovenia's current ambassador to the United States is Tone Kajzer. Ambassador Kajzer presented his letter of credence to President Donald Trump in 2021. He also serves as ambassador to Mexico, Costa Rica, and Panama and as a permanent representative to the Organization of American States and the Caribbean Community.

== Slovenia–U.S. relations ==
Sculpture "The Sentinel""

The United States formally recognized Slovenia on April 7, 1992. Since Slovenia's independence, the United States and Slovenia have developed strong, cooperative relations and partnership on a broad range of issues, from promoting regional security to developing closer bilateral trade and investment ties.

== Cultural Cooperation ==
Concert by Lana Trotovšek at the Embassy's Gallery Space.

Every year the Embassy of Slovenia in Washington organizes a range of cultural, public diplomacy, educational and science events - all highlighted in the weekly Embassy's Newsletter and promoted through embassy's website, social, printed and even TV media. Premises of the embassy include a spacious reception hall, which also serves as a gallery space and a concert room. Anja Bukovec, Manca Ahlin, Miha Alujević, Artvento quintet, Boris Bizjak, Gary Bukovnik, Jože Domjan, Sabina Cvilak, Ištvan Išt Huzjan, Andrej Goričar, Matej Grahek, Mak Grgić, Meta Grgurevič, JAŠA, Luka Uršič, Bogdan Grom, Marko Hatlak, Arne Hodalič, Tadej Horvat, Žarko Ignjatović, Stane Jeršič and Barbara Jakše Jeršič, Barbara Jernejčič Fürst, Barbara Jurkovšek, Manca Juvan, Boštjan Korošec, Jiři Kočica, Lučka Koščak, Vlado Kreslin, Nejc Kuhar, Tone Kuntner, Megaron Chamber Choir, Octet9, Perpetuum Jazzile, Tomaž Izidor Perko, Nataša Prosenc, Jure Pukl, 4SAXESS quartet, Zora Stančič and Tanja Radež, SLOWIND, Ejti Štih, Zagreb Saxophone Quartet, Andrej Schlegel, Matej Sitar, Aleš Šteger, Tone Škerjanec, Lana Trotovšek, Juan Vasle, Teresa Velikonja Oaxaca, Žan Tetičkovič, David Vertačnik, Jože Vodlan, Miro Zupančič and Dragan Živadinov are some of the artists that performed or exhibited at the 2410 California Street, NW in Washington, D.C.. At its premises the embassy often also presents exhibitions curated by Slovenian museums; such as in the ongoing exhibition about Idria Lace by the Idrija Municipal Museum, the exhibition titled 'Far and Wide they Went, Their Ware Always at Hand' about Ribnica peddling curated by Ribnica Museum, the exhibition 'Jewish Soldiers of the Austria-Hungarian Army On The Isonzo Front' by Maribor Synagogue, and 'Million 289 Thousand 369', an exhibition curated by the Archives of the Republic of Slovenia on the 25th anniversary of the plebiscite for an independent Slovenia.

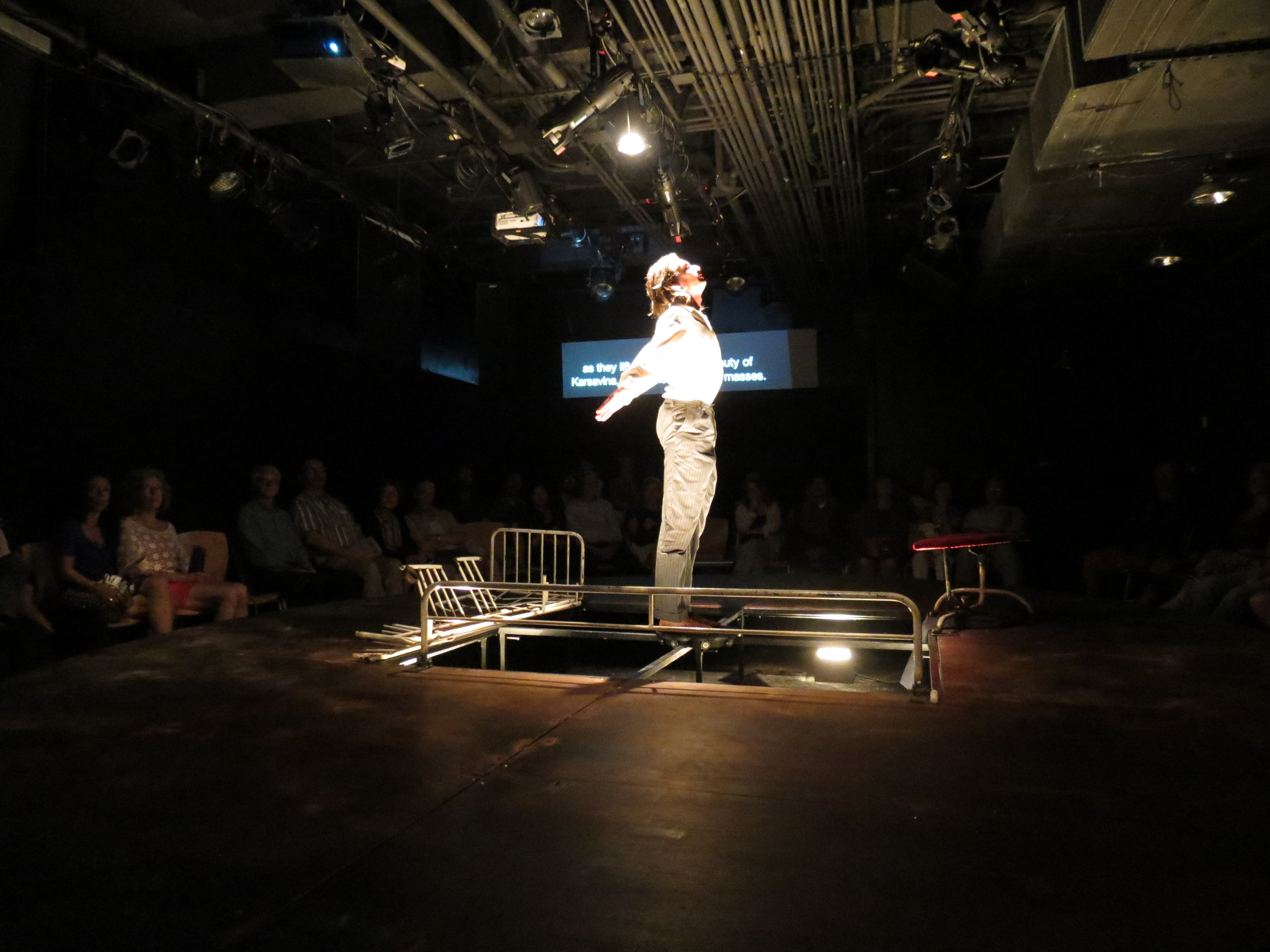
Primož Bezjak as Nijinsky in Nijinsky's Last Dance; Washington performance by Mladinsko Theatre.

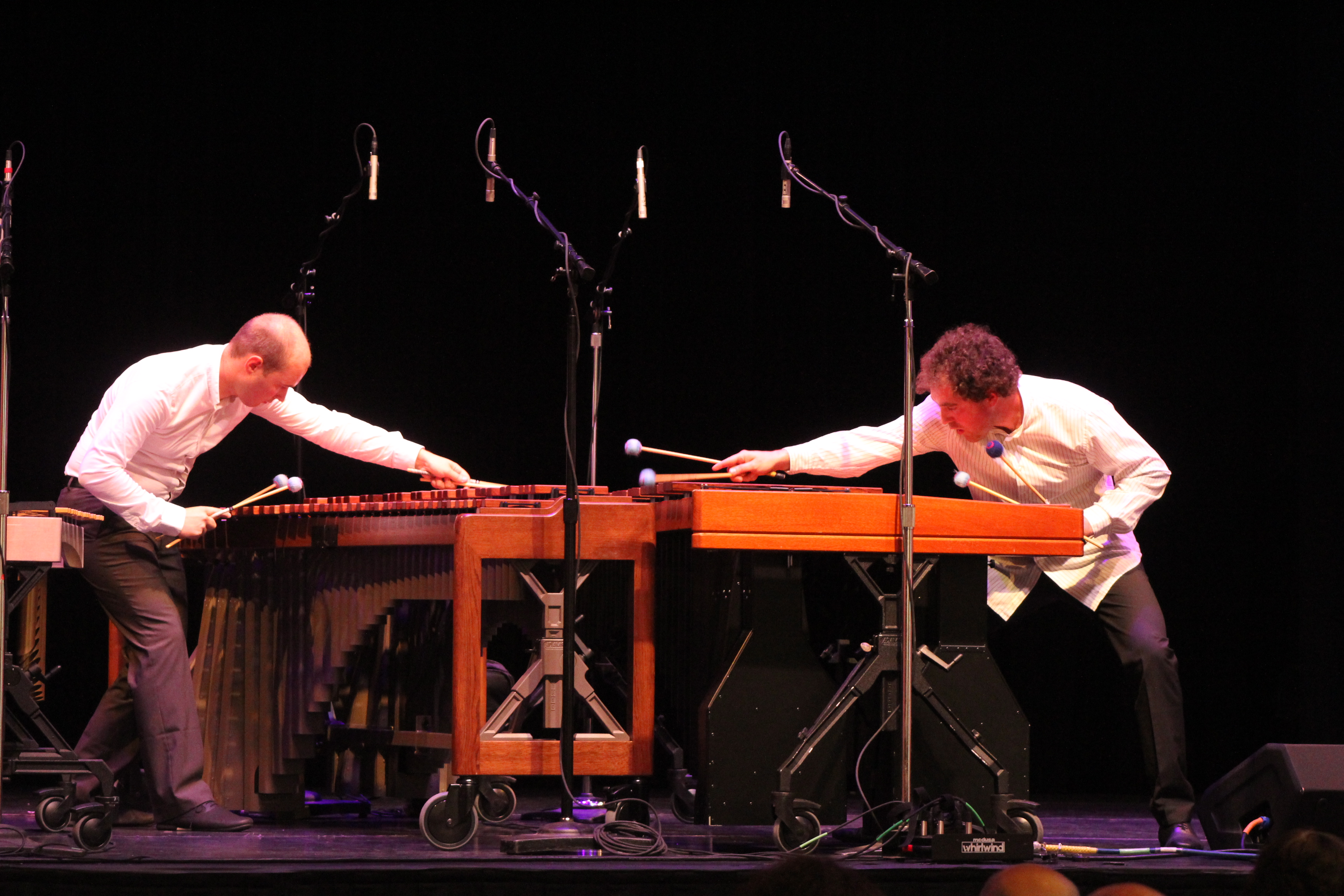
Concert by Duo Drumartica at the Kennedy Center.

Besides a series of cultural events at the embassy's space, which include concerts, film screenings, plays, panel discussions, lectures, wine tastings, cooking lessons, tourist promotions and at least five exhibitions a year, the embassy presents many of its events in collaboration with other embassies and consulates, non-governmental and nonprofit organizations, Slovenian societies and clubs in the U.S., universities and other partnering organizations, such as the Embassy Series, the Kennedy Center, U.S. Library of Congress, National Gallery of Art, Hill Center, Hillwood Museum and Gardens, Listner Auditorium, the Phillips Collection, International Club of DC, Word Artists Experiences etc. In the recent years percussionists Jože Bogolin and Simon Klavžar, saxophonists Jan Kus and Igor Lumpert, Carmina Slovenica choir, N'Toko, Grammatik, flutist Matej Zupan, clarinetist, Jože Kotar, trumpeter Franc Kosem, violinist Vasilij Meljnikov and Gorjan Košuta, violist Franc Avsenek, cellist Miloš Mlejnik and Sebastjan Bertoncelj, pianists Hinko Haas and Nejc Lavrenčič, soprano Irena Preda, multimedia artists Neja Tomšič, Irena Tomažin, Miha Ciglar and Martin Bricelj Baraga, writers and poets Evald Flisar, Aleš Šteger, Andrej Blatnik, Gabrijela Babnik, Tone Škerjanc, Jela Krečič, Maja Haderlap and Cvetka Lipuš, philosopher Slavoj Žižek, architects Marjetica Potrč and Dean Lah, film makers Darko Herič, Žiga Virc, Tina Lešničar, Davorin Marc, film curator Jurij Meden, directors Peter Petkovšek and theatres Mladinsko theatre, Zapik puppet theatre, Fru Fru puppet theatre and puppeteer Nika Solce, dancers Jurij Konjar and Mojca Majcen and others performed in Washington, New York or elsewhere in the U.S. with the support of the embassy, consulate general in Cleveland, Department/Lectorate of the Slovene language at Cleveland State University, and 13 honorary consuls in respective states of Colorado, California, Florida, Georgia, Hawaii, Illinois, Kansas Michigan, Minnesota, Pennsylvania, Tennessee and Texas. Just in 2016 the embassy organized around 140 events, trying to embrace all arts, from architectural showcases, film, sculpture, paintings, visual arts, dance, theatre and music. Many of them were dedicated to embrace the 25th anniversary of Slovenia's independence.

Zapik Puppet Theatre performing at the Kids Euro Festival in Washington.

Besides introducing Slovenian culture to the U.S. audiences, is the embassy also accredited in Mexico. With the assistance of honorary consuls in Mexico City and Guadalajara, Slovenian writers every year participate at the Guadalajara Book Fair, theatre groups perform at different festivals (such as Festival Cosmicómico de Teatro Alternativo in Zacatecas). In November and December 2016 curator Vasja Nagy presented Art in a Suitcase project in Mexico, which featured several Slovenian visual artists.

The Embassy of Slovenia also participates in annual cultural events organized in cooperation with the Delegation of the European Union in Washington, D.C. other EU member states’ embassies, non EU embassies, consulates, non-governmental and nonprofit organizations and universities. The most popular annual event presented in collaboration with other EU member states is EU Open House Day, with more than 4000 visitors in a span of six hours alone at the Embassy of Slovenia. Other bigger events annually presented in cooperation with other foreign embassies are Panorama Europe Film Festival every May, Euro Kids Festival every October, AFI EU Film Showcase every December and one month long festivals European Month of Culture in May and Francophonie festival in March. The Embassy of the Republic of Slovenia Washington is also an active member of two European Union National Institutes for Culture (EUNIC) clusters: the EUNIC Washington cluster and the EUNIC New York cluster, both dedicated to promote contemporary European culture in the U.S.

Panel discussion at the embassy presented in cooperation with Women Foreign Policy Group.

== Science and Education ==
In the field of education programs such as Fulbright, American Slovenian Educational Foundation and Kerže endowment funds enhance the cooperation between Slovenia and the U.S. The embassy regularly collaborates with VTIS Association and Society for Slovene Studies and has for the past 3 years organized Science and Educational Showcase for researchers, scientists and scholars.

== Embassy building ==
The embassy building in Washington DC is that of the former Embassy of Yugoslavia, built in 1961 on an empty lot purchased in 1958. Following the breakup of Yugoslavia, the building was allotted to Slovenia under the 2001 Agreement on Succession Issues, ratified by Slovenia in 2002 and in force since 2004. The building was renovated in 2006 on a design by Powe Jones Architects. It also includes the ambassadorial residence.

== List of consulates ==
The embassy is also ultimately responsible for the 13 regional consulates:[2]

1. Consulate General of the Republic of Slovenia in Cleveland, Ohio
2. Consulate of the Republic of Slovenia in Atlanta, Georgia (Honorary)
3. Consulate of the Republic of Slovenia in Denver, Colorado (Honorary)
4. Consulate of the Republic of Slovenia in Dearborn, Michigan (Honorary)
5. Consulate of the Republic of Slovenia in Lemont, Illinois (Honorary)
6. Consulate of the Republic of Slovenia in Honolulu, Hawaii (Honorary)
7. Consulate of the Republic of Slovenia in Miami Beach, Florida (Honorary)
8. Consulate of the Republic of Slovenia in Mission Hills, Kansas (Honorary)
9. Consulate of the Republic of Slovenia in Pittsburgh, Pennsylvania (Honorary)
10. Consulate of the Republic of Slovenia in San Francisco, California (Honorary)
11. Consulate of the Republic of Slovenia in St. Paul, Minnesota (Honorary)
12. Consulate of the Republic of Slovenia in Mexico City, Mexico (Honorary)
13. Consulate of the Republic of Slovenia in Guadalajara, Mexico (Honorary)

== List of Slovenian ambassadors to the United States ==
- Ernest Petrič (1991-1997)
- Dimitrij Rupel (1997-2000)
- Davorin Kračun (2000-2004)
- Samuel Žbogar (2004-2008)
- Roman Kirn (2009-2013)
- Božo Cerar (2013-2017)
- Stanislav Vidovič (2017–2020)
- Tone Kajzer (2020–2022)
- Iztok Mirošič (2023–danes)
