= 200 West Street =

Office skyscraper in Manhattan, New York

200 West Street (Goldman Sachs Tower)
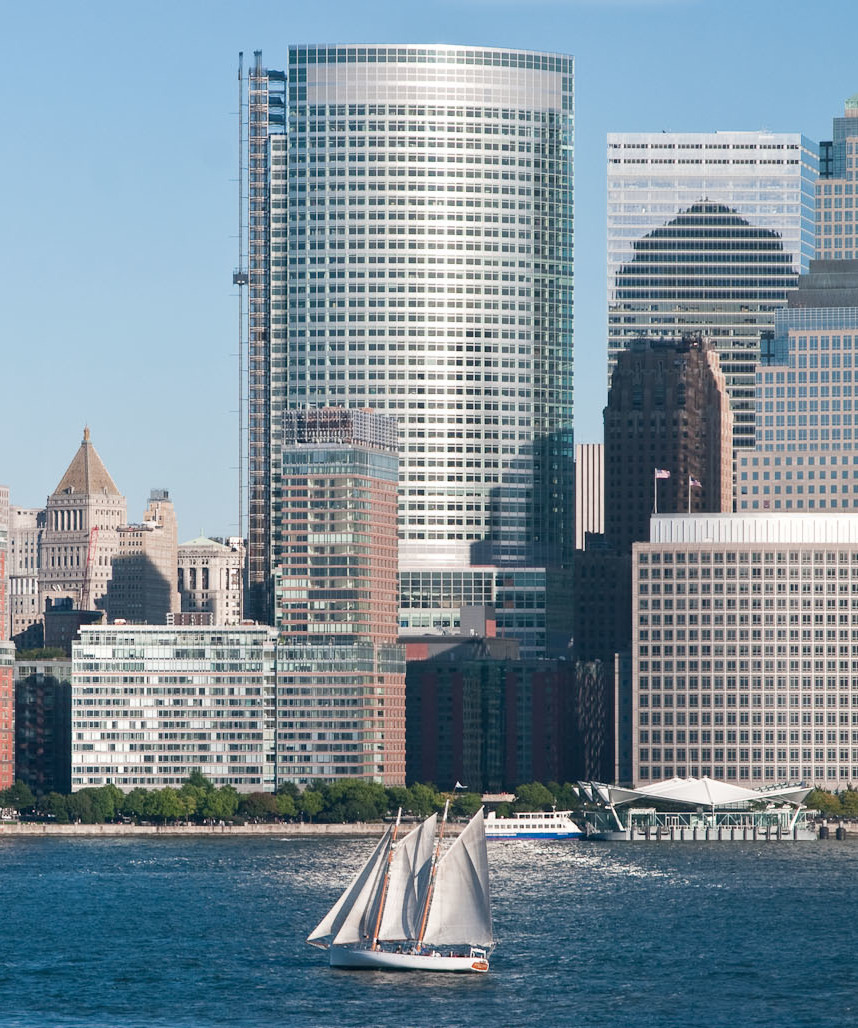
- as seen from the Hudson River (2010)

General information
- Status: Completed
- Type: Office
- Location: Manhattan, New York, U.S.
- Coordinates: 40°42′53″N 74°00′52″W
- Construction started: 2005
- Completed: 2009
- Opening: 2010
- Cost: $2.1 billion
- Owner: Goldman Sachs

Height
- Roof: 749 ft (228 m)

Technical details
- Floor count: 44
- Floor area: 2,099,985 ft^{2} (195,095.0 m^{2})
- Lifts/elevators: 53

Design and construction
- Architects: Henry N. Cobb of Pei Cobb Freed & Partners, with Adamson Associates Architects
- Developer: Goldman Sachs
- Structural engineer: Halcrow Yolles
- Main contractor: Tishman Construction Corporation

200 West Street is the global headquarters of the Goldman Sachs investment banking firm in the Battery Park City neighborhood of Manhattan in New York City, New York, US. The building is a 749-foot-tall (228 m), 44-story building located on West Street, between Vesey and Murray Streets in Lower Manhattan. It is adjacent to Brookfield Place and the Conrad Hotel, the Verizon Building, and the World Trade Center. It is the only office building in Battery Park City north of Brookfield Place, and it is also the tallest building located within Battery Park City.

The skyscraper was designed by Henry N. Cobb of Pei Cobb Freed & Partners, with Adamson Associates Architects. Construction commenced in 2005 after New York City and state government officials gave Goldman Sachs large subsidies to fund the project. There were several incidents during construction, including a falling load that paralyzed an architect as well as a falling pane of glass. Workers started moving into 200 West Street in late 2009 and the project was completed the next year at a cost of $2.1 billion. The building received a Leadership in Energy and Environmental Design (LEED) gold certification.

== Site ==
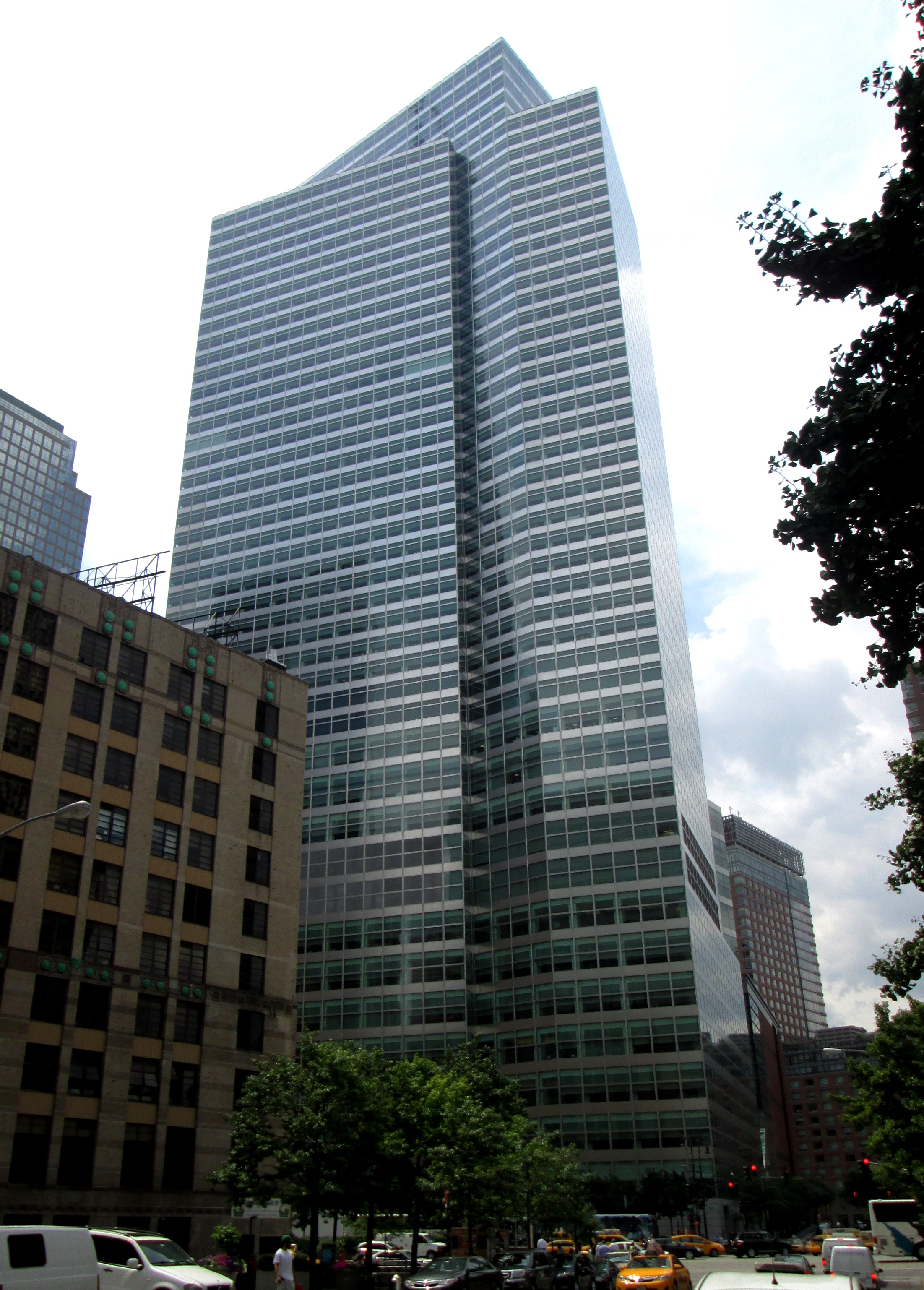
View from Murray Street

200 West Street is in the Battery Park City neighborhood of Manhattan in New York City, New York, US. The building is on the western side of West Street between Murray Street to the north and Vesey Street to the south. It is adjacent to the Conrad Hotel to the west. 200 West Street is directly across from 200 Vesey Street and 250 Vesey Street, both within Brookfield Place (formerly the World Financial Center), to the south. Other nearby buildings include One World Trade Center to the southeast, the Verizon Building to the east, and 111 Murray Street to the northeast. 200 West Street is Battery Park City's only office building north of Brookfield Place.

== Architecture ==
200 West Street was designed by Henry N. Cobb of Pei Cobb Freed & Partners, with Adamson Associates Architects, for investment bank Goldman Sachs. Numerous other firms were hired to design various aspects of the building. According to Goldman Sachs' real estate executive Timur Galen, a variety of new and experienced companies was chosen to highlight each company's different skill sets. The main contractor was the Tishman Construction Corporation. According to The New York Times, 200 West Street is 43 stories and 739 feet (225 m) high, while according to Emporis, it is 44 stories and 749 feet (228 m) high. The building contains about 2,100,000 square feet (200,000 m^{2}) of interior space. (Note: According to Pei Cobb Freed & Partners, there is about 2,175,000 square feet (202,100 m^{2}) of gross floor area. The New York City Department of City Planning gives a gross floor area of 2,157,862 square feet (200,471.9 m^{2}).)

=== Form and facade ===
200 West Street contains a bulky base and a slab-like tower. The southern end of the building is within a zoning lot that prevents that portion of the structure from rising above 140 feet (43 m). The building contains three setbacks on higher floors.

The facade is made of glass and stainless steel. The western facade, facing the Hudson River, contains a curve. The curved western facade was a result of zoning restrictions, which mandated that a sightline of the Hudson River from the World Financial Center had to be preserved. Cobb convinced Goldman Sachs officials that a curve would allow the office space to be arranged more efficiently, in contrast with a diagonal slice. In addition, the facade contains incisions that parallel the angles of Murray Street to the north and Vesey Street to the south.

=== Features ===
The interior superstructure was designed by Guy Nordenson and Associates. At the base of the building, the columns are arranged in a 40-by-60-foot (12 by 18 m) grid. To create an open space for all of the trading floors, the building was developed with large trusses and fewer columns. In the upper stories, the columns around the perimeter are spaced 20 feet (6.1 m) apart at their centers. The southern facade has diagonal beams that extend several stories high, creating an outrigger frame.

==== Base ====
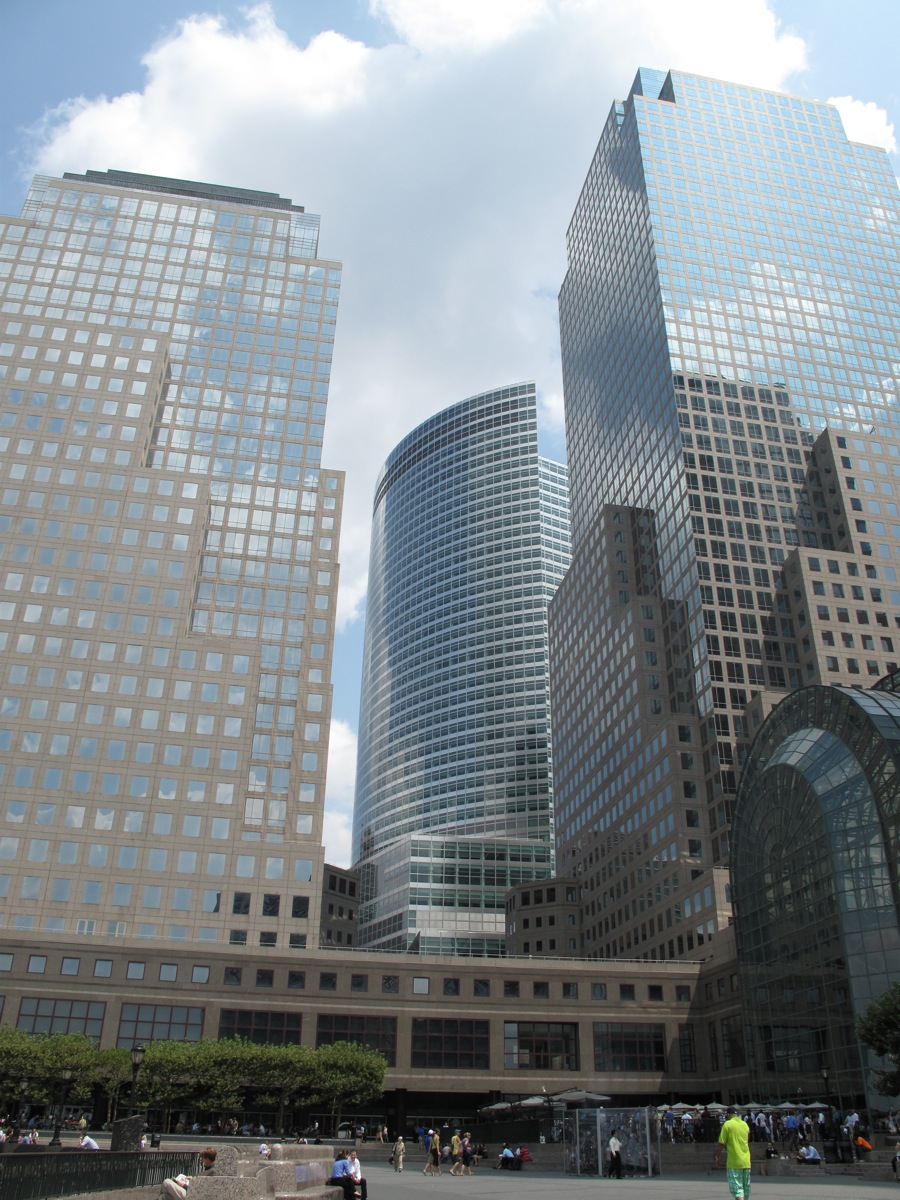
Left to right: 4 World Financial Center, 200 West Street, 3 WFC

Between the building and the Conrad New York hotel to its west is a covered pedestrian walkway. The covered walkway is nicknamed "Goldman Alley", though it is officially named the North End Way. The alley measures 30 feet (9.1 m) wide and contains numerous stores and restaurants. The walkway already existed before the building's construction, but as part of the building's construction, it received a slanted 11,000-square-foot (1,000 m^{2}) glass and metal canopy designed by Preston Scott Cohen. In 2012, Michael Kimmelman of The New York Times characterized the space as "one of the best new works of architecture in New York".

The elevators are clustered in the north portion of the building. The elevator bank is connected to the main entrance, at West and Vesey Street, by a walkway measuring approximately 400 feet (120 m) long. On one wall of the walkway, artist Julie Mehretu created a $5 million, 80-by-23-foot (24 by 7 m) work in 2009, titled Mural and consisting of intersecting dynamic abstract forms in multiple colors. The other wall contains windows that measure 20 feet (6.1 m) high. There are six large trading floors for Goldman Sachs at the building's base. Each trading floor could fit a thousand employees.

==== Upper stories ====
On the 10th through 12th stories, there is an employee amenity space with cafes, a fitness center, and conference space. The amenity space is connected by a three-story staircase and contains an 11th-floor sky lobby. The GS Exchange, a 54,000-square-foot (5,000 m^{2}) gym, contains men's and women's steam rooms. The fitness space was designed by Architecture Research Office. The employee cafeteria was designed by Office dA and contains an undulating ceiling with curved lines. Also included in the building is a 350-seat auditorium, which was designed by SHoP Architects and has an exterior clad in bronze panels.

Above the base are 29 office stories for Goldman Sachs and three executive stories at the top. When the building opened, window-facing offices were largely reserved for Goldman Sachs' "elite partners", while the managing directors directly under their management had interior offices without windows. The private offices are divided by glass partitions, and the wooden desks were designed by Skidmore, Owings & Merrill. The office floors are covered with carpeting. The top floors were designed by KPMB Architects in a manner similar to an executive office. The top offices contain conference and dining rooms as well as an outdoor terrace.

==== Environmental features ====
200 West Street was designed with several environmentally friendly features, such as plumbing with low-flow fixtures, carpets with low chemical levels, and a green roof. The low-flow plumbing fixtures, as well as a system to collect storm runoff, can save 11 million U.S. gallons (42,000,000 L; 9,200,000 imp gal) of water annually. All of the building's carpet padding and wood are recycled as are 90 percent of the concrete and 85 percent of carpet material. The building is also equipped with an "ice farm" with five chillers and 92 storage tanks, which store ice at night, when energy costs are lower than in the daytime. The building also features an environmentally friendly raised floor air system.

The building's environmental features allow 200 West Street to reduce its annual energy consumption by 6.5 million kilowatts (8,700,000 hp) and reduce its carbon dioxide emissions by 2,900 metric tons (2,900 long tons; 3,200 short tons) a year. By including these features, the building received a Leadership in Energy and Environmental Design (LEED) gold certification.

== History ==
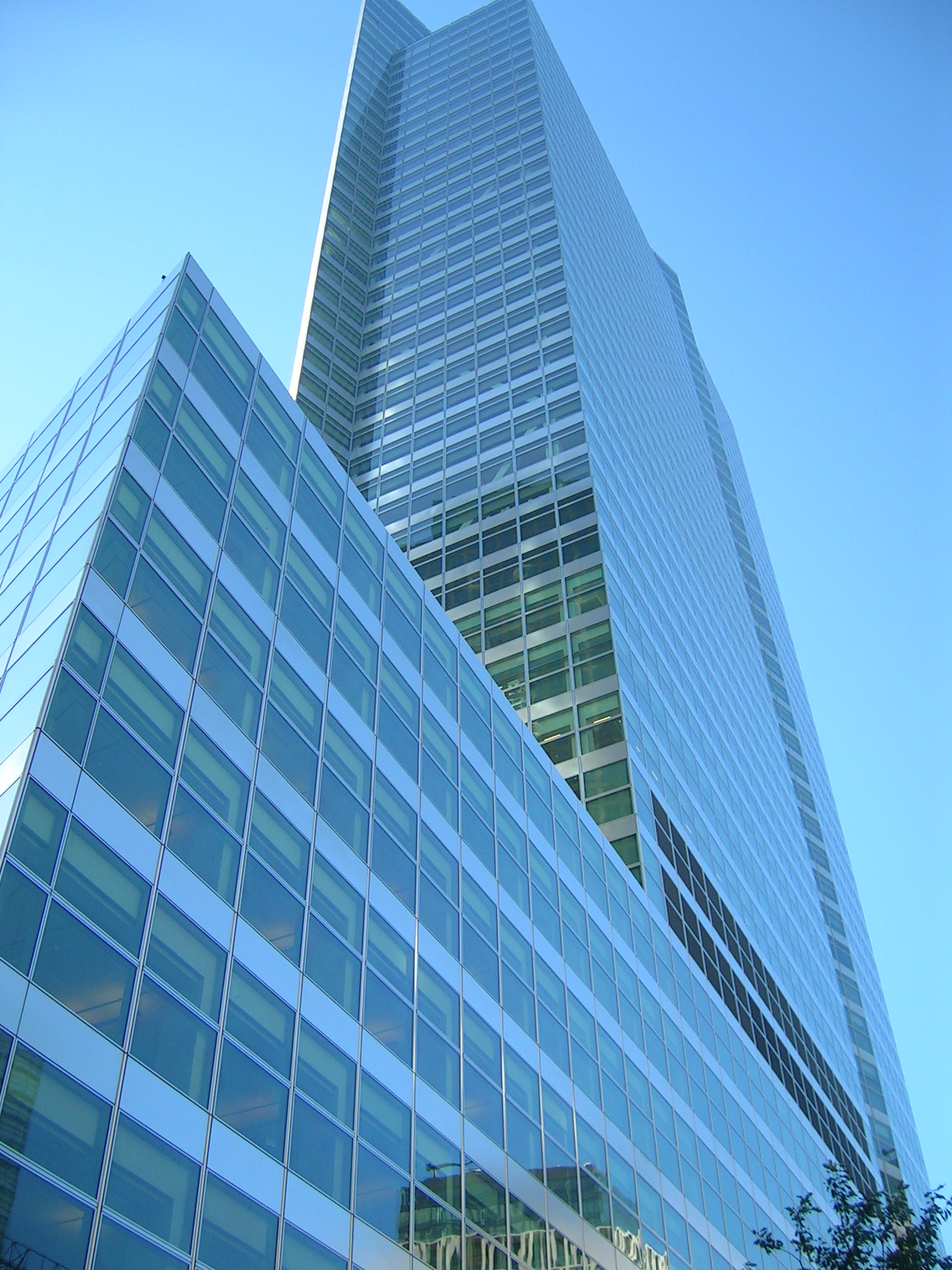
View from West Street

Prior to the completion of 200 West Street, the New York City headquarters of banking firm Goldman Sachs were previously at 85 Broad Street, while the firm's main trading floor was at One New York Plaza. The company also had space at 32 Old Slip. After the World Trade Center was destroyed during the September 11 attacks in 2001, numerous large companies in Lower Manhattan left the area or threatened to leave.

=== Planning ===
During the early 2000s, Goldman Sachs started planning a new headquarters before the leases at its existing buildings expired in the late 2000s. The bank originally planned to relocate traders to the under-construction 30 Hudson Street in Jersey City, New Jersey, just across the Hudson River from Battery Park City. However, these plans were canceled after traders expressed their opposition. In December 2003, The Wall Street Journal announced that Goldman Sachs was considering erecting a headquarters in Battery Park City near the World Trade Center site. The New York Daily News reported that the firm had specifically identified a parking lot on West Street between Murray and Vesey Streets, just northwest of the World Trade Center site. Local business leaders praised the project as a benefit for the neighborhood, which was still being negatively affected by the aftermath of the September 11 attacks.

Goldman Sachs sought subsidies and tax exemptions from the New York state and city governments before committing to the West Street headquarters. By April 2004, Goldman Sachs had hired Pei Cobb Freed & Partners to construct a 40-story tower with a curved facade that met the environmental standards required within Battery Park City. In August 2004, the Battery Park City Authority designated Goldman Sachs as the developer of the West Street site. A dispute arose in late 2004 when New York governor George Pataki proposed rebuilding the nearby section of West Street as a tunnel underneath the World Financial Center. Goldman Sachs objected that the northern portal would be directly in front of the entrance to its headquarters. As a result of the dispute, Goldman Sachs abandoned plans for its West Street headquarters in April 2005. The state government quickly canceled plans for the West Street tunnel, but Goldman Sachs continued to look for additional sites.

In August 2005, Goldman Sachs agreed to develop the West Street site. City and state officials offered additional subsidies to cover the projected $2 billion cost, prompting objections to the size of the subsidies, As a concession, the city agreed to narrow West Street's bike lane and sidewalk so anti-vehicle bollards could be installed. Goldman Sachs CEO Henry Paulson also received a money-back guarantee from the city and state governments, which would impose penalties on the governments if they could not create a plan to secure the area around the World Trade Center. Later that month, a state board approved $115 million in tax breaks and cash grants, as well as $1.65 billion in Liberty Bonds to help cover the building's construction cost. The Battery Park City Authority also agreed to lease the site to Goldman Sachs the same month. The bond financing was enacted that September. Political leaders subsequently said they would not offer such incentives to other projects in Lower Manhattan.

=== Construction ===
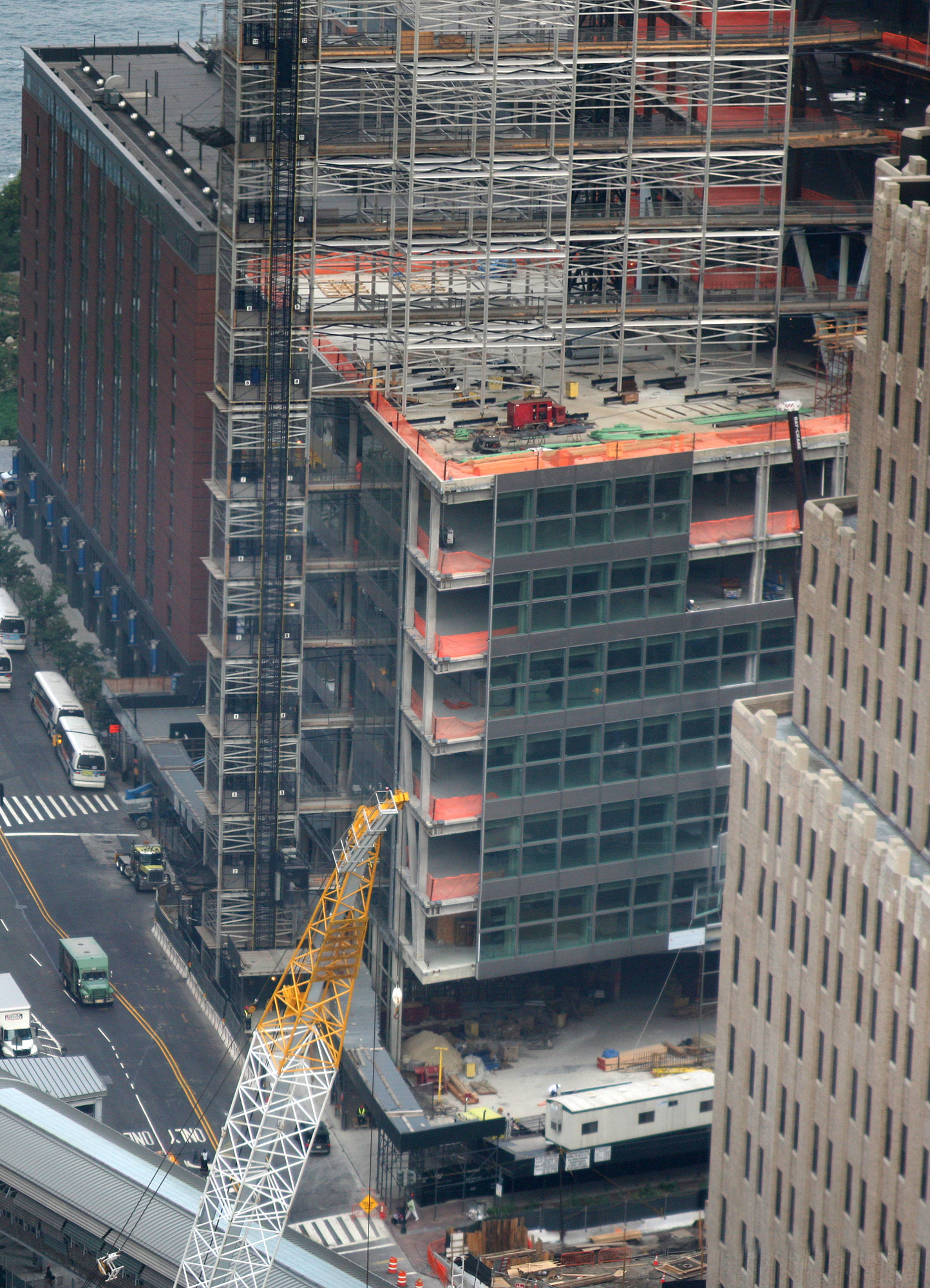
Under construction in 2007

A groundbreaking ceremony for the Goldman Sachs headquarters at 200 West Street occurred on November 29, 2005. In developing the building, Goldman Sachs pledged $3.5 million toward the construction of a New York Public Library branch at North End Avenue and Murray Street, a block west of the new headquarters. Goldman Sachs acquired the adjacent Embassy Suites hotel to the west in 2006, which gave the company more control over the surrounding site. Shortly after construction commenced, Manhattan Community Board 1 passed a resolution mandating that Goldman Sachs devise a plan to reduce the impact of for-hire "black cars" idling around the new headquarters. The project involved hundreds of workers, many from other states. Throughout the construction of the Goldman Sachs headquarters, the company made few public comments about its new building. As David W. Dunlap wrote for The New York Times in 2008: "Only by accident has the building been in the news at all."

On December 14, 2007, a nylon sling on a crane failed, sending a 7-ton load to the ground. It crushed two trailers and severely crippled the legs of an architect inside. Work at the site was halted for several days to remedy the safety violations. Construction was again halted in March 2008 after city inspectors discovered an unauthorized crane operator on-site. Another construction accident occurred on May 17, 2008, when a 30-by-30-inch (76 cm × 76 cm) piece of steel fell eighteen stories onto a neighboring baseball field where children were playing; no one was injured. The city issued a stop-work order and cited the general contractor, Tishman Construction, for five violations. Interior work restarted two weeks later on the lowest thirteen stories, where windows had been installed. Goldman Sachs requested that Tishman erect safety netting on the entire building, and Goldman Sachs CEO Lloyd Blankfein requested regular reports on the status of 200 West Street's construction. Work was stopped again in April 2009 when a hammer fell 18 stories and broke the window of a taxicab passing by.

Further controversies relating to 200 West Street's construction arose when, in May 2008, the Daily News reported on the 2005 money-back guarantee. The state and city governments would forfeit a combined $321 million if infrastructure improvements to the World Trade Center site were not completed by 2009. The state would waive $160 million of tax payments, which were instead placed in an escrow account, while the city would waive $161 million of lease payments on the site through 2069. The improvements included the reconstruction of West Street around the new World Trade Center, the completion of the World Trade Center Transportation Hub, and a ferry landing on the Hudson River near Vesey Street. According to the Port Authority of New York and New Jersey, which was not a party to the agreement, most of these projects were not slated to be completed on time. After the agreement was reported, city and state leaders started negotiating with Goldman Sachs to reduce the penalty.

=== Opening ===
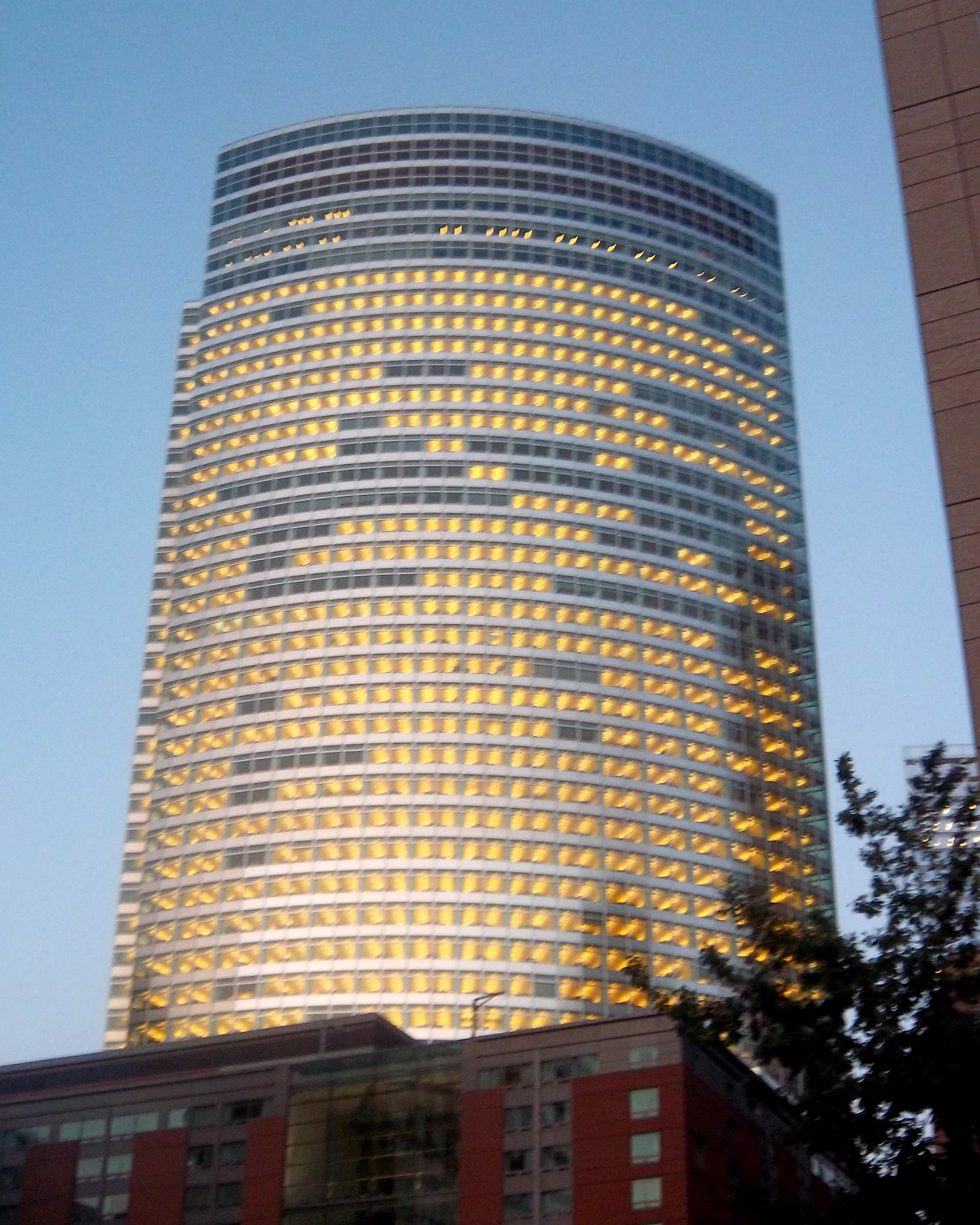
Seen from Hudson River side in 2010

By late 2008, Goldman Sachs intended to sublet its other space in Lower Manhattan once the 200 West Street headquarters was complete. The first of 7,500 employees arrived in November 2009, with the building officially opening on November 16. The building had ultimately cost $2.1 billion to construct, which was $200 million less than Goldman Sachs had originally projected. Shortly after the first workers moved into the building, glass pieces fell from the upper floors, forcing street closures in the neighborhood. That December, Goldman Sachs decided to give the city $161 million in lease payments. However, the firm was scheduled to collect $160 million in the escrow account instead of paying taxes to the state. With the development of its new headquarters, Goldman Sachs also announced plans to convert the adjacent Embassy Suites hotel into a Conrad Hotel.

By April 2010, most of the employees had moved in, with 6,500 workers at the building. In 2010, shortly after the building opened, some employees expressed dissatisfaction at the layout of the offices. Several vice presidents objected that they were working at communal desks, rather than their own office suites, as they had at the 85 Broad Street. The last employees had moved into the building by December 2010.

== Critical reception ==
Upon the building's completion, architecture critic Paul Goldberger wrote for The New Yorker that Goldman Sachs succeeded in keeping "its risk-taking entirely out of sight" with 200 West Street's design, though he deemed it "unfortunate that almost all the daring touches at 200 West Street are inside, hidden from view". Jacqueline Pezzillo of the Center for Architecture described the building as "an indelible legacy of the financial giant [Goldman Sachs] and a tribute to teamwork, creativity, and diversity".
