= Franci Cerar =

Slovenian science fiction writer

- Born: Slovenia
- Occupation: Writer
- Writing career
- Genre: Science fiction
- Notable works: "Umor targumskega diplomata", "Ubogi človek", "Izumi skromnega mladeniča", "Drugo rojstvo"

Franci Cerar is a Slovenian science fiction writer. His works were published in four numbers of Croatian science fiction magazine Sirius. One of his most popular works is short science fiction story Umor targumskega diplomata published in 6. MINI YU SIRIUS. His other works published in Sirius are Izumi skromnega mladeniča, Drugo rojstvo and Ubogi človek. All his works published in Sirius were translated from Slovenian to Croatian language by Krunoslav Poljak.
