= Julie Mehretu =

American contemporary visual artist (born 1970)

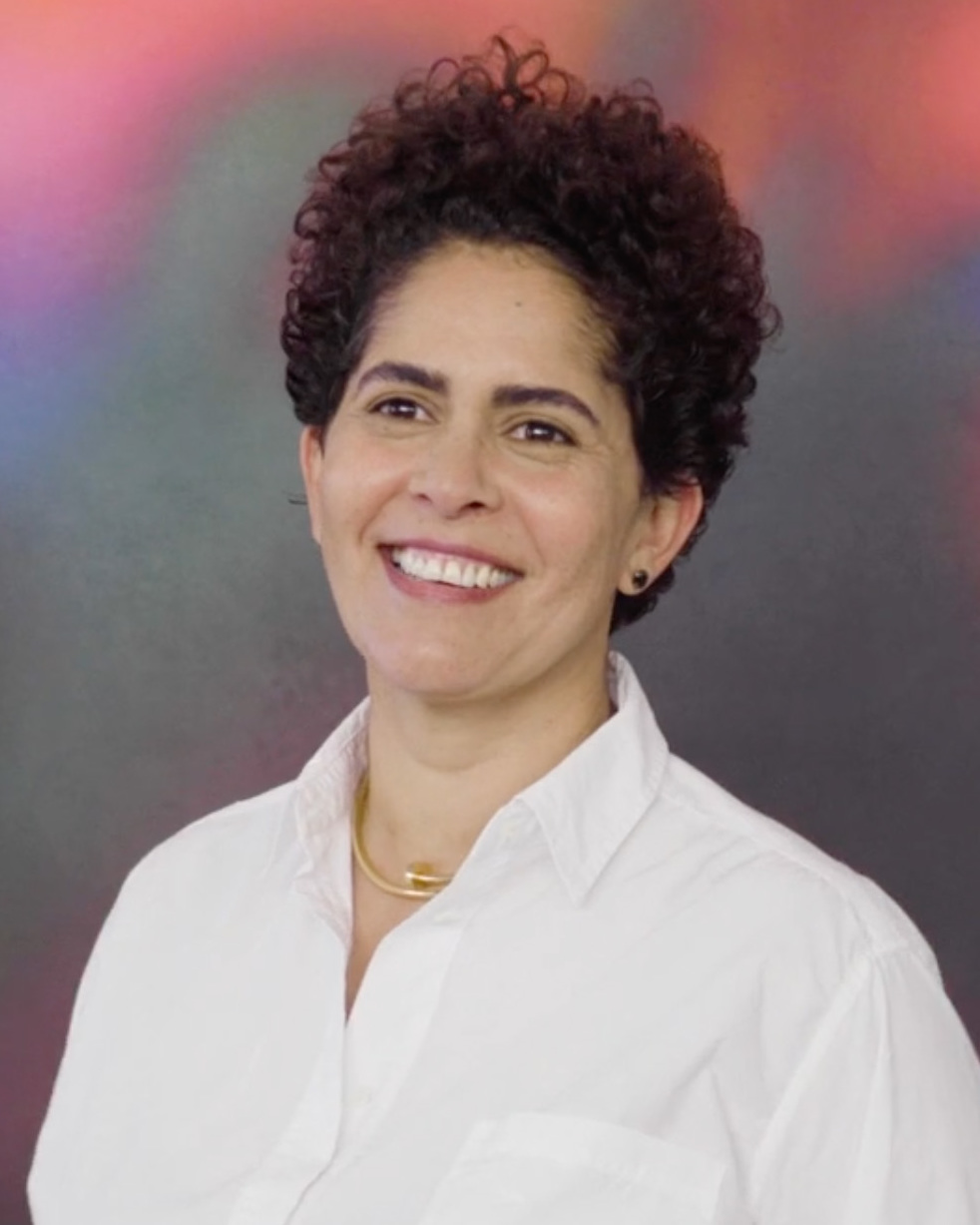
- Mehretu in 2020
- Born: November 28, 1970 (age 55); Addis Ababa, Ethiopian Empire
- Education: East Lansing High School
- Alma mater: Kalamazoo College, Rhode Island School of Design
- Occupation: Painter
- Awards: MacArthur Fellow

Julie Mehretu (born November 28, 1970) is an Ethiopian American contemporary visual artist, known for her multi-layered paintings of abstracted landscapes on a large scale. Her paintings, drawings, and prints depict the cumulative effects of urban sociopolitical changes.

== Early life and education ==
Mehretu was born in Addis Ababa, Ethiopia, in 1970, the first child of an Ethiopian college professor of geography and a Jewish American Montessori teacher. They fled the country in 1977 to escape political turmoil and moved to East Lansing, Michigan, for her father's teaching position in economic geography at Michigan State University.

A graduate of East Lansing High School, Mehretu received a Bachelor of Arts degree from Kalamazoo College in Kalamazoo, Michigan, and did a junior year abroad at Cheikh Anta Diop University (UCAD) in Dakar, Senegal, then attended the Rhode Island School of Design in Providence, Rhode Island, where she earned a Master of Fine Arts degree in 1997. She was chosen for the CORE program at the Museum of Fine Arts in Houston, a residency that provided a studio, a stipend, and an exhibition at the museum.

== Art career ==
Invisible Sun (algorithm 5, second letter form) (2014) at the Museum of Modern Art in 2022

Mehretu's canvases incorporate elements from technical drawings of various urban buildings and linear illustrations of urban efficiency, including city grids and weather charts. The pieces do not contain any formal, consistent sense of depth, instead utilizing multiple points of view and perspective ratios to construct flattened re-imaginings of city life. Her drawings are similar to her paintings, with many layers forming complex, abstracted images of social interaction on a global scale. The relatively smaller-scale drawings are opportunities for exploration made during the time between paintings.

In 2002, Mehretu said of her work:

I think of my abstract mark-making as a type of sign lexicon, signifier, or language for characters that hold identity and have social agency. The characters in my maps plotted, journeyed, evolved, and built civilizations. I charted, analysed, and mapped their experience and development: their cities, their suburbs, their conflicts, and their wars. The paintings occurred in an intangible no-place: a blank terrain, an abstracted map space. As I continued to work I needed a context for the marks, the characters. By combining many types of architectural plans and drawings I tried to create a metaphoric, tectonic view of structural history. I wanted to bring my drawing into time and place.

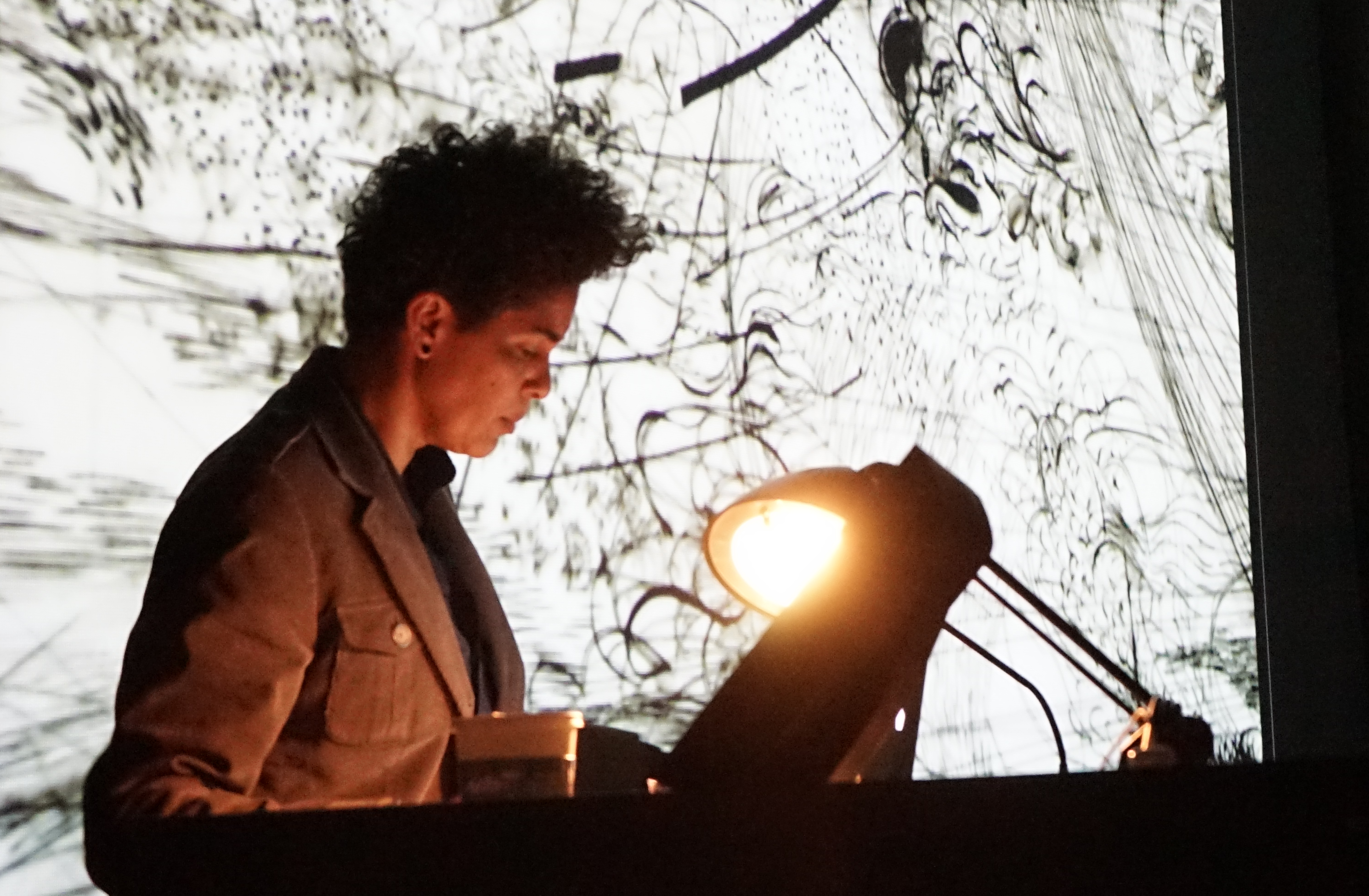
Mehretu speaking in 2014

Emperial Construction, Istanbul (2004) exemplifies Mehretu's use of layers in a city's history. Arabic lettering and forms that reference Arabic script scatter around the canvas. In Stadia I, II, and III (2004) Mehretu conveys the cultural importance of the stadium through marks and layers of flat shape. Each Stadia contains an architectural outline of a stadium, abstracted flags of the world, and references to corporate logos. Mogamma: A Painting in Four Parts (2012), the collective name for four monumental canvases that were included in dOCUMENTA (13), relates to 'Al-Mogamma', the name of the all purpose government building in Tahrir Square, Cairo, which was both instrumental in the 2011 revolution and architecturally symptomatic of Egypt's post-colonial past. The word 'Mogamma', however, means 'collective' in Arabic and historically, has been used to refer to a place that shares a mosque, a synagogue and a church and is a place of multi faith. A later work, The Round City, Hatshepsut (2013) contains architectural traces of Baghdad, Iraq, itself – its title referring to the historical name given to the city in ancient maps. Another painting, Insile (2013) built up from a photo image of Believers' Palace amid civilian buildings, activates its surface with painterly ink gestures, blurring and effacing the ruins beneath.

Conversion (S.M. del Popolo/after C.) (2019–2020) at the Metropolitan Museum of Art in 2022

In 2007, the investment bank Goldman Sachs gave Mehretu a $5 million commission for a lobby mural. The resulting work Mural was the size of a tennis court and consisted of overlaid financial maps, architectural drawings of financial institutions, and references to works by other artists. Calvin Tomkins of the New Yorker called it "the most ambitious painting I've seen in a dozen years", and another commentator described it as "one of the largest and most successful public art works in recent times".

While best known for large-scale abstract paintings, Mehretu has experimented with prints since graduate school at the Rhode Island School of Design, where she was enrolled in the painting and printmaking program in the mid-1990s. Her exploration of printmaking began with etching. She has completed collaborative projects at professional printmaking studios across America, among them Highpoint Editions in Minneapolis, Crown Point Press in San Francisco, Gemini G.E.L. in Los Angeles, and Derrière L'Étoile Studios and Burnet Editions in New York City.

Mehretu was a resident of the CORE Program, Glassell School of Art, Museum of Fine Arts, Houston, (1997–98) and the Artist-in-Residence Program at the Studio Museum in Harlem (2001). During a residency at the Walker Art Center, Minneapolis, in 2003, she worked with thirty high school girls from East Africa. In the spring of 2007 she was the Guna S. Mundheim Visual Arts Fellow at the American Academy in Berlin. Later that year, she led a monthlong residency program with 40 art students from Detroit public high schools.

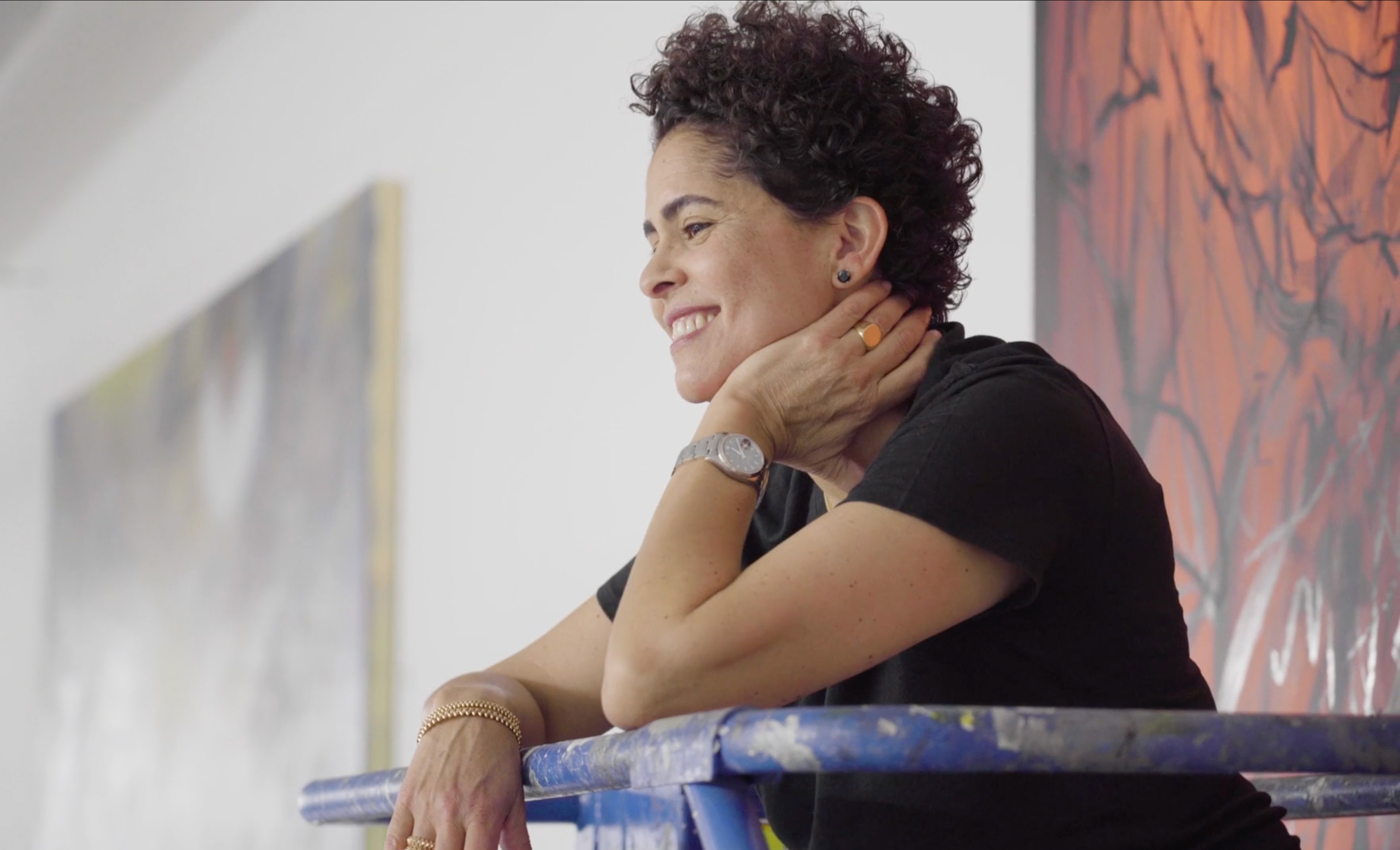
Mehretu in her studio

During her residency in Berlin, Mehretu was commissioned to create seven paintings by the Deutsche Guggenheim; titled Grey Area (2008–2009), the series explores the urban landscape of Berlin as a historical site of generation and destruction. The painting Vanescere (2007), a black-and-white composition that depicts what appears to be a maelstrom of ink and acrylic marks, some of which are sanded away on the surface of the linen support, propelled a layering process of subtraction in the Grey Area series. Parts of Fragment (2008–09) and Middle Grey (2007–09) feature this erasing technique. Another in the series that was painted in Berlin, Berliner Plätze (2008–09), holds a phantom presence of overlapped outlines of nineteenth-century German buildings that float as a translucent mass in the frame. The art historian Sue Scott has this to say of the Grey Area series: "In these somber, simplified tonal paintings, many of which were based on the facades of beautiful nineteenth-century buildings destroyed in World War II, one gets the sense of buildings in the process of disappearing, much like the history of the city she was depicting." As Mehretu explains in Ocula Magazine, "The whole idea of 20th-century progress and ideas of futurity and modernity have been shattered, in a way. All of this is what is informing how I am trying to think about space."

In 2017, Mehretu collaborated with jazz musician and interdisciplinary artist Jason Moran to create MASS (HOWL, eon)]. Presented at Harlem Parish as part of the Performa 17 biennial, MASS (HOWL, eon) took the audience on an intensive tour of Mehretu's canvas while musicians played the composition by Moran.

Mehrhtu's first work in painted glass was installed in 2024. The 85 foot (26 m) tall artwork, Uprising of the Sun, is inspired by a quote from Barack Obama delivered in a speech at a memorial ceremony for the civil-rights-era Selma marches. It was installed as a window in the museum tower of the Barack Obama Presidential Center.

Mehretu is a member of the Artists Committee of Americans for the Arts.

Mehretu has created the 20th BMW art car (BMW M Hybrid V8) in 2024. The car bore the number 20 for the 24h of Le Mans in 2024 and crashed early in the race. It was repaired overnight and finished.

== Recognition ==
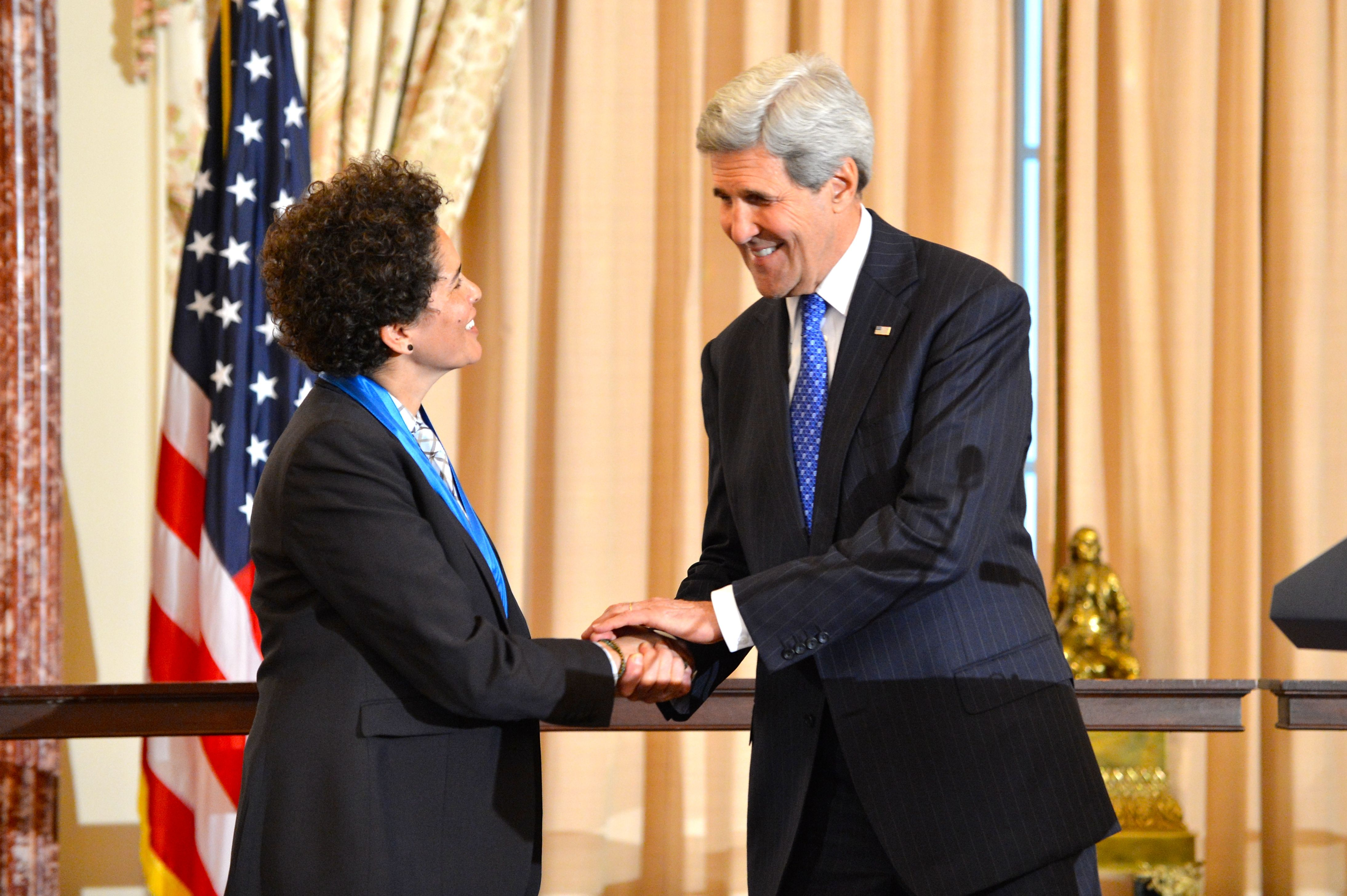
Mehretu received the U.S. Department of State Medal of Arts in 2015

In 2000, Mehretu was awarded a grant from the Foundation for Contemporary Arts Grants to Artists Award. She was the recipient of the 2001 Penny McCall Award and one of the 2005 recipients of the MacArthur Fellowship, often referred to as the "genius grant."

In 2013, Mehretu was awarded the Barnett and Annalee Newman Award, and in 2015, she received the US Department of State Medal of Arts from Secretary of State John Kerry. In 2020, Time magazine included Mehretu in its list of the 100 most influential people. In 2023, German automaker BMW selected Mehretu to paint its annual "art car" for entry at the 24 Hours of Le Mans race.

Art critic for The Australian newspaper Christopher Allen described Mehretu's work as "the last feeble gasp of an overhyped and exhausted New York art market".

Mehretu is included in Time's 100 Most Influential People of 2020. The following year, The New York Times described her as a "rare example of a contemporary Black female painter who has already entered the canon."

In 2023, she was one of two women artists whose work was among the top ten in contemporary auction sale price.

Mehretu currently serves on the Board of Trustees at the Whitney Museum of American Art.

On September 24, 2026, the Baltimore Museum of Art announced that it would award Mehretu its Artist Who Inspires Award "for her influential and ongoing work that expands the language of abstraction on a global stage."

== Notable works in public collections ==
- Blue Field (1997), Museum of Fine Arts, Houston
- Babel Unleashed (2001), Walker Art Center, Minneapolis
- Retopistics: A Renegade Excavation (2001), Crystal Bridges Museum of American Art, Bentonville, Arkansas
- Congress (2003), The Broad, Los Angeles
- Empirical Construction, Istanbul (2003), Museum of Modern Art, New York
- Entropia (review) (2004), Brooklyn Museum, New York
- Stadia I (2004), San Francisco Museum of Modern Art
- Stadia II (2004), Carnegie Museum of Art, Pittsburgh
- Stadia III (2004), Virginia Museum of Fine Arts, Richmond
- Local Calm (2005), The San Diego Museum of Art
- Atlantic Wall (2008-2009), Solomon R. Guggenheim Museum, New York
- Mural (2009), 200 West Street, New York City
- Auguries (2010), The Broad, Los Angeles and National Museum of African Art, Smithsonian Institution, Washington, D.C.
- Untitled (2011), Studio Museum in Harlem, New York
- Mogamma, A Painting in Four Parts: Part 3 (2012), Tate, London
- Mogamma, A Painting in Four Parts: Part 4 (2012), Museum of Fine Arts, Houston
- Cairo (2013), The Broad, Los Angeles
- Invisible Sun (algorithm 5, second letter form) (2014), Museum of Modern Art, New York
- Myriads, Only by Dark (2014), National Gallery of Art, Washington, D.C.; and Pérez Art Museum Miami
- A Love Supreme (2014-2018), Art Institute of Chicago
- Hineni (E. 3:4) (Me voici) (2018), Centre Pompidou, Paris
- Haka (and Riot) (2019), Los Angeles County Museum of Art
- Conversion (S.M. del Popolo/after C.) (2019-2020), Metropolitan Museum of Art, New York

In 2016, the San Francisco Museum of Modern Art commissioned Mehretu to create a diptych, with each massive painting flanking the staircase in the atrium which is accessible and free to the public. HOWL, eon (I, II) (2016-2017) was first exhibited to the public on September 2, 2017. To facilitate the creation of the scale of the diptych, Mehretu used a decommissioned church in Harlem as her studio to create. Throughout the creation of her piece, she collaborated with jazz pianist Jason Moran. HOWL, eon (I, II) is a political commentary on the history of the western United States' landscape, including the San Francisco Bay Area. The foundation of each work contains digitally abstracted photos from recent race riots, street protests, and nineteenth-century images of the American West.

== Exhibitions ==
In 2001, Mehretu participated in the exhibition Painting at the Edge of the World at the Walker Art Center. She later was one of 38 artists whose work was exhibited in the 2004-5 Carnegie International: A Final Look. She has participated in numerous group exhibitions, including one at the Center for Curatorial Studies, Bard College, Annandale-on-Hudson (2000). Her work has appeared in Freestyle exhibition at the Studio Museum in Harlem (2001); The Americans at the Barbican Gallery in London (2001); White Cube gallery in London (2002), the Busan Biennale in Korea (2002); the 8th Baltic Triennial in Vilnius, Lithuania (2002); and Drawing Now: Eight Propositions (2002) at the Museum of Modern Art in New York. Mehretu's work was also included in the "In Praise of Doubt" exhibition at the Palazzo Grassi in Venice in the summer of 2011 as well as dOCUMENTA (13) in Kassel in 2012. In 2014, she participated in The Divine Comedy: Heaven, Purgatory and Hell Revisited by Contemporary African Artists, curated by Simon Njami.

In 2021, the Whitney Museum of American Art devoted an entire floor to a retrospective of Mehretu's career. Mehretu's work is included in Every Sound Is a Shape of Time, a 2024 collections-based exhibition organized by the Pérez Art Museum Miami and curated by Franklin Sirmans, the museum director. Her work was included in the 2024 exhibition Making Their Mark: Works from the Shah Garg Collection at the Berkeley Art Museum and Pacific Film Archive (BAMPFA).

The first exhibition dedicated to Mehretu in Australia and the Asia-Pacific region, titled A Transcore of the Radical Imaginatory, was held by the Museum of Contemporary Art Australia, Sydney, from November 2024 to April 2025.

== Art market ==
Mehretu's painting Untitled 1 (2001) sold for $1.02 million at Sotheby's in September 2010. Its estimated value had been $600–$800,000. At Art Basel in 2014, White Cube sold Mehretu's Mumbo Jumbo (2008) for $5 million. In 2023, Michael Ovitz sold Mehretu's Walkers With the Dawn and Morning (2008) for $10.7 million, setting a new record both for the artist herself and any artist born in Africa.

In 2005, Mehretu's work was the object of the Lehmann v. The Project Worldwide case before the New York Supreme Court, the first case brought by a collector regarding their right to secure primary access to contemporary art. The case involved legal issues over her work and the right of first refusal contracts between her then-gallery and a collector. In return for a $75,000 loan by the collector Jean-Pierre Lehmann to the Project Gallery, made in February 2001, the gallery was to give Lehmann a right of first refusal on any work by any artist the gallery represented, and at a 30 per cent discount until the loan was repaid. Lehmann saw this loan as direct access to Mehretu's work, however, there were four other individuals who were also given right of first choice from the gallery's represented artists. The gallery sold 40 works by Mehretu during the period of the contract, with some offered for discounts of up to 40 percent. Lehmann saw that several Mehretu pieces available in the catalog of the Walker Art Center had been sold to collector Jeanne Greenberg Rohatyn, and suspected that the agreement was not being kept. He subsequently wrote Haye demanding $17,500, and, after no offer of Mehretu pieces was made, he filed suit. The case, eventually won by Lehmann, revealed to a wider public precisely what prices and discounts galleries offer various collectors on paintings by Mehretu and other contemporary artists – information normally concealed by the art world.

In October 2023, Mehretu broke the auction record for an African artist at Sotheby's Hong Kong, with her piece Untitled (2001), which sold for $9.32 million.

== Personal life ==
Mehretu lives in a two-story house in Harlem. She married artist Jessica Rankin in 2008, with whom she has two children, Cade Elias (born 2005) and Haile (born 2011); her mother-in-law is author and poet Lily Brett. The couple separated in 2014.

Mehretu maintains a studio in Chelsea near the Whitney Museum of American Art. In 2004, she co-founded – together with Lawrence Chua and Paul Pfeiffer – Denniston Hill, an artist residency on a 200-acre campus in Sullivan County, New York. She also worked from an old arms factory in Berlin in 2007 and the former St. Thomas the Apostle Church in Harlem from 2016 to 2017.

In October 2024, The Whitney Museum announced that Mehretu had donated more than two million dollars to its "Free 25 and Under" program that provides free access to museum guests under the age of twenty-five.
