= Gary Bukovnik =

American painter

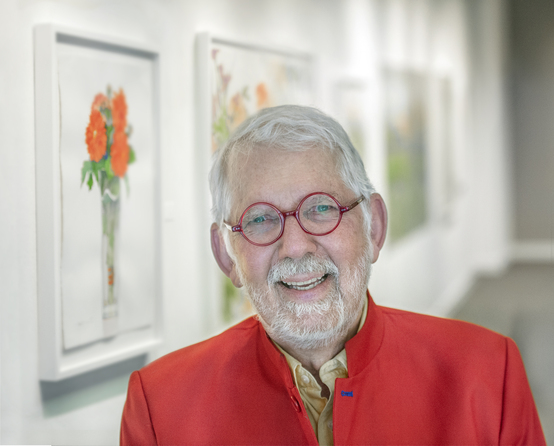
Gary Bukovnik

Gary Bukovnik (born 1947) is an American watercolorist, printmaker, and painter known for large-scale depictions of flowers and botanical subjects. Based in San Francisco, California, Bukovnik has exhibited internationally and is recognized for his expressive use of color, monumental compositions, and contributions to contemporary botanical art. His work is represented in numerous museum collections, including the Metropolitan Museum of Art, the Museum of Modern Art, the Brooklyn Museum, the Art Institute of Chicago, the Library of Congress, and the Fine Arts Museums of San Francisco.

== Early life and education ==
Bukovnik was born in Cleveland, Ohio, in 1947. He studied art in Ohio before relocating to California in the early 1970s. He settled in San Francisco, where he established his career and has maintained his studio practice for several decades.

== Career ==
Working primarily in watercolor, monotype, and lithography, Bukovnik developed a distinctive body of work centered on flowers, still life subjects, and botanical imagery.

Throughout his career, Bukovnik has exhibited extensively throughout the United States, Europe, and Asia. Solo exhibitions have been presented at institutions and venues including the Hunt Institute for Botanical Documentation at Carnegie Mellon University, the Southern Alleghenies Museum of Art, the Brevard Museum of Art, Galerie Kutter in Luxembourg, Takashimaya in Tokyo, the Chin Show Cultural Center in Taipei, and the Today Art Museum in Beijing.

His international exhibition history includes presentations in China, Japan, Taiwan, Spain, Canada, Luxembourg, the Netherlands, and Slovenia. During the 2010s he participated in a series of museum and gallery exhibitions in Beijing, Shanghai, Suzhou, Tianjin, Quanzhou, and Xiamen.

In 2003 and 2005, Bukovnik was invited to serve as a Visiting Artist at the American Academy in Rome. In 2010, he was an artist-in-residence at the Michigan Institute of Arts in Kalamazoo, Michigan.

In addition to his exhibition career, Bukovnik has completed commissions and special projects for cultural institutions. Since 1982, he has created annual posters for the San Francisco Symphony. In 2001, he was selected to contribute to Lincoln Center's List Collection, a poster series that has included works by prominent twentieth-century artists.

== Public collections ==
Works by Bukovnik are held in numerous public collections, including:

- The Metropolitan Museum of Art, New York
- The Museum of Modern Art, New York
- The Brooklyn Museum, New York
- The Art Institute of Chicago
- The Museum of Fine Arts, Boston
- The Philadelphia Museum of Art
- The Library of Congress, Washington, D.C.
- The Smithsonian Institution, Washington, D.C.
- The Fine Arts Museums of San Francisco
- The San Francisco Museum of Modern Art
- The Oakland Museum of California
- The Phoenix Art Museum
- The Portland Art Museum
