= Zachary Fabri =

Artist from Brooklyn, NY

Zachary Fabri (born 1977 in Miami, FL) is a multidisciplinary artist based in Brooklyn, NY.

== Early life and education ==
Fabri received his BFA in graphic design from University of Florida in 2000, studied photography at Universität der Künste, Berlin and received his Master of Fine Arts from Hunter College in 2007 in Combined Media.

== Career ==
Most of his work spans performance and video and works through conceptual themes of context, politics, and Black masculinity.

In 2007 Fabri had a solo exhibition at Aljira Center for Contemporary Art in Newark, NJ. He has collaborated with Bessie Award winning choreographer Joanna Kotze on “Find Yourself Here,” at the Baryshnikov Arts Center in 2015, collaborated with artist Torkwase Dyson in 2019, performing with her sculptures at Colby College and New Orleans Museum of Art and collaborated with Mickalene Thomas on her Henry Art Gallery exhibition, MUSE for a “tête-à-tête.”

Fabri's video premiered at Art World Conference of 2020 with his performance in their first online edition.

In 2020 Fabri won the Colene Brown Art Prize.
