= Božo Cerar =

Slovenian diplomat (born 1949)

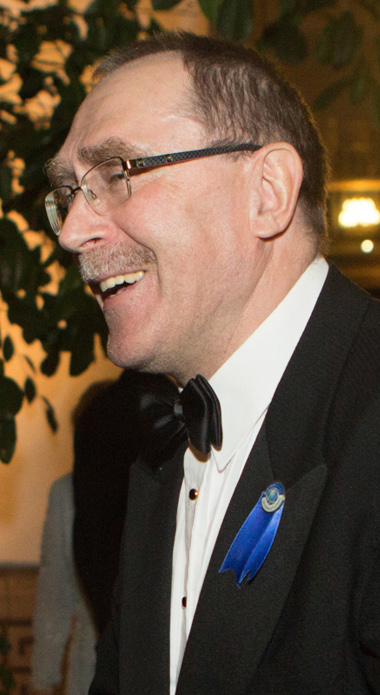
- Cerar in 2017
- Born: October 16, 1949 (age 76); Ljubljana, PR Slovenia, FPR Yugoslavia
- Education: University of Ljubljana, University of Westminster
- Occupation: Diplomat
- Notable work: Diplomacija za kulisami, Opazovalci, Diplomatska zaščita, Washingtonski zapiski, RSVP Kulinarična diplomacija in Veliki slovenski diplomatski pojmovnik

Božo Cerar (born 16 October 1949) is a Slovenian diplomat.

== Education and early life ==
Cerar was born on October 16, 1949, in Ljubljana, PR Slovenia, to Ivan and Joža Cerar (née Grebenc). He attended primary school in Dolsko and Ljubljana-Polje and graduated from Ljubljana-Bežigrad High School in 1968. He continued his education at the Law School of the University of Ljubljana where he received a law degree. After, he earned a master's degree in diplomatic studies at the University of Westminster in London. Additionally, he also obtained a PhD in international law with a focus on diplomatic protection at the Law School of the University of Ljubljana.

== Early career ==
He began his diplomatic career in 1974 in Yugoslavia as an intern at the Federal Secretariat of Foreign Affairs (FSFA). He then worked as Vice-Consul at the Yugoslav Consulate-General in Sydney, Australia from 1977 to 1981 and then served as First Secretary for press and cultural cooperation at the Yugoslav Embassy in Greece from 1985 to 1989. Dr. Cerar among others worked towards equal use and recognition of the Slovenian language in Yugoslav diplomatic service, especially in communication with Slovenian emigrants and Slovenian speaking Yugoslavian citizens. In the period between his first and second posting, he was the Secretary of the Committee for International Cooperation of the Trade Union Association of Slovenia. At the time of the breakup of Yugoslavia, he was the head of the Western Europe Department at FSFA. His last year in Yugoslav, first months in Slovenian diplomatic service, and his contribution to the Slovenian independence is described in his books: Diplomacija za kulisami (Diplomacy Behind the Coulisses) (2000), and Opazovalci (Observers) (2011). An extract from Diplomacija za kulisami was also published in Delo, a Slovenian newspaper.

== Work at the Ministry of Foreign Affairs ==
His work at the Ministry of Foreign Affairs (MFA) of the Republic of Slovenia began the morning after the proclamation of Slovenia's independence. In the Summer of 1991, after the Agreement at Brioni, the government of the Republic of Slovenia appointed him coordinator of the Liaison officers who worked to insure communication between Slovenian authorities and the observers of the European Union. They oversaw the implementation of the ceasefire between the Slovenian Territorial Defence and Yugoslav Armed Forces. In the second half of the year, Dr. Cerar led the Department for European Countries and North America, one of the two departments at the MFA at that time. In the spring of 1992, as a Charge d'Affaires ad interim, he opened the Slovenian embassy in London, where he served until 1996. The same year he also became the Under Secretary at the MFA and Head of the Cabinet of the Minister of Foreign Affairs, first Zoran Thaler, followed by Davorin Kračun and then again Zoran Thaler. From 1997 to 2001 he served as the Ambassador of the Republic of Slovenia to Canada. After his return to MFA he first led the Department for Multilateral Affairs and then the North Atlantic Treaty Organization (NATO) Department. As an eager supporter of Transatlantic relationship and NATO, he was very active before the referendum on Slovenia's joining the Alliance. In 2004, he became the Ambassador of the Republic of Slovenia to Poland. In the first government of Janez Janša in 2005 and 2006, he served as Deputy Foreign Minister. He was the Permanent Representative of the Republic of Slovenia to NATO from 2007 to 2011. After his return, he served as State Secretary in MFA in the second government of Janez Janša, and then as the State Secretary in the government of Alenka Bratušek. His diplomatic journey ended as Ambassador of the Republic of Slovenia to the United States and Mexico from 2013 to 2017.

== Published works ==
In addition to the aforementioned two books, Božo Cerar also published some other books on the topics of international law and international relations – Veliki slovenski diplomatski pojmovnik (The Big Slovenian Diplomatic Glossary)(2024), Slovenski diplomatski pojmovnik (The Slovenian Diplomatic Glossary) (First edition 2020, Second edition 2023), Diplomatski pojmovnik (The Diplomatic Glossary) (2019), Majhne Države v Svetu Tektonskih Sprememb (Small Countries in a World of Tectonic Change) (2026), Diplomatska zaščita (Diplomatic protection) (2001), Faux pas (2013), Washingtonski zapiski (Washington Logs) (2018) and RSVP Kulinarična diplomacija (RSVP Culinary Diplomacy) (2022) as well as a number of articles (COBBIS). He has also published a series of fictional books for children, translated into English and Polish respectively, such as: Veronika in letalo ropotalo (Veronika and the Rattle Plane) (2001), Uganke za Veroniko (Zagadki dla Weroniki) (2005), Gorska ribica gre na morje (Little Mountain-Fish Goes to Sea) (2015), Hrib nad dedkovo hišo (The Hill Beyond Grandpa's House) (2018), and Slinko (2022). Dnevi preizkušenj (The Days of Trials) (2001) represents a youth story. He has also published a partially autobiographic novel under the pseudonym Božidar T. Dolenc, titled Grenke pomaranče (Bitter Oranges) in a series of four books (2000, 2012, 2018, 2023). The novel is a rare example of Slovenian literature on the topic of the life of a diplomat. Zgodbe iz mladosti (Stories from youth) (2019) are also an autobiographical work.
