= List of buildings, sites, and monuments in New York City =

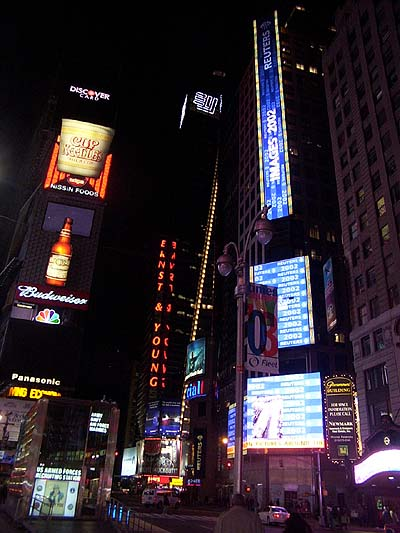
Times Square, in Manhattan

Following is an alphabetical list of notable buildings, sites and monuments located in New York City in the United States. The borough is indicated in parentheses.

- American Museum of Natural History (Manhattan)
  - Rose Center for Earth and Space
- America's Response Monument (Manhattan)
- Apollo Theater (Manhattan)
- Bank of America Tower (Manhattan)
- Battery Park (Manhattan)
  - Castle Clinton
  - East Coast Memorial
  - The Sphere
- Battery Park City Ferry Terminal (Manhattan)
- Brill Building (Manhattan)
- Bronx Zoo (Bronx)
- Brooklyn Botanic Garden (Brooklyn)
- Brooklyn Bridge (connects Brooklyn and Manhattan)
- Brooklyn Museum (Brooklyn)
- Brooklyn Public Library (Brooklyn)
- Bryant Park (Manhattan)
- Burton Arms Apartments (Bronx)
- Carnegie Hall (Manhattan)
- Cathedral of St. John the Divine (Manhattan)
- Central Park (Manhattan)
  - Central Park Zoo
  - Strawberry Fields
- Chelsea Piers (Manhattan)
- Chrysler Building (Manhattan)
- Citi Field (Queens)
- Cleopatra's Needle (Central Park, Manhattan)
- College Point Little League Building (Queens)
- Columbia University (Manhattan)
- Columbus Circle (Manhattan)
- Downtown Athletic Club (Manhattan)
- East River Park (Manhattan)
- East River State Park (Brooklyn)
- Eleanor Roosevelt Monument (Riverside Park, Manhattan)
- Empire State Building (Manhattan)
- Federal Hall National Memorial (Manhattan)
- Firemen's Memorial (Manhattan)
- Flatiron Building (Manhattan)
- Flushing Meadows-Corona Park (Queens)
- Fordham University (Bronx)
- Frick Collection (Manhattan)
- George Gustav Heye Center (Manhattan)
- George Washington Bridge (connects Manhattan and New Jersey)
- Gracie Mansion (Manhattan)
- Grand Army Plaza (Brooklyn)
- Grand Central Terminal (Manhattan)
- General Grant National Memorial (Manhattan)
- Green-Wood Cemetery (Brooklyn)
- Hall of Fame for Great Americans (Bronx)
- Harvard Club of New York City (Midtown Manhattan)
- Historic Richmond Town (Staten Island)
- Holland Tunnel (connects Manhattan and New Jersey)
- Intrepid Sea, Air & Space Museum (Manhattan)
- Irish Hunger Memorial (Manhattan)
- Lincoln Center for the Performing Arts (Manhattan)
  - David Geffen Hall (formerly known as Avery Fisher Hall and prior as Philharmonic Hall)
  - David H. Koch Theater (formerly known as the New York State Theater)
  - Metropolitan Opera
- Lincoln Tunnel (connects Manhattan and New Jersey)
- Lipstick Building (Manhattan)
- Macy's Herald Square (Manhattan)
- Madison Square Garden (Manhattan)
- Manhattan Bridge (connects Manhattan and Brooklyn)
- Manhattan Municipal Building (Manhattan)
- Metropolitan Fireproof Warehouse (Manhattan)
- Metropolitan Museum of Art (Manhattan)
- MetLife Building (formerly known as the Pan Am Building, Manhattan)
- Museum of Modern Art (Manhattan)
- National September 11 Memorial & Museum (Manhattan)
- New York City Hall (Manhattan)
- New York Botanical Garden (Bronx)
- New York Evening Post Building (Manhattan)
- New York Life Building (Manhattan)
- New York Public Library (Manhattan)
- New York Stock Exchange (Manhattan)
- Odd Fellows Hall (Manhattan)
- Paley Center for Media (Manhattan)
- Pelham Bay Park (The Bronx)
- Pennsylvania Station (Manhattan)
- Pier 11/Wall Street (Manhattan)
- Plaza Hotel (Manhattan)
- Prison Ship Martyrs' Monument (Brooklyn)
- Prospect Park (Brooklyn)
  - Prospect Park Zoo
- Queens Museum of Art (Queens)
- Racquet and Tennis Club (Manhattan)
- Rockefeller Center (Manhattan)
- Radio City Music Hall (Manhattan)
- St. Patrick's Cathedral (Manhattan)
- Seagram Building (Manhattan)
- Shea Stadium (Queens; demolished 2009)
- Silvercup Studios (Queens)
- Solomon R. Guggenheim Museum (Manhattan)
- Statue of Liberty (Manhattan)
- Times Square (Manhattan)
- Trinity Church (Manhattan)
- United Nations Headquarters (Manhattan)
- Vietnam Veterans Plaza (Manhattan)
- The Waldorf-Astoria Hotel (Manhattan)
- Washington Square Park (Manhattan)
  - New York University campus
- Whitney Museum of American Art (Manhattan)
- Williamsburg Bridge (connects Manhattan and Brooklyn)
- Woodlawn Cemetery (Bronx)
- Woolworth Building (Manhattan)
- World Trade Center site (Manhattan)
- World Financial Center (Manhattan)
- Yankee Stadium (Bronx)

== Skyscrapers ==
(in height order; unless otherwise noted, all are in Manhattan)

- One World Trade Center – 541.32 metres (1,776.0 feet)
- Empire State Building – 381.0 metres (1,250.0 feet)
- Bank of America Tower – 366.0 metres (1,200.8 feet)
- Chrysler Building – 318.8 metres (1,046 feet)
- American International Building – 290.2 metres (952 feet)
- 40 Wall Street – 282.5 metres (927 feet)
- Citigroup Center – 278.9 metres (915 feet)
- Trump World Tower – 262.4 metres (861 feet)
- Bloomberg Tower – 260.8 metres (856 feet)
- GE Building – 259.1 metres (850 feet)
- CitySpire Center – 248.1 metres (814 feet)
- One Chase Manhattan Plaza – 247.8 metres (813 feet)
- Condé Nast Building – 246.6 metres (809 feet)
- MetLife Building – 246.4 metres (808 feet)
- Woolworth Building – 241 metres (791 feet)
- One Worldwide Plaza – 237 metres (778 feet)
- Carnegie Hall Tower – 231 metres (758 feet)
- 383 Madison Avenue (formerly known as the Bear Stearns Building) – 231 metres (758 feet)

== See also ==
- Geography of New York Harbor
- List of National Historic Landmarks in New York City
- List of neighborhoods in New York City
- List of New York City Designated Landmarks
- National Register of Historic Places listings in New York
- List of New York City parks
- List of nightclubs in New York City
