= 352 and 353 Riverside Drive =

Houses in Manhattan, New York

- Townhouses at 352 and 353 Riverside Dr.
- U.S. National Register of Historic Places
- New York State Register of Historic Places
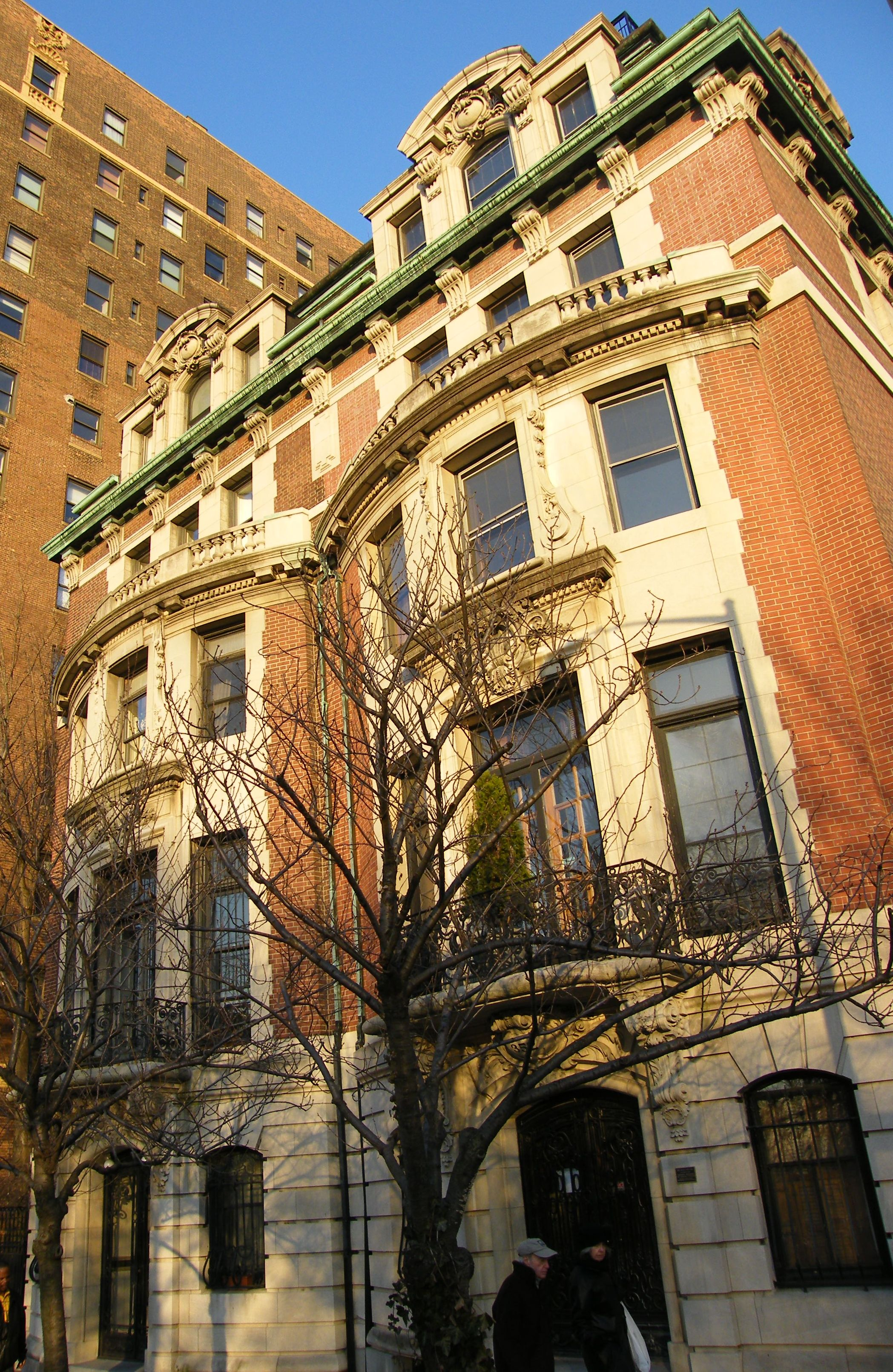
- The houses in 2009

- Location within Manhattan Location within New York City Location within New York Location within the United States
- Location: Manhattan, New York, United States
- Coordinates: 40°48′12″N 73°58′09″W
- Area: less than one acre
- Built: 1899
- Architect: Robert D. Kohn
- Architectural style: Beaux-Arts
- NRHP reference No.: 05000944
- NYSRHP No.: 06101.015205, 06101.012745

Significant dates
- Added to NRHP: September 1, 2005
- Designated NYSRHP: June 22, 2005

352 and 353 Riverside Drive are a pair of houses along Riverside Drive on the Upper West Side of Manhattan, New York City, United States. They were designed in 1899 by Robert D. Kohn in the Beaux-Arts style. The southern house at number 352 was owned by Adolphe Openhym, a silk merchant who developed both houses. The financier William Clark Poillon lived in the northern house, number 353. The houses were part of Woodstock College, a Jesuit seminary, by 1943 and were sold off in 1977. While number 352 remained in use as a private residence, number 353 was converted to a co-op apartment.

The houses have nearly identical designs with outwardly-bowed facades, differing slightly in fine details. The base has a water table and a rusticated first story, and the upper floors combine limestone and red brick. The buildings each have copper cornices and mansard roofs with dormers. Number 352 retains its original interiors, but number 353 has been subdivided over the years. Remaining decorative details in number 352 include leaded glass, wood paneling, pocket doors, moldings, and ceilings with coffers. The houses are listed on the National Register of Historic Places.

== Site ==
352 and 353 Riverside Drive are located on the Upper West Side of Manhattan, New York City, United States. They occupy midblock sites between 107th and 108th streets on the eastern sidewalk of Riverside Drive, across from Riverside Park. Each site is 41 1/12 by 100 feet (12.5 by 30.5 m) across, the shorter dimension facing the street. 352 Riverside Drive is only 26 feet (7.9 m) wide; the remaining 15 feet (4.6 m) of the lot's width is occupied by a side garden, located south of the house. A similar side garden exists north of 353 Riverside Drive. These side gardens are uncommon on Riverside Drive, where buildings are placed directly against each other.

352 and 353 Riverside Drive stood between two mansions built along Riverside Drive and Park. The Schinasi House (designed by William Tuthill) is immediately to the south, while directly to the north is an apartment building that replaced the Bayne Mansion (designed by Frank Freeman). These were among a number of mansions built on the avenue in the late 19th and early 20th centuries, at a time when developers envisioned Riverside Drive as a rival to the millionaires' row on Fifth Avenue. The prediction for this kind of development never reached its full potential. The houses of the Riverside–West 105th Street Historic District are located one block south, and there are apartment buildings and late 19th- or early 20th-century houses on the surrounding blocks.

== Architecture ==
Both houses were designed in 1899 by Robert D. Kohn in the Beaux-Arts style. The houses have nearly identical designs, differing slightly in fine details such as ironwork, cartouches, and brackets. The writer Stephanie Azzarone, comparing the houses with the Schinasi Mansion, described them as "a pair of rubies complementing Schinasi's luxurious string of pearls". Jason Sheftell of the New York Daily News wrote that number 353 was "a regal home in any neighborhood".

=== Facade ===
The houses retain most of their original exterior features. On both buildings, the lowest three stories of the facade's front (western) elevation are slightly bowed outward and are divided vertically into three bays. The water table—the portion of the facade below the first story—is variously described as being made of cast stone or of granite. Both houses' first stories are clad in limestone, which is rusticated. Each house has a central protruding pavilion, with two steps ascending to the entrance from the street. Each entryway has a deeply recessed glass-and-wrought iron double door, housed within segmental arches. The keystones of these houses have cartouches, within which the address numbers are inscribed. Brackets above each archway support balconettes on the second floor of each house. The doors are flanked by segmental-arch windows with iron grilles.

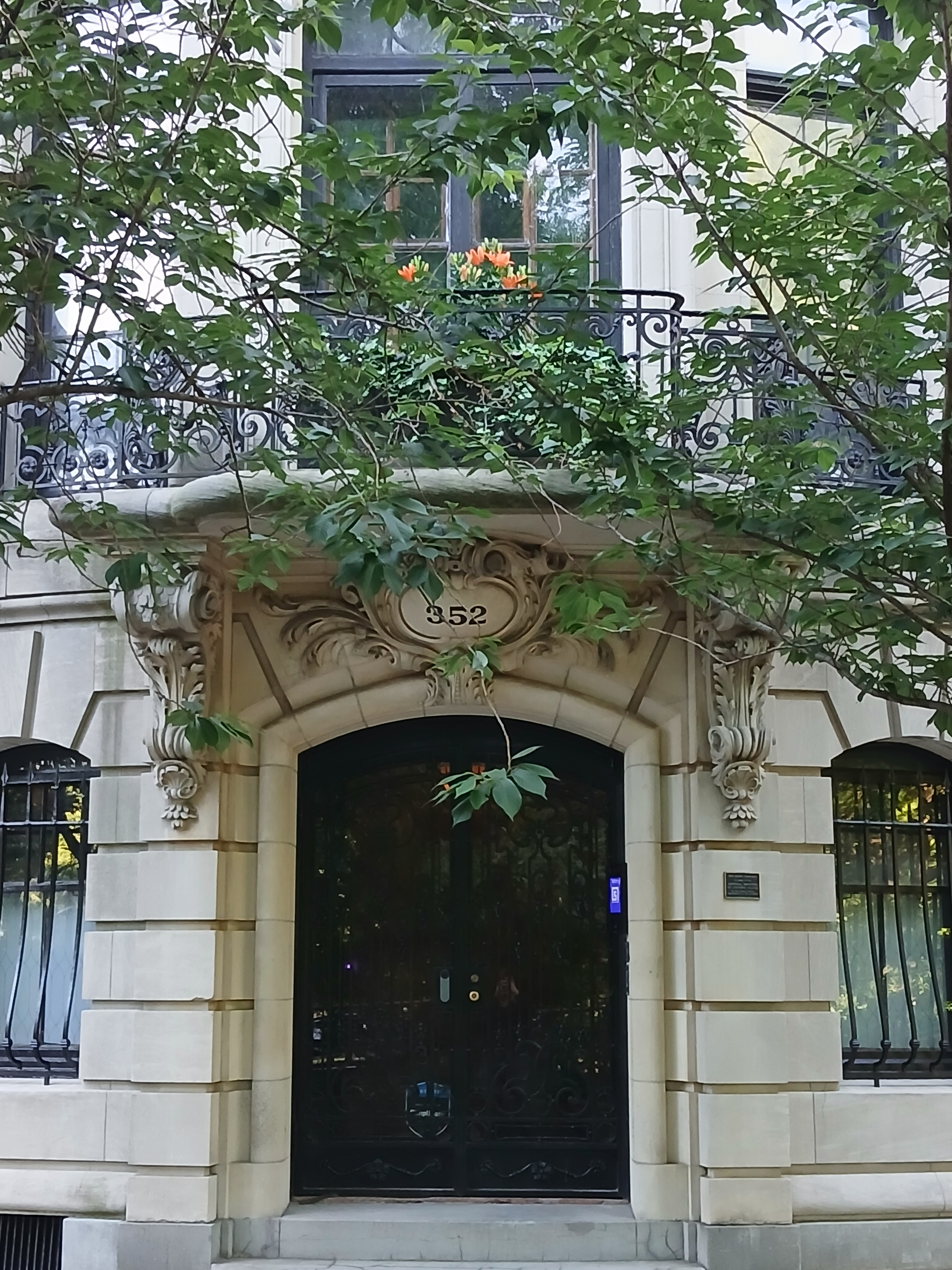
Base of number 352

On the second and third stories, each house's bays are housed in a central limestone frame, with quoined or keyed edges, while the outer sections of the facade are clad in brick. The balconettes have iron railings and are accessed by French doors topped by transom windows. The central windows are topped by decorative lintel beams with dentils, along with cartouche keystones. On the third story of each building, there are volutes and bellflower motifs around the center opening, flanked by one window on either side. A cornice with modillions, and a balustrade, run above the bowed bay, behind which are the fourth-story windows. The fourth story has a limestone frame with keyed or quoined frame, which surrounds the rectangular windows. A limestone lozenge straddles the houses on the same story, and limestone brackets supporting a shared copper cornice are placed above this story. The fifth story of each house is placed within a mansard roof and illuminated from the west by a dormer containing three windows. The segmentally-arched center window in each dormer is topped by a cartouche within a broken pediment, and it is flanked by brackets separating it from rectangular windows on either side.

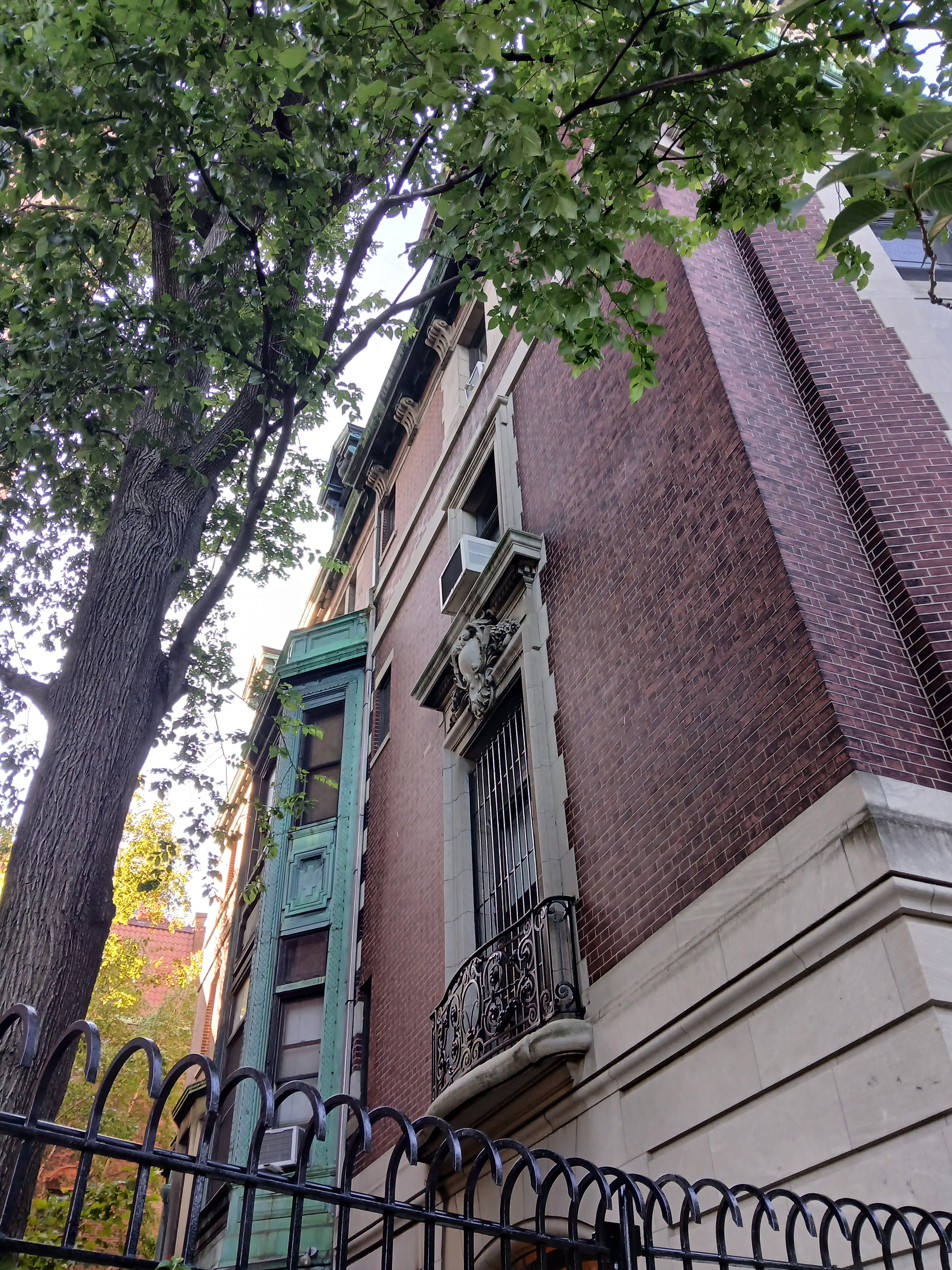
Side elevation of number 353

The decorations of 352–353 Riverside Drive's side (northern and southern) elevations are visible from the street. On the side elevations' westernmost bays, there is a segmental-arched archway within the rusticated base; rectangular second-through-fourth-story windows; a cornice with brackets; and a segmentally arched roof dormer topped by a cartouche and pediment. The remainders of the side elevations are clad in red brick with limestone trim. The center of each of the side elevations has angled copper bay windows spanning the second and third floors, supported by brackets. There are spandrel panels with guilloché moldings in the bay windows themselves, along with parapets above. The rear or easternmost bay has a smaller, shallower bay window on the second floor. Both houses' rear facades have four-story wings, which date from the original construction.

The original windows at number 352 have since been replaced with storm windows. Number 352 also has a glass-walled fifth-story space, added after the original construction. Number 353's windows have also been replaced, albeit with sash windows.

=== Interior ===
Both houses were built with modern utilities and mechanical systems for their time, as well as carved woodwork, plaster, wrought iron, and leaded glass, executed in a mixture of styles. 352 Riverside Drive retains its original interiors. Number 352 has nine bedrooms, in addition to either eight or nine bathrooms (six of which are classified as full bathrooms). Spread across number 352 are eight fireplaces, along with decorative details such as leaded glass, wood paneling, pocket doors, moldings, and ceilings with coffers. In contrast, the interiors of number 353 have been subdivided into apartments over the years. Many of number 353's decorative details (which resemble those at number 352) remain intact, but each floor is generally divided into apartments at the front and rear, and there is a stair down its center.

Both houses have cellars, which originally included wine storage, coal storage, and mechanical spaces; these features remain intact in number 352. Both houses were also equipped with elevator shafts from the outset, but Openhym used the shaft in his house for storage rather than as an elevator.

==== 352 Riverside Drive ====
The entrance leads to a vestibule with marble floors and walls and a plaster ceiling. On the north (left) wall, a door leads into a large, irregularly shaped entrance hall with oak woodwork, paneled pilasters, and a stone fireplace mantel. West of the entrance hall is the stair hall, where a curved main stair with a mahogany wainscot and an ornate wrought-iron railing ascends to the second floor; the stair hall also contains an elevator and a hallway leading to the rear kitchen. To the right of the main stair is a rectangular, oak-paneled billiard room (now a dining room) with a leaded-glass window and a small attached bathroom. At the rear of the house is a kitchen spanning the house's width, connecting to a pantry with cabinets and a dumbwaiter, along with a service stair.

The main stair leads to a central hall on the second floor, which has Ionic columns, a plaster ceiling with deep coffers at the room's south end, and an angled bay with antique painted and leaded glass. The hall separates a sparsely decorated parlor in the front (west) and a more ornate dining room in the rear (east). The parlor has a bowed western wall illuminated by the facade's three windows, along with a white marble fireplace decorated with two putti. The dining room's walls have Gothic-style oak paneling for three-quarters of the room's height, above which are stucco upper walls; the room also has a beamed ceiling and a massive Renaissance-style oak fireplace with a Baroque painting on its overmantel.

From the second story, a narrow stair ascends to a central hall on the third story, which has paneled walls as well as doorways to the three other rooms on that story. There is a master bedroom in the front, which contains a coved ceiling, a wood fireplace with Corinthian pilasters, a walk-in closet, and sliding closet shutters. The center of the third story has a neoclassical dressing room with dark woodwork and decorations such as Doric pilasters, adjacent to a bathroom, while the rear library–study has a fireplace with a Doric-style fireplace frame and walls with bookshelves. Another stair ascends to the fourth floor, where there are three bedrooms, which have details such as decorative mantelpieces and coved ceilings. The central bedroom is a sitting room with French doors opening onto a side terrace. On the fifth floor are five small rooms, likely used for service functions, including a front room with Elizabethan-style wooden fireplace. There is a stained glass skylight over the stair, which is made of Tiffany glass and may be original to the building.

== History ==
=== 1890s to 1930s ===
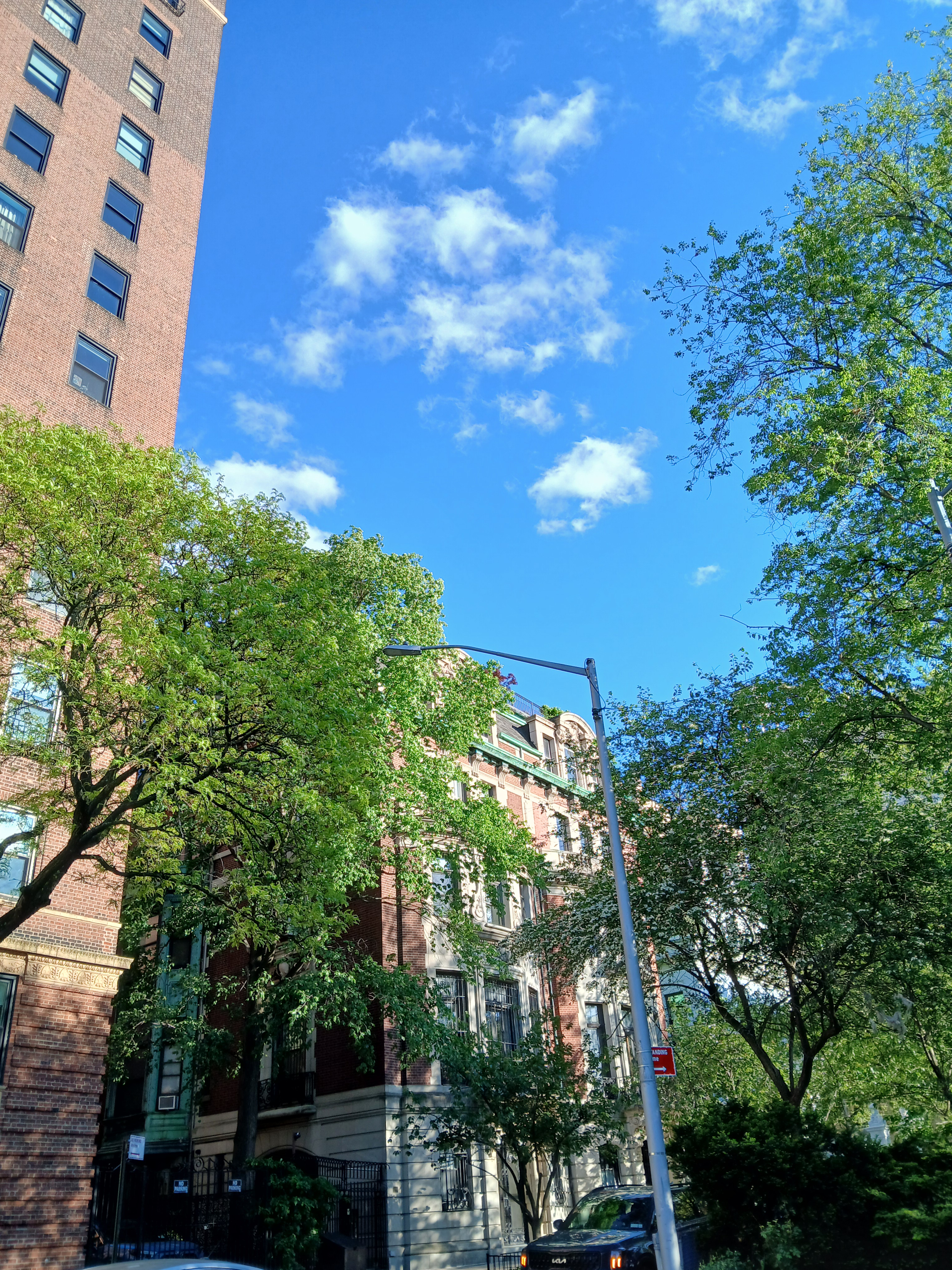
The houses seen from Riverside Drive's main roadway

Both houses were commissioned for the silk merchant Adolphe Openhym (sometimes spelled Openhyme). Prior to the acquisition, the site had been part of a larger land assemblage that the Atlas Improvement Company had obtained in 1889–1890. In April 1899, Openhym bought a 41 1/12-by-100-foot (12.5 by 30.5 m) site just north of 107th Street, spanning what is now 352 Riverside Drive. The site immediately to the north at number 353 was acquired by Perez M. Stewart and H. Ives Smith, who took possession that June. Openhym, who is nonetheless listed as the owner of both sites in the houses' original building permit, hired Kohn to design a pair of five-story townhouses on the site. Kohn was a friend of Openhym, and both men were members of the Society for Ethical Culture, although at the time Kohn had designed relatively few buildings such as the old New York Evening Post Building and some houses in the Riverside–West 105th Street Historic District.

From the outset, the southern house at number 352 was owned by Openhym. Lydia A. Clark is recorded as having bought the northern house at number 353 from Openhym in 1901, paying about $125,000. The Clark family lived at number 353, the residence having been intended for Lydia's daughter, the soprano Hilda Kathryn Clark. Openhym lived in his house only a short time; he killed himself in 1903, upon which his house was valued at $90,000 (equivalent to $3,225,000 in 2025). His funeral was held in the house, and Openhym's widow, children, and servants remained there. Lydia gave the house in 1908 to her daughter Cora, who lived there with her husband—the banker William C. Poillon—along with their two daughters and several servants. The conman David Lamar is recorded as having lived at 352 Riverside Drive in 1913, when he was being investigated by Edward Lauterbach for lobbying.

Cora Poillon leased out 353 Riverside Drive in 1923; the occupant was Abraham Schultz, a shoemaker who converted it into a rooming house, with nine lodgers there by 1925. The Openhyms sold number 352 to Rosa Canfield in 1926. The next year, Ida Rosoff requested a permit to open a restaurant and dance floor on the first and second stories of 353 Riverside Drive, at which point the Poillon family still owned number 353. The restaurant and dance floor, which would have been one of Riverside Drive's only businesses at the time, was defeated after residents of the avenue spoke in favor of keeping the avenue a "strictly residential zone". The Poillon family sold number 353 to Mary J. Lyons in 1927, and Lyons in turn sold it to the City Real Estate Company. City Real Estate continued leasing 353 Riverside Drive to Ida Rosoff and Lena Schultz until 1930, when Rosa Canfield and her husband Amos bought that house as well; they rented out number 353 while living next door at number 352. After Rosa died in 1934, Amos inherited her real estate. The next year, Amos split up number 353 into ten residences with three or four rooms each.

=== 1940s to present ===
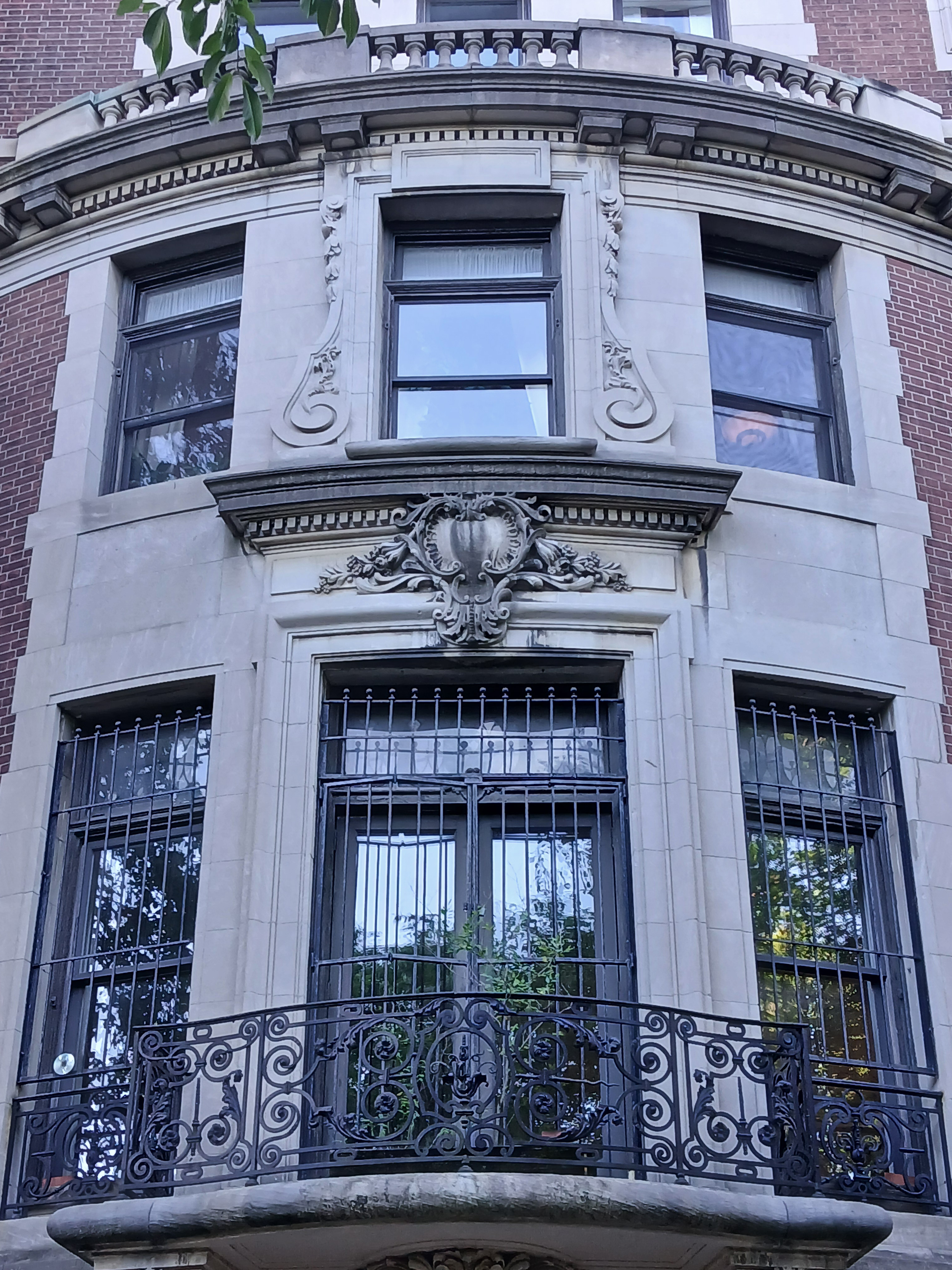
Detail of bowed fronts

Amos Canfield lived at number 352 and a summer residence at Candor, New York, until his death in 1942. Afterward, the houses became part of Woodstock College, a Jesuit seminary, which bought the houses at a real-estate auction in April 1943. The seminary renovated the houses, operating a dormitory in one house and classrooms in the other. There was a faculty residence at number 352 in the mid-20th century, but by 1971 that house was being used as a dormitory, with larger apartments than the seminary's other dormitories elsewhere in the Upper West Side and Morningside Heights.

In 1977, Woodstock resold number 352 to the hedge fund broker Jim Rogers. After Woodstock contacted Rogers, he agreed to pay $107,300 (equivalent to $570,000 in 2025) and received a $62,300 mortgage from Woodstock (equivalent to $331,000 in 2025), at a time when mortgage loans were scarce. Number 353 was sold to a syndicate between Diane Taxson and Donald Porter. Taxson and Porter converted number 353 into a housing cooperative, selling apartments for $15,000–40,000 each (equivalent to $80,000–213,000 in 2025). These apartments initially attracted a variety of professionals, including teachers, doctors, and university faculty. Taxson and Porter gave the New York Landmarks Conservancy a preservation easement, which gave Taxson and Porter a tax abatement but restricted modifications to 353 Riverside Drive's exterior for 30 years.

The houses were listed on the National Register of Historic Places in 2005. The psychologist Helen LaKelly Hunt, a daughter of the oil magnate H. L. Hunt, bought 352 Riverside Drive from Jim Rogers in 2008 for $15.75 million; at the time, it was the costliest town house ever sold on the Upper West Side. Hunt resold number 352 in 2018 for $11.6 million to an anonymous buyer, who in turn resold it in 2021 for $15.25 million.

== See also ==
- National Register of Historic Places listings in Manhattan from 59th to 110th Streets

== Sources ==
- Azzarone, Stephanie (2022). Heaven on the Hudson: Mansions, Monuments, and Marvels of Riverside Park. Fordham University Press. doi:10.2307/j.ctv2t5xg20.20. ISBN 978-1-5315-0102-0. JSTOR j.ctv2t5xg20.
- National Register of Historic Places Inventory/Nomination: Townhouses at 352 and 353 Riverside Dr (PDF) (Report). National Park Service. 2005. Archived (PDF) from the original on August 19, 2026.
- Riverside-West End Historic District Extension II Designation Report (PDF) (Report). New York City Landmarks Preservation Commission. June 23, 2015. pp. 8, 10. Archived (PDF) from the original on September 21, 2020.
