= Vesey Street =

East-west street in Lower Manhattan, New York

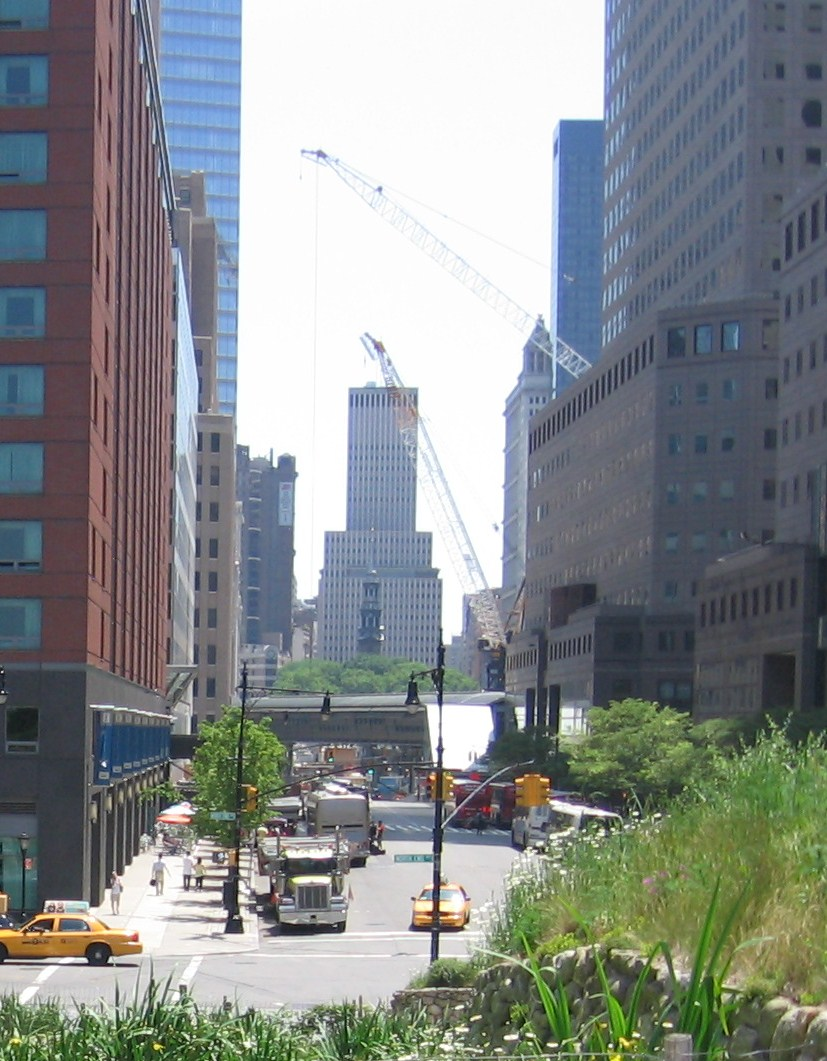
Looking east from the Irish Hunger Memorial, with 3 World Financial Center on the right, and St. Paul's Chapel and 222 Broadway in the distance

Vesey Street (/ˈviːzi/ VEE-zee) is a street in New York City that runs east-west in Lower Manhattan. The street is named after Rev. William Vesey (1674–1746), the first rector of nearby Trinity Church.

== History ==
The intersection of Vesey and West Streets was the site of the Washington Market, the city's main produce market. Established in 1812, its location near the docks facilitated the movement of goods.

Prior to the construction of the World Trade Center it ran as a continuous street from Broadway to the Hudson River. As of 2013, it is still a continuous street, but it has four discontinuous segments with mixed uses:

- From Broadway to Church Street for motor vehicles and pedestrians.
- From Church Street to West Street for authorized motor vehicles and pedestrians. This portion was widened during construction of the World Trade Center, and separates WTC on the street's south side from the Verizon Building on the street's north side.
- In Battery Park City, from West Street to North End Avenue for motor vehicles and pedestrians.
- From North End Avenue to River Terrace and the Irish Hunger Memorial, for pedestrians only.

The eastern extension of the street at Broadway is Ann Street.

== Architecture ==
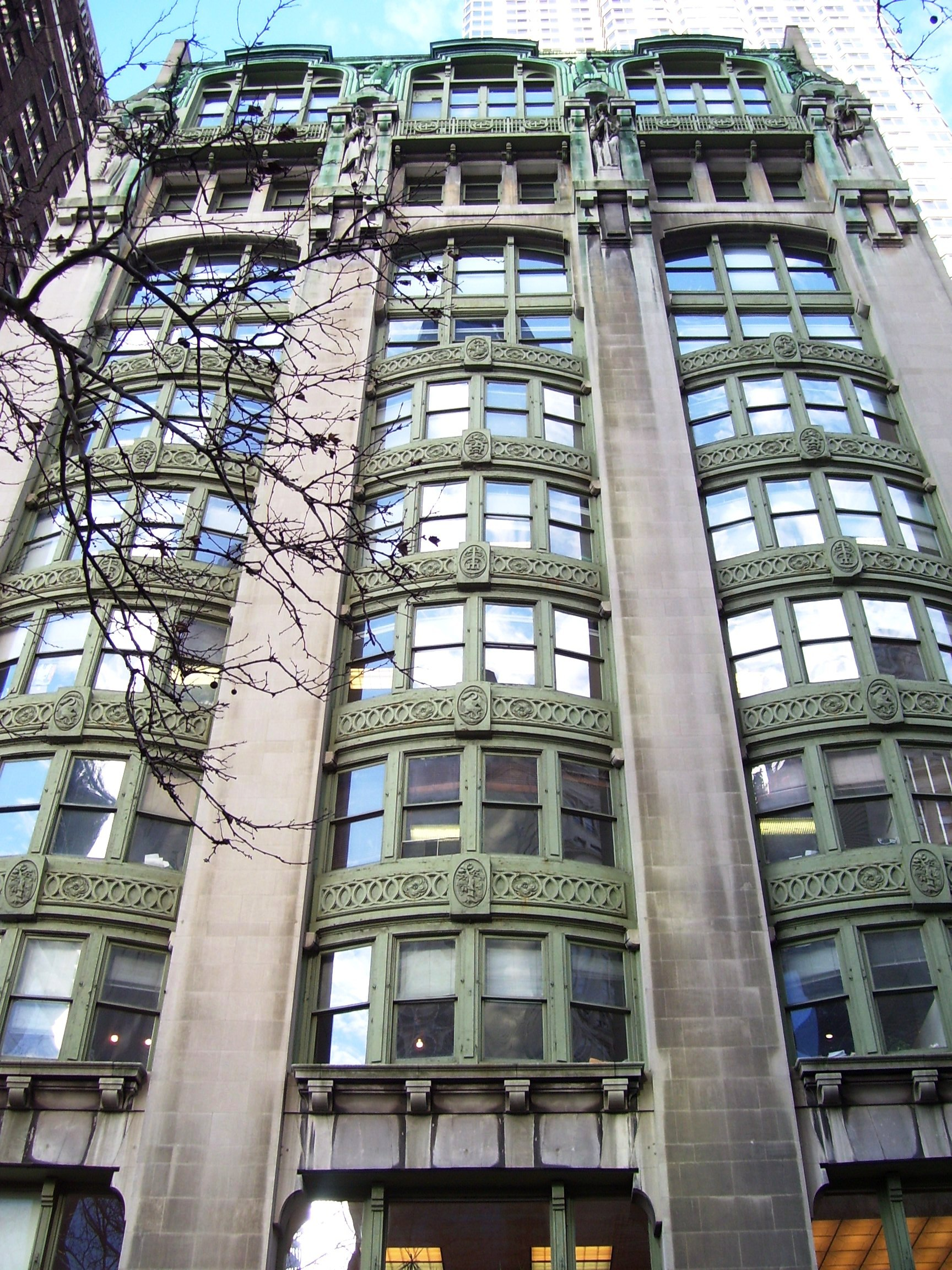
The Old New York Evening Post Building

Designed by Robert D. Kohn in the Art Nouveau style, the Old New York Evening Post Building at 20 Vesey Street was completed in 1907. It was designated as a New York City landmark in 1965 and added to the National Register of Historic Places in 1977.

The Barclay–Vesey Building occupies the entire block bounded by West Street to the west, Barclay Street to the north, Vesey Street to the south, and Washington Street to the east. Built in 1923, it served as the corporate headquarters of New York Telephone Company (NYTel). Verizon maintains a presence at this location, although its headquarters is now in Midtown. The Art Deco building was designated as a New York City landmark in 1991 and added to the National Register of Historic Places in 2009.

Adjacent to Vesey Street is St. Paul's Chapel, the Church Street Station Post Office, and the World Trade Center. The street next to the World Trade Center was closed to pedestrians after the terrorist attacks of September 11, 2001, and has not yet been reopened to vehicular traffic. A structure left standing after the collapse of the adjacent buildings is known as the Survivors' Staircase which has been preserved and can be viewed in the National September 11 Memorial & Museum. The World Trade Center PATH station is accessible from the street at the World Trade Center site.

At 230 is the Brookfield Place, a high-end commercial, retail, and office complex. Originally was known as the World Financial Center (WFC), but it was renamed after major renovations in 2014.

Just past the western end of the street is the Irish Hunger Memorial. This end of the street is in the northern part of Battery Park City.

Vesey Street was the birthplace of The Great Atlantic and Pacific Tea Company, the retail group more commonly known as "A&P."

== Transportation ==
The western traffic portion of Vesey Street is used by the eastbound M20 and westbound M22 buses, the latter of which terminates. On the eastern traffic portion, the M55 crosses Vesey on Church Street northbound and Broadway southbound.

== Gallery ==
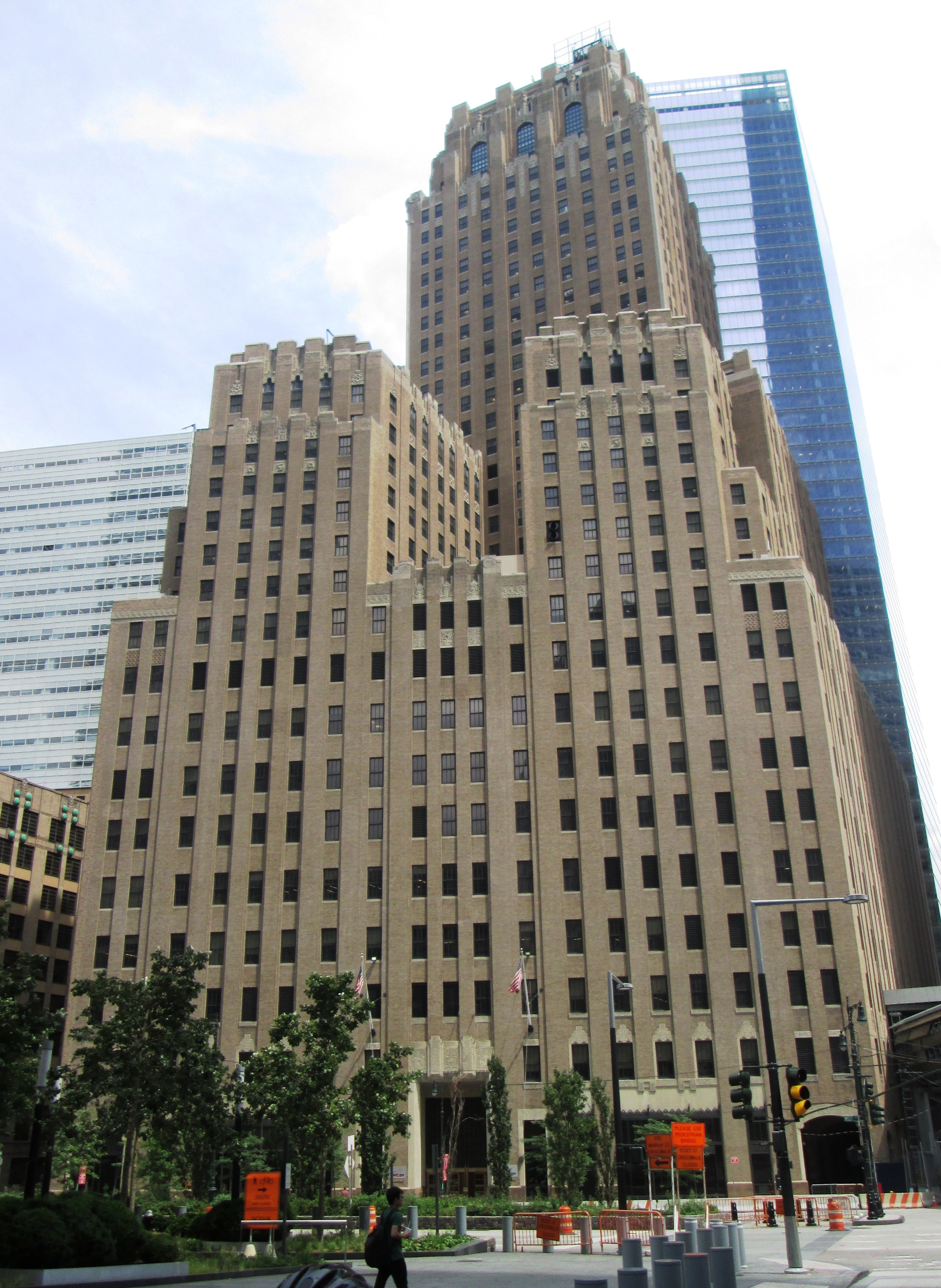
The Art Deco Barclay-Vesey Building

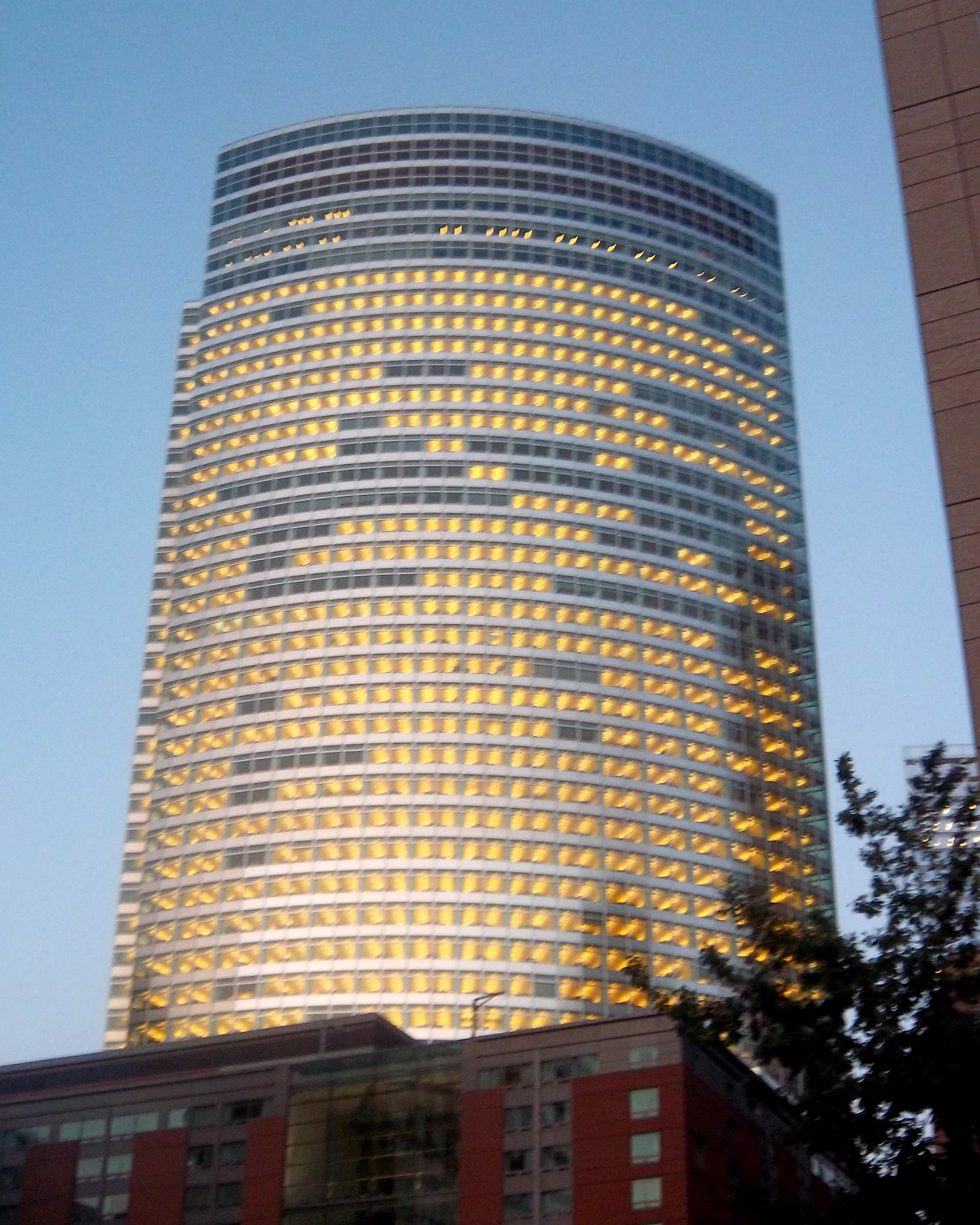
The Goldman Sachs Tower

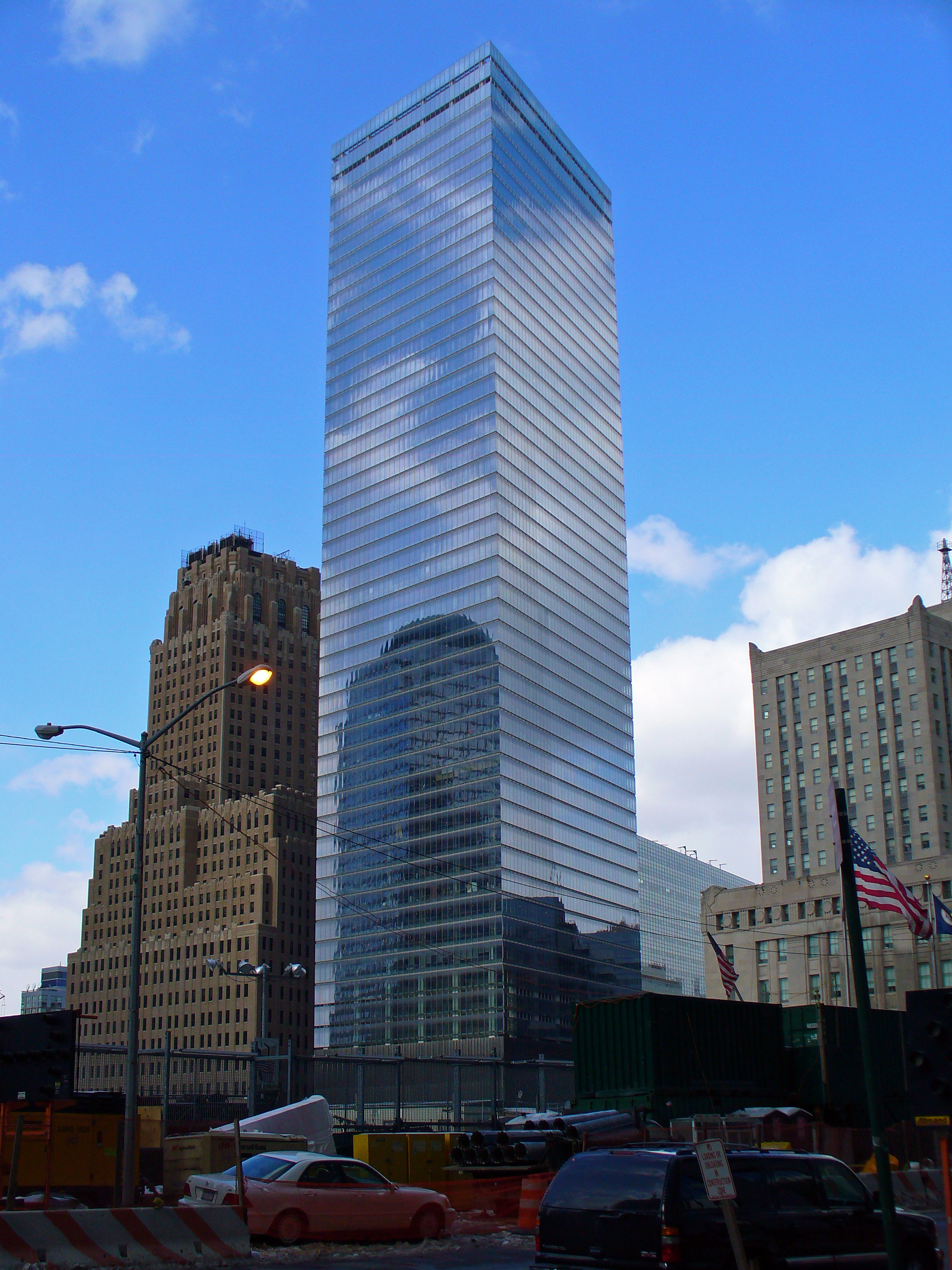
7 World Trade Center
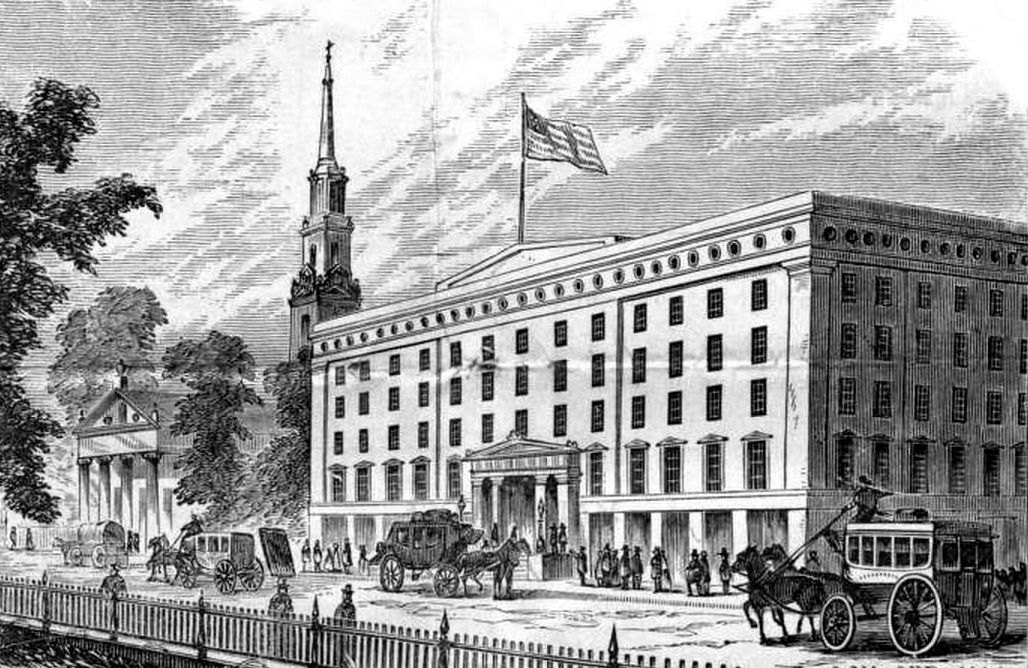
The Astor House restaurant, on the corner of Broadway and Vesey, in 1862

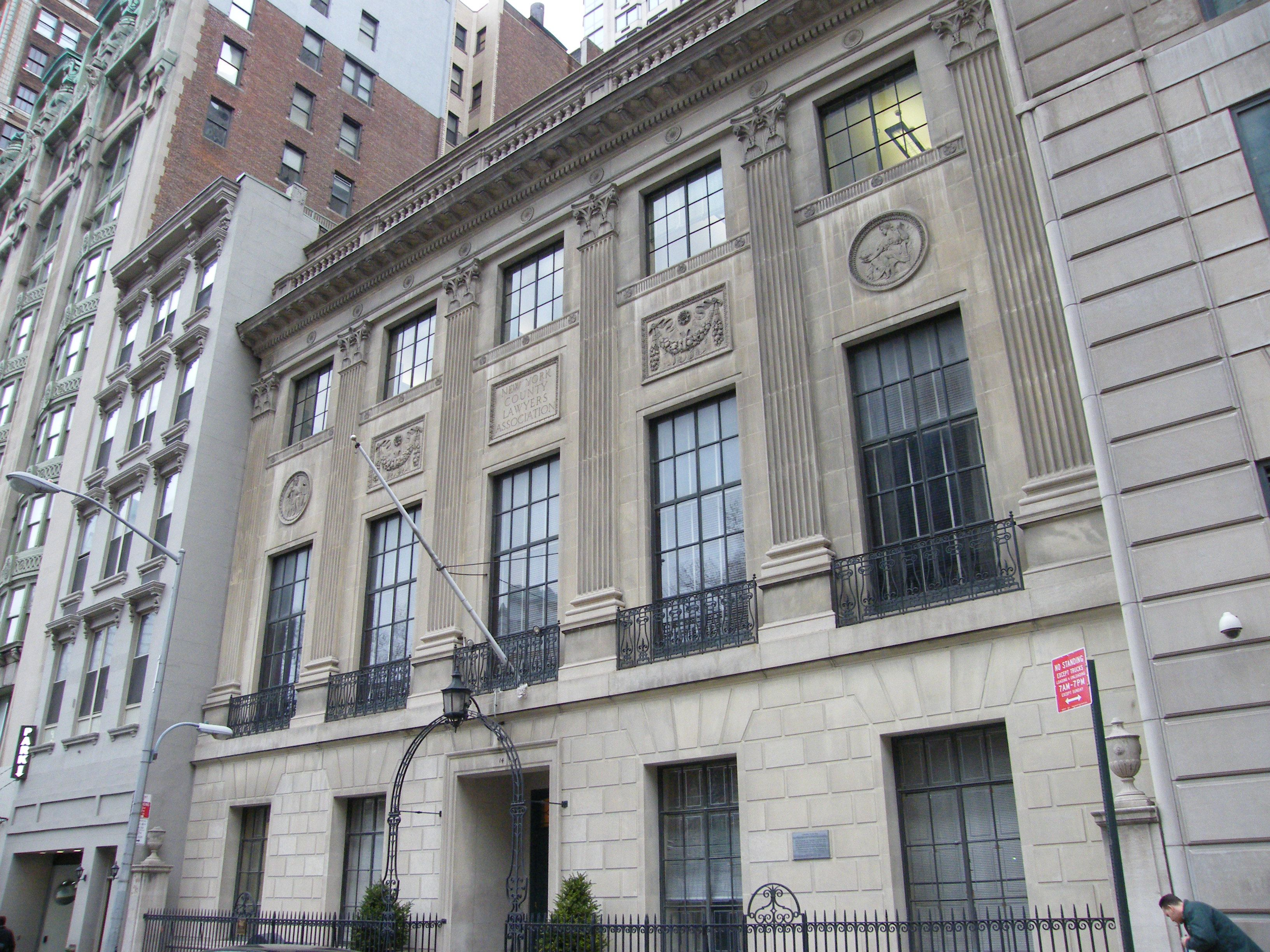
New York County Lawyers Association Building, a city landmark

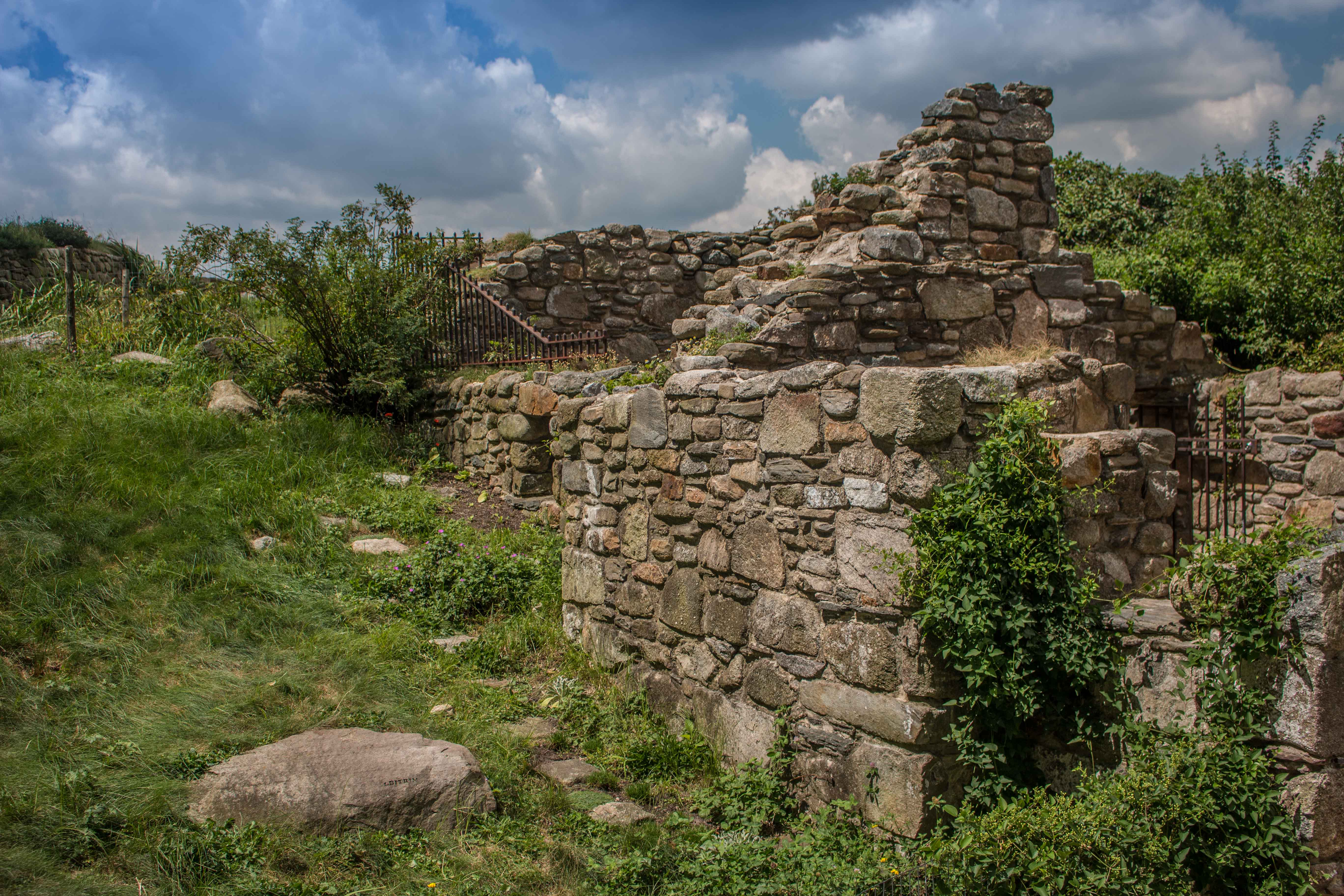
Part of the Irish Hunger Memorial, which lies at the foot of Vesey Street

== See also ==
- 200 Vesey Street - American Express Tower
