= H. Black and Company Building =

United States historic place

- U.S. National Register of Historic Places
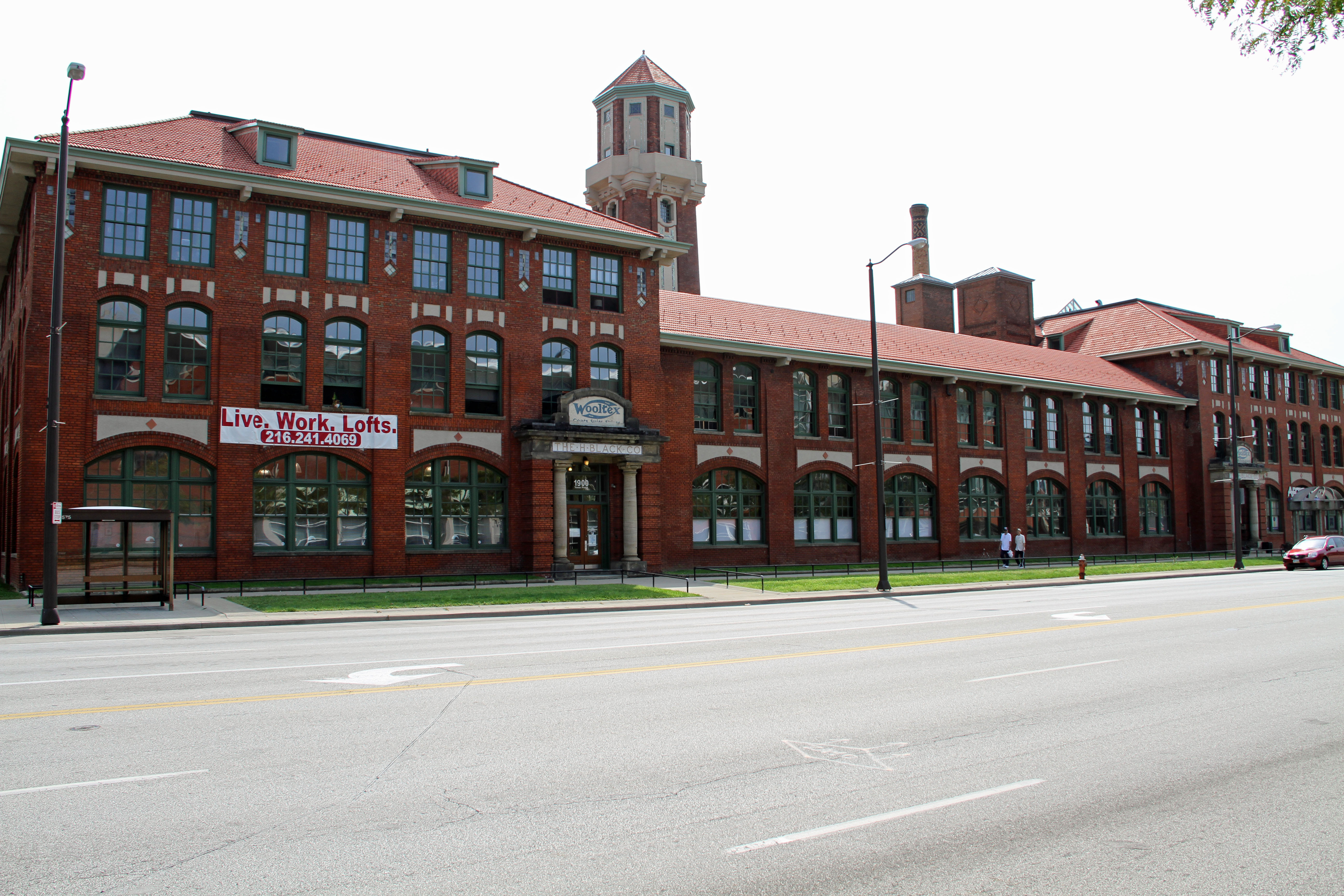

- Location within Cleveland Location within Ohio Location within the United States
- Location: 1900 Superior Avenue, Cleveland, Ohio, U.S.
- Coordinates: 41°30′24″N 81°40′45″W
- Built: 1907
- Architect: Robert D. Kohn
- Architectural style: Mission Revival
- Website: towerpressdevelopment.com
- NRHP reference No.: 01001523
- Added to NRHP: January 24, 2002

The H. Black and Company Building is a historic former factory building located in Cleveland, Ohio, in the United States. It was commissioned by H. Black and Company, one of the largest manufacturers of women's clothing in the United States, and designed by noted New York City architect Robert D. Kohn. Completed in 1907, it won national praise for its design. The building was sold in 1928 to the Evangelical Press, and for a short time was known as the Evangelical Press Building. The commercial printing business of the Evangelical Press was spun off as a secular company, Tower Press, in 1934, after which the structure became known as the Tower Press Building. Vacant for much of the 1960s and 1970s, the building had two different owners in the 1980s and was nearly demolished. A new owner took over the building in 2000, after which it underwent an award-winning renovation and restoration. The structure was added to the National Register of Historic Places on January 24, 2002. The structure now serves as a mixed-use development for low- and moderate-income artists.

== Constructing the building ==
The ready-to-wear clothing industry in the United States grew significantly after the American Civil War. Although Cleveland never had a clothing industry as large as that found in New York City or Chicago, it was one of the largest regional clothing manufacturing centers and the textile industry employed a significant percentage of the city's residents. Cleveland's garment industry was originally located in The Flats, but had moved to the Warehouse District by the start of the 20th century.

H. Black & Co. was one of Cleveland's largest garment manufacturing firms. Herman Black was a Hungarian Jew who emigrated to Toledo, Ohio, in 1854. He married 21-year-old Eva Judd, a Polish Jewish émigré, in 1863. Their son, Morris, was born in 1868. The Blacks moved to Cleveland in 1882, and in 1883 Herman founded H. Black & Company. The firm specialized in fine fabrics and ready-to-wear clothing, and became one of the largest coat and suit manufacturers in the world by 1915. The company focused primarily on women's clothing, which was marketed under the named Wooltex. Herman died in 1896. Morris graduated from Harvard in 1890, entered the family business, was named president of the company in 1903, and joined its board of directors in 1905.

About 1905, H. Black & Co. decided to move from the Warehouse District to a new location at E. 19th Street and Superior Avenue. At the time, this part of Cleveland was most single-family homes. The company commissioned noted New York City architect Robert D. Kohn to design a modern factory building for the company, making only minimal design requests: First, that the factory embody progressive ideas about worker comfort, and second, that the building's water tower be freestanding. To assist Kohn in developing ideas for the factory, H. Black & Co. paid for Kohn to tour the United States for a year, visiting existing factories and gathering ideas. The Samuel Austin & Son Company constructed the building, which was completed in the spring of 1907.

=== About the building ===
The Mission Revival, H. Black & Company factory was 283 feet (86 m) wide. The two-story central wing, which faced Superior Avenue, was 90 feet (27 m) deep. On either side were three-story wings which stretched back 144 feet (44 m). The frame was steel and the floors of reinforced concrete, It was the first reinforced concrete building constructed in Cleveland. The exterior and interior walls were plain brick. The mortar in the exterior walls was dyed purple (at a cost of $1 [$35 in 2025 dollars] per thousand bricks), and the raked joint both deeply incised and wider than usual. The exterior windows facing the street featured sandstone lintels and mullions. Blue and green tiles were applied in geometric patterns to the exterior walls below the eaves. The rear walls generally lacked any adornment or architectural detailing except for the blue and green tiles, as the company contemplated adding an addition to the rear in the future. The hip roof was covered in red tile and pierced by sawtooth skylights.

The structure had 130,680 square feet (12,141 m^{2}) of interior space. Each floor of the wings contained large dining, locker, and work rooms. Each of the main work rooms on the ground floor could accommodate 500 people, with another 200 workers scattered in other parts of the building. The walls and ceiling of the workrooms were white plaster, and the upper floors supported by concrete columns painted white. Two workmen were paid $60 ($2,073 in 2025 dollars) to stencil a two-color, geometric "weaving" pattern onto the upper parts of the columns and the transverse beams. Elsewhere in the building, small blue and green tiles with a geometric design were mortared to the interior walls near the cornice line. To provide the maximum space for manufacturing, staircases were placed along the firewalls, and numerous foul air exhaust and fresh air intake fans pierced the walls and ceiling.

The building had a pressurized sprinkler fire suppression system. To provide pressure for this system, a five-story, 130-foot (40 m), freestanding water tank was built at the rear of the central wing inside a brick and stucco tower. The ground floor of the tower contained a shipping room and toilet, while the second floor contained a storage room. Stucco panels adorned the sides of the tower, into which were set decorative colored tiles. A false balcony and parapet was added below the roof of the tower. Square below the balcony, the tower was octagonal above and a turret occupied the southwest corner.

The H. Black Building was widely praised nationally for creating a comfortable as well as beautiful workplace. Kohn strongly believed that a handsome building improved worker morale and productivity, and he was highly critical of architects who failed to adopt this view. "It is true of the mill engineer and unfortunately, of many architects that they consider the proper method of beautification of a factory building the application of pressed brick and a stone cornice to the exposed fronts of buildings otherwise stupid in mass, arrangement and fenestration." The Plain Dealer newspaper declared that the building was "positively pretty" after its construction, and nearly 90 years later was still calling it "graceful" and "one of the city's most distinguished early 20th-century industrial buildings." Architectural critic A.A. Kalish in 1924 called it "one of the most attractive factory buildings in America". The building's distinctive tower won special praise. Architect A.A. Pollard lauded its bold use of color and the use of bright stucco panels against the dark brick where the plain, broader masses of the tower needed adornment. He also praised the way the architectural lines of the upper tower were emphasized.

In November 1913, H. Black & Co. purchased a lot 250 feet (76 m) deep to its south. This parcel, which fronted on both E. 19th and E. 21st Streets, was intended for the plant's expansion.

== History of the building ==
=== Evangelical Press Building ===
The Post–World War I recession of August 1918 to March 1919 and the Depression of 1920 to 1921 created significant economic distress for H. Black & Co. It merged with two other large local clothing manufacturers, the Printz-Biederman Co. and the M.T. Silver Co., in November 1922. The merged company closed the Superior Avenue factory. The city of Cleveland purchased the rear parcel (no addition was built there) in July 1924, and the May Co. purchased the plant itself the following September.

In February 1928, the Evangelical Association, a small Arminian Methodist denomination based in the Midwestern United States, purchased the empty H. Black & Co. factory from the May Co. for an undisclosed price. The denomination extensively renovated the plant, painting over much of the interior stencil and tile work and partitioning many of the larger rooms into offices. This left the building with just 114,000 square feet (10,600 m^{2}) of interior space. (Note: Various other reports put the interior space at 100,000 square feet (9,300 m^{2}) and 109,000 square feet (10,100 m^{2}), but this article uses the 114,000 square feet (10,600 m^{2}), which is the most recently cited.) The denomination moved its headquarters into the building on October 2, 1928. Taking up a large portion of the former workroom space was the Evangelical Press, the religious publishing arm of the Evangelical Association.

The renovated building now became known as the Evangelical Press Building. The church and press did not need all the space, however, and portions of the building were rented out to other tenants.

=== Tower Press Building ===
Between 1928 and 1934, the Evangelical Press began taking on secular print work. By 1934, this had become the majority of the press's income. At about the same time, the Evangelical Association decided to move its headquarters to Harrisburg, Pennsylvania. In October 1934, the Evangelical Press spun off its secular printing business as Tower Press, which was sold to the Evangelical Press's general manager, Charles J. Theuer. The Superior Avenue building was also sold to Tower Press, while the Evangelical Press followed its owner to Pennsylvania. The secular printing company took its name from the building's large water tower.

The building now became known as the Tower Press Building. Tower Press, like its predecessor, occupied only a portion of the structure, and over the next roughly 40 years a variety of tenants, such as an engineering firm, advertising agency, thermostat manufacturer, furniture store, and college took space in the rest of the building. In 1959, the Better Bedding Co. moved into the first floor.

In July 1963, A.S. Gilman and Tower Press, by then Cleveland's two largest printing companies, merged. Tower Press vacated its namesake building, although the merged company continued to own the structure. In 1971, the Nicole Corp., a manufacturer of lamp shades, rented the top two floors of the Tower Press Building.

=== Ownership changes and stalled developments of the 1980s and 1990s ===
Some time in the late 1970s, real estate development company Weston Limited, owned brothers Edward J. and Anthony J. Asher, bought the Tower Press Building. Although much of the building had been empty in the 1960s and 1970s, the Ashers sought to rejuvenate the building by offering space at low rents to small businesses and artists. By December 1981, it had become "a beehive of shops".

In 1986, Weston Limited declined to renew the leases of its tenants. The company said it hoped to either renovate or sell the building, but neither happened and the building sat empty.

In December 1990, the Tower Press Building was purchased by a new company, Tower Press Building Inc., for about $1.2 million ($3,000,000 in 2025 dollars). A joint partnership of local attorneys Murray Bilfield, Robert Meyers, and Martin L. Sandel, the company hoped to sell the eastern third of the building for $600,000 ($1,500,000 in 2025 dollars). The firm hoped to use these funds to redevelop the decrepit western two-thirds of the building into offices. (Note: By 1990, the building was in poor condition. The exterior was covered with soot generated by the heavy industry which the city formerly boasted from 1900 to 1960. The heating plant had failed, and the exterior brickwork, roof, and floors were beginning to buckle due to winter freezing and spring thawing. The tower had lost many of its decorative tiles and stucco panel, and was in danger of collapse.) By 1993, however, no renovation had occurred, despite the sale of the eastern portion of the structure to local silkscreen printing company owner Dan Gray. The city of Cleveland now began entering into negotiations to turn the rear parcel on the block (which it had purchased back in 1924 and turned into a parking lot) over to the developers to help push the renovation forward.

The parking lot transfer never happened. The Cleveland Division of Building and Housing then ordered the developers to either bring the building up to code or demolish it. The partners chose demolition. Then the Cleveland Landmarks Commission voted unanimously on June 8, 1994, to place a six-month bar on any demolition work (a ban which could be extended to 12 months, but no further). The angry developers sued the city, arguing the city had breached a contract to sell the parking lot to them and had undermined their renovation project by failing to maintain and repair the adjacent Cuyahoga County Criminal Courts Building. The city rejected the claim that any agreement had been reached. On October 20, 1994, the Landmarks Commission unanimously reversed itself to allow the demolition to go forward. The developers put off the demolition after filing a $5 million ($10,900,000 in 2025 dollars) lawsuit in federal court against the city for losses incurred during the previous four years.

With the federal lawsuit holding demolition in abeyance, the building began to draw interest from other investors. In August 1996, the local news media reported that the city was seeking to expand the Chinatown district along Superior Avenue to encompass the Tower Press Building. Yuchai Machinery Corp., an engine manufacturer and real estate developer based in China, expressed interest in buying the structure. Investor interest rose again in 1997 when the city decided to demolish Cuyahoga County Criminal Courts Building. (Note: Demolition was intended to begin in early June 1997, but did not begin until December.) Yuchai informed the city in September 1997 that it was no longer interested in the structure in September 1997.

By 1999, the freeze-thaw cycle had taken such a toll on the Tower Press Building that architects worried it could not last more than two more years without extensive renovation and conservation.

In October 1999, ArtSpace Projects, a Minneapolis-based developer of artist loft apartments, expressed its interest in the Tower Press Building. The company tentatively agreed to purchase the building for $1 million ($1,900,000 in 2025 dollars) and spend $6.2 million ($12,000,000 in 2025 dollars) creating 47 studio/apartments and ground-floor retail space in the structure. The deal was contingent on ArtSpace winning $2.2 million ($4,300,000 in 2025 dollars) in state low-income tax credits and $870,000 ($1,700,000 in 2025 dollars) in federal historic preservation tax credits. ArtSpace said it needed to win the credits immediately so that it could replace the roof by winter. When certain aspects of the project fell through in late May 2000, ArtSpace backed out of the purchase.

== 2000 to 2003 renovation ==
Nine days after ArtSpace canceled its purchase agreement, the Cleveland-based Charge Development Co. expressed its interest in the building. Brothers David and Doug Perkowski, co-owners of Charge Development, proposed remodeling the building into 89 loft apartments, with about 20 percent of these set aside for low-income individuals. The city of Cleveland approved on June 22, 2000, a $2 million ($3,700,000 in 2025 dollars) low-interest loan (Note: This was later changed to a $1.2 million ($2,200,000 in 2025 dollars) loan and a $700,000 ($1,300,000 in 2025 dollars) grant.) and a 12-year tax abatement program for the renovation. (Note: In years one through five, 75 percent of property taxes would be forgiven. In years six through ten, 50 percent of property taxes would be forgiven. In years 11 and 12, 25 percent of property taxes would be forgiven.) The building's four owners agreed to sell the structure to Charge Development for $750,000 ($1,400,000 in 2025 dollars) in late November. Charge Development created a subsidiary, Tower Press Ltd., to develop the building.

The renovation began in February 2001. The majority of financing came from National City Community Development Corp. Tower Press Ltd. hired Fortney & Weygandt Inc., a general contractor located in North Olmsted, Ohio, to oversee the project. It in turn hired non-unionized subcontractors, and demolition of the interior began. The building was by then in such bad shape that the roof was close to collapse. It fell in during the renovation, and had to be replaced.

Two significant delays occurred early in the renovation. The first delay in the renovation occurred in spring 2001. Work on the demolition halted in March as the City Planning Commission debated the parking lot lease. On April 28, after a two-month delay, the agency agreed to lease the lot to Tower Press Ltd. for $1 a year. Tower Press agreed to spend $233,000 ($400,000 in 2025 dollars) to rebuild the parking lot, and to set aside 113 of the 230 spaces for use by the Cleveland Division of Police. The second delay occurred in May 2001. Some members of the Cleveland City Council were angered by the use of non-union contractors, and felt the city's loan to Tower Press Ltd. should be withdrawn. The city council only agreed to allow the loan to go forward on May 14, and only after four of 13 subcontractors working on the building reported they now employed union workers.

The unresolved unionization issue continued to trouble the project. Local 310 of the Laborers' International Union of North America, threatened to picket the project if work resumed, and filed a lawsuit against the city claiming the loan and grant had been made unlawfully. When work resumed in August, Local 310, the Cleveland chapter of the AFL–CIO, and Jobs with Justice (a union advocacy group) began picketing. The picketing went on for about two weeks, and allegedly some picketers threw rocks at and spit on nonunion workers. Tower Press Ltd. won a temporary restraining order barring picketing on September 10, although this was lifted five days later when union officials agreed to enforce peaceful behavior among their members. Picketing lasted periodically until the renovation was complete.

The Tower Press Building opened in March 2003. The total cost of the renovation was $10 million ($17,500,000 in 2025 dollars). At the time of its opening, the building featured 16 apartments, ranging in size from 700 to 1,200 square feet (65 to 111 m^{2}), at below-market rents that began at $350 a month ($613 in 2025 dollars) and topped out at $675 a month ($1,181 in 2025 dollars). Market-rate units went for $425 a month ($724 in 2025 dollars) for a small efficiency up to $2,200 a month ($3,750 in 2025 dollars) for a three-bedroom apartment.

=== Renovation awards ===
The renovation of the Tower Press Building won two awards. In July 2003, the Cleveland Restoration Society bestowed one of its 2003 Preservation Awards on Charge Development and Sandvick Architects, and in February 2004 the Downtown Cleveland Partnership, a nonprofit economic development agency, awarded Charge Development one of its Ruth Ratner Miller Award for helping to promote and improve downtown Cleveland.

=== Post-renovation history ===
The Tower Press Building contained 8,000 square feet (740 m^{2}) of ground-floor retail space. The first major retail tenant was Artefino, a coffeehouse and art gallery owned by noted Cleveland artist Hector Vega. Vega announced his intent in December 2001, and the café opened in June 2004. Fifteen months after its opening, the building's retail space was 95 percent leased and included a catalogue business, a communications firm, and an educational firm offering computer training. In February 2007, the improvisational comedy group Something Dada announced its performance space was moving to the Wooltex Room in the Tower Press Building.

City and development officials had hoped that the Tower Press Building renovation would spark a redevelopment renaissance in the Campus District of Cleveland. By 2013, however, little development had emerged. David Perkowski (now doing business as Tower Press Development Co.) purchased the M.T. Silver Building at 2320 Superior Avenue for $675,000 in 2007, and the Bloch Building at 2310 Superior Avenue for $675,000 in 2013. City anticipated that these redevelopments, as well as Cleveland State University's transformation from a commuter school into a residential campus, would spark new housing redevelopment in the area.

=== About the renovated building ===
The 2000–2003 renovation of the Tower Press Building was designed by architect Julie Kotapish of Sandvick Architects, a Cleveland firm.

The renovation retained the structure's Mission Revival architectural style. Much of the building's historic elements were retained, including all existing exterior and interior brick, columns, decorative tiles, lintels, mullions, and sills. Although the red tile roof collapsed during the renovation, it was replaced with nearly identical red clay tile.

The interior of the renovated building features exposed brick walls and post-and-beam construction, open ceilings, and visible ductwork. Wooden doors were reclaimed from area factories and used for hallway doors. The first-floor showroom was repurposed as an art gallery and performance space, painted white, and renamed the Wooltex Room. The water tower was converted into a single, five-level apartment. The three upper floors are uninsulated and for warm-weather use only. As a historic structure, the building lacks an elevator and fire stairs.

Although original plans called for 89 units, the completed renovated building contains 80 lofts and apartments on its second and third floors. Many larger apartments feature studio space. The building's original design as a factory was incorporated into the layout of the apartments, and each apartment's floor plan is unique.

The developers had hoped to renovate the ground floor into 10,000 square feet (930 m^{2}) of retail space, but the completed structure has just 10,000 square feet (930 m^{2}).

Building amenities originally included a fitness center, laundry, and a secure surface parking lot. The building was one of the first renovations in Cleveland to feature high-speed Internet in every unit.

== Bibliography ==
- Avery, Elroy McKendree (1918). A History of Cleveland and Its Environs: The Heart of New Connecticut. Chicago: Lewis Publishing Co.
- Bluestone, Daniel M., ed. (1978). Cleveland: An Inventory of Historic Engineering and Industrial Sites. Washington, D.C.: Historic American Engineering Record, U.S. Department of the Interior. hdl:2027/uiug.30112024125988.
- Bradley, Betsy Hunter (1999). The Works: The Industrial Architecture of the United States. New York: Oxford University Press. ISBN 9780195090000.
- Kohn, Robert D. (February 1909). "Architecture and Factories". The Architectural Record: 131–136.
- Pollard, A.A. (November 1911). "Water Towers". The Western Architect: 100–102. hdl:2027/mdp.39015082454631.
