= Spero Building =

Building in Manhattan, New York

Coordinates: 40.740843°N 73.991932°W

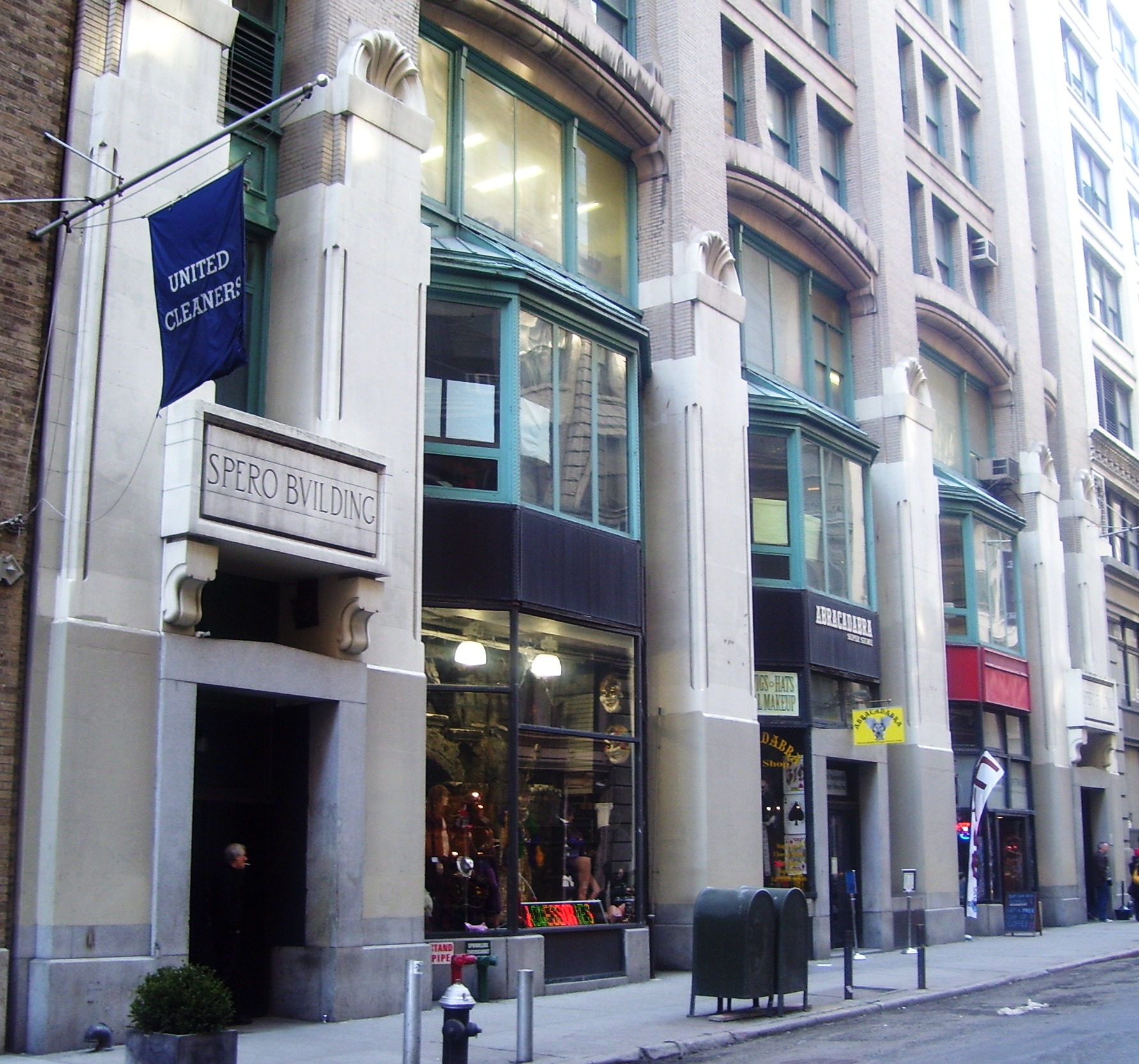
- The street facade of the Spero Building
- Interactive map of the Spero Building area

General information
- Architectural style: Art Nouveau
- Location: 19-27 West 21st Street; Manhattan, New York City, New York
- Construction started: 1907
- Completed: 1908
- Cost: $350,000

Height
- Height: 150 feet (46 m)

Technical details
- Floor count: 12

Design and construction
- Architect: Robert D. Kohn
- Developer: David Spero

The Spero Building is a twelve-story building put up by David Spero at 19-27 West 21st Street in the Flatiron District neighborhood of Manhattan, New York City. Built in 1907–08, the store-and-loft edifice, which was designed by Robert D. Kohn in the Art Nouveau style, is located between Fifth and Sixth Avenues, and within the Ladies' Mile Historic District. Spero, a millinery goods wholesaler, purchased the site of the building from Benjamin Stern, and rented space in the completed building to "embroiderers, shirtwaist merchants, and cloak and suit merchants, all characteristic tenants in the district".

The building's frontage measures 104.6 feet (31.9 m), and the facade is composed of limestone, and buff-colored brick. The entire structure cost approximately $350,000 to build.
