= Robert D. Kohn =

American architect (1870–1953)

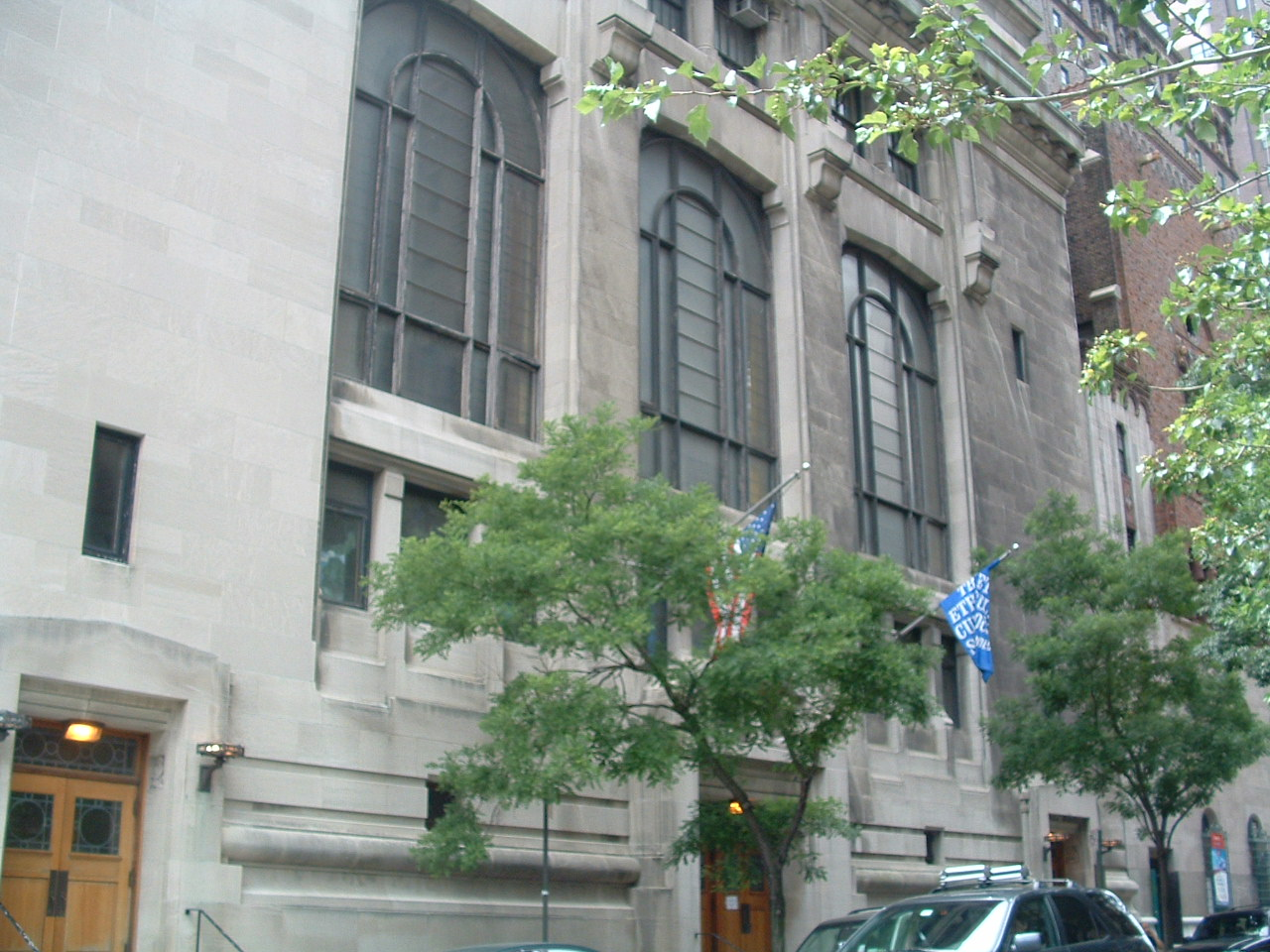
Restrained detailing, New York Society for Ethical Culture, 1911

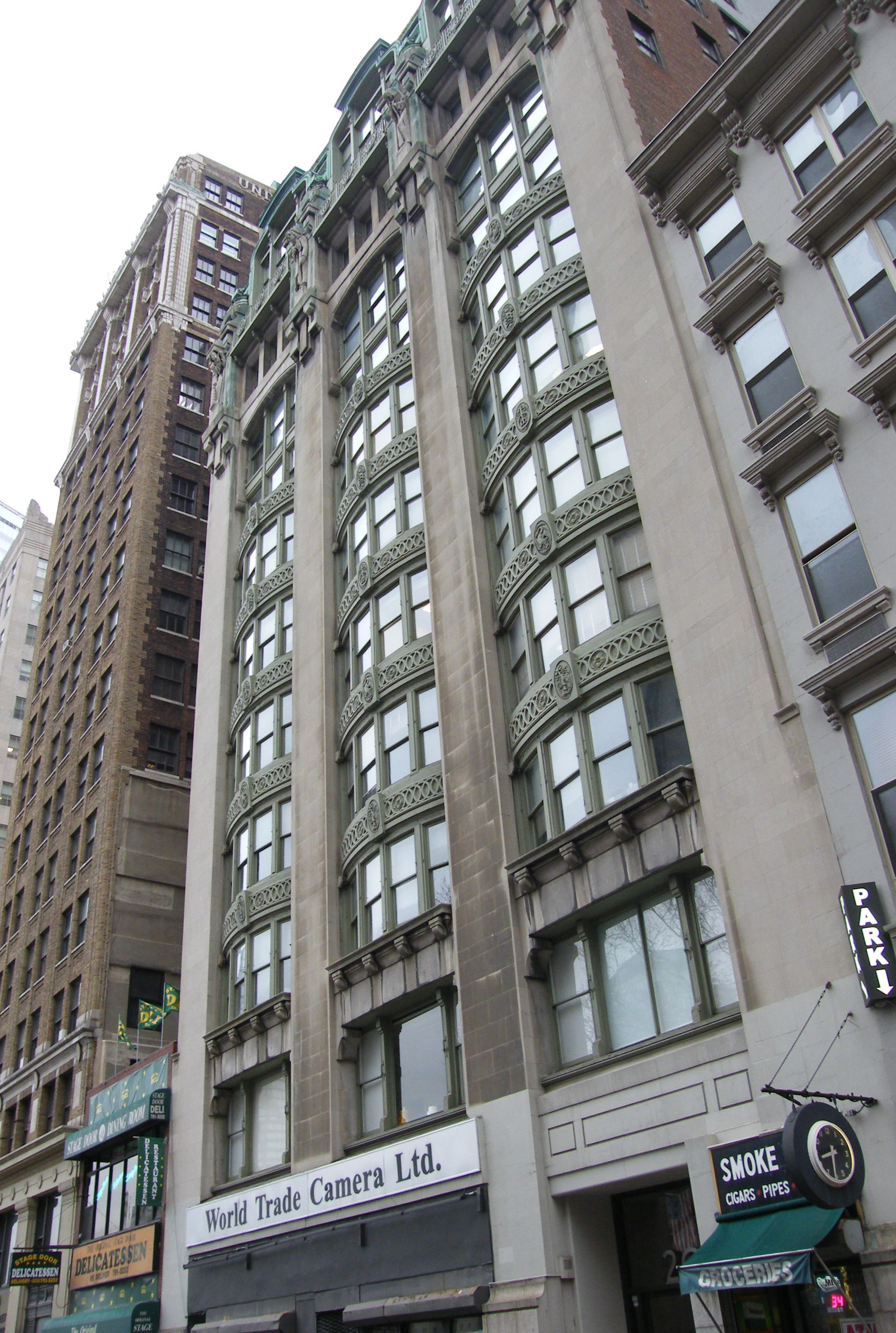
Old New York Evening Post Building, 1907

Robert D. Kohn (May 12, 1870 – June 16, 1953) was an American architect most active in New York City.

== Life and career ==
Kohn was born in Manhattan, attended Columbia University, and spent four years at the Ecole des Beaux-Arts in Paris, from 1891 through 1895. After brief stints for other architects, he established an independent practice in 1896. In 1905 he married sculptor Estelle Rumbold of St. Louis, Missouri.

His first building of note was the Vienna Sezession-detailed Old New York Evening Post Building (1906–07), 20 Vesey Street, one of the limited number of Art Nouveau structures in New York. Stacks of convex copper-framed windows press forward between unrelieved limestone piers. Of the four sculpted figures in the uppermost floors, two are by Kohn's wife, and the other two are by Gutzon Borglum.

He designed the hall for the Society for Ethical Culture (Central Park West and 64th Street, 1911) and had formerly collaborated with Carrère and Hastings on the adjoining Ethical Culture school building (1902). "Like Christian Science, the Ethical Culture movement was searching for its own form - it had no historic precedents from which to draw. Kohn's exterior, all Bedford limestone, took its cornice and base course lines from the adjacent school, but nothing else. Instead of the school's broad window facing Central Park, the meeting house has wide, limestone expanses, like a mausoleum, and simply, blocky detailing." (Stern et al.)

He worked in association with his brother, Victor H. Kohn, who died in New York, 4 May 1910, aged thirty-eight. In 1918 he was a founding member of the Technical Alliance, organized for the purpose of undertaking an energy survey of North America, for the reconsideration of the workings of the entire social system; their work was continued by Technocracy Inc.

From 1917 through the early 1950s Kohn collaborated, formally and informally, with fellow architect Charles Butler. In the 1920s they became well known for their temples and other structures for the Reform Jewish congregations of New York, notably the discreetly modernist Congregation Emanu-El of the City of New York on Fifth Avenue (1927–29) and for the New York Society for Ethical Culture, of which he had been a member since early youth. The Congregation Emanuel-El blends a conservative modernism with Neo-Romanesque precedents, stripped of its literal historicisms. The west end of Emanu-El, facing Central Park, is a single vastly-scaled entrance porch, infilled with stained glass under a round-headed arch. Buttressed wall permit an interior free of support, with a roof 103 feet above the floor. In 1953 he was elected into the National Academy of Design as an Associate Academician.

Another regular partner was Clarence Stein. Like Stein, in the 1930s and beyond Kohn would become recognized for his expertise in low-cost housing. Kohn also became President of the American Institute of Architects in 1930–32.

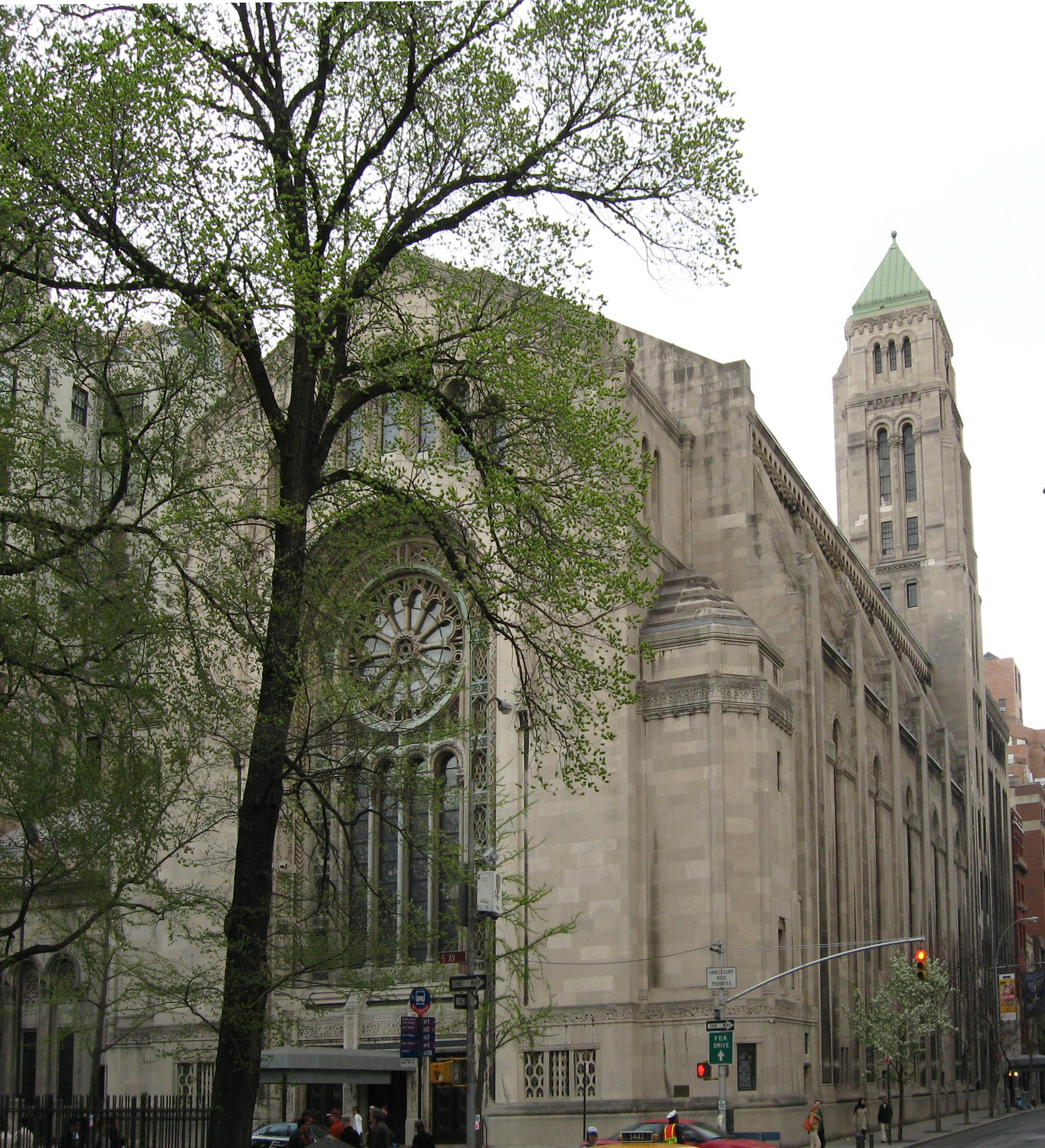
Congregation Emanu-El, 1927-29

== World's Fair 1939 ==
Kohn worked as the Chairman of the Committee on Theme for the 1939 New York World's Fair, a particularly influential body which governed almost the entirety of the expositions presented at the fair. In particular, Kohn's influence is attributed to implementing the "Fair of the Future" theme into the progressive and Beaux-Arts architecture of the exhibitors.

== Works ==
- Buildings in the Riverside–West 105th Street Historic District (1899–1902), Manhattan, New York
- Old New York Evening Post Building, 20 Vesey Street, Manhattan, New York City, 1906-07
- Spero Building, 19-27 West 21st Street, Manhattan, New York City, 1907-08
- Tower Press Building, dominated by a 130 feet (40 m) octagonal tower, Cleveland, Ohio, 1907
- A. I. Namm & Son Department Store, Brooklyn, with Charles Butler, 1924
- Macy's Herald Square expansion, Manhattan, 1924
- Ethical Culture Fieldston School, Bronx, with Clarence Stein, 1926
- Temple Emanu-El of New York on Fifth Avenue (1927–29)
- 352 and 353 Riverside Drive (1899), Manhattan, New York
