= Old New York Evening Post Building =

Historic commercial building in Manhattan, New York

- U.S. National Register of Historic Places
- New York State Register of Historic Places
- New York City Landmark
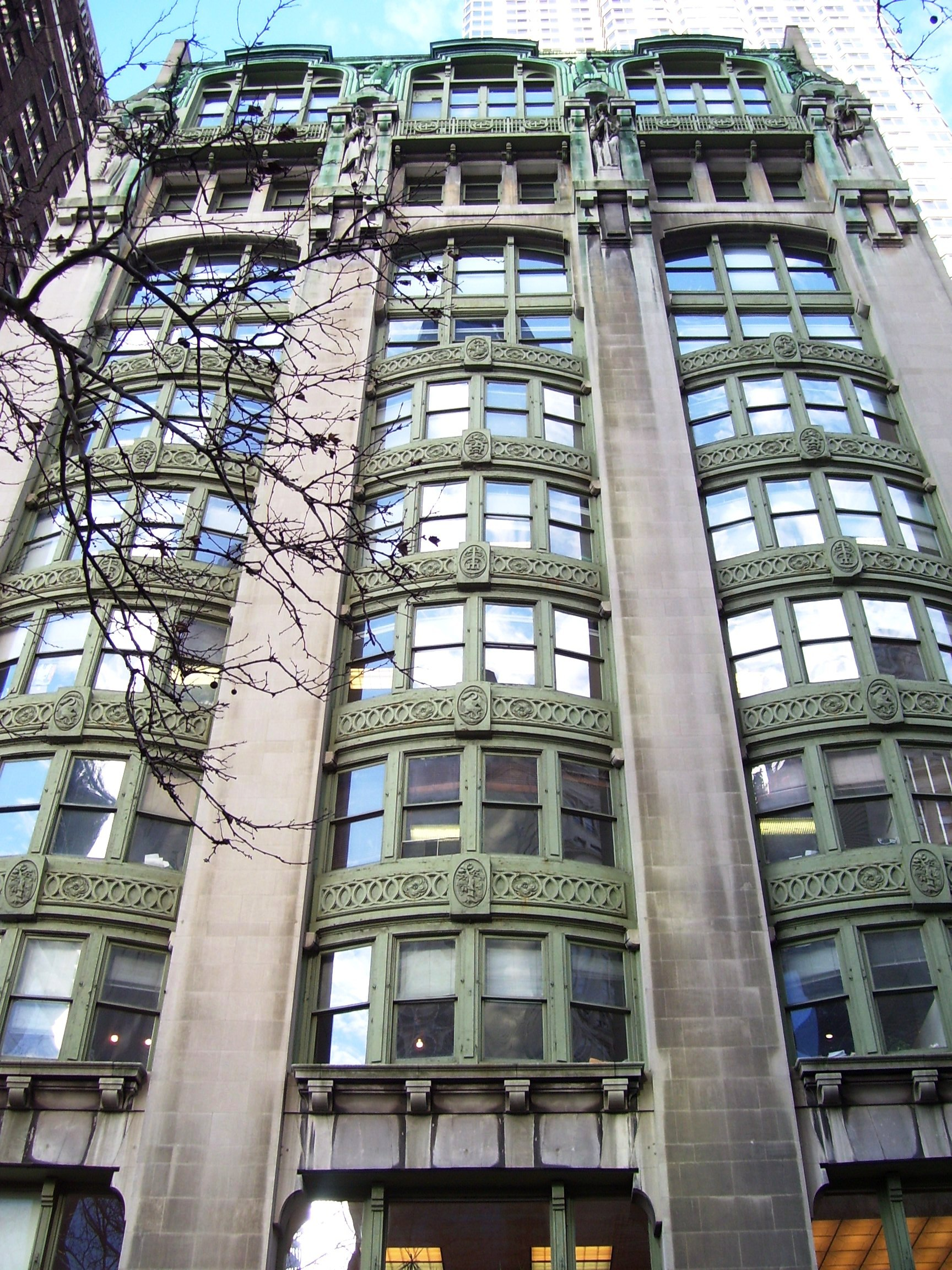
- The Old New York Evening Post Building in Manhattan in 2012

- Location within Lower Manhattan Location within New York Location within the United States
- Location: 20 Vesey Street, Manhattan, New York City
- Coordinates: 40°42′43″N 74°0′36″W
- Built: 1906–07
- Architect: Robert D. Kohn
- Architectural style: Art Nouveau
- NRHP reference No.: 77000963
- NYSRHP No.: 06101.000640
- NYCL No.: 0077

Significant dates
- Added to NRHP: August 16, 1977
- Designated NYSRHP: June 23, 1980
- Designated NYCL: November 13, 1965

The Old New York Evening Post Building is the former office and printing plant of the New York Evening Post newspaper located at 20 Vesey Street between Church Street and Broadway in the Financial District of Manhattan, New York City. It was built in 1906–07 and was designed by architect Robert D. Kohn for Oswald Garrison Villard, who owned the Post at the time, and is considered to be "one of the few outstanding Art Nouveau buildings" ever constructed in the United States.

The fourteen-story, stone-veneer building is "reminiscent of the buildings that line the boulevards of Paris", and was not copied from an existing building. It features three tall bays of cast-iron framed bow windows, separated by pale limestone piers. There is an elaborate copper-covered mansard roof, two stories high and four elaborate sculpted figures. The statues depict the Four Periods of Publicity; two are by Gutzon Borglum, sculptor of Mount Rushmore, and two by the architect's wife, Estelle Rumbold Kohn.

The New York Evening Post occupied the building until moving to the New York Evening Post Building in 1926.

The building, which was later called the Garrison Building, was designated a New York City landmark in 1965, and was added to the National Register of Historic Places in 1977. The New York Landmarks Preservation Commission was headquartered in the building from 1980 to 1987.

== See also ==
- List of New York City Designated Landmarks in Manhattan below 14th Street
- National Register of Historic Places listings in Manhattan below 14th Street
