= Burton Arms Apartments =

Coordinates: 40°51′19.22″N 73°54′17.95″W

Burton Arms Apartments was an edifice completed in December 1922, located at 2115 Walton Avenue and 181st Street in The Bronx, a borough of the U.S. city of New York, New York.

== Description ==
The building was one block from Lexington Avenue (Manhattan)-Jerome Avenue subway line. Advertised as the most beautiful apartment house in New York City, it could be reached via the 6th Avenue (Manhattan) - 9th Avenue (Manhattan) subway or the L at Burnside Avenue. Three-, four-, or five-room rentals were available. Burton Arms Apartments is important as an early 1920s structure which provided comfortable living quarters as well as accommodations for businesses.

On a plot 75 by 100 feet (23 by 30 m), it was purchased by Maurice Forman from Survell Realty Company in March 1923. At this time, it was completely rented, including its eight stores. The structure sold for $210,000, purchased from the Armstrong Brothers.

In 1926, Burton Arms Apartments brought an annual rental of $29,000. The edifice was sold to Joseph Wikler by the Harstein Brothers in October 1926.
