= Irish Hunger Memorial =

Memorial in New York City

Coordinates: 40°42′54.5″N 74°00′59.5″W

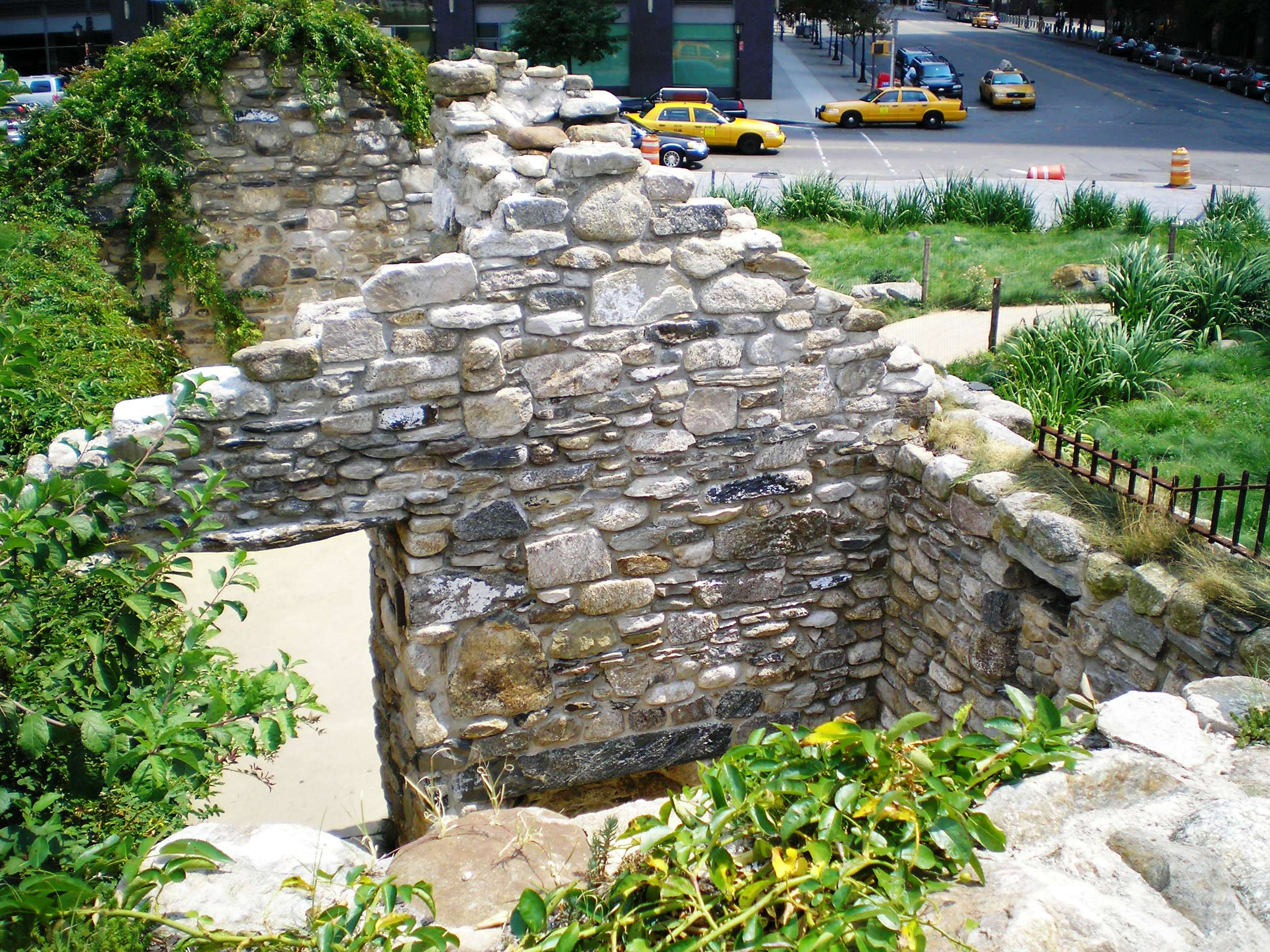
Irish Hunger Memorial cottage

The Irish Hunger Memorial (Irish: Cuimhneachán Ghorta Mhóir na hÉireann) is a 0.5-acre (0.20 ha) park at the corner of Vesey Street and North End Avenue in the Battery Park City neighborhood of Manhattan in New York City. The memorial is dedicated to raising awareness of the Great Irish Hunger, referred to as An Gorta Mór in Irish, in which over one million starved to death between 1845 and 1852. In the decade after 1845 over 900,000 Irish emigrants entered the port of New York so that by 1855 Irish-born New Yorkers composed almost one third of the city's population.

Construction of the memorial began in March 2001, and despite the September 11 attacks on the nearby World Trade Center, which also affected surrounding areas, the memorial was completed and dedicated on July 16, 2002.

The memorial, designed collaboratively by artist Brian Tolle, landscape architect Gail Wittwer-Laird, and architecture firm 1100 Architect, is landscaped with stones, soil, and native vegetation transported from the western coast of Ireland — with stones from every Irish county.

An authentic Irish cottage from 19th-century Carradoogan, in the parish of Attymass, County Mayo, belonged to the Slack family — and was deserted in the 1960s. The Slack family donated the cottage to the memorial in "memory of all the Slack family members of previous generations who emigrated to America and fared well there."

In August 2016 the memorial was temporarily closed for waterproofing work and was reopened in August 2017.

== Gallery ==
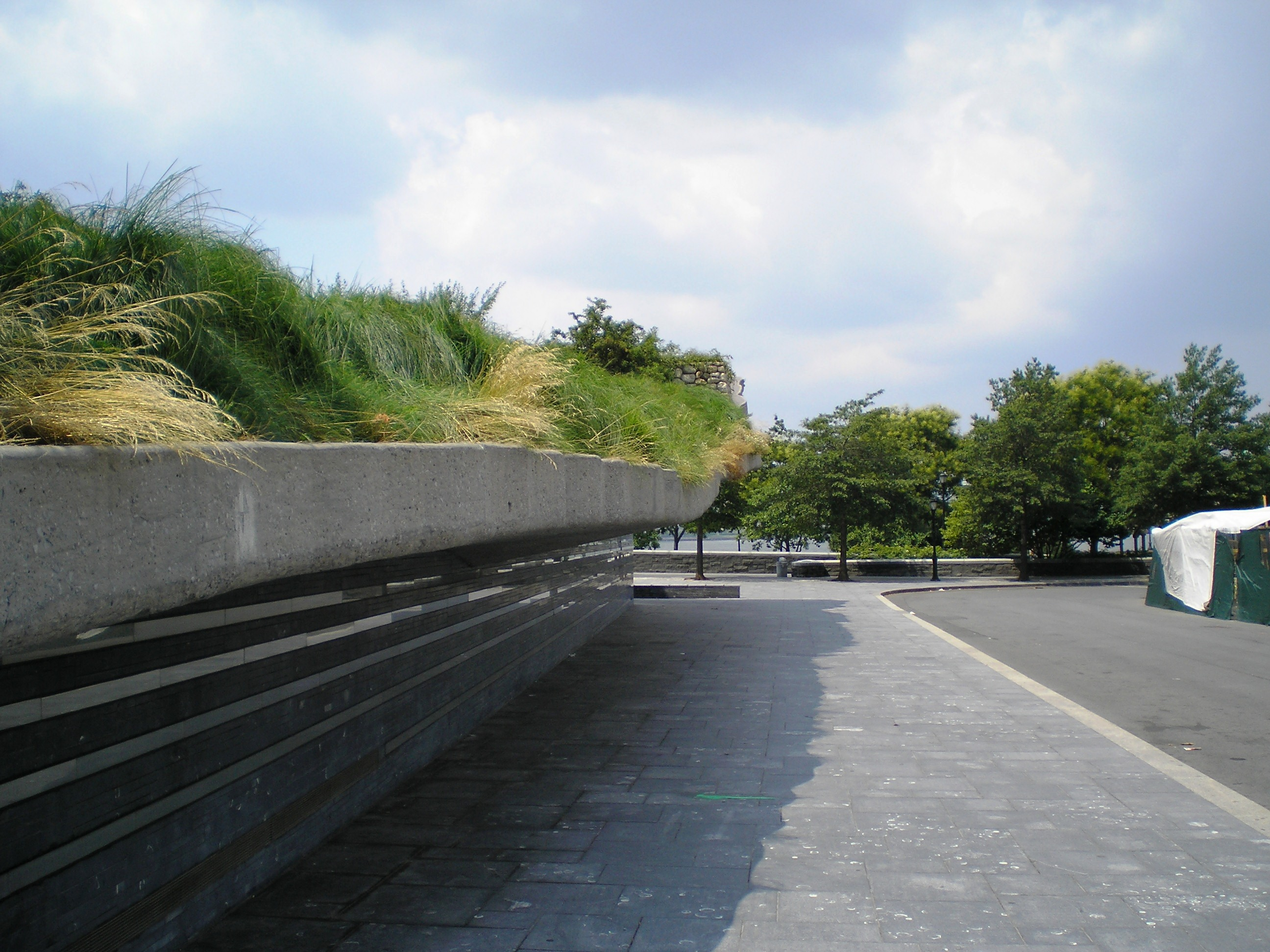
North side, showing gradual rise of the structure

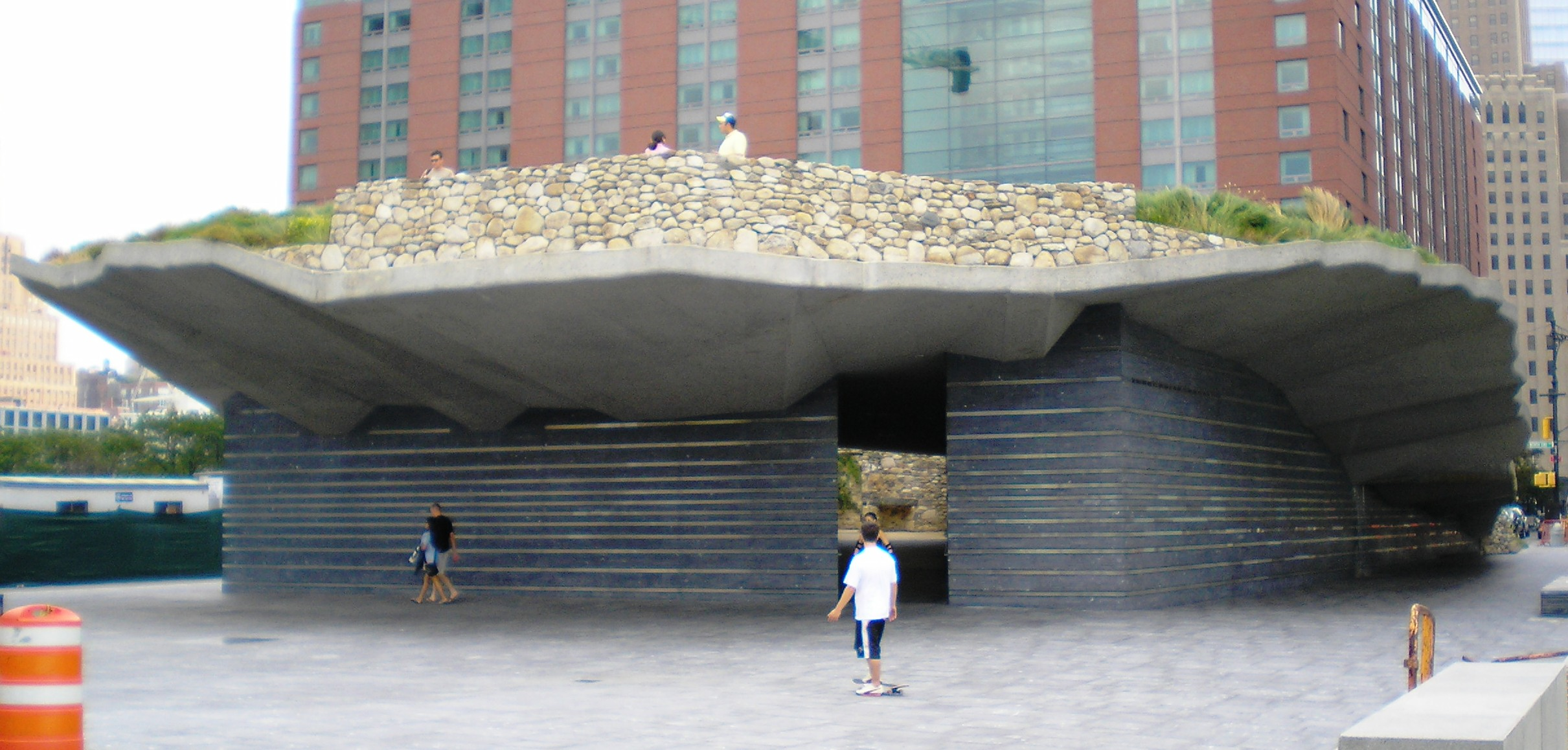
West side, showing the high end

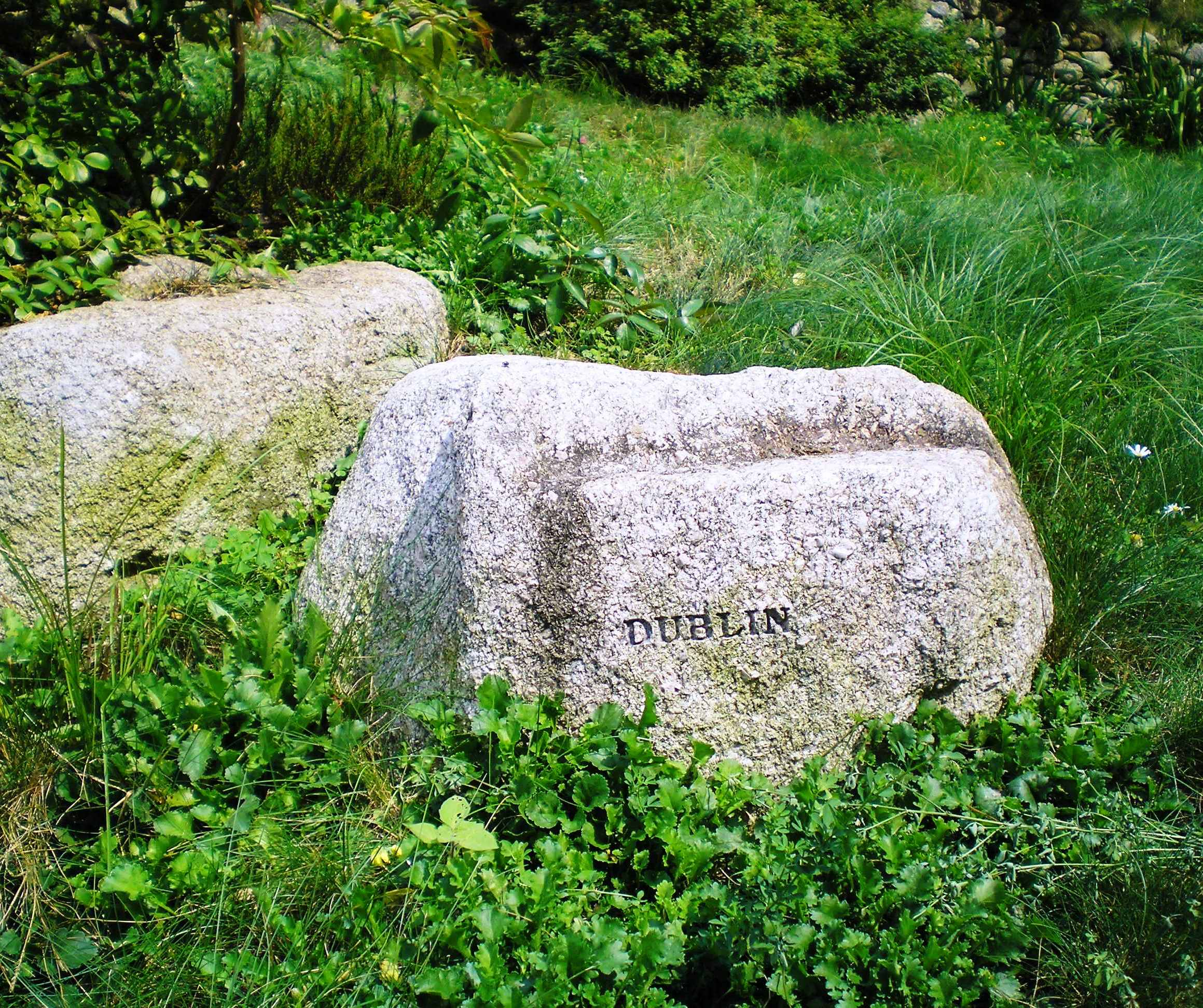
Stones placed on the roof with names of the Irish counties

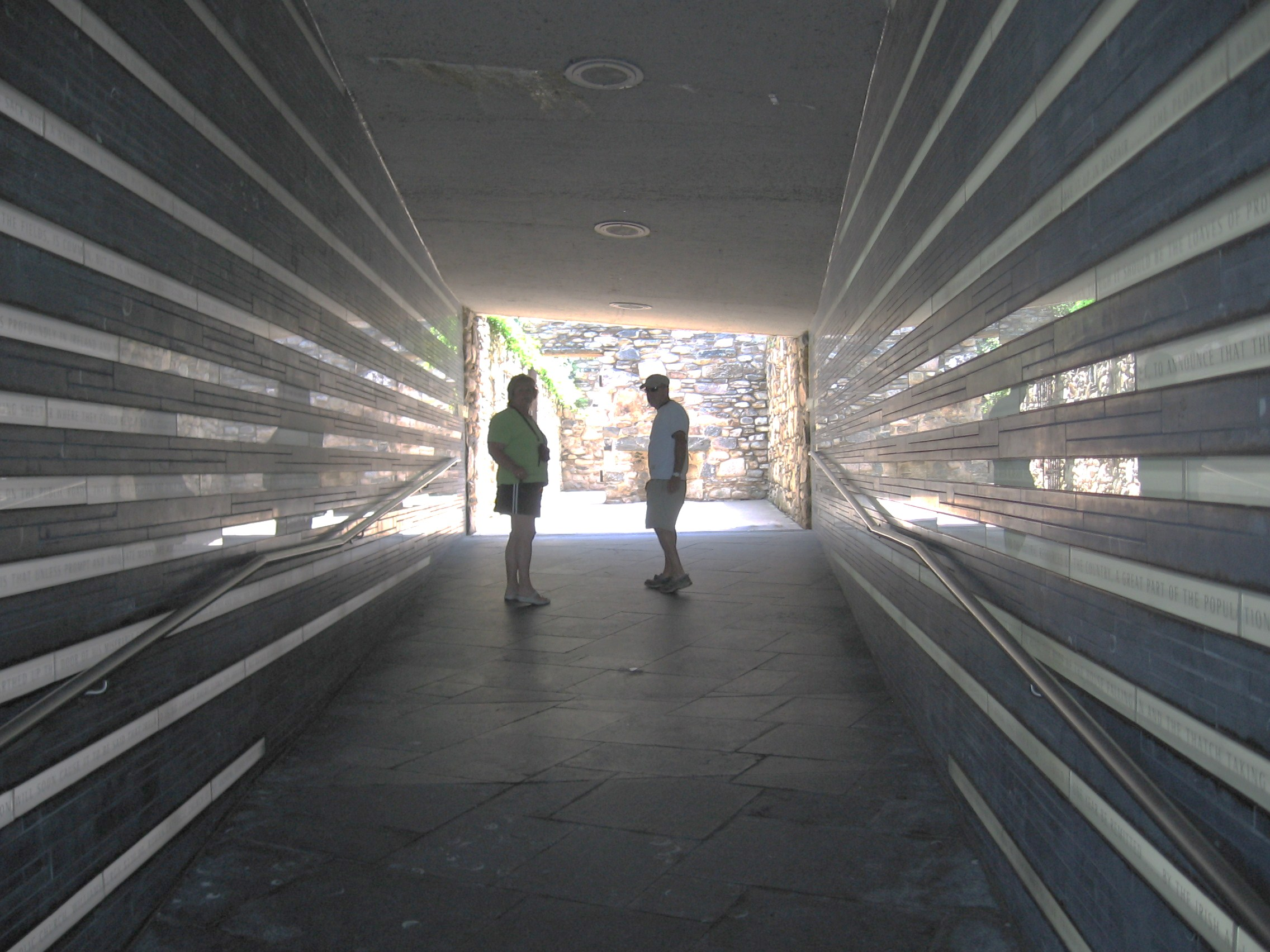
Passageway connecting the west side to the ruined stone cottage and the roof

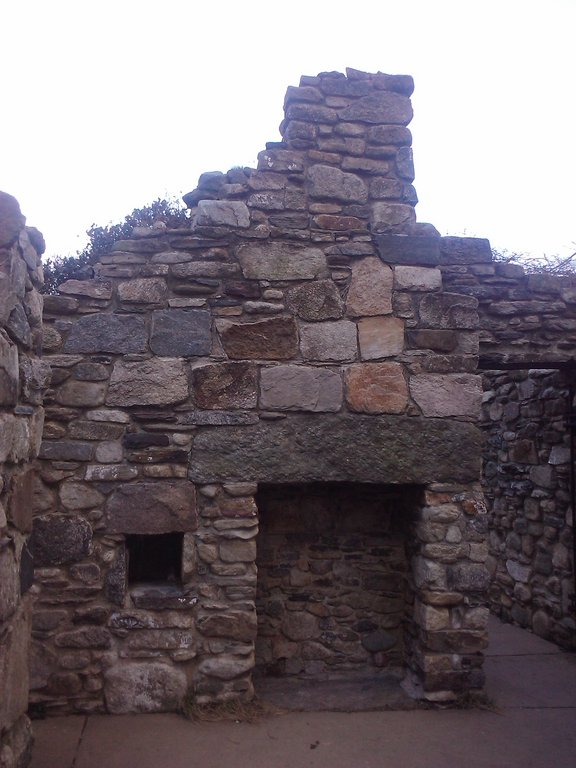
Interior of cottage ruins

== See also ==
- List of museums and cultural institutions in New York City
