= Metropolitan Fireproof Warehouse =

Structure in New York, US

Coordinates: 40.7855°N 73.9763°W

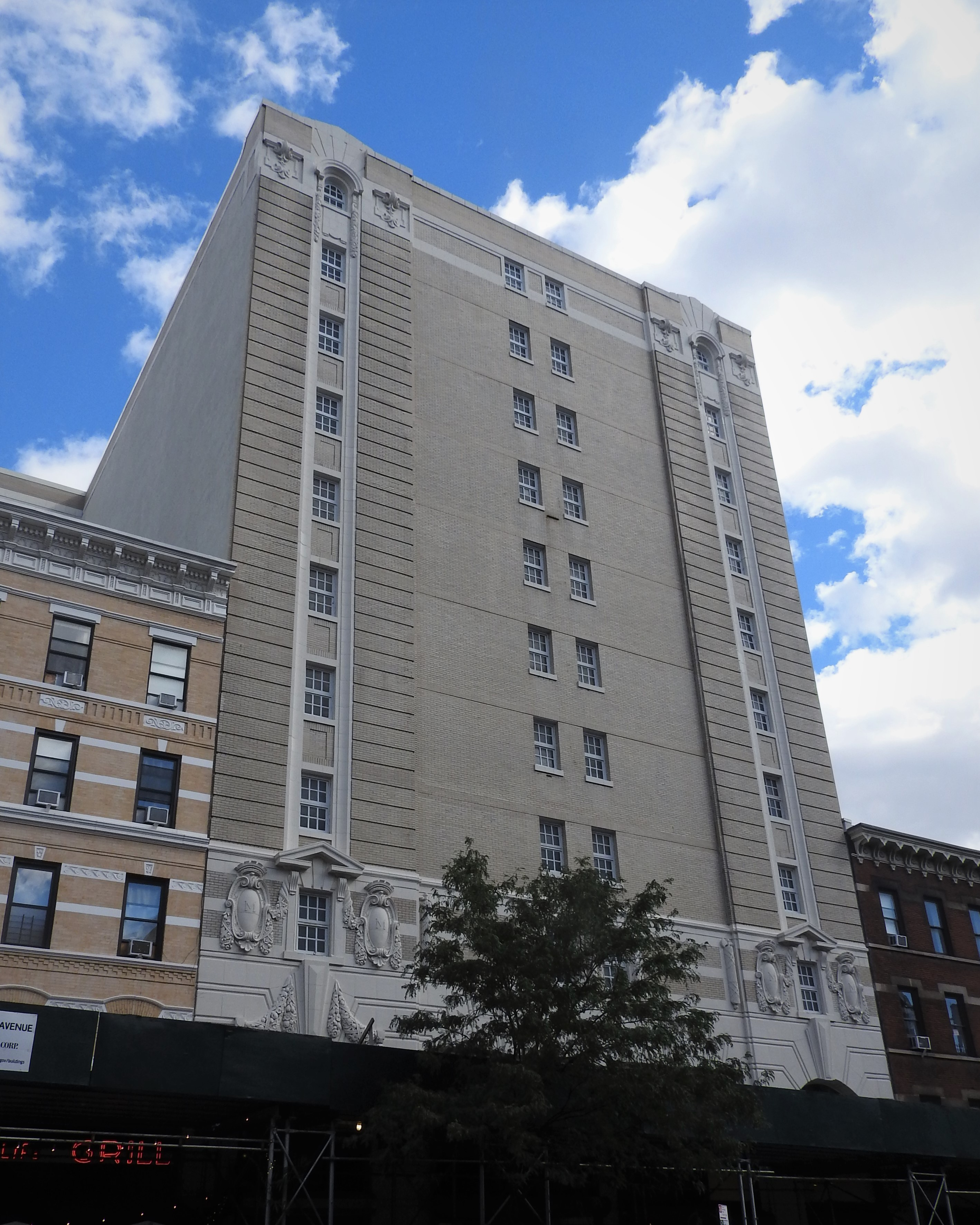
- Interactive map of the Metropolitan Fireproof Warehouse area

General information
- Location: Manhattan, New York City, 475 Amsterdam Avenue
- Opened: 1925

Metropolitan Fireproof Warehouse was an 11-story structure built on the Upper West Side of Manhattan, New York City, in 1925. It fronted seventy-four feet on Amsterdam Avenue between 82nd Avenue and 83rd Street. Continuing in its rear for one hundred feet, the edifice possessed an L fronting twenty-five feet on West 83rd Street. Aside from warehouse space, the Metropolitan Fireproof Warehouse contained exhibit, sales rooms, and other facilities.

== Business records ==
In July 1932 it was discovered that Lawrence S. Morris, secretary and general manager of the company, had diverted over $100,000 from the business. His brother, Charles S. Morris, was president of the Metropolitan Fireproof Warehouse, Inc. Charles Morris suffered a Nervous breakdown in the spring of 1929. Morris learned that his brother had borrowed $15,000 from the firm when an accountant was called in, following his illness. Lawrence Morris had forged his name on checks to carry out his theft of more than $100,000. The Morris brothers resided in the same apartment house, which was located at 666 West End Avenue.

A bankruptcy petition for $750 was filed against the business by N&H Michaelian, rug cleaners, on December 22, 1935.

== Acquired by Sofia Brothers ==
Sofia Brothers bought the building in December 1950 when it was under foreclosure by the Greenwich Savings Bank. Its property value at the time was assessed at $440,000, of which $125,000 represented land value. Arthur Eckstein, Inc., brokered the sale with the title being insured by the Title Guarantee and Trust Company. Attorneys for the seller were Karelson, Karelson, Rubin & Rosenberg. Irving Raisman was the attorney for the buyer. It became the fourth warehouse in New York City for Sofia Brothers, which was founded in 1910.

In 2020 it was an apartment building.
