= New York Evening Post Building =

Historic commercial building in New York, United States

- U.S. National Register of Historic Places
- New York State Register of Historic Places
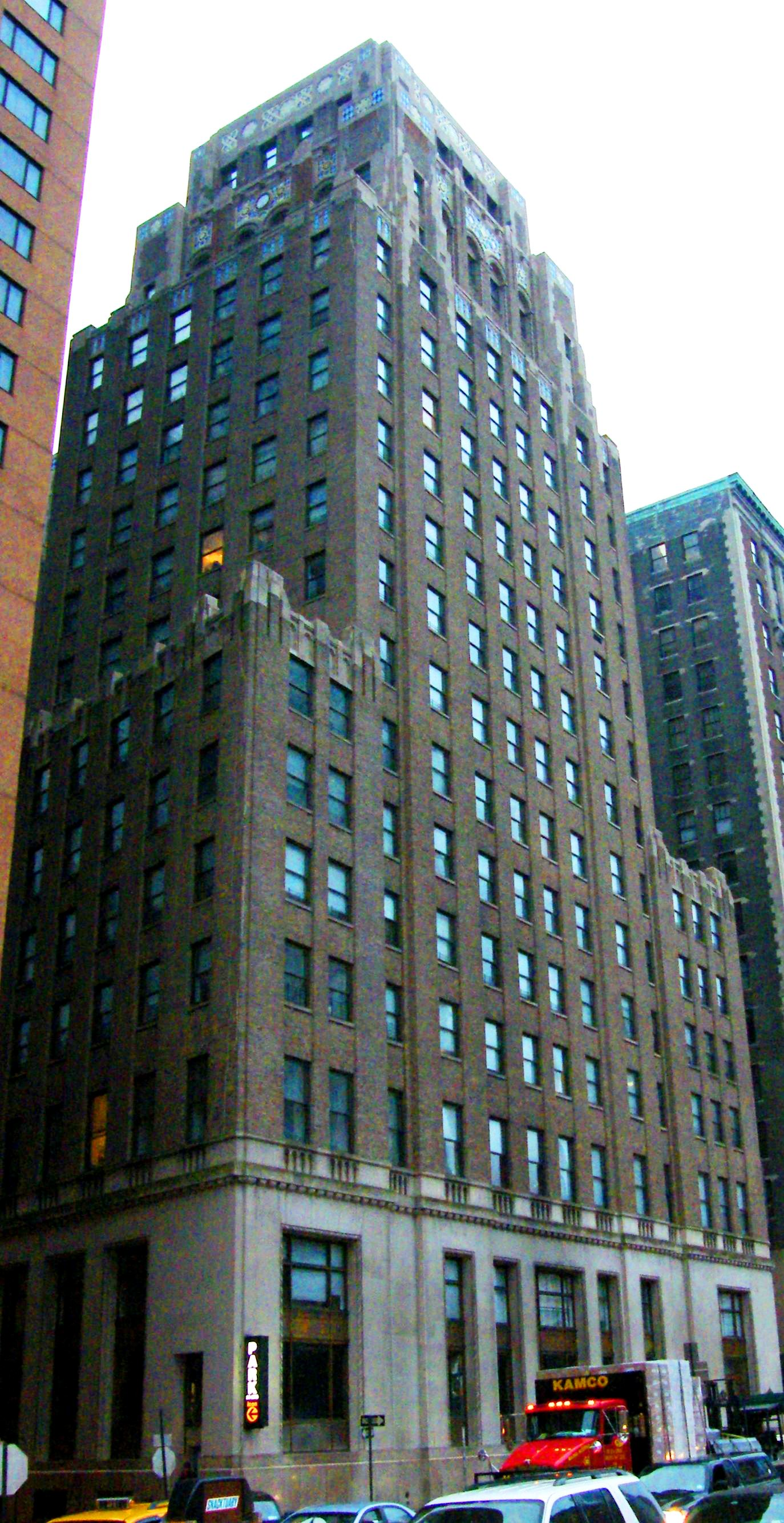
- (2009)
- Location: 75 West Street; Manhattan, New York City
- Coordinates: 40°42′32″N 74°0′54″W
- Area: less than one acre
- Built: 1926
- Architect: Horace Trumbauer
- Architectural style: Art Deco
- NRHP reference No.: 00001160
- NYSRHP No.: 06101.001322

Significant dates
- Added to NRHP: September 22, 2000
- Designated NYSRHP: July 31, 2000

The New York Evening Post Building, also known as the New York Post Building or the Post Towers, is a historic commercial building located in Lower Manhattan, New York City, New York. The building was designed by architect Horace Trumbauer and built in 1926.

The Post Building is a 17-story, Art Deco style steel frame and masonry building with abundant terra cotta and Guastavino tile embellishments. The building has setbacks beginning at the seventh floor and a U-shaped light well. The New York Evening Post previously occupied the Old New York Evening Post Building from 1906 to 1926. It occupied this building, which is now an apartment building, until 1970. The building was added to the National Register of Historic Places on September 22, 2000.

== See also ==
- National Register of Historic Places listings in Manhattan below 14th Street
