= One North End Avenue =

Office building in Manhattan, New York

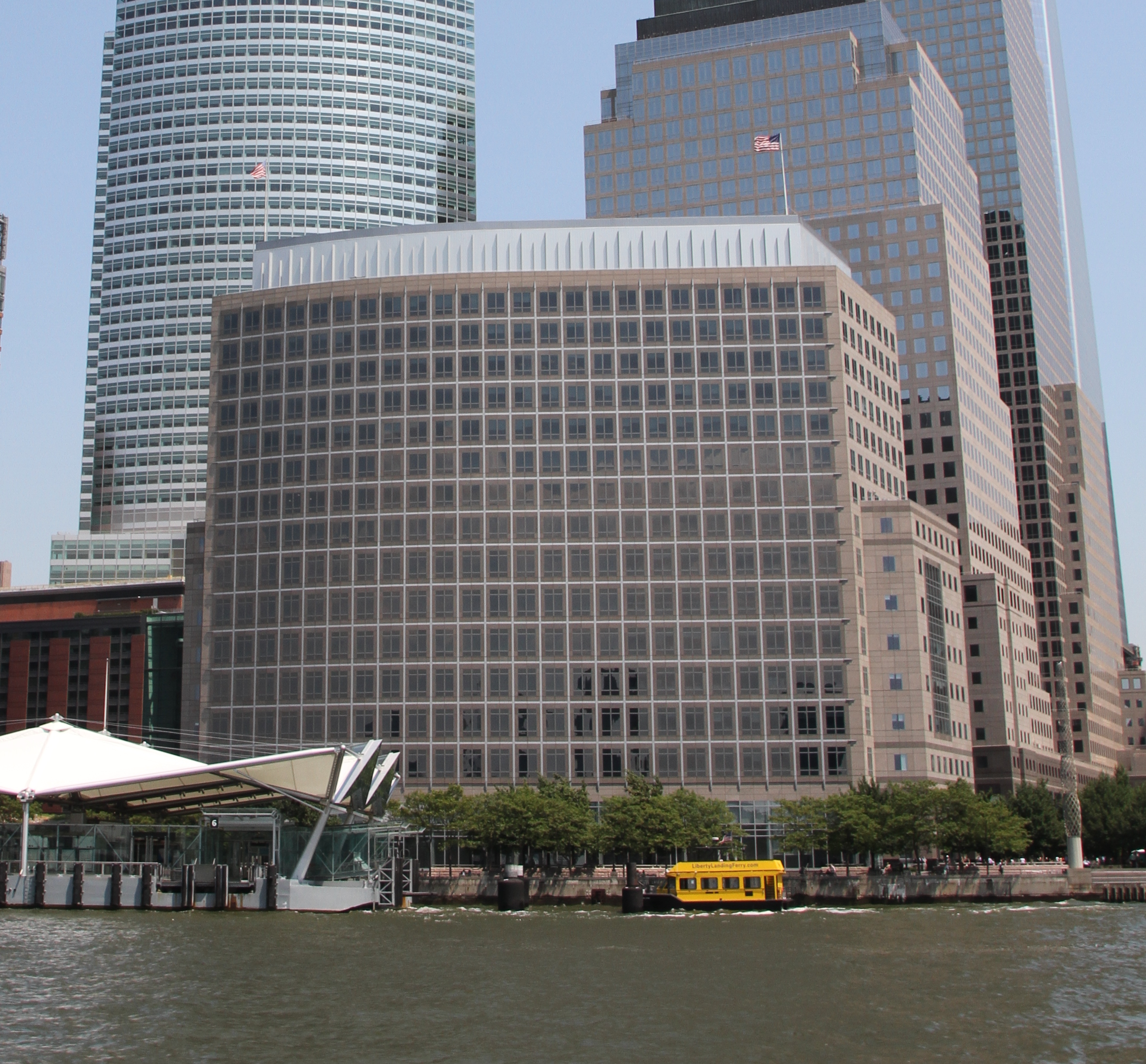
- Interactive map of the One North End Avenue area

General information
- Type: Office (New York Mercantile Exchange)
- Location: 300 Vesey Street; New York, NY 10282, United States
- Coordinates: 40°42′52″N 74°01′01″W
- Construction started: 1995
- Completed: 1997
- Inaugurated: July 7, 1997
- Owner: Brookfield Properties

Height
- Roof: 255 ft (78 m)

Technical details
- Floor count: 16
- Floor area: 500,000 sq ft (46,000 m^{2})

Design and construction
- Architect: Skidmore, Owings & Merrill

One North End Avenue, also known as the New York Mercantile Exchange Building, is an office building at the Brookfield Place (World Financial Center) complex in Lower Manhattan, New York City. It is located on the coast of Battery Park City and the Hudson River and in front of 250 Vesey Street. It serves as the headquarters and trading facility of the New York Mercantile Exchange.

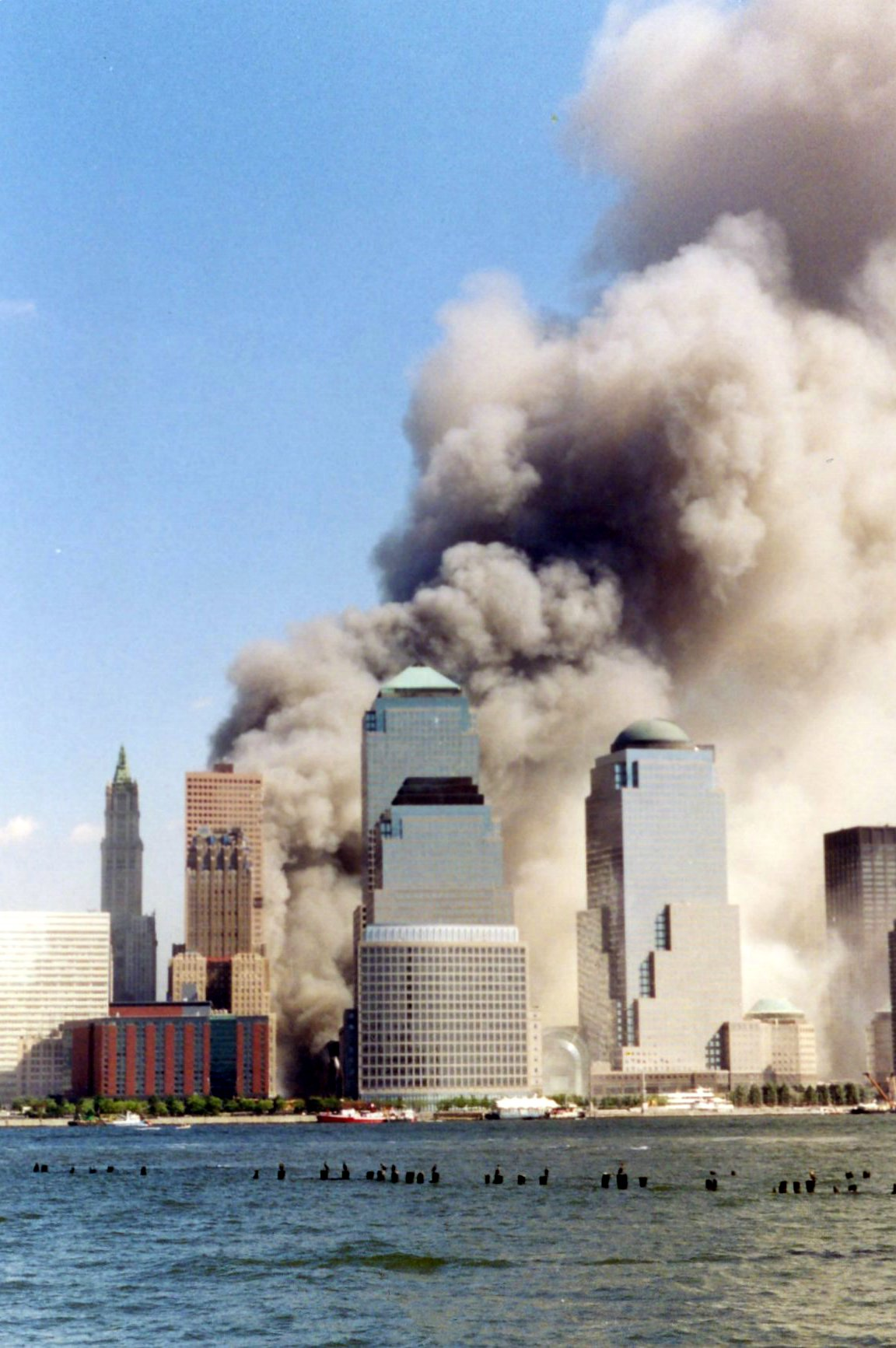
One North End Avenue immediately after the collapse of the World Trade Center

The New York Mercantile Exchange relocated from 4 World Trade Center to One North End Avenue in 1997, after the directors of the exchange had considered moving to New Jersey for several years. The building was officially inaugurated on July 7, 1997. The opening ceremony and ribbon-cutting were presided over by then-Mayor Rudy Giuliani, and the trading floors officially opened for business the next morning, on July 8, 1997.

Following the September 11 attacks in 2001, the building suffered minor damage. After 9/11, four American flags were affixed to the top corners of the building.

In 2013 Brookfield Properties purchased the building for US$200 million and merged it with the rest of the complex. As the Brookfield Place had previously been named and is still commonly referred to as the World Financial Center by some, One North End Avenue has sometimes been called Five World Financial Center.

== Gallery ==
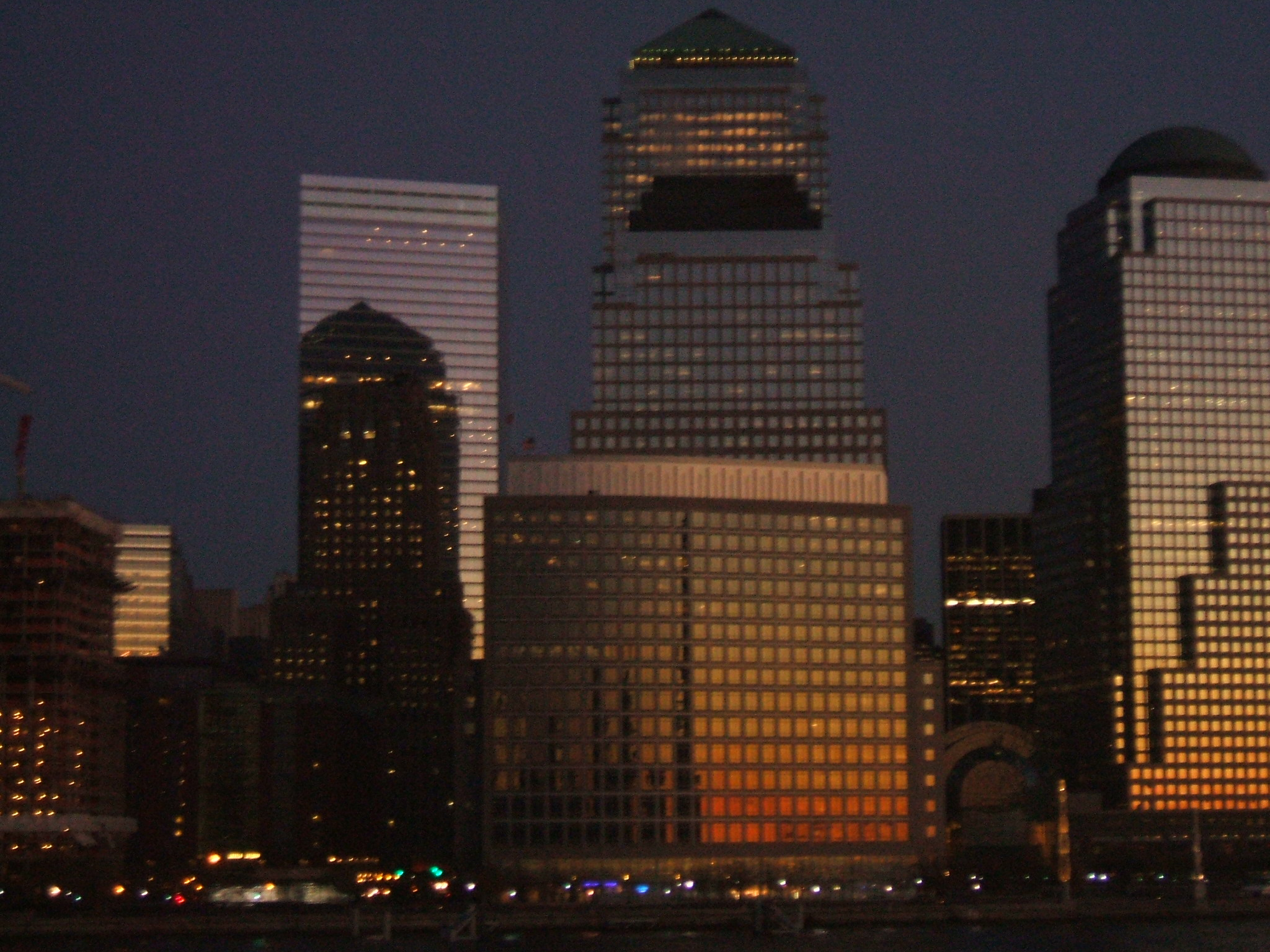
One North End Avenue at night

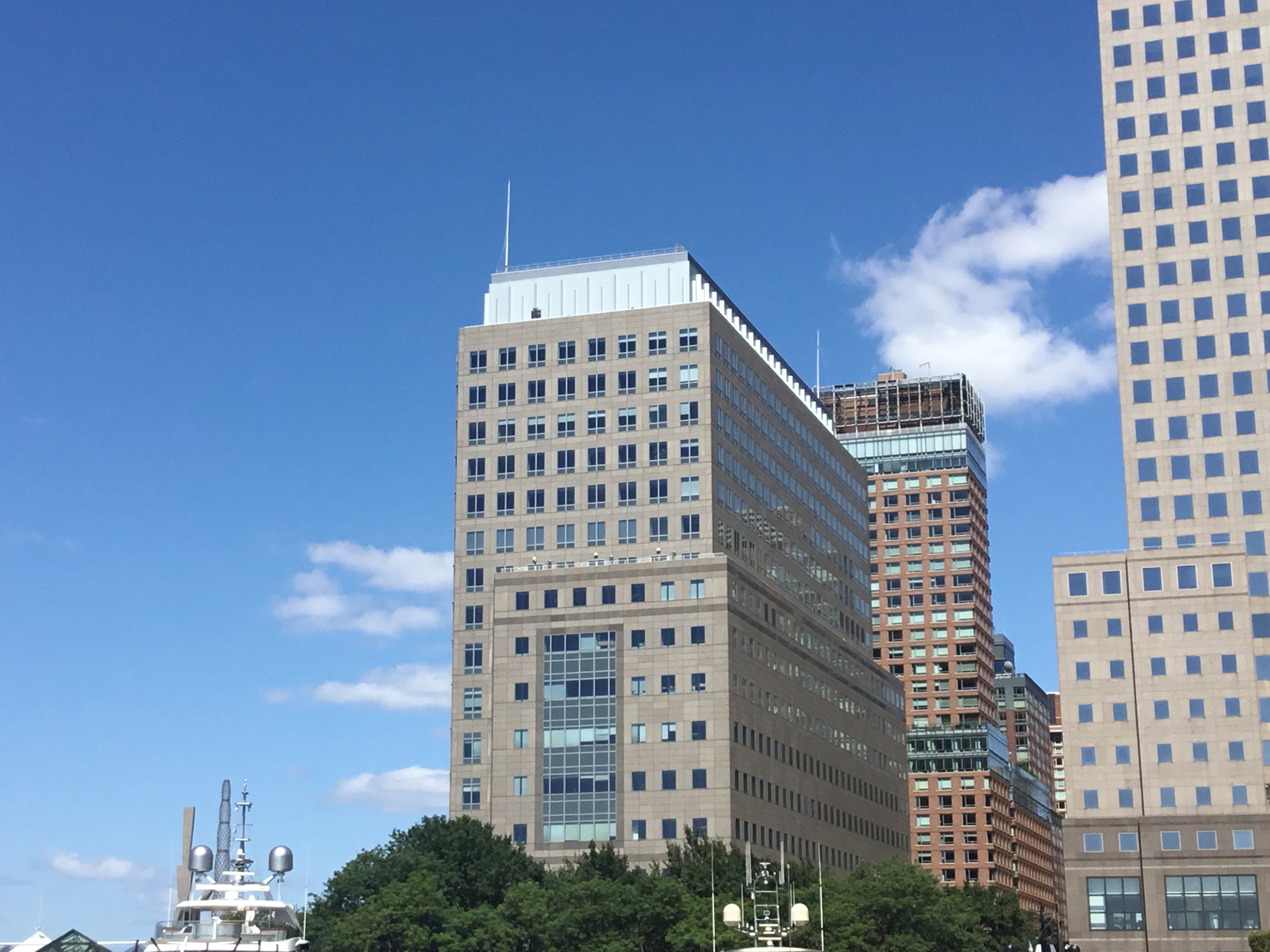
Side of One North End Avenue

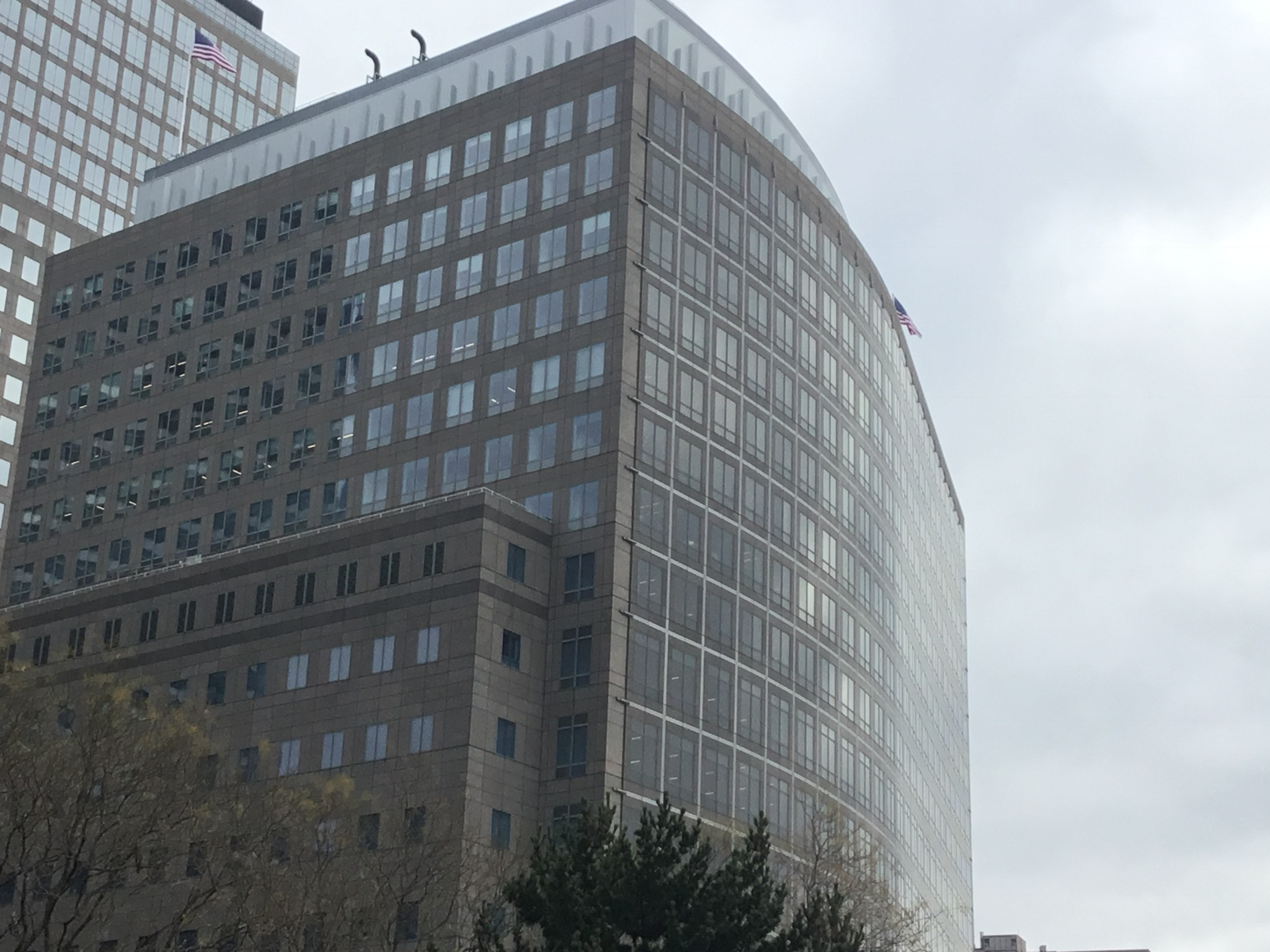
Front facade

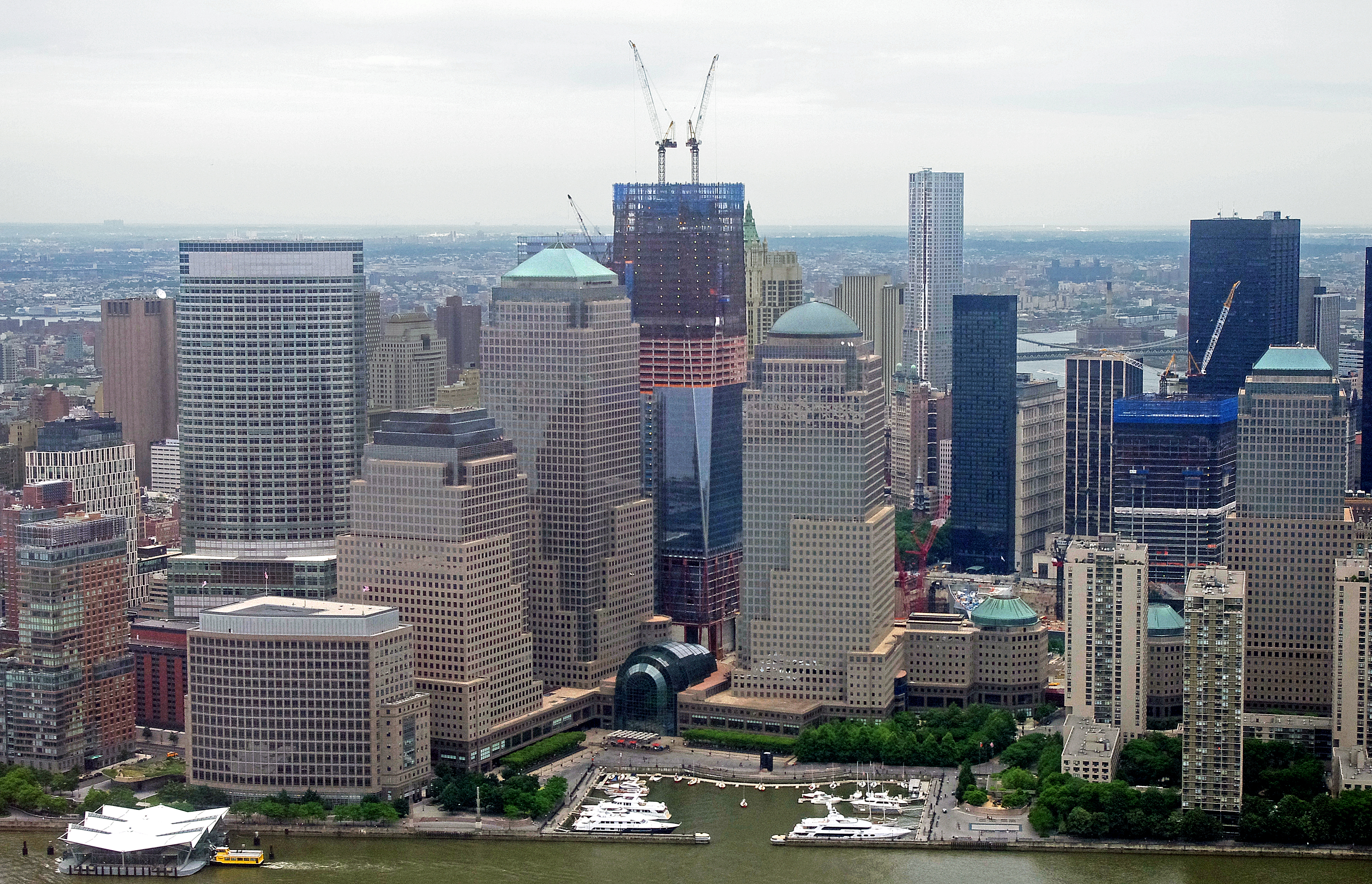
World Trade Center and Brookfield Place complexes viewed from a helicopter

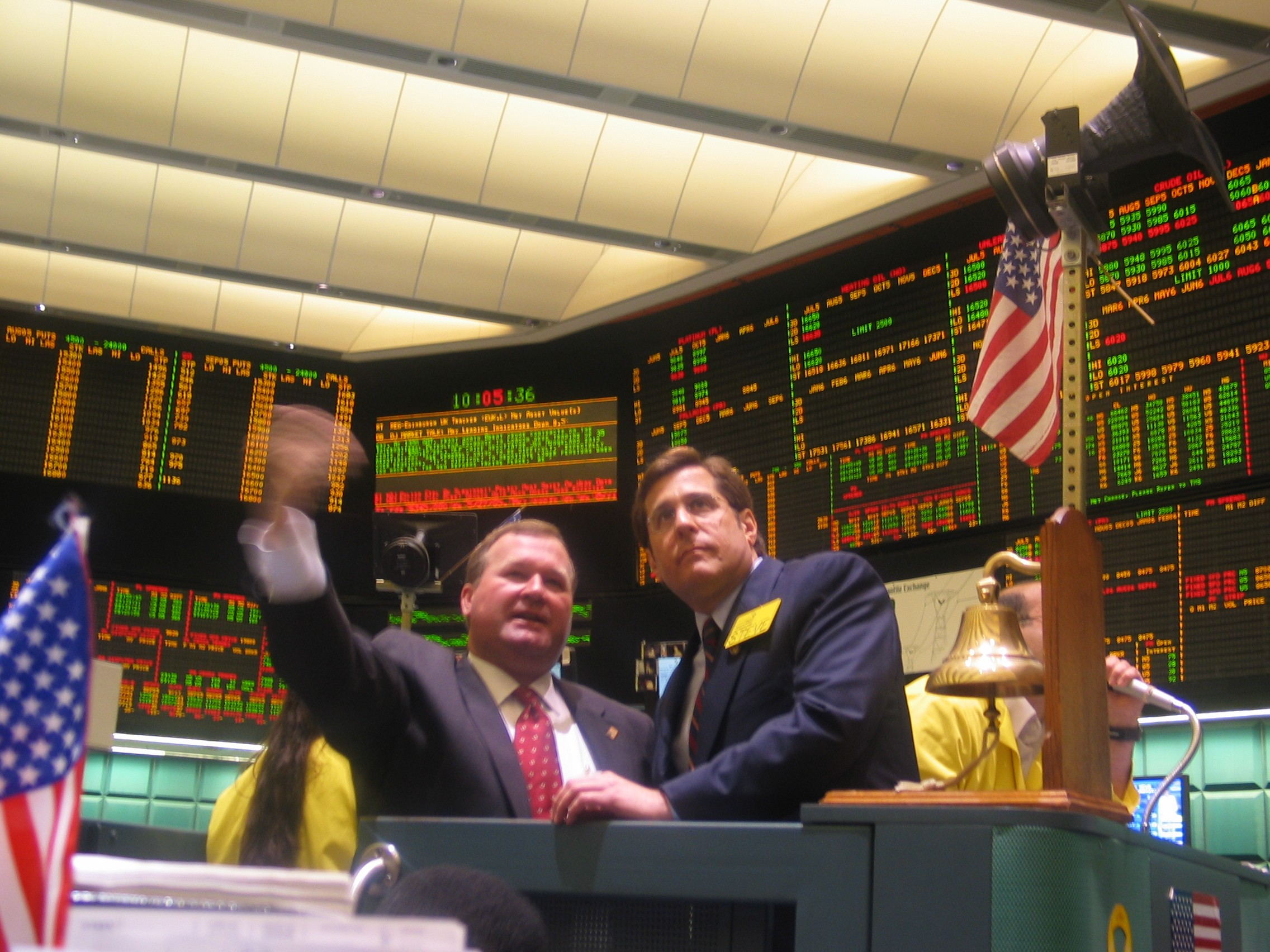
Interior during a visit by Steve Rothman

== See also ==
- World Trade Center
- Brookfield Place (New York City)
- North Cove Marina, inland harbor located adjacent to the building
