= West Street pedestrian bridges =

Bridges in Manhattan, New York

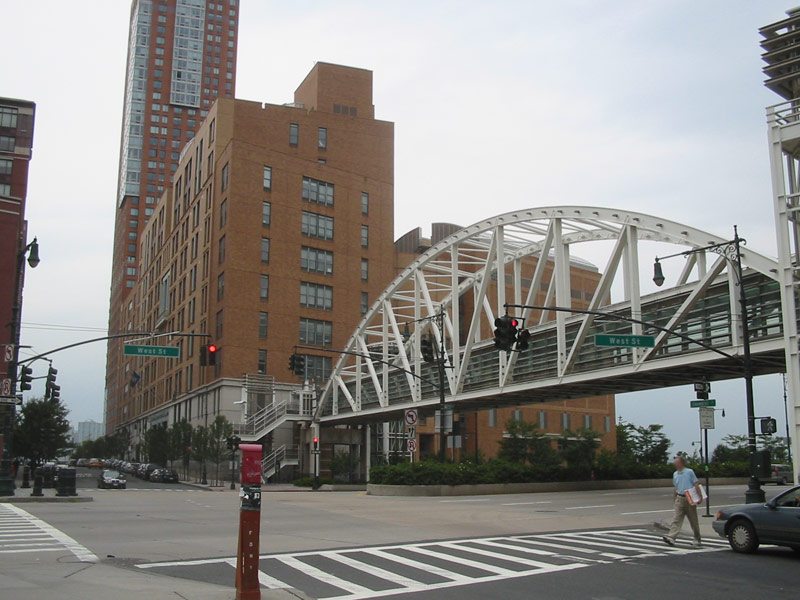
Tribeca Bridge, seen from Chambers Street

The West Street pedestrian bridges are a series of pedestrian bridges that cross West Street to connect the neighborhoods of Tribeca and the Financial District with Battery Park City in Lower Manhattan, New York City. The bridges were built to provide alternatives to crossing the busy street. Prior to the September 11 attacks, there were three bridges at Chambers Street, Vesey Street and Liberty Street. The Vesey Street and Liberty Street bridges connected the former World Trade Center complex with the World Financial Center.

The collapse of the Twin Towers destroyed the Vesey Street bridge and heavily damaged the Liberty Street bridge. To improve pedestrian flow, a temporary bridge was built at Rector Street; a permanent bridge was built at West Thames Street, one block south, in 2019, after which the Rector Street bridge was demolished. A temporary bridge at Vesey Street opened in November 2003 near the site of its predecessor, and was demolished by 2013 once a pedestrian tunnel was built under West Street. All bridges have elevators and ramps for disabled pedestrians, as per the Americans with Disabilities Act of 1990.

== Tribeca Bridge ==
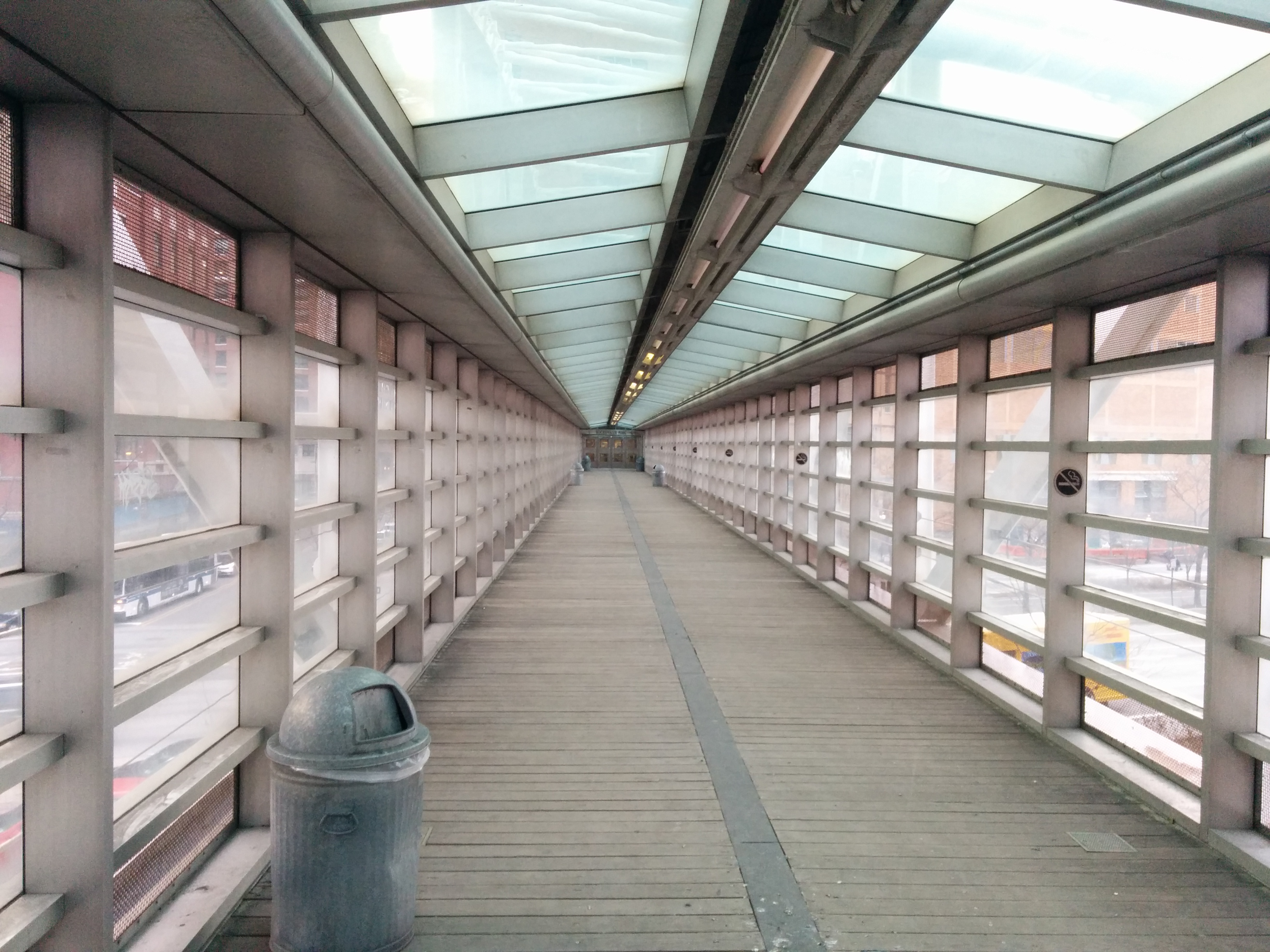
Tribeca Bridge, interior

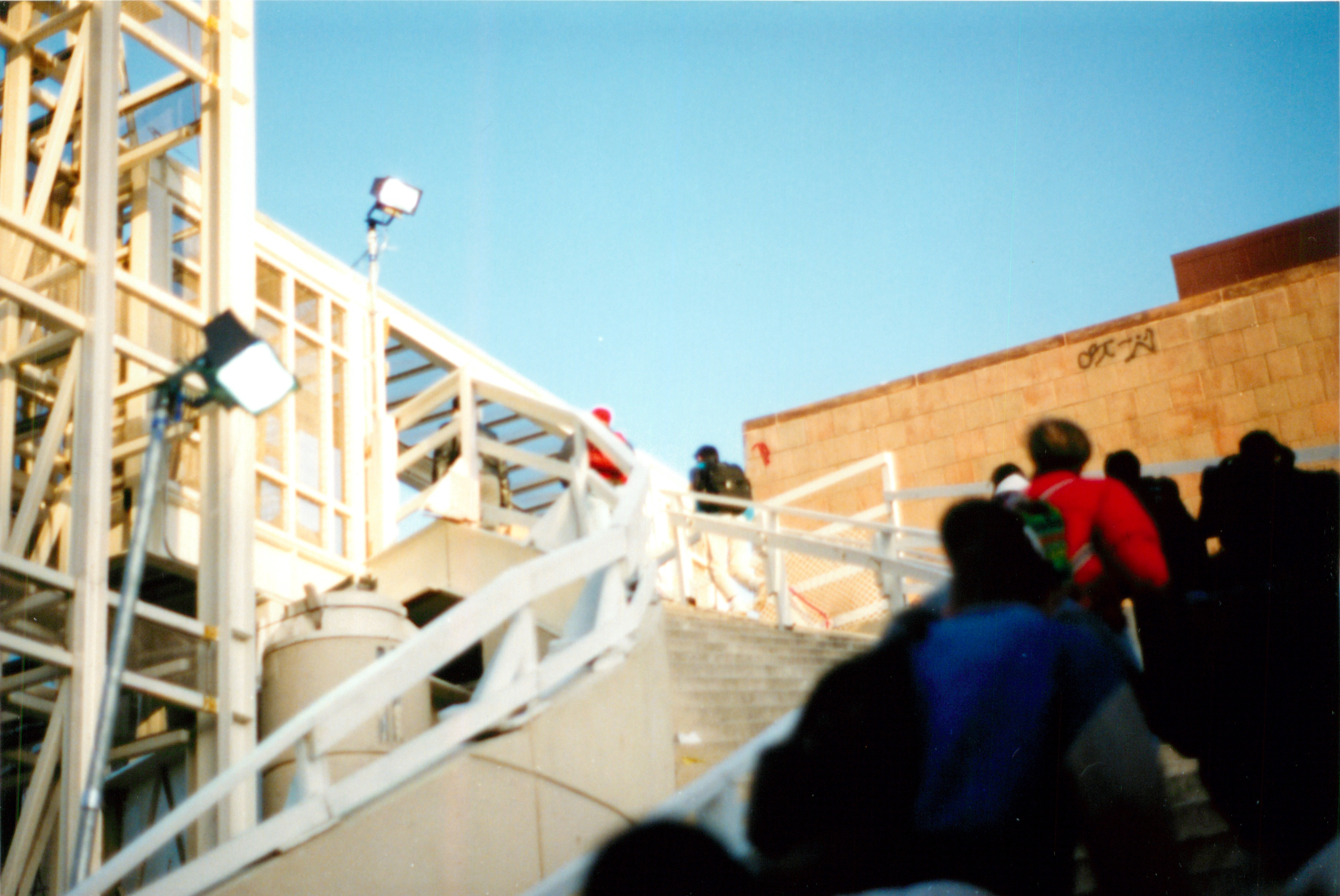
Students entering Stuyvesant High School using the bridge, soon after its opening

The Chambers Street Bridge (40°43′2.5″N 74°0′46″W) or the Tribeca Bridge, was built in 1992 to improve connections for the northern part of Battery Park City. It connects Stuyvesant High School inside Battery Park City and the property of the Borough of Manhattan Community College. Although an exit to the street level exists on the Battery Park City side, the bridge connects directly into Stuyvesant High School. Designed by Skidmore, Owings & Merrill, its lighting display at night has earned it the 1996 IES/NY Lumen Lighting Award.

== Vesey Street Bridge ==
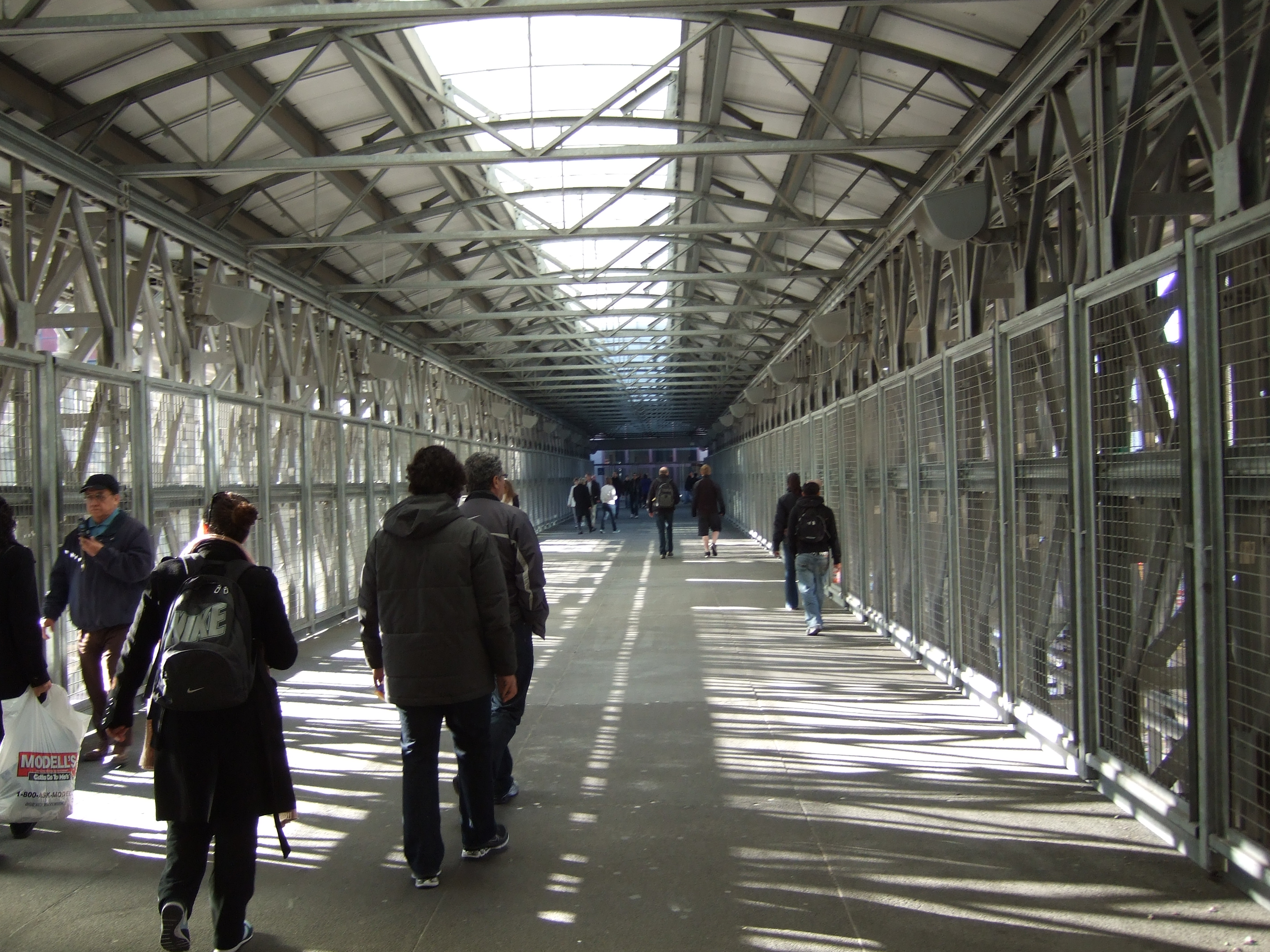
North Bridge, built 2003

The first Vesey Street Bridge (40°42′49″N 74°0′49″W), or North Bridge, connected the above-ground concourse of the former World Trade Center complex with the World Financial Center. Paralleling the nearby Vesey Street, it opened in 1984. It began at a point between 1 WTC and 6 WTC linking the upper levels of the Winter Garden Atrium. The grand marble staircase inside the Winter Garden pavilion provided access to the lower levels of the building and to the adjacent waterfront. The bridge was destroyed in the collapse of 1 WTC during the September 11 attacks in 2001.

Because the intersection of Vesey Street and West Street was closed to pedestrians due to the September 11 attacks, ground for a temporary Vesey Street Bridge was broken in August 2003 by then-Governor George E. Pataki. The bridge opened in November 2003 in time for the return of the PATH train to the temporary terminal by the WTC site and connected the southwest corner of Vesey Street and West Street, next to 3 WFC, with the northeast corner, next to 140 West Street (Verizon Building).

The Vesey Street bridge was designed with ADA accessibility in mind, and escalators were installed to allow pedestrians access the bridge without using stairs. The escalator by the World Financial Center, at the western end, opened on April 16, 2004. They were followed by the escalator on the eastern side in June 2004. The elevators at either end opened in the same summer. The elevators and escalators were prone to problems, and an escalator was closed for six months due to a failure. The bridge was met criticism for the breakdowns and also bridge closures due to construction activity at the 1 WTC construction site. Thus residents from the Battery Park City area clamored for the reopening of the Vesey Street walkways across West Street, as an alternative to the bridge. (The elevator and escalator on the east side of the Vesey Street bridge were inoperable for an extended period of time forcing individuals who are unable to climb stairs to cross at Murray Street, which is north of Vesey Street.)

The bridge was finally closed and taken apart on October 7, 2013. At the same time, the crosswalk on the north side of Vesey Street was reopened, The bridge was replaced by the West Concourse of the World Trade Center Transportation Hub, an underground passageway connecting the World Financial Center with the World Trade Center PATH station and to the Fulton Center via the Dey Street Passageway. The temporary bridge was demolished and replaced by a pedestrian crosswalk.

== Liberty Street Bridge ==
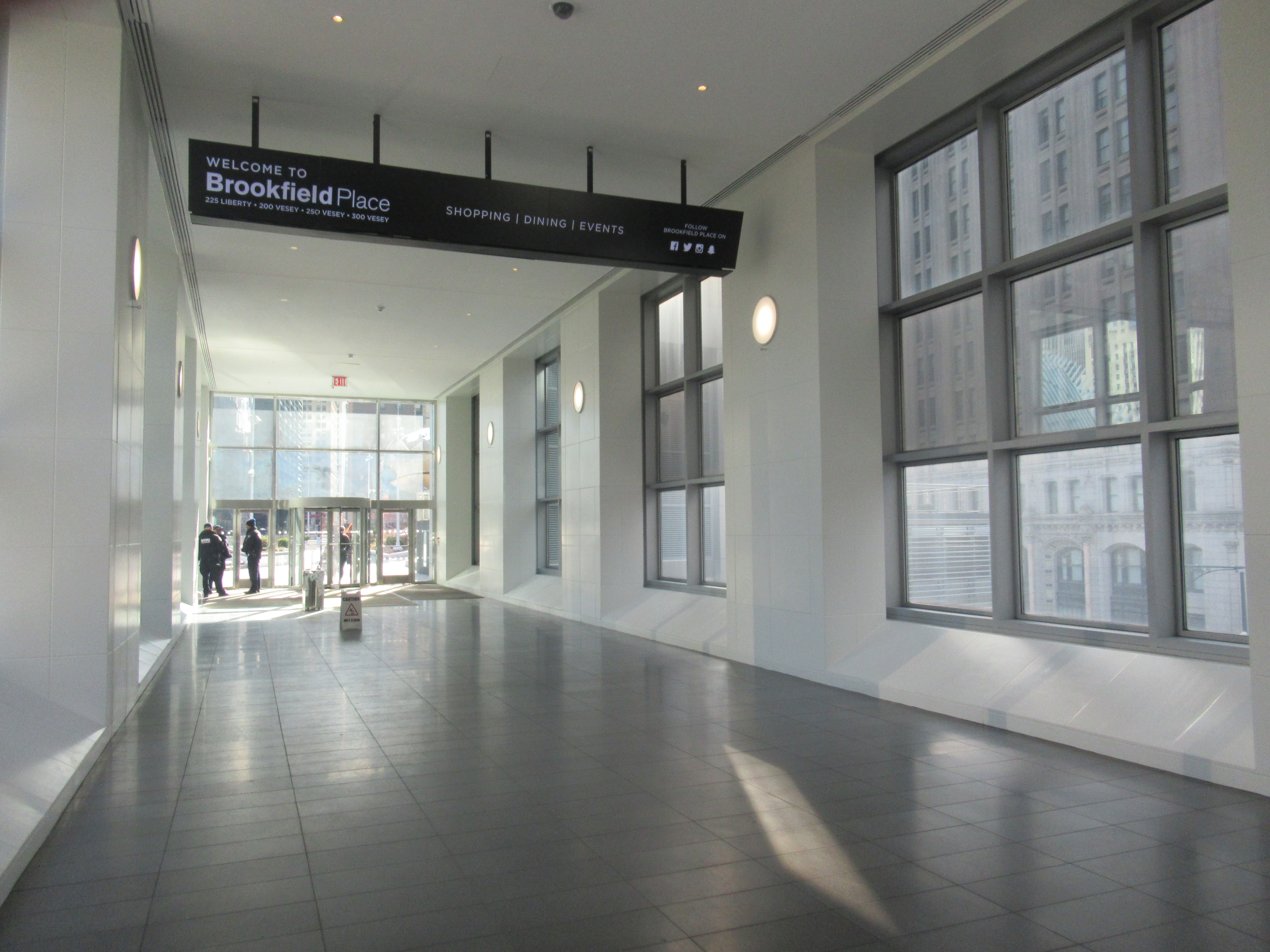
Liberty Street Bridge

The original incarnation of the Liberty Street Bridge (40°42′38″N 74°0′53″W), was called the South Bridge, as it was seen as a companion to its Vesey Street counterpart and had a similar design. Due to the attacks, it had sustained significant damage. However, unlike its counterpart, it was extended and repaired and was reopened in April 2002. Since then, the bridge has been revamped and rerouted, due to its location near the World Trade Center site and the construction activity for the Vehicle Security Center and the demolition of the Deutsche Bank Building at 130 Liberty Street. On April 21, 2010, the eastern bridge access point was shifted onto the east side of West Street, from Liberty Street. A pre-fabricated segment was attached to the existing bridge, for use while construction proceeds on both sides along Liberty Street. The new pre-fabricated southward extension was fitted with an elevator for ADA accessibility. The bridge was connected to Liberty Park at its eastern end in 2016.

== Rector Street Bridge ==
With the destruction of the North Bridge and the closure of the South Bridge due to the terrorist attacks, Battery Park City residents sought for safe passage across West Street in the immediate months following September 11, 2001. The Rector Street Bridge (40°42.45′N 74°0.915′W) was seen as a temporary solution. The bridge was designed by SHoP Architects and opened in August 2002. The bridge has a span of 230 feet (70 m), with a 170 feet (52 m) ramp on the western end of the bridge. Much of the bridge was built from pre-fabricated materials, the design of the bridge was a steel box truss system. The panels surrounding the bridge allow natural light to flow through, but it limits the view to disallow people from using it to view the World Trade Center site. In 2006, the New York State Department of Transportation released its proposal to reconstruct West Street into a promenade. The plans did not feature a permanent replacement, suggesting that the first Rector Street Bridge may be permanent. However a renovation was planned then, to keep the bridge in place for another ten years.

Billed by SHoP Architects as "Rector Street Bridge #2", this structure was in fact the renovated version of the bridge. The renovated structure had the truss system replaced by a canopy, that would allow views. However, during its immediate opening on October 9, 2009, the elevators were unusable, drawing some outrage from Battery Park City residents.

The New York City Economic Development Corporation planned for the Rector Street Bridge to be closed when the West Thames Street Bridge one block south opened. Upon the latter's completion in late 2019, residents of Battery Park City lobbied the city to keep the Rector Street Bridge open, saying that it had become a semi-permanent fixture of the neighborhood within its 17 years of operation. Despite this, in early 2020, the Rector Street Bridge was demolished.

== Robert R. Douglass Bridge ==
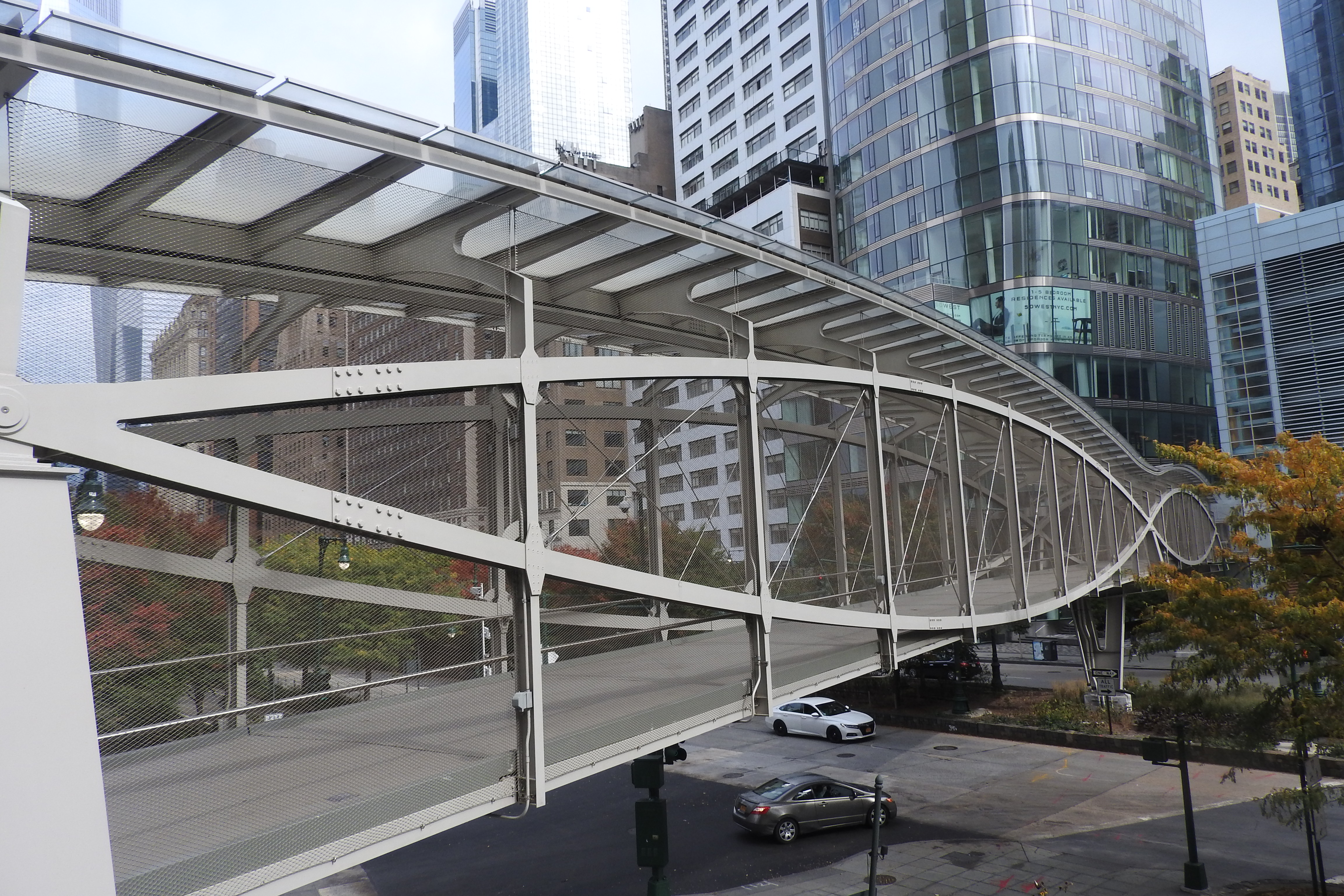
November 2020

Designs for the new, permanent West Thames Street Bridge, near the entrance of the Brooklyn–Battery Tunnel, were created in 2009 by SHoP Architects. The bridge would run diagonally between the northeast and southwest corners of West and West Thames Streets. SHoP Architects' design was later scrapped, and a newer design was created in 2013 by WXY Architecture and Weidlinger Associates. The 230-foot-long (70 m) bridge, officially the Robert R. Douglass Bridge, allows pedestrians to cross over West Street from West Thames Street in Battery Park City to Joseph P. Ward Street in the Financial District. The bridge is a two-span lenticular truss bridge designed by Thornton Tomasetti and WXY Architecture.

The West Thames Street Bridge replaced the Rector Street Bridge. Construction of the new bridge began at the end of November 2016. The construction cost of the West Thames Street Bridge has increased over time. It was estimated to be $45.1 million in September 2016, though was previously estimated in November 2015 to cost $27.5 million. Funding for the bridge includes $33 million from the Lower Manhattan Development Corporation (with funding reduced towards “New York City Parks and Open Space"), and $8.25 million from the Battery Park City Authority. Work on the West Thames Street Bridge was initially scheduled to be completed by fall 2018. However, in August 2018, it was announced that the bridge's completion was delayed due to a weld defect, and would not be completed before spring 2019. In May 2019, the first pieces of the bridge were delivered to the site and installed. It was completed by late 2019.

On June 11, 2021, the bridge was dedicated in honor of Robert R. Douglass. Douglass, who died 2016, was an early advocate for lower Manhattan as a senior advisor to Governor Nelson A. Rockefeller from 1965 to 1972 and later as a founding member and chairman of the Downtown Alliance and board member of the Lower Manhattan Development Corporation. The idea of naming the bridge in Douglass’ honor came from Charles J. Urstadt, the first chairman of the Battery Park City Authority.
