= 250 Vesey Street =

Office skyscraper in Manhattan, New York

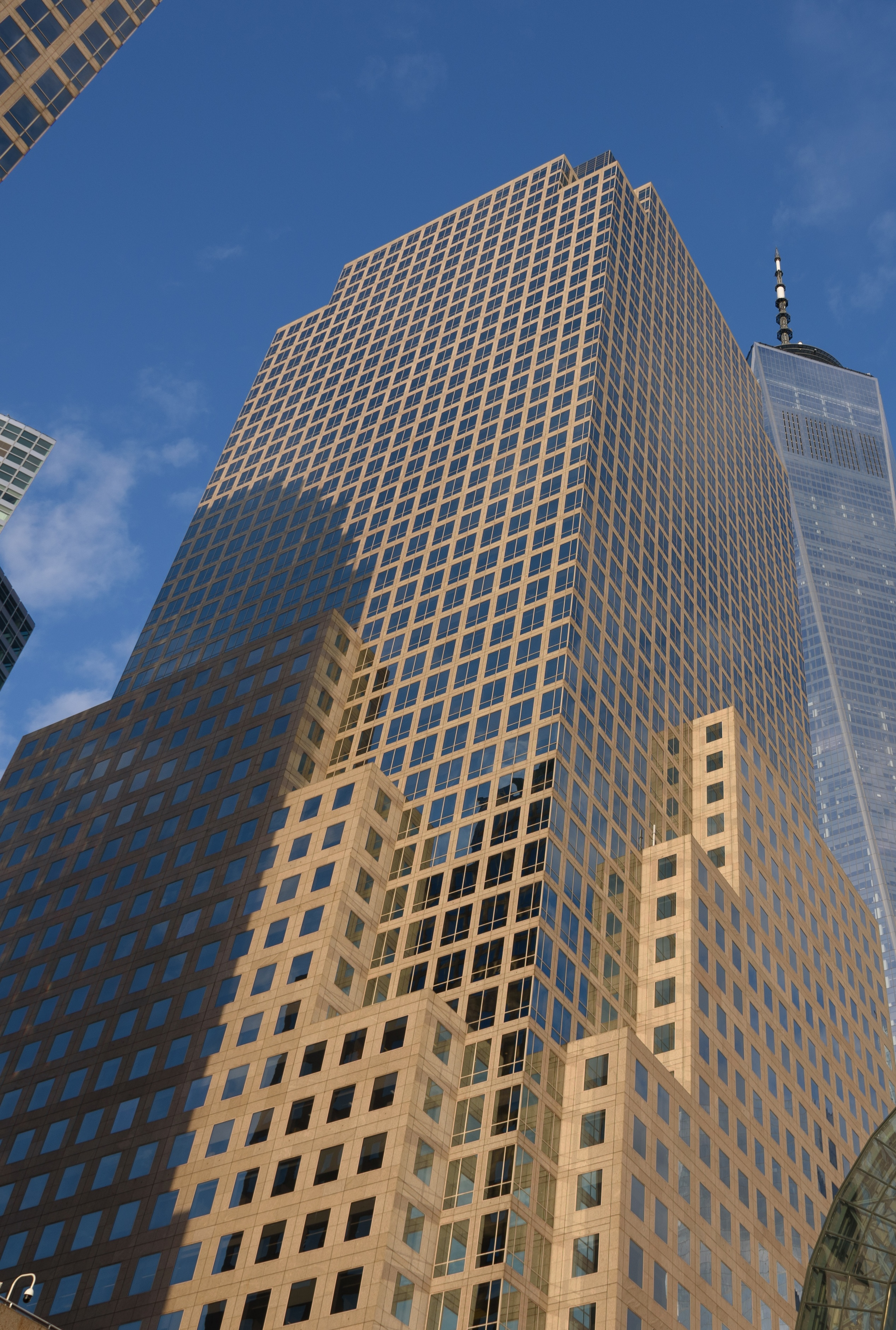
- 250 Vesey Street in 2017
- Interactive map of the 250 Vesey Street area

General information
- Type: Office
- Location: 250 Vesey Street; New York City, NY 10281, United States
- Coordinates: 40°42′51″N 74°00′58″W
- Construction started: 1984
- Completed: 1986
- Owner: Brookfield Properties

Height
- Roof: 500 ft (150 m)

Technical details
- Floor count: 34
- Floor area: 1,800,000 sq ft (170,000 m^{2})

Design and construction
- Architect: Cesar Pelli
- Structural engineer: Thornton Tomasetti

250 Vesey Street, formerly known as Four World Financial Center, is one of four towers that comprise the Brookfield Place complex in the Battery Park City, directly adjacent to the Financial District of Lower Manhattan in New York City. Rising 34 floors and 500 feet (150 m), it is situated between the Hudson River and the World Trade Center. The building opened in 1986 as part of the World Financial Center and was designed by Cesar Pelli & Associates.

After the September 11 attacks, the building sustained major damage to its roof; however, the general damage to the building was less than that to the other three towers. On October 23, 2001, about two dozen senior executives of Merrill began returning to their offices on a limited number of floors within the building, making it the first tower in the four-tower complex to be reoccupied after the attacks.

The structure was renamed 250 Vesey Street when the complex became Brookfield Place in 2014.

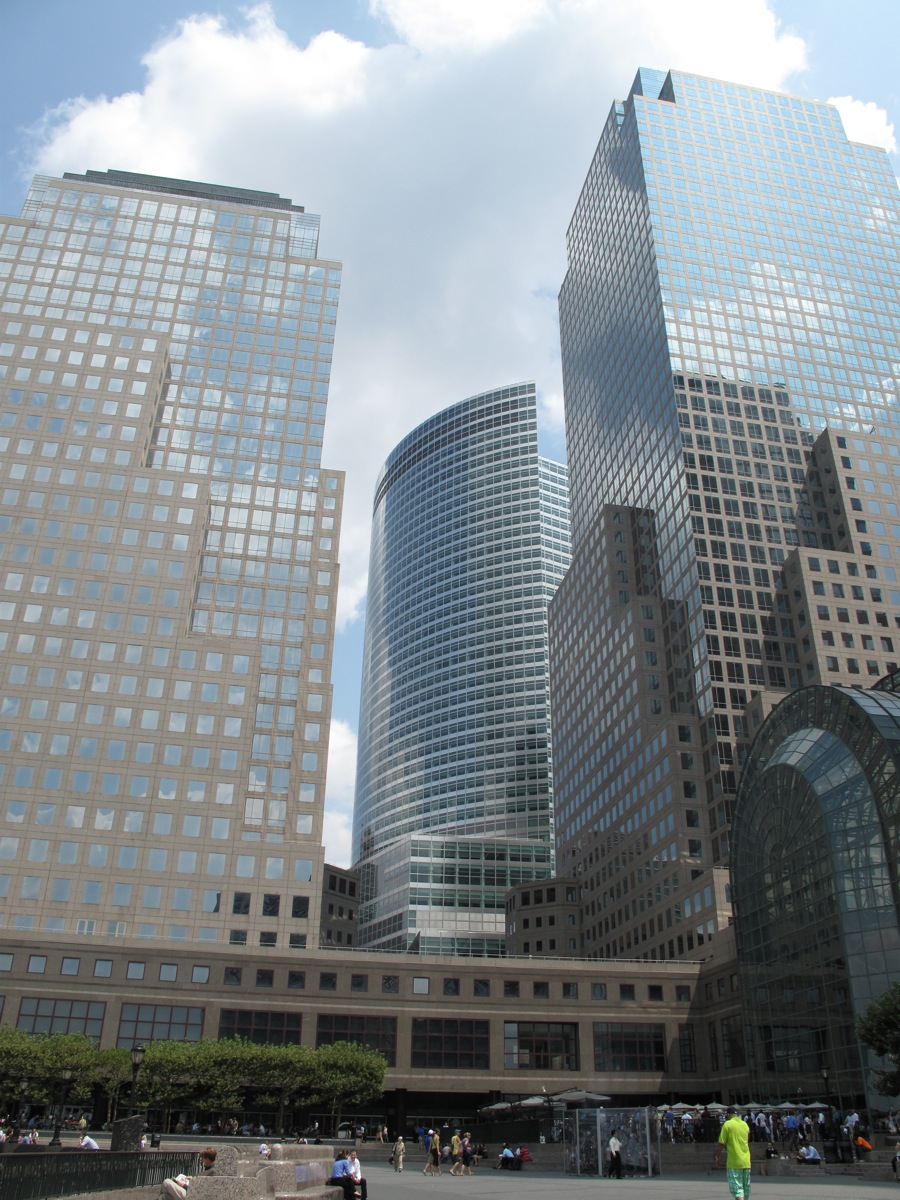
Left to right: 4 World Financial Center, 200 West Street, 3 World Financial Center

250 Vesey Street houses the financial offices of Scotiabank and Jane Street Capital. Other tenants include the headquarters of the College Board. The building was previously entirely occupied by Merrill.

== See also ==
- World Trade Center
- Brookfield Place (New York City)
- List of tallest buildings in New York City
