= Winter Garden Atrium =

Public pavilion in Manhattan, New York

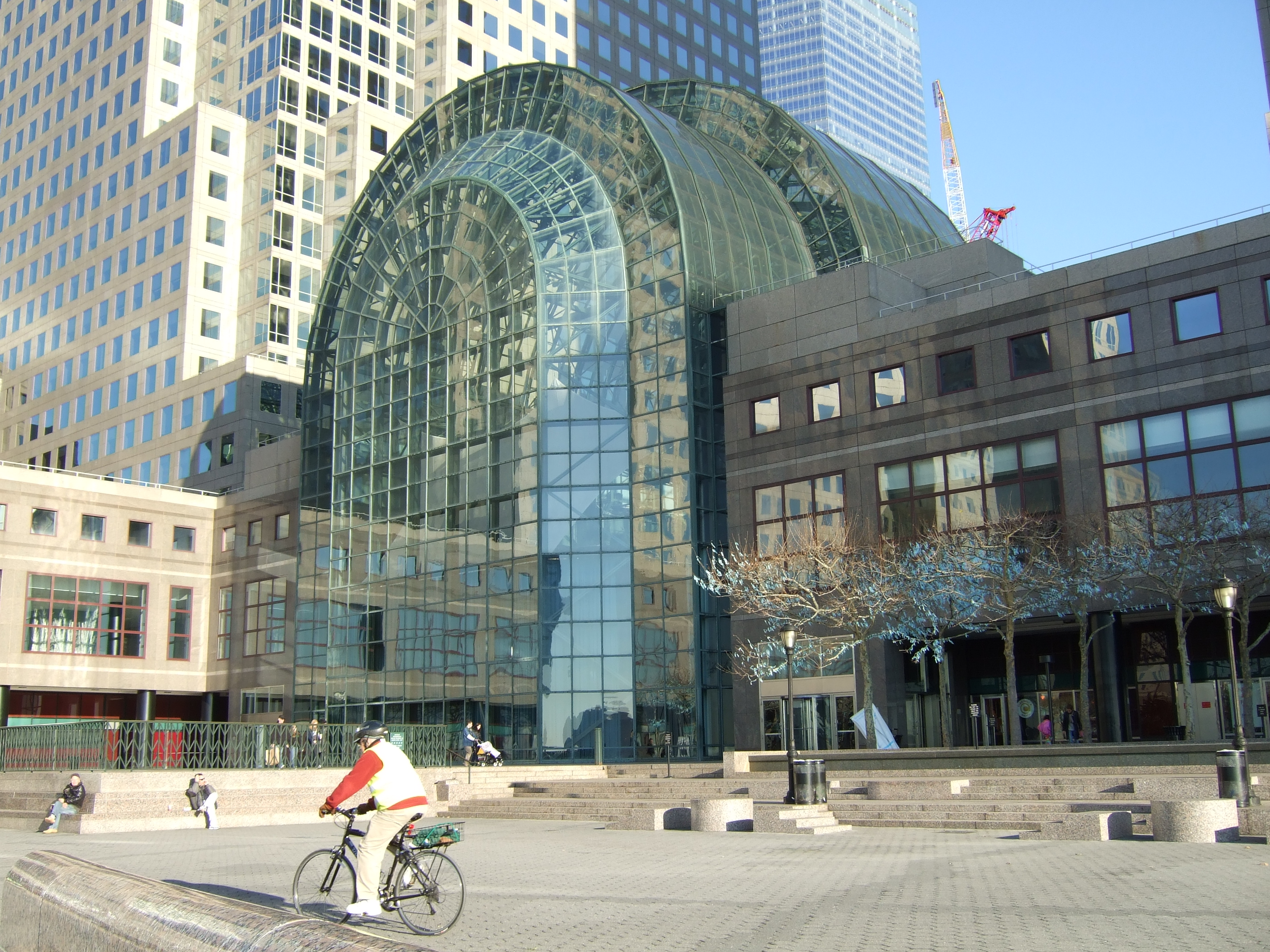
- Interactive map of the Winter Garden Atrium area

General information
- Type: Public pavilion, atrium
- Location: 230 Vesey Street; New York, NY 10281, United States
- Coordinates: 40.712687°N 74.015665°W
- Construction started: 1985
- Completed: October 14, 1988
- Owner: Brookfield Properties

Height
- Roof: 120 ft (37 m)

Technical details
- Floor count: 10
- Floor area: 295,000 sq ft (27,400 m^{2})

Design and construction
- Architect: César Pelli

The Winter Garden Atrium is a 120 ft (37 m), 10-story glass-vaulted pavilion on Vesey Street in New York City's Brookfield Place (formerly World Financial Center) office complex. Designed by Diana Balmori, the Atrium was originally constructed in 1988, and substantially rebuilt in 2002, after it was damaged by the collapse of the World Trade Center during the September 11 attacks. The Atrium houses various plants, trees, flowers, and shops. The rear of the building opens onto the World Financial Center Plaza and the North Cove Marina on the Hudson River. Over the years, the Atrium has become home to various exhibits and holiday displays.

== History ==
The Winter Garden Atrium, along with the rest of the World Financial Center, was designed by architect César Pelli in 1985. It was inaugurated on October 14, 1988, and had a total cost of $60 million. The Atrium was originally connected to the World Trade Center via a 400 ft (120 m) pedestrian bridge that spanned West Street.

It was severely damaged in the September 11 attacks as numerous glass panes were destroyed by falling debris from the collapse of the World Trade Center, but was rebuilt during the first year of the Financial Center's recovery. Reconstruction of the Winter Garden required 2,000 panes of glass, 60,000 square feet (5,400 m^{2}) of marble flooring and stairs, and sixteen 40 ft (12 m) Washingtonia robusta palm trees at a cost of $50 million. Reopened on September 17, 2002, the Winter Garden was the first major structure to be completely restored following the attacks. President George W. Bush was present at the reopening ceremony.

The pedestrian bridge was destroyed in the same attacks and was initially replaced by windows facing the former site of the World Trade Center. In 2013, the site of the former pedestrian bridge was partially replaced with a large glass atrium, primarily serving as the entrance to an underground tunnel concourse leading to the World Trade Center PATH station. Preliminary plans called for the demolition of the Grand Staircase, which was the main focal entry point to the former pedestrian bridge. The Grand Staircase has also been used as an amphitheater; thus, the plans for demolition had outraged residents, who promptly appealed for its preservation.

== Exhibits ==
Since its construction, the Winter Garden Atrium has hosted concerts and symphonies as part of the World Financial Center Series. Upon its reopening in 2002, the atrium held ballets, concerts, a performance by the Big Apple Circus, and a production of The Downtown Messiah, a modern interpretation of Handel's classical oratorio, directed by Richard Barone.

In early 2003, the Lower Manhattan Development Corporation installed an exhibit documenting the recovery process of the World Trade Center in the atrium. The exhibit included early designs of Libeskind's Freedom Tower. Later that year, the eight finalists in the competition for the new buildings had their designs unveiled and displayed in the atrium.

The Winter Garden continues to serve as a venue for art exhibits, music, and shows, as well as hosting movie screenings during the TriBeCa Film Festival.

=== Luminaries ===
In 2015, designer David Rockwell was commissioned to design a holiday display for the Winter Garden. Drawing inspiration from the festive Rockefeller Center Christmas Tree, he created the "Luminaries", an interactive installation of 650 lanterns that hang from the ceiling of the Winter Garden. At the beginning of every hour between 8 AM and 10 PM, the Luminaries displayed a special light show featuring one of the following songs: Winter Wonderland by Michael Búble, Silver Bells by Tony Bennett, Carol of the Bells by The Bird and the Bee, and Let It Snow by Pentatonix. Outside of the light show, visitors would be able to change the colors of these lanterns at the 'wishing station', which consists of three touch-sensitive cubes that control the lights. For each visitor interaction, Brookfield made a $1 donation, up to $25,000, to Outreach, an organization that helps support youth struggling with substance abuse.

=== Winter Biergarten ===
In 2018, the Winter Garden transformed into a Winter Biergarten while hosting 5 Borough Challenge: Best Brews of NYC every Thursday from February 22 to March 15. Each night, guests were able to sample brews from five breweries, one from each of the five boroughs. While tasting these samples, they could play games, listen to music, and cast a vote for their favorite brewery. Breweries featured included globally renowned ones such as Brooklyn Brewery and less-known ones such as Kills Boro Brewing Company. The event was held in partnership with New Yorkers for Parks, a non-profit organization dedicated to building and protecting open spaces throughout New York City. A total of $46,000 was raised from the beer sales by the end of the multi-week event, and 100% of these proceeds went to New Yorkers for Parks.

=== A Dozen Dreams ===
In 2021, the Winter Garden was home to "A Dozen Dreams", an immersive art installation commissioned by En Garde Arts. They asked 12 female playwrights to describe their dreams during the pandemic. Artistic director Anne Hamburger, along with former director John Clinton Eisner and designer Irina Kruzhilina, then brought these descriptions to life in twelve separate rooms. At the entrance of the installation, visitors were given headphones to listen to recorded audio descriptions of the dreams written and performed by the playwrights themselves. Each of these recordings was 3 minutes and 30 seconds long, and visitors were allowed to move at their own pace. In December 2021, the exhibit was featured in New York Times' "Best Theater of 2021".

== Gallery ==
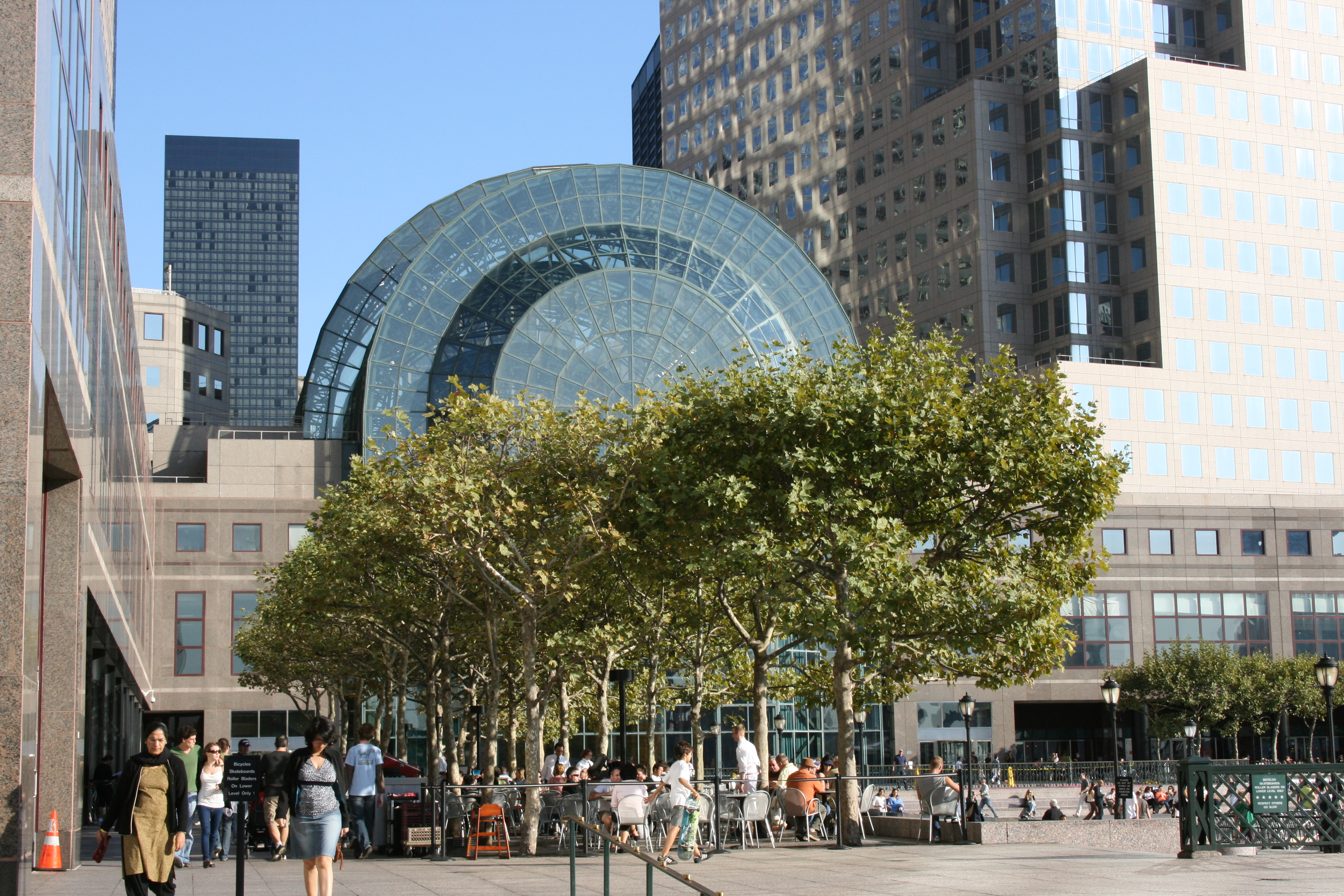
Exterior of the Winter Garden Atrium from the riverside in 2008

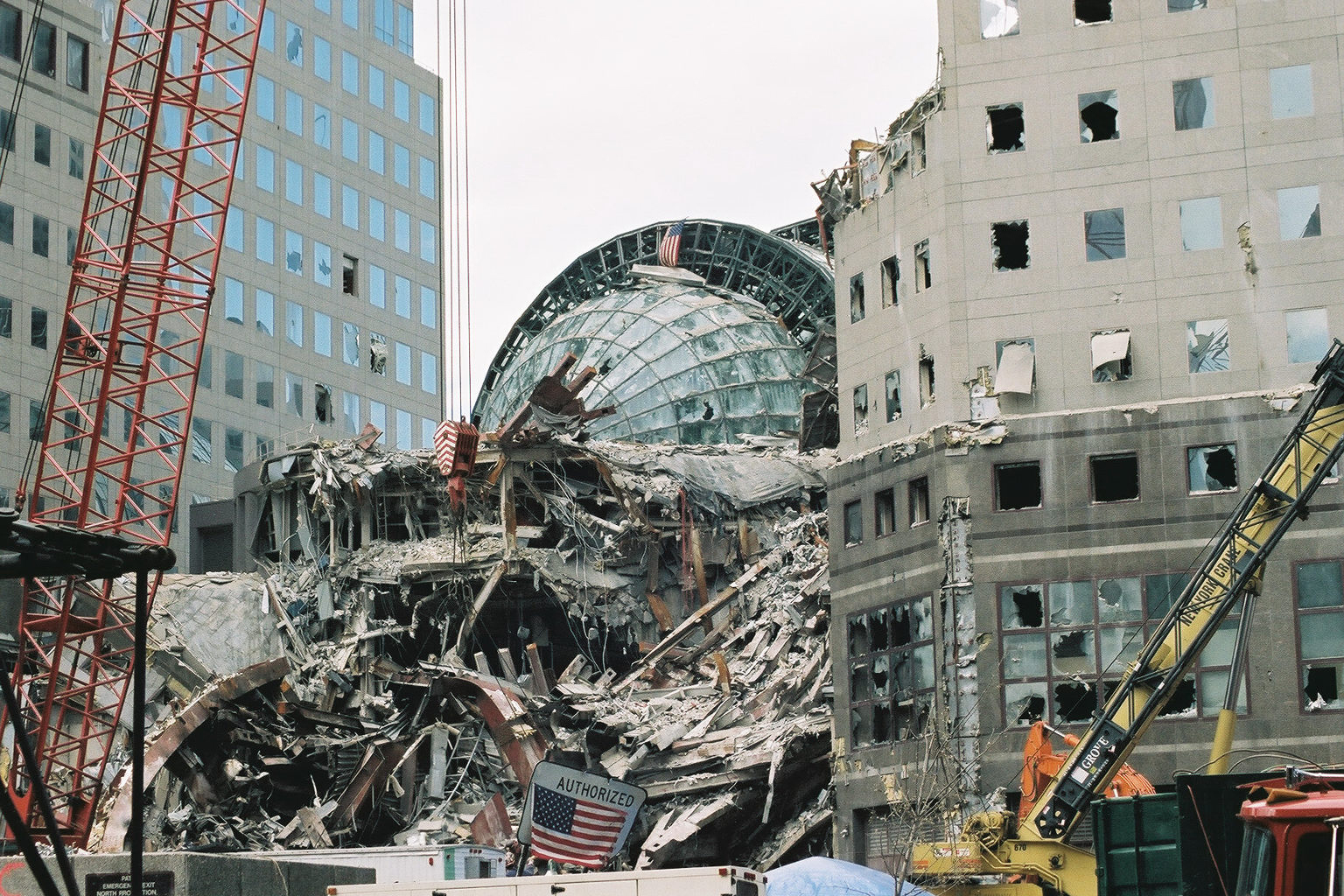
The damaged Winter Garden after the 9/11 attacks

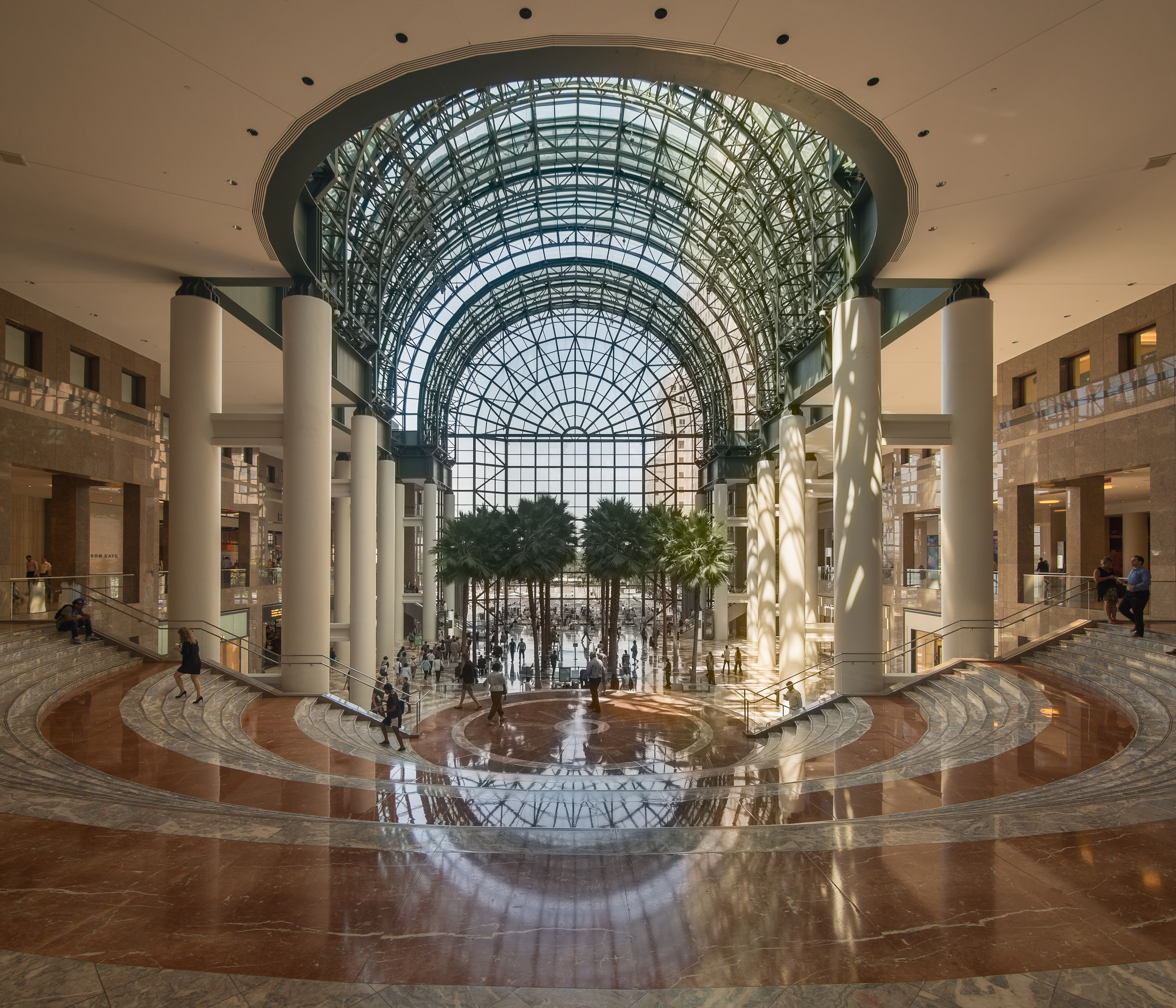
Interior of the Winter Garden Atrium in 2017

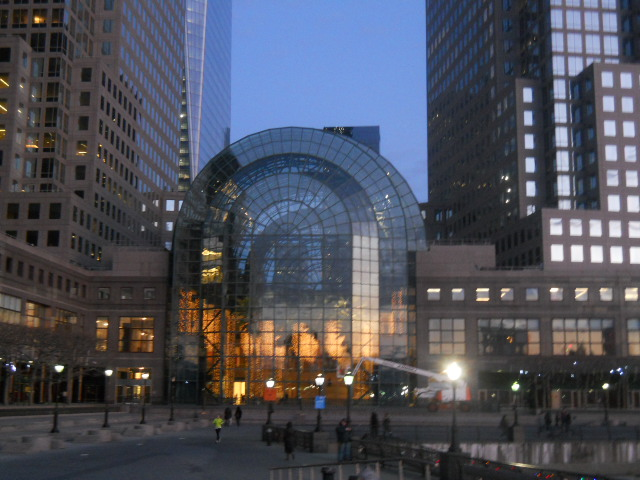
Winter Garden at night in 2012

== See also ==
- World Trade Center
- Brookfield Place (New York City)
- North Cove Marina, inland harbor located adjacent to the building
