= Brookfield Place (New York City) =

Development in Manhattan, New York

- Brookfield Place, then the World Financial Center, in 2014 during reconstruction of the World Trade Center
- Former names: World Financial Center (1985–2014)

General information
- Location: New York City, New York, United States
- Coordinates: 40°42′47″N 74°00′56″W
- Opened: 1985; 41 years ago
- Owner: BGRE
- Operator: BGRE

Design and construction
- Architect: César Pelli
- Architecture firm: Adamson Associates, Skidmore, Owings & Merrill
- Developer: Olympia and York

Other information
- Parking: Self-park and valet garages
- Public transit: New York City Subway: at WTC Cortlandt; at Park Place; at Chambers Street; at World Trade Center; at Cortlandt Street; PATH: NWK-WTC HOB-WTC at World Trade Center

Website
- bfplny.com

Brookfield Place
- Location: New York City
- Address: 230 Vesey Street
- Opened: March 26, 2015
- Architect: Cesar Pelli
- Num. of stores: 60+
- Floor area: 375,000 square feet (34,800 m^{2})
- Floors: 2
- Public transit: New York City Subway
- Website: www.bfplny.com

Brookfield Place (previously named and still commonly referred to as the World Financial Center) is a shopping center and office building complex in the New York City borough of Manhattan. It is located in the Battery Park City neighborhood, across West Street from the World Trade Center, and overlooks the Hudson River. The complex is currently owned and managed by BGRE, formerly Brookfield Properties, a subsidiary of Brookfield Corporation.

== History ==
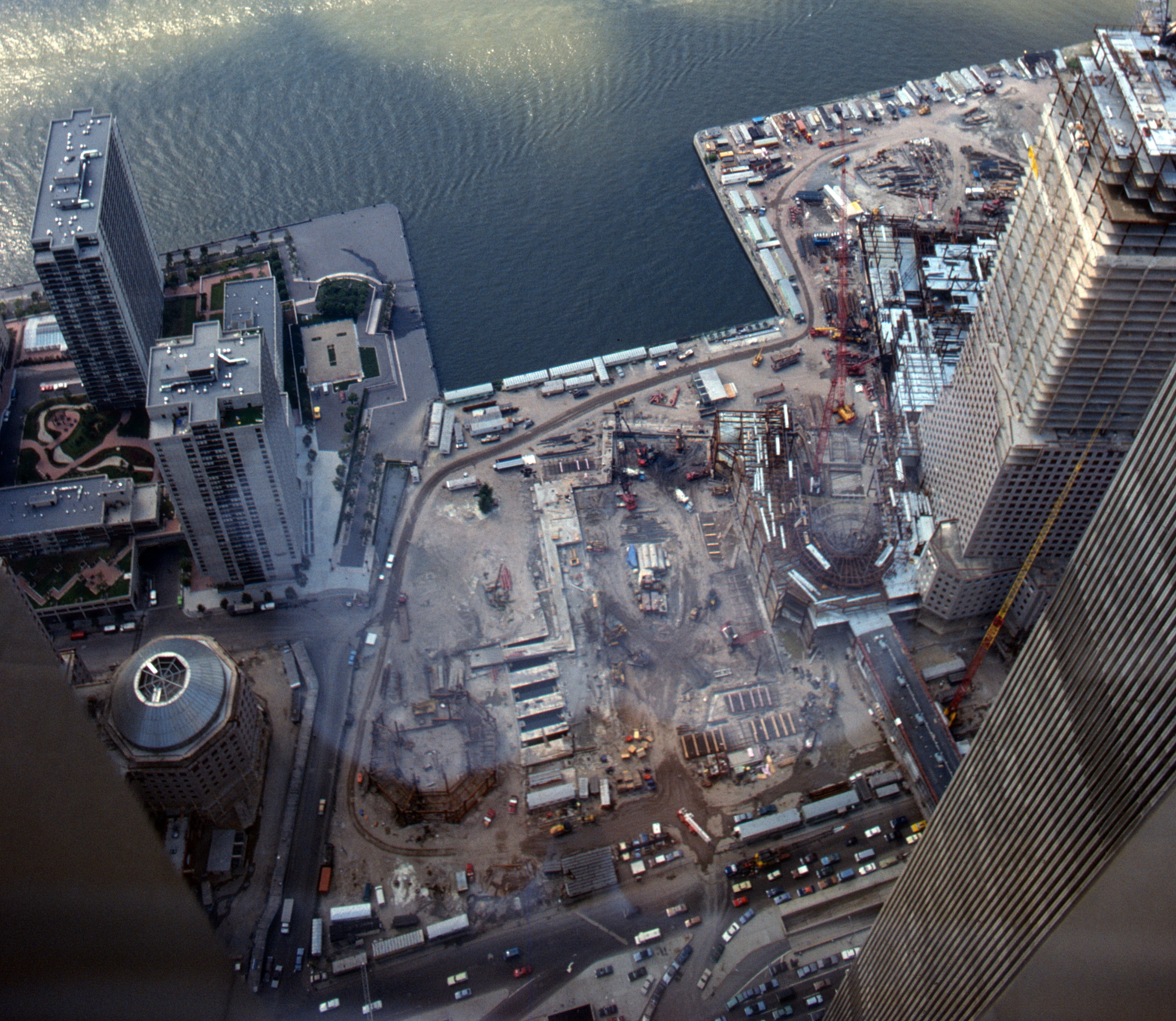
The complex under construction in 1984.

Designed by architect César Pelli, with Adamson Associates, the World Financial Center complex was built by Olympia and York from 1983 to 1988 on the Battery Park City landfill. This was reclaimed land on the Hudson river using excavated soil and rock from construction of the World Trade Center.

During the September 11 attacks, debris severely damaged the lobby and lower floors' granite cladding and glass. It has since been fully restored and significant repairs were made to the other buildings in the complex. The Winter Garden Atrium received major structural damage to its glass and steel frame, but ceremonially reopened on September 11, 2002.

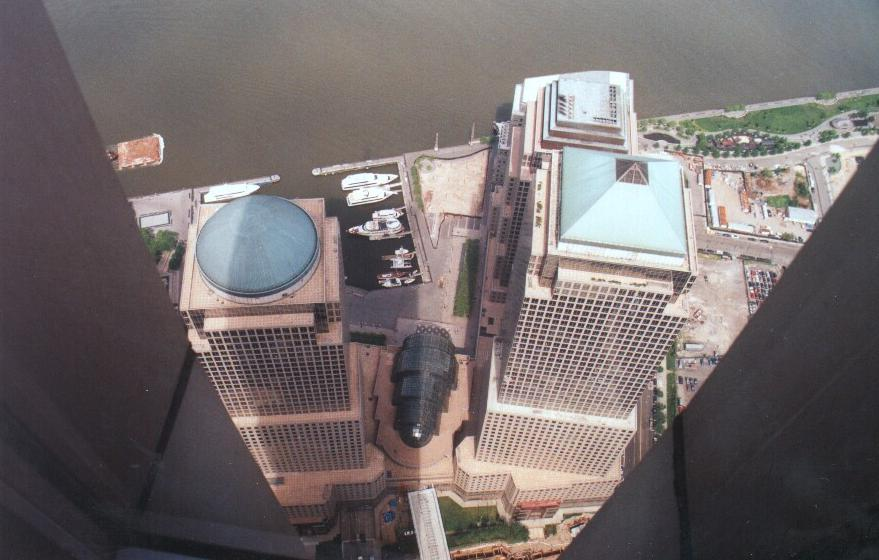
The complex viewed from the World Trade Center Windows on the World dining room

After the attacks, the World Financial Center underwent a $250 million renovation and expansion project, in conjunction with the construction of a new east–west passageway linking the complex with the World Trade Center site. The project included a transit pavilion to be built as an extension of the existing Winter Garden Atrium, on the West Street side. Preliminary plans called for the demolition of the Grand Staircase, which was the main focal entry point to Winter Garden and the waterfront, as it connected to the Vesey Street pedestrian bridge adjacent to the original World Trade Center. The Grand Staircase has also been used as an amphitheater; thus, the plans for demolition had outraged residents, who promptly appealed for its preservation in the latest redevelopment plans. The transit pavilion opened in 2013, and is located at 100 West Street.

Leasable space on the lower floors of the office towers underwent conversions and expansion to accommodate new retail. One notable example is 2 Brookfield Place: a European-style marketplace and dining terrace opened in 2013. The space between 3 and 4 Brookfield Place, at 225 Vesey Street, which contained retail, expanded to accommodate in‑line retail and high-end fashion retail, according to the plans and renderings. With some restaurants and retail temporarily closed due to construction, a food truck court was in operation beginning in early 2012 on North End Avenue. Various food trucks that operate around New York City, serving a variety of foods, service the Brookfield Place/Battery Park City area five days a week during lunch hours. A new 2,000-seat food court comprising existing restaurants, such as Le District and Hudson Eats, and new restaurants, opened in stages between November 2014 and March 2015; the food area is projected to generate about $120 million of revenue annually. Le District includes the Michelin-starred restaurant L'Appart. Overall, the intent is to drive more tourism in the area with the retail and the new access to the passageway under West Street. It is also being developed as a catalyst to integrate and drive development in the adjacent largely residential Battery Park City area. An inland harbor called the North Cove Marina is also part of the complex and between all the buildings.

Brookfield Properties bought the adjacent One North End Avenue building, headquarters of the New York Mercantile Exchange, in 2013, for US$200 million, and integrated it into the complex. Following expansion, the entire World Financial Center complex was renamed Brookfield Place, in conjunction with similar complexes in Toronto, Calgary, and Perth owned by Brookfield. The name change took place in 2014.

== Ownership ==
Brookfield Place is owned by New York-based Brookfield Asset Management, except for the space occupied by American Express, which is owned by the American Express Company. 250 Vesey Street serves as the United States headquarters for Brookfield Asset Management. Brookfield Place has its own zip code, 10281. The buildings' original developer was Olympia and York, also based in Toronto.

== Notable tenants ==
Brookfield Place has been home to offices of various companies including Merrill Lynch, Lehman Brothers, Oppenheimer & Co., RBC Capital Markets, Nomura Group, American Express, Institute of Culinary Education, Bank of New York Mellon, Jane Street Capital, Time Inc. 95.5 K-LOVE, 96.7 Air1, and Brookfield Asset Management. In 2014, the complex was given its current name following the completion of extensive renovations. Brookfield Place is also the home of College Board, the nonprofit managing both Advanced Placement and the SAT.

== List of buildings and amenities ==
Building/amenity	Previous names	Year opened	Height	No. of stories	Gross leasable area	Roof type	Notes
200 Liberty Street	One World Financial Center	1986	577 feet (176 m)	40	1,628,000 square feet (151,200 m^{2})	Truncated square pyramid	
225 Liberty Street	Two World Financial Center	1987	645 feet (197 m)	44	2,667,222 square feet (247,793.0 m^{2})	Round dome	Colloquially the South Tower
200 Vesey Street	Three World Financial Center	1985	739 feet (225 m)	51	2,491,000 square feet (231,400 m^{2})	Pyramid	Colloquially the American Express Tower
250 Vesey Street	Four World Financial Center	1986	500 feet (150 m)	34	1,800,000 square feet (170,000 m^{2})	Ziggurat	Colloquially the North Tower
Winter Garden Atrium	—N/a	1988	120 feet (37 m)	10	295,000 square feet (27,400 m^{2})	Glass atrium	
One North End Avenue	Five World Financial Center (retroactively)	1997	255 feet (78 m)	16	500,000 square feet (46,000 m^{2})	Flat	Colloquially 300 Vesey Street and the New York Mercantile Exchange Building; integrated into Brookfield Place in 2013
North Cove Marina	—N/a	1989	—N/a	—N/a	—N/a	—N/a	Colloquially World Trade Center Yacht Harbor and Marina, North Cove Yacht Harbor; acquired by Brookfield Properties along with the rest of the complex

The Winter Garden Atrium is a 45,000 square feet (4,200 m^{2}) glass domed pavilion housing various plants, trees and flowers, also shopping areas, cafes (located between buildings 2 and 3), rebuilt 2002 after terrorist attacks on September 11, 2001. The pavilion also exhibits a range of contemporary artists including Reyna Noriega, Julia Whitney Barnes, Tatiana Arocha, Anne Beffel, Jane Benson, Curtis Cuffie, Charles Goldman, Elke Lehmann, Pia Lindman, Brian P. McGrath, Andrea Ray, and Alex Villar.

== Unbuilt "Tower E" ==
Early in the planning of Brookfield Place (then World Financial Center), a 5th tower, "Tower E," was planned across Vesey Street from the complex, on the site of the Goldman Sachs headquarters. Tower E was never built. Only 4 images have been found. One of the early detailed models is shown on John A. Simonetti's website, under his architectural gallery, as "Tower E, The World Financial Center, New York, NY"

== Gallery ==
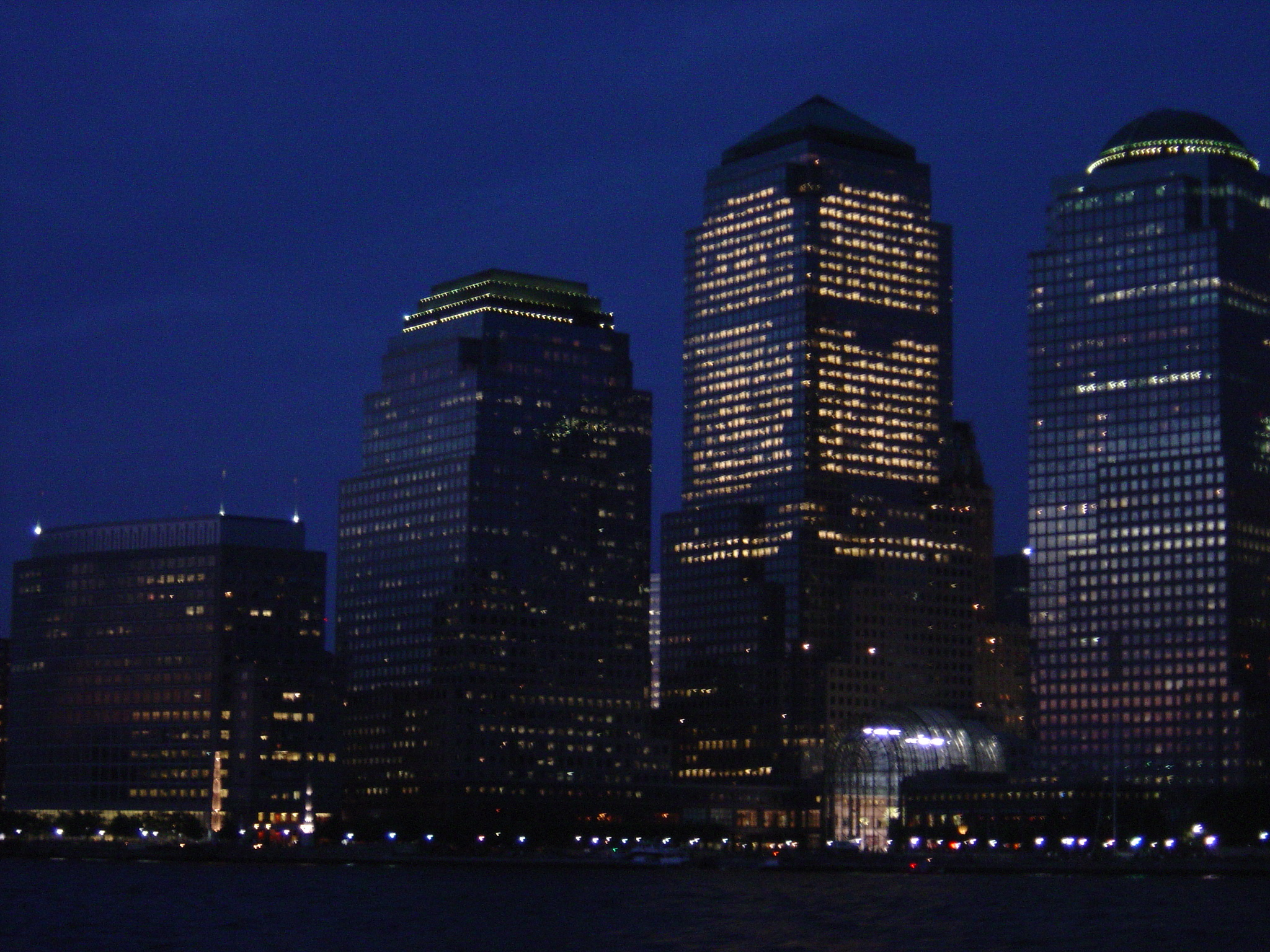
World Financial Center at night (2006)

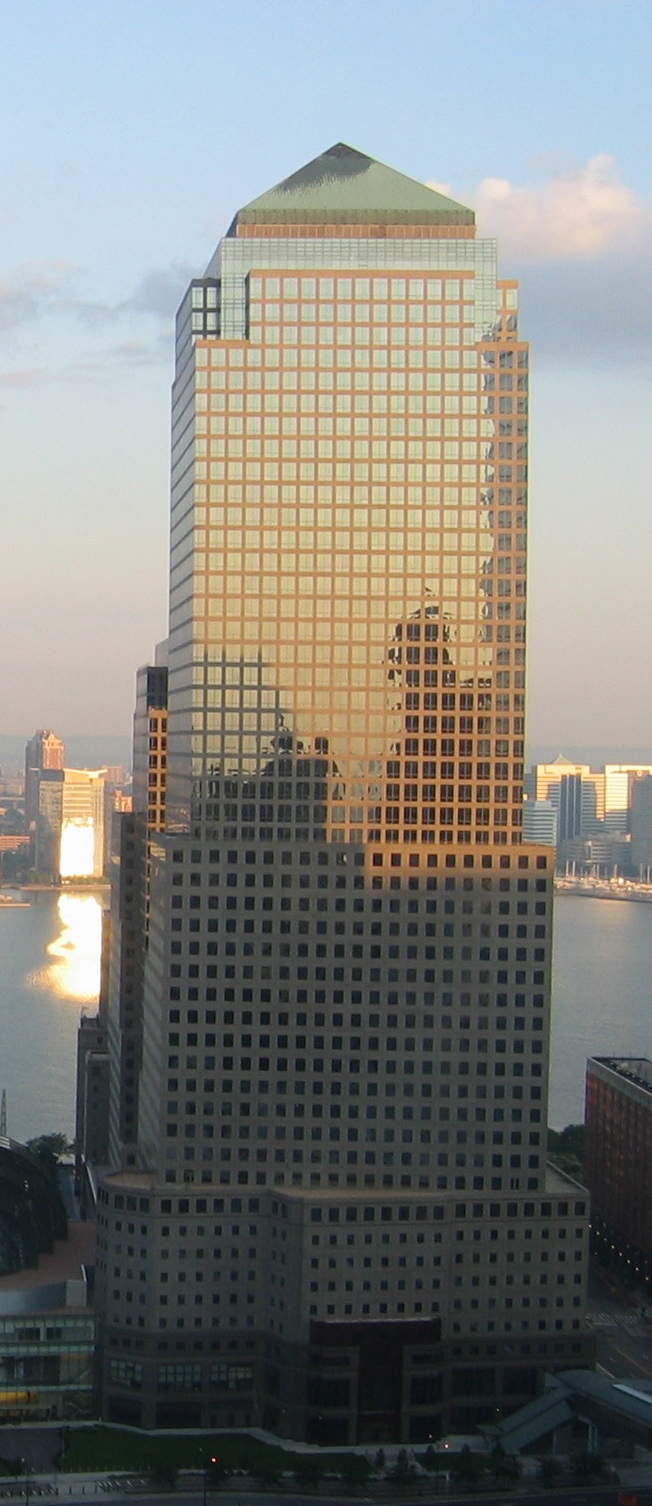
200 Vesey Street

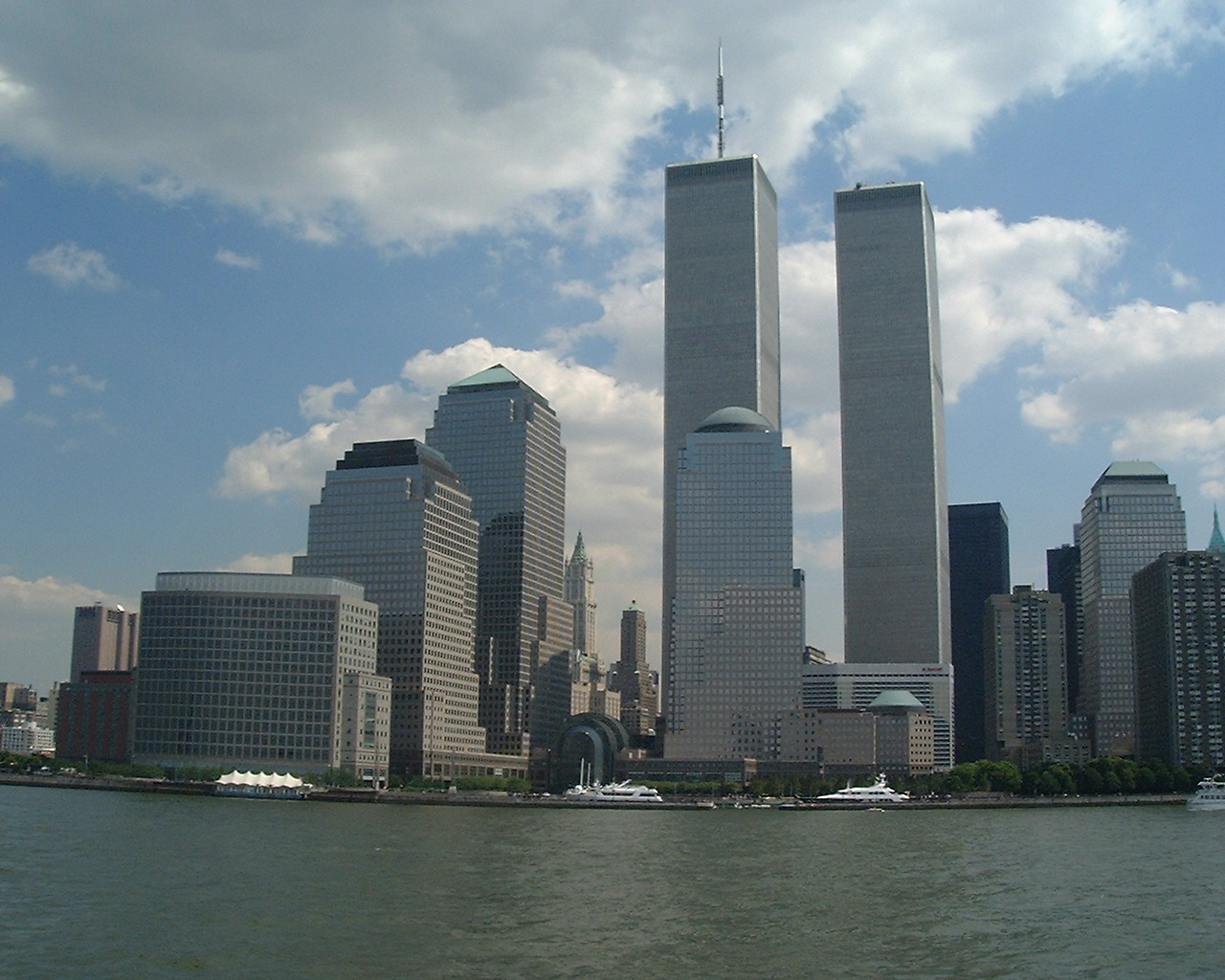
Standing alongside the World Trade Center, as it appeared in August 2000

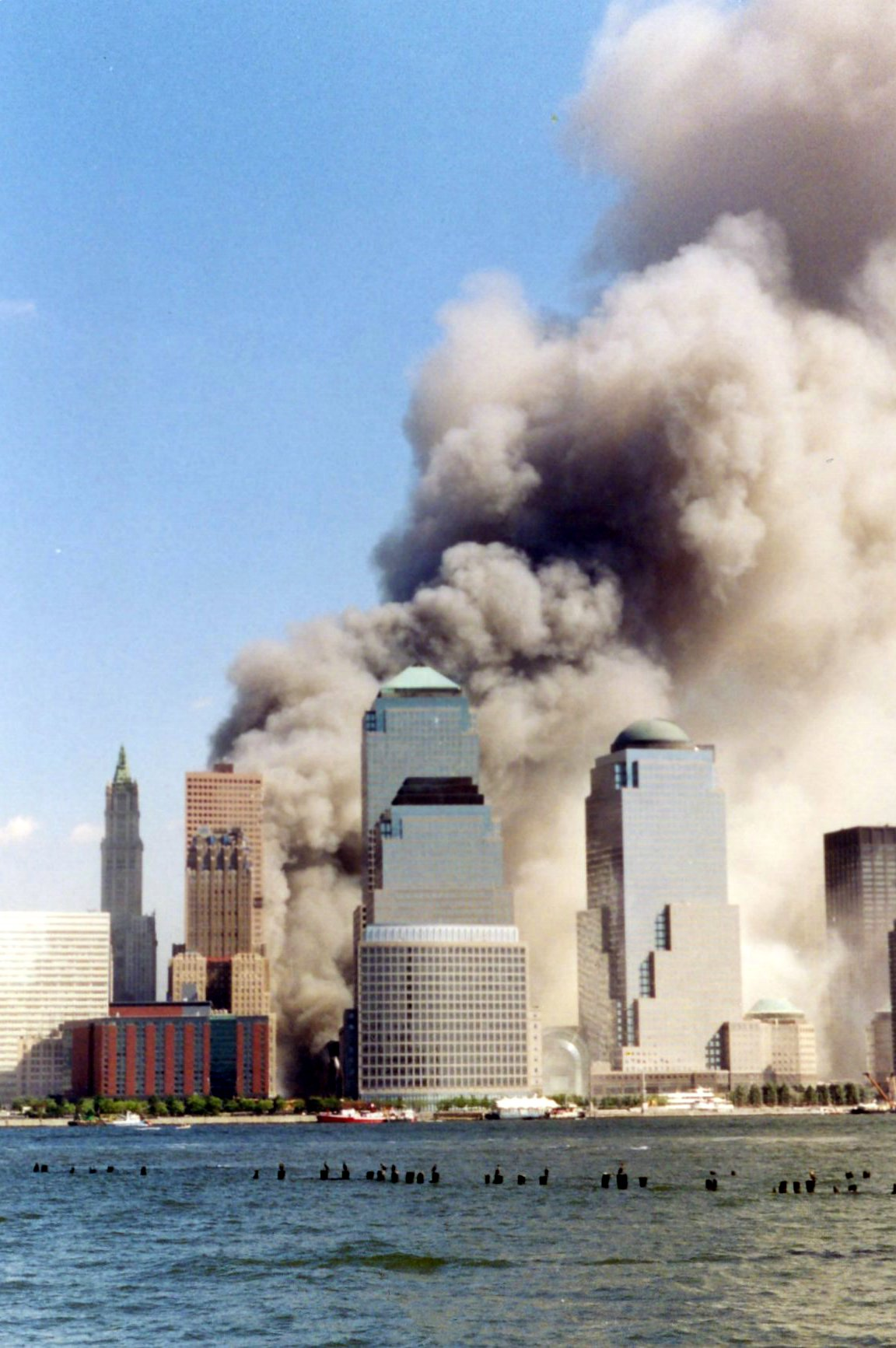
Picture taken just after the Twin Towers collapsed as a result of the September 11th attacks in 2001

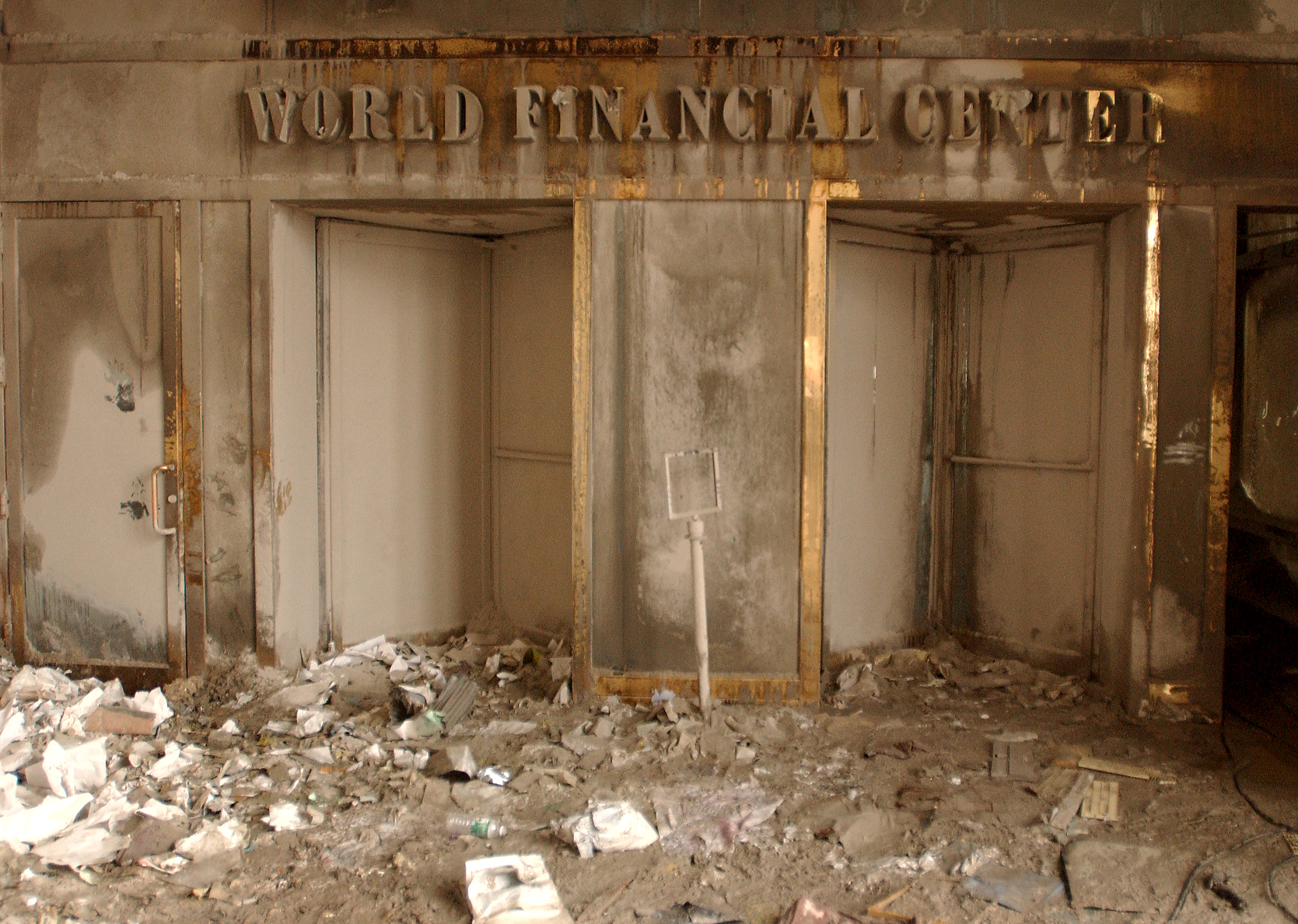
Entrance of one of the World Financial Center buildings on September 14, 2001, three days after being damaged following the 9/11 attacks

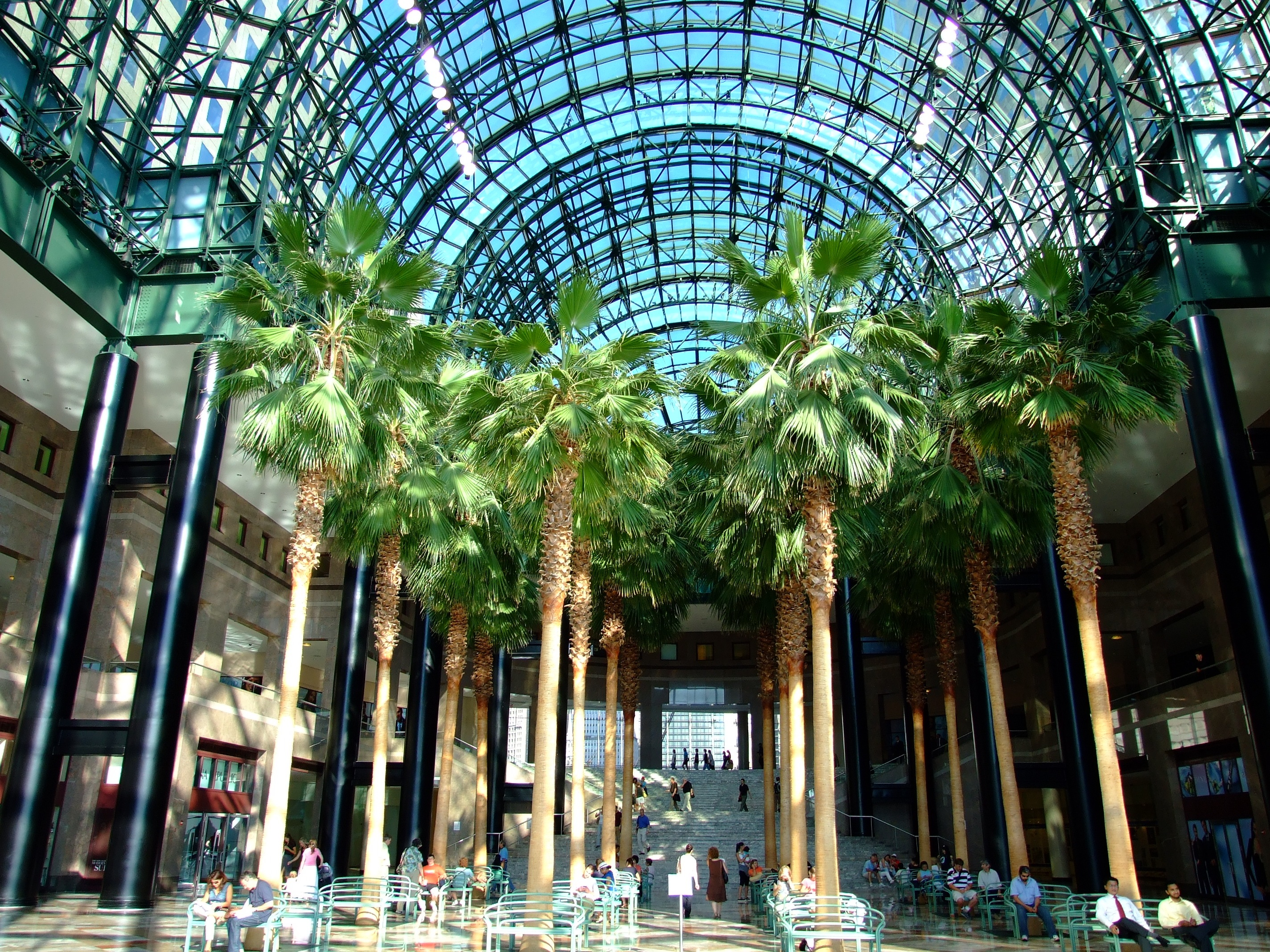
The Winter Garden Atrium, as it appeared in June 2007

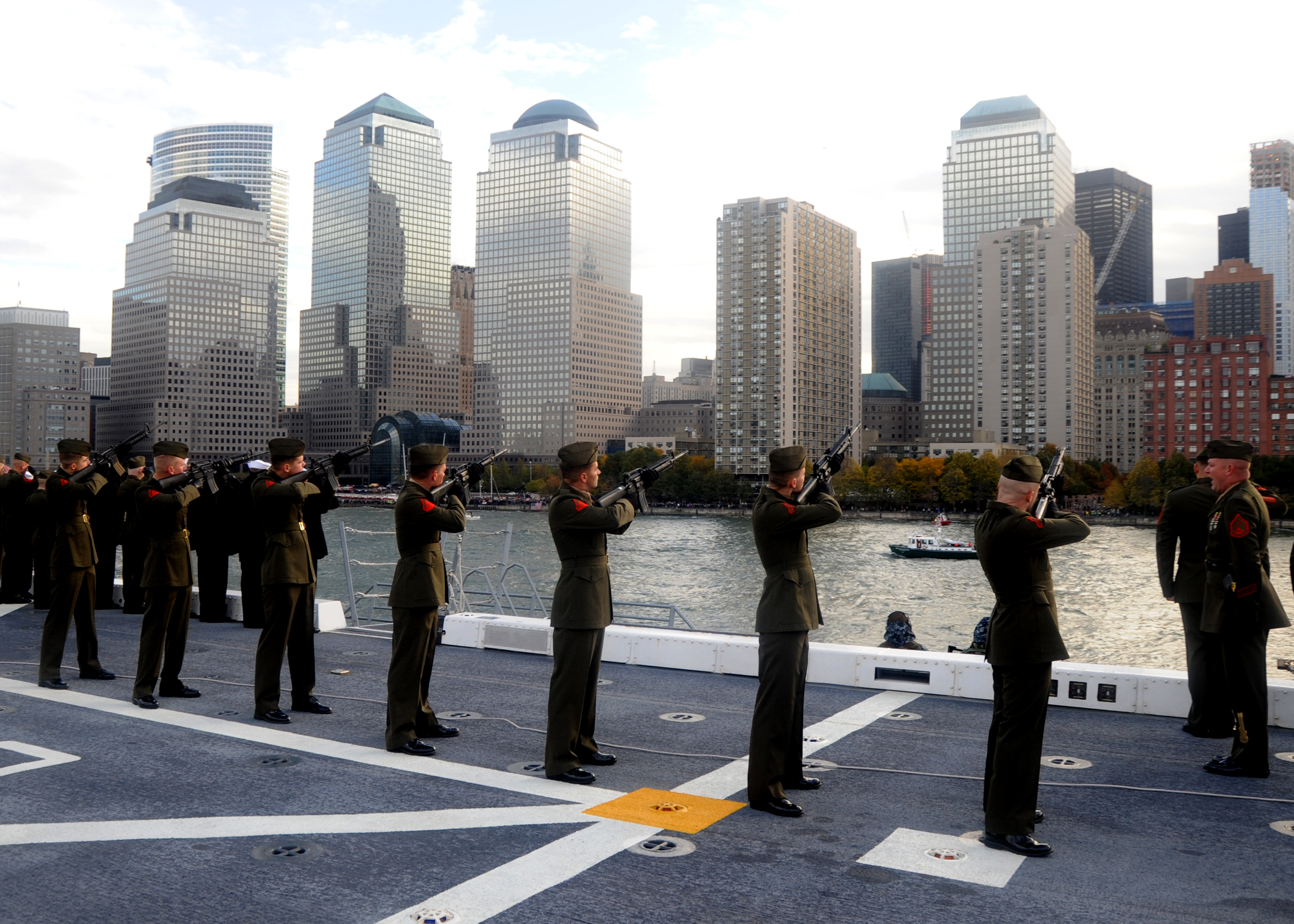
As seen from on board the United States Navy amphibious transport dock ship, the USS New York (LPD-21), in November 2009

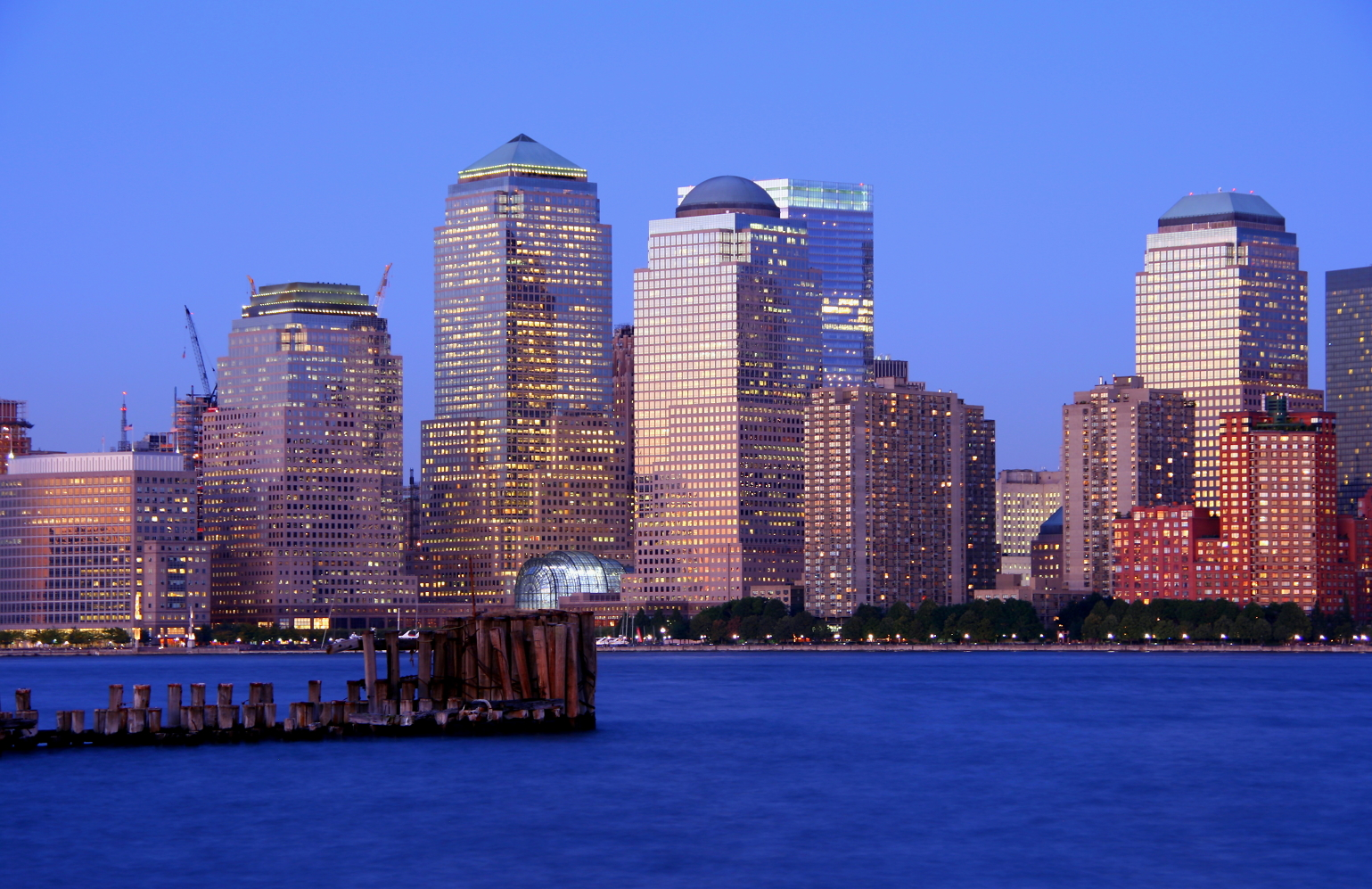
World Financial Center in the evening (2007)
