= 200 Vesey Street =

Office skyscraper in Manhattan, New York

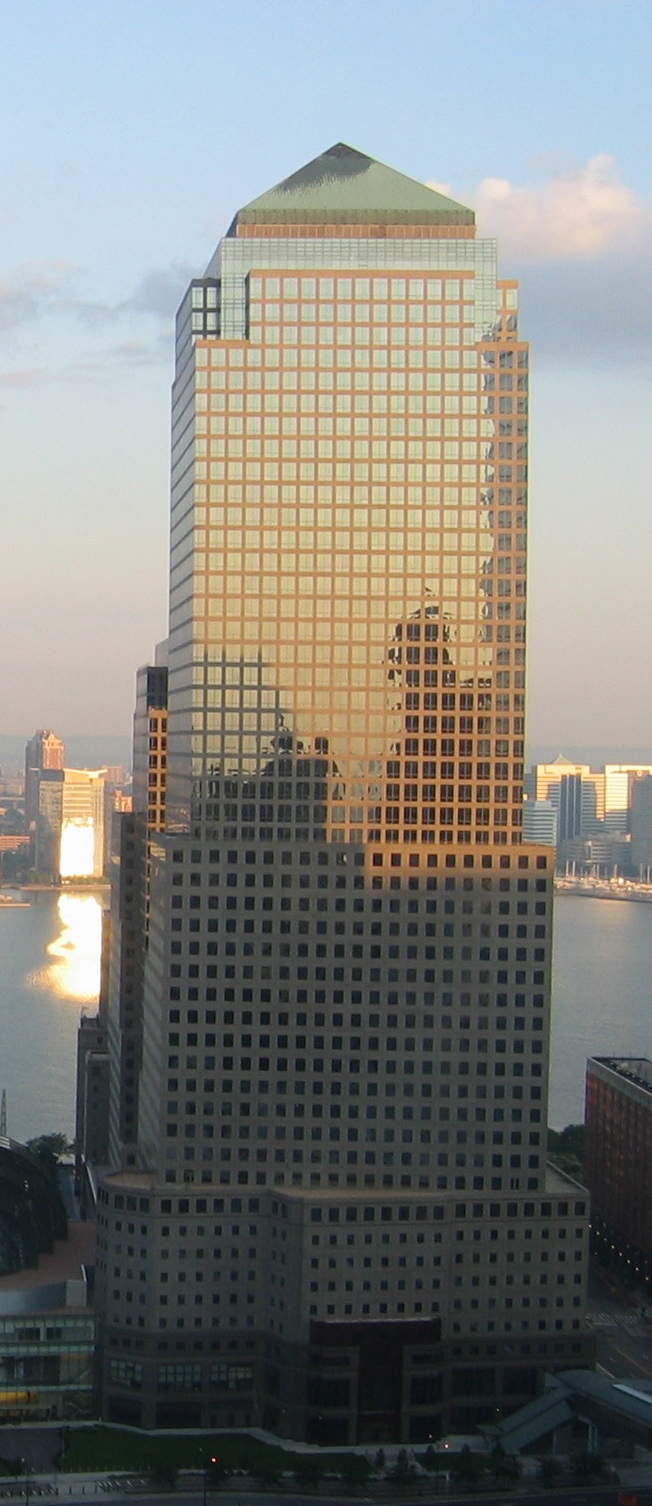

General information
- Status: Completed
- Type: Office
- Architectural style: Postmodern
- Location: 200 Vesey Street; New York, NY 10285; U.S.
- Coordinates: 40°42′49″N 74°00′53″W
- Construction started: 1983
- Completed: 1985
- Opened: 1986
- Cost: $800 million (USD)
- Owner: American Express (lower half); Brookfield Properties (upper half)

Height
- Antenna spire: 739 ft (225 m)

Technical details
- Floor count: 51
- Floor area: 2,491,000 sq ft (231,400 m^{2})

Design and construction
- Architects: Haines Lundberg Waehler, Cesar Pelli & Associates
- Structural engineer: Thornton-Tomasetti Engineers

200 Vesey Street, formerly known as Three World Financial Center and also known as the American Express Tower, is one of four towers that comprise the Brookfield Place complex in the Battery Park City, directly adjacent to the Financial District of Lower Manhattan in New York City. Rising 51 floors and 739 feet (225 m), it is situated between the Hudson River and the World Trade Center. The building opened in 1986 as part of the World Financial Center and was designed by Haines Lundberg Waehler and Cesar Pelli & Associates.

== Description ==
The building is an example of postmodern architecture, as designed by Cesar Pelli & Associates, and contains over 2.1 million square feet (195,000 m^{2}) of rentable office area. It connects to the rest of the World Financial Center complex through a courtyard leading to the Winter Garden, a dramatic glass-and-steel public space with a 120 ft (37 m) vaulted ceiling under which there is an assortment of trees and plants, including sixteen 40 ft (12 m) palm trees from the Mojave Desert. Pelli used the building's basic aesthetic again for the One Canada Square tower in London's Canary Wharf development. Canary Wharf was, like the World Financial Center, a project by Canadian developers Olympia & York, and One Canada Square was designed by the same principal architect. One Canada Square differs from 200 Vesey Street in that it is clad with a stainless steel curtain wall instead of stone.

Due to its status as the tallest tower in the complex, the building was subject to scathing criticism at the time of its construction. In 1985, The New York Times published an article lambasting the tower. ‟Not too long ago, it was possible to gaze all the way from mid-Manhattan to the skies over the harbor. Now, that vista has been pierced by the American Express tower being built in the World Financial Center at Battery Park City. At the moment, the skyscraper resembles a gigantic, upended, rectilinear fish skeleton. As construction proceeds, however, and the floors fill in, there will be a solid wall where there was once a generous slice of sky."

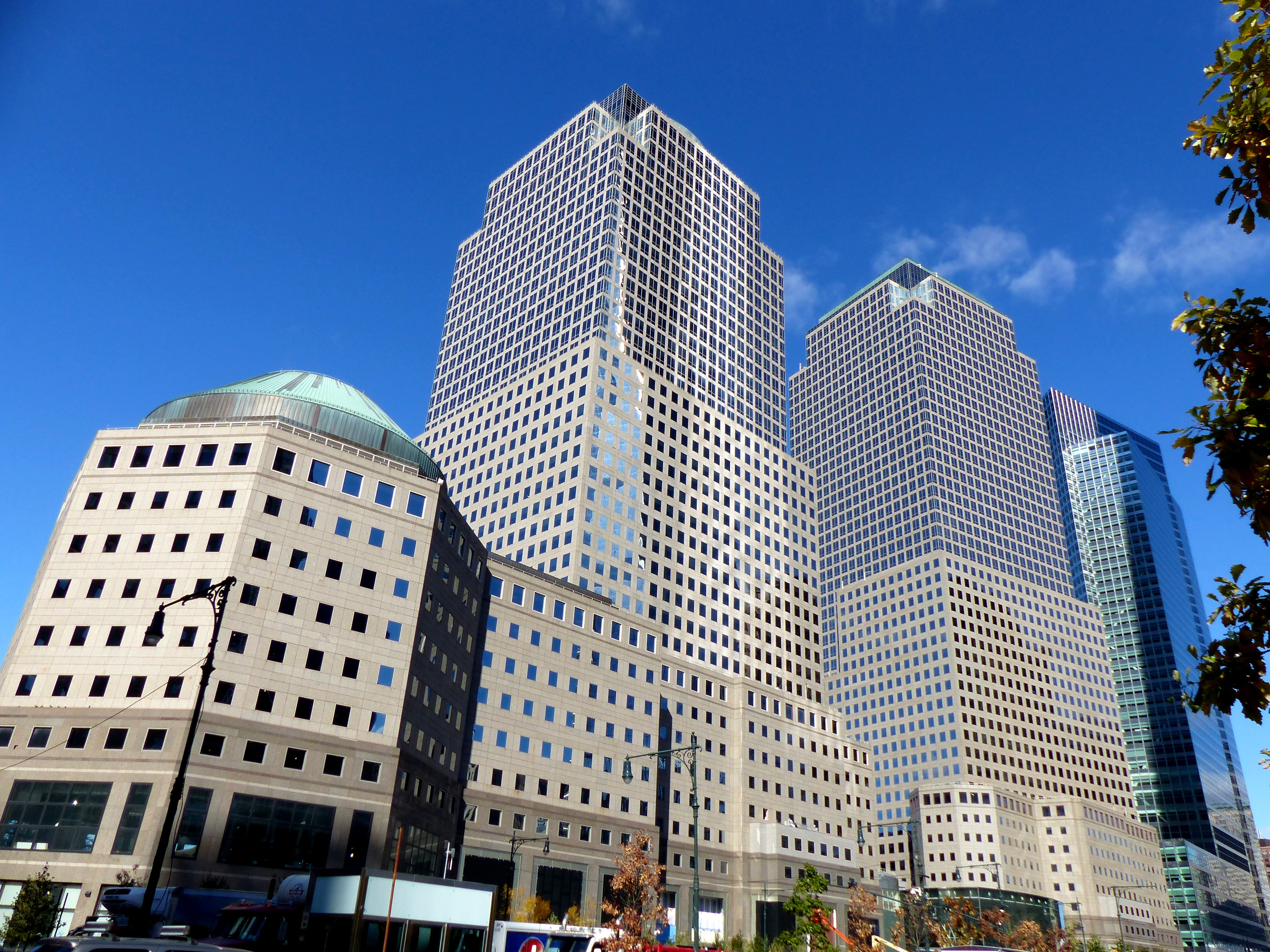
200 Vesey Street, October 2015.

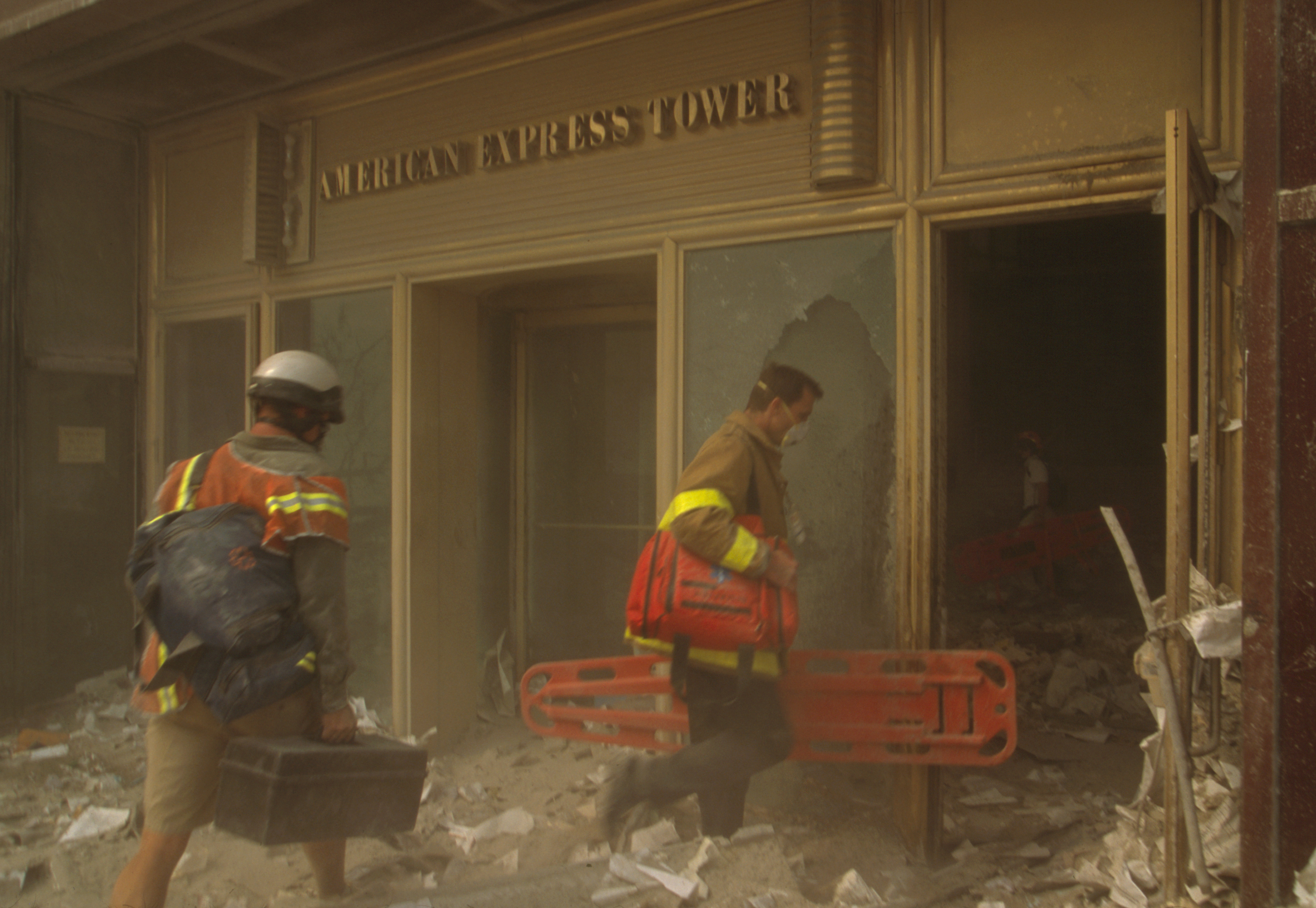
Two rescue workers entering the American Express Tower after the attacks on the World Trade Center.

Three World Financial Center was severely damaged by the falling debris when the World Trade Center towers collapsed on September 11, 2001. The building's southeast corner took heavy structural damage, though the effects were not enough to create a threat of collapse. The building had to be closed for repairs from September 11, 2001 until May 2002 as a result of damage sustained in the terrorist attacks. A memorial was constructed to honor the 11 employees of American Express who were victims of the September 11 attacks, it is named the Eleven Tears Memorial.

3 World Financial Center is today the world headquarters of American Express, and was once World Headquarters of Lehman Brothers Holdings Inc. It was renamed 200 Vesey Street when the rest of the complex became Brookfield Place in 2014.

== See also ==
- World Trade Center
- Brookfield Place (New York City)
- List of tallest buildings in New York City
- List of tallest buildings in the United States
