= North Cove Marina =

Marina in Manhattan, New York

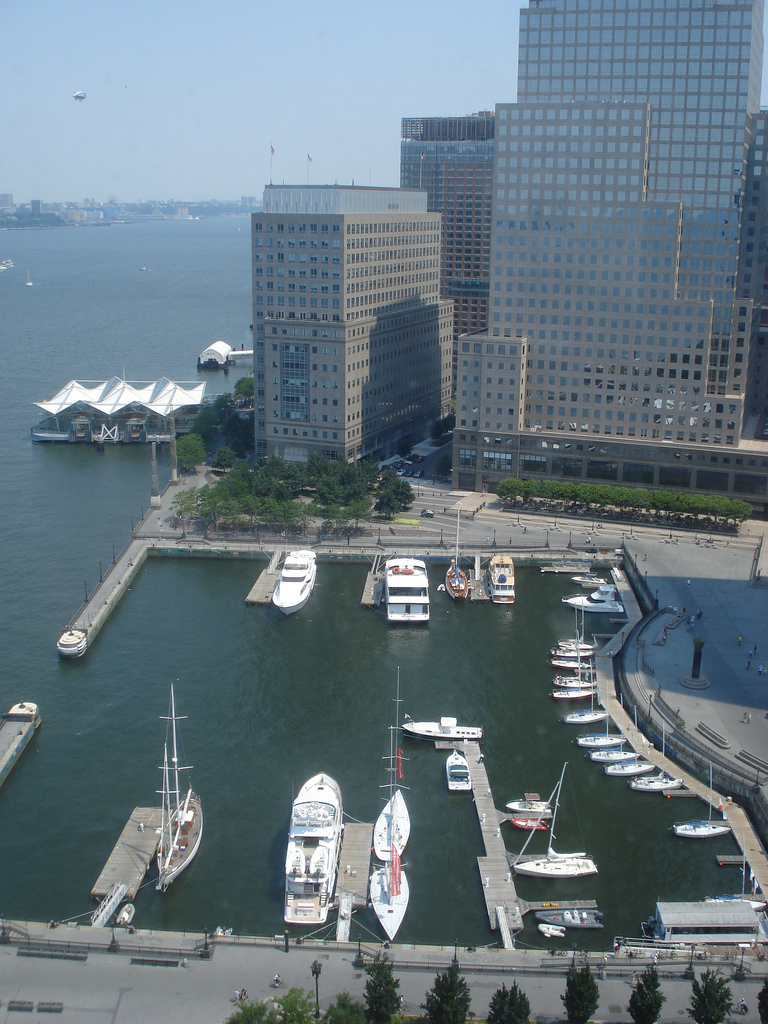
- View of the marina, July 2008
- Interactive map of North Cove Marina

Location
- Country: United States
- Location: Manhattan, New York
- Coordinates: 40°42′46″N 74°01′01″W

Details
- Opened: 1989; 37 years ago
- Owned by: Port Authority of New York and New Jersey
- Type of Harbor: Artificial
- No. of berths: 26

Statistics
- Website; Official website

The North Cove Marina, also known as World Trade Center Yacht Harbor and Marina, is a municipal inland harbor in Manhattan, New York. The marina is primarily used for 80 to 150-foot mega-yachts and is part of Brookfield Place.

== History ==
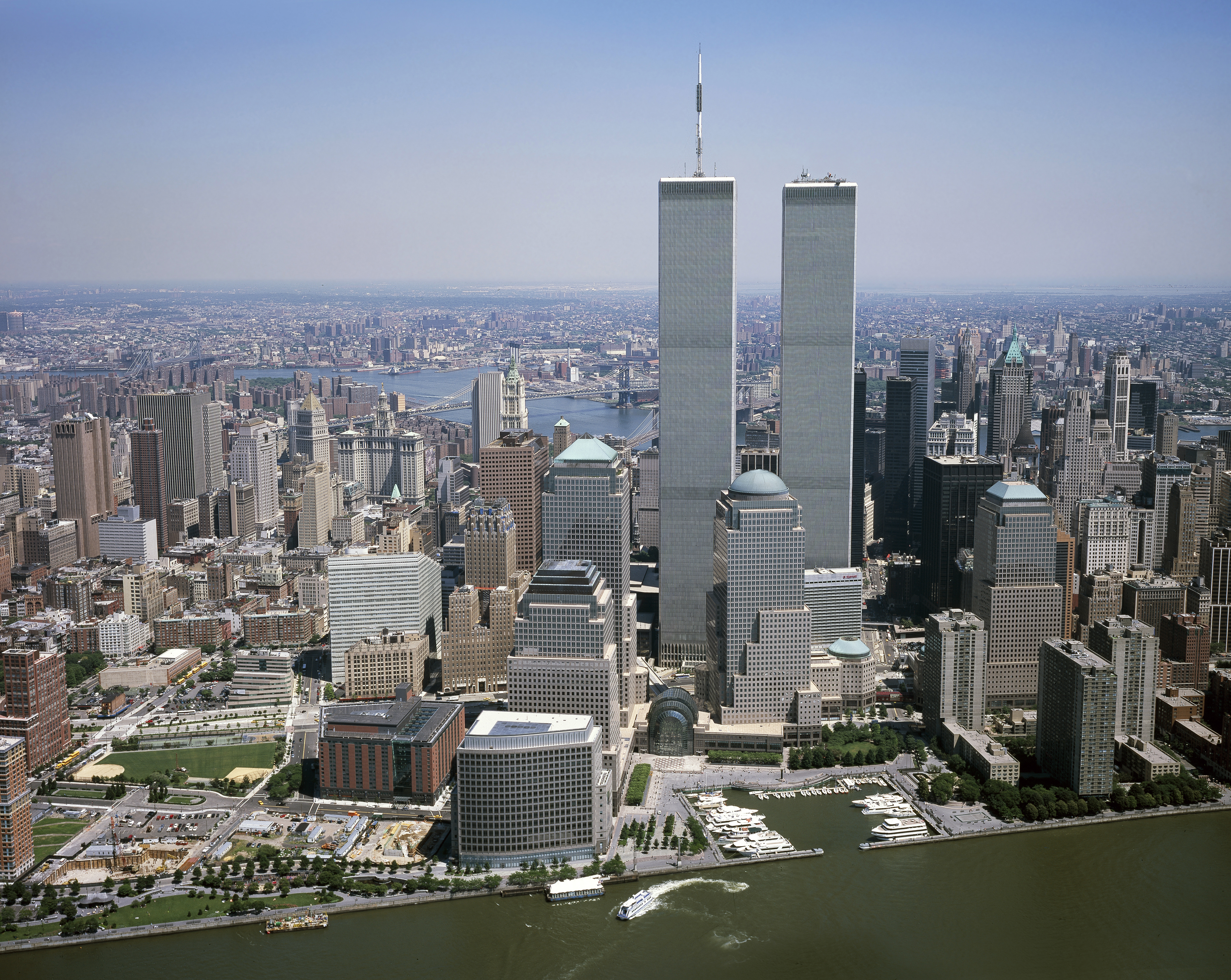
Marina in front of the World Financial Center and Twin Towers, 2001

Built in 1989, it claimed to be the first European-style mega-yacht harbor in the continental United States. It is located between the buildings of the Brookfield Place complex and directly in front of the new World Trade Center. During the terrorist attacks on September 11, 2001 it was used to rescue people from the collapse of the World Trade Center. Later that day, an American flag from a yacht docked in the marina was raised by firefighters over the World Trade Center site. The yacht scene in the 2013 film The Wolf of Wall Street was filmed in the harbor.

In 2015, Brookfield Properties contracted with IGY Marinas to manage the marina.

The marina closed in the summer of 2025 for flood mitigation construction that is expected to last through at least 2030.

== See also ==
- World Trade Center
- Brookfield Place (New York City)
- List of marinas
