= Urstadt Biddle Properties =

Urstadt Biddle Properties, Inc.
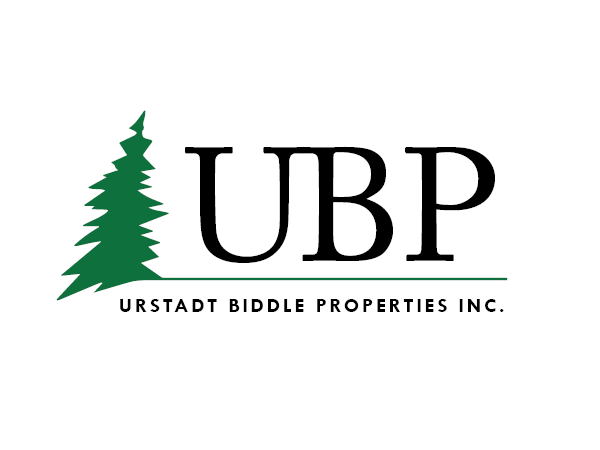

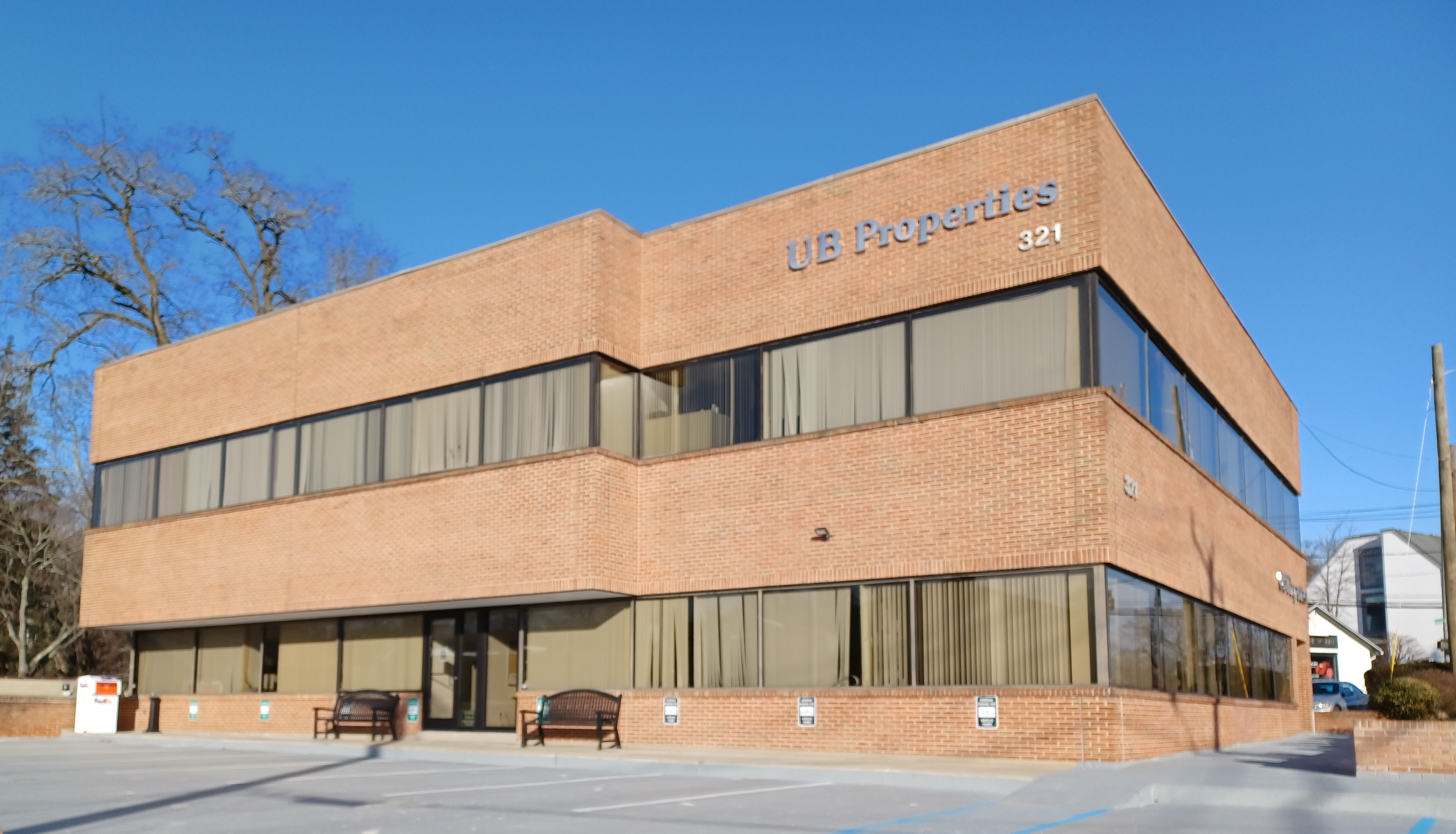
- Headquarters in Greenwich, Connecticut
- Traded as: NYSE: UBP; NYSE: UBA
- Industry: Real estate investment trust
- Founded: 1969; 57 years ago
- Fate: Acquired by Regency Centers
- Headquarters: Greenwich, Connecticut
- Key people: Willing L. Biddle (President and CEO); John Hayes (CFO); Charles D. Urstadt (Chairman)
- Revenue: ▲$135 million (2021)
- Net income: ▲$50.9 million (2021)
- Total assets: ▼$973 million (2021)
- Total equity: ▲$575 million (2021)
- Number of employees: 57 (2021)
- Website: ubproperties.com

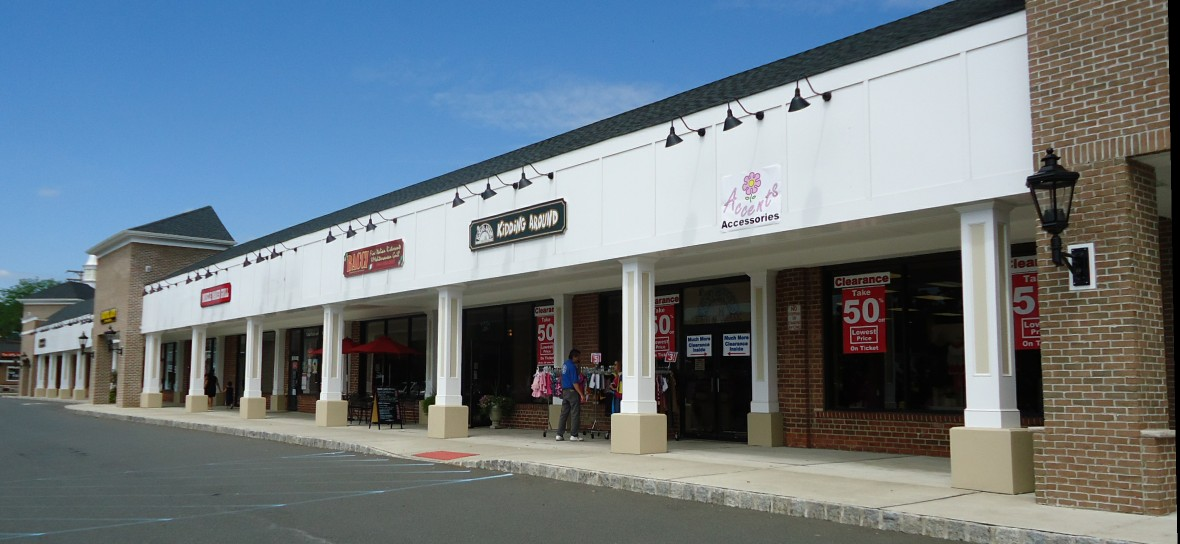
Village Shopping Center, New Providence, NJ

Urstadt Biddle Properties, Inc. was a real estate investment trust based in Greenwich, Connecticut that primarily invested in shopping centers in New York, New Jersey, and Connecticut. As of October 31, 2021, the company owned interests in 79 properties comprising 5.1 million square feet of gross leasable area. The company was merged with Regency Centers Corp on August 18, 2023.

== History ==
The company was founded in 1969 as Hubbard Real Estate Investments, an affiliate of Merrill Lynch. The company was listed on the New York Stock Exchange in 1970.

Charles J. Urstadt joined the company as a director in 1975 and subsequently helped spin the company off from Merrill Lynch. In 1989, he became chief executive officer. The company was then known as HRE Properties.

When Urstadt took over as CEO, he narrowed the company's focus from a diverse portfolio to one specializing in neighborhood shopping centers, typically anchored by grocery stores, in the suburban New York region including Westchester County, New York and Putnam County, New York, and Fairfield County, Connecticut. The new concentration was made in order to take advantage of the area's affluent population; fewer stores in the area relative to shoppers; the company's extensive market knowledge; and more efficient management of the properties. Another strategic decision Urstadt implemented was to keep the company's debt low relative to the size of its assets.

Willing L. Biddle, a real estate executive, joined the company in 1993 as vice president of retail. He was later promoted to various positions and became president and chief operating officer of the company in 1996. In 1997, the company was renamed Urstadt Biddle Properties, Inc.

In 2013, Urstadt stepped down as chief executive officer but remained as chairman of the board of directors. Biddle became the chief executive officer and retained his title of president.

In 2002, the company acquired Ridgeway Shopping Center in Stamford, Connecticut for $89.3 million from a partnership controlled by Larry Silverstein and Howard Menaker. It was the largest open-air shopping center in Fairfield County. It comprised 331,000 square feet of retail space and 29,000 square feet of office space. Thirty-five tenants occupied the property including Bed Bath & Beyond, Staples Inc., Old Navy and a 60,000-square-foot Stop & Shop grocery store. In 2011, the company purchased the remaining stake in the property that it did not purchase in the 2002 sale for $7.4 million.

In 2005, the company acquired The Docks shopping center in Stratford, Connecticut for $50.25 million. The 30-acre site had 14 tenants including Stop & Shop and Staples. Also included on the site was a 192-slip marina.

In May 2010, the company acquired The New Milford Shopping Plaza for $22.5 million. The property was located on Route 7 in New Milford, Connecticut and included Walmart and Stop & Shop as tenants.

In 2013, the company acquired the Village Shopping Center in New Providence, New Jersey for $34.85 million. The 110,000-square-foot center was anchored by The Great Atlantic & Pacific Tea Company with other tenants including CVS Pharmacy, Smashburger IP Holder LLC, and Investors Bank.

In 2014, the company acquired two properties in Greenwich, Connecticut for $47.4 million. One property was a 48,000-square-foot mixed-use property on East Putnam Avenue (Route 1) in Cos Cob, Connecticut. The second property was in Old Greenwich, Connecticut on Arcadia Road. It included an 18,200-square-foot building with Kings Food Markets as tenant.

Also in 2014, the company purchased 4 shopping centers in New Jersey for $124.5 million. The 4 centers were the Midland Park Shopping Center in Midland Park, New Jersey (130,000 square feet); the Pompton Lakes Town Square (125,000 square feet); the Cedar Hill Shopping Center (43,000 square feet); and the Meadtown Shopping Center in Kinnelon, New Jersey (77,000 square feet).

On March 1, 2017, the company sold 60 S. Broadway, White Plains, New York for $53 million to Lennar. The 3.53-acre site included the former Westchester Pavilion. The sale was the 3rd highest priced sale in Westchester County, New York in 2017.

Charles D. Urstadt was named chairman of the company effective January 1, 2019. Urstadt was first elected to the company's board of directors in 1997 and elected vice chairman in 2017. Prior to joining the company, he was a real estate executive with Halstead Property, Brown Harris Stevens and Pearce, Urstadt, Mayer & Greer. He succeeded his father, Charles J. Urstadt, who remained on the board of directors as chairman emeritus until his death in 2020.

On May 18, 2023, Urstadt Biddle Properties and Regency Centers Corporation announced that the two companies will merge. Under the terms of the agreement, Urstadt Biddle will be acquired by Regency. The transaction was valued at approximately $1.4 billion, including the assumption of debt and preferred stock. At the time of the announcement, the transaction was expected to close in the third quarter or early in the fourth quarter of 2023.

In a news release, Willing L. Biddle, CEO of Urstadt Biddle said: “"Regency has a long, successful history of being a sector and industry leader in the ownership and operation of high-quality shopping centers around the country, with one of the best-regarded teams in the REIT industry. I have no doubt that our portfolio will be in great hands under Regency leadership, and as a future Regency shareholder I look forward to the scale and platform benefits that the combination of our two companies will provide.”

At the time of the announcement, Urstadt Biddle’s portfolio of 77 properties included extensive holdings in Connecticut including Ridgeway Shopping Center in Stamford, New Milford Plaza, Danbury Square, The Dock in Stratford, Shelton Square, Goodwives Shopping Center in Darien, High Ridge Center in Stamford and Gateway Center in Wilton. Regency CEO Lisa Palmer called the portfolio “irreplaceable assets.”

Regency Centers announced the merger was complete on August 18, 2023. Urstadt Biddle shareholders approved the transaction at a special meeting of shareholders on August 16, 2023.
