= The TriBattery Pops Tom Goodkind Conductor =

The TriBattery Pops - Tom Goodkind, Conductor
- Members of the TriBattery Pops Tom Goodkind Conductor

Background information
- Origin: Battery Park City, New York, U.S.
- Genres: Community band Marching bands Alternative rock
- Years active: 2004-present
- Labels: TriBattery Pops available on iTunes; Spotify

The TriBattery Pops - Tom Goodkind, Conductor is an all-volunteer community band, and is Lower Manhattan's first such band for over a hundred years. The band's founder and conductor is what songwriter Chris Butler of The Waitresses, once called "a master of shrewd thinking," an apt label for the punk-rocker turned community bandleader.

In a review of their performance with Trisha Brown, the N.Y. Times called the Pops "robustly rhythmic."

The group records an album annually, and has an album of all of its best material (25 songs) titled "Community Band" available through Apple iTunes. Their music, often up for Grammy Nominations, is distributed to radio stations internationally by College Music Journal. They perform six shows a year, starting with the April Downtown Little League Parade and ending with 4th day of July fireworks near the Statue of Liberty in Wagner Park. The band's logo was designed by Marvel Comics' creator Stan Lee, the childhood next door neighbor of the conductor.

In 2013, conductor/composer Tom Goodkind had the band performing post modern classical originals and Philip Glass provided minimal music for their 10th album, Pops Art. Their 2014 was dedicated to modern jazz, especially the music of John Coltrane. In 2015, they joined the Downtown Adult Chorus to perform hits from the '60s pop drug culture. The group’s latest 2015 and 2016 albums have gone viral in the land of fine wines and fancy cheese (France). A Facebook post linking to the group’s latest albums have garnered an unprecedented 200,000 clicks and rising, of which nearly 86 percent — hail from French IP addresses, mostly young people in their 20s. In 2016, the Pop venture into early '70s disco with for their workout album, LOSE 20 POUND IN 20 DAYS, and performed for the 15th Stephen Siller Tunnel to Towers run. For 2017, the group, at the behest of the New York Philharmonic recorded Symphony No. 9 (Dvořák), which the Philharmonic promoted and archived. In 2018, the group will perform popular opera.

== Recordings ==
- Outstanding in Their Field (2004)
- West Street (2005)
- The Beat Goes On (2006)
- 13 Stars (2007)
- Under Construction (2008)
- We're In The Money (2009)
- Community Band Greatest Hits (2010)
- The Magnificent 7th (2010)
- Suspicious Package (2011)
- 10th 11th - Whitman Sampler -12inch dub step mix (2011)
- Dark (2012)
- Moombahton Marching Band Party Mix (2012)
- Pops Art (2013)
- Superstorm Sandy - Single from Pops Art (2013)
- ArtZ - Single from Pops Art (2013)
- Jazz (2014)
- Be Flat - Single from Jazz (2014)
- Turn On, Tune Up, and Drop Out (2015)
- You Know, The Actor, What's His Name - P.C. Music style mix single (2015)
- Lose 20 Pounds in 20 Days (2016)
- Hump-T Hump-t - single (2016)
- Symphony No. 9 (Dvořák)(2017)
- A Night at the Popera(2018)

== Musicians ==
Alan Sturm (trumpet)
Eldon Simms (percussion)
Elijah Thomas (flute)
Olivia Goodkind (vox and glockenspiel)
Ron Caswell (tuba)
Heidi Hunter (flute and web)
Jo Ellen Fusco (bass guitar)
Michele B. Kaufman (alto sax)
Sarah Oud (flugelhorn)
Marie Jensen (tenor sax)
Danita Pappas (clarinet)
Carla Rupp (flute)
