= Battery Park City =

Neighborhood of Manhattan in New York City

- Neighborhood
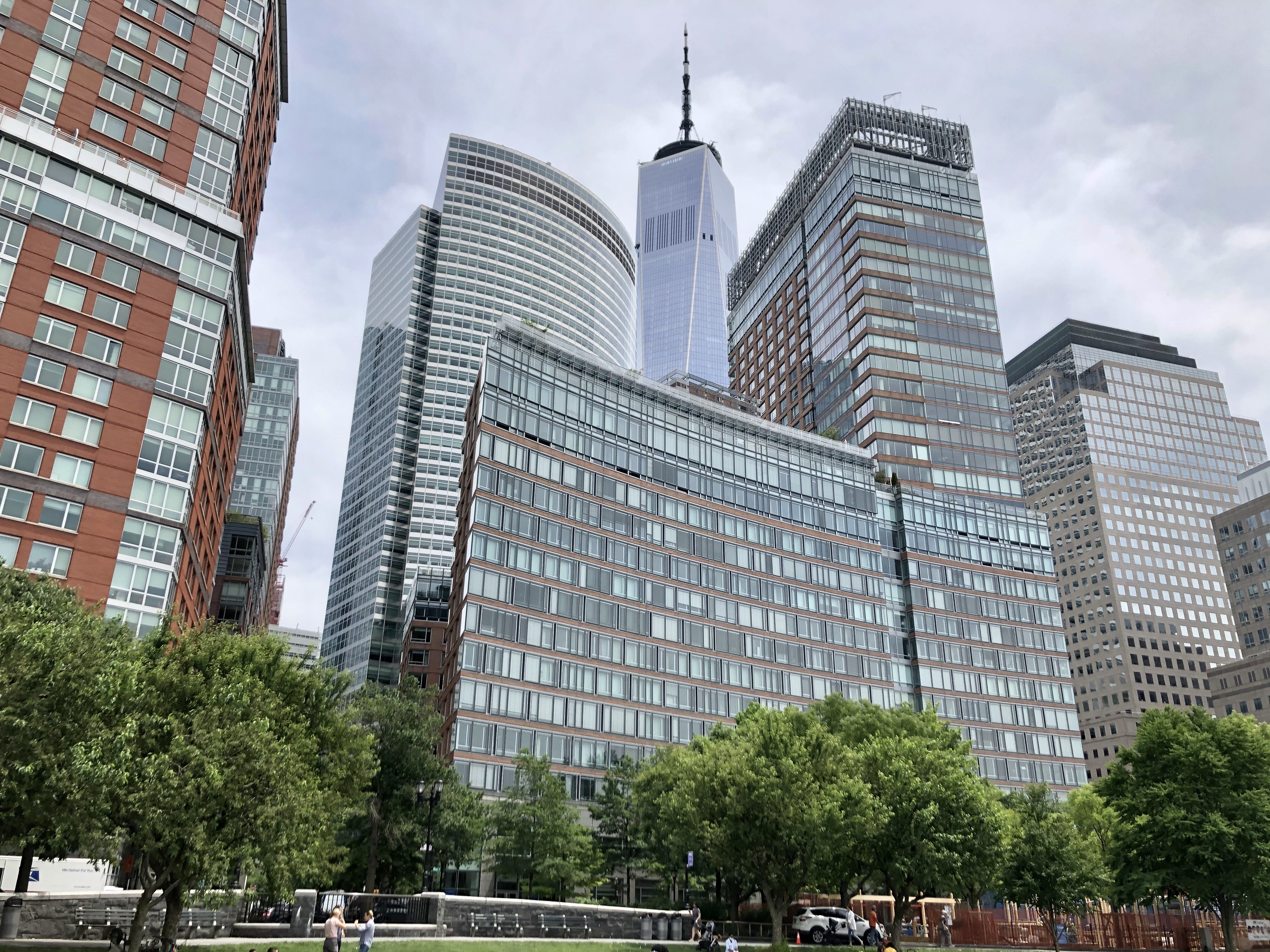
- Apartment buildings in Battery Park City, with One World Trade Center visible
- Interactive map of Battery Park City
- Coordinates: 40°42′40″N 74°1′1″W
- Country: United States
- State: New York
- City: New York City
- Borough: Manhattan
- Community District: Manhattan 1

Area
  - Total: 0.143 sq mi (0.37 km^{2})

Population (2023)
  - Total: 16,990
  - Density: 119,000/sq mi (45,900/km^{2})

Economics
  - Median income: $126,771
- Time zone: UTC−5 (Eastern)
  - Summer (DST): UTC−4 (EDT)
- ZIP Codes: 10280, 10282
- Area code: 212, 332, 646, and 917

Battery Park City is a neighborhood and planned community at the southern tip of Manhattan in New York City. The neighborhood is situated along the Hudson River waterfront, and separated from the Financial District and Tribeca by the West Side Highway. Directly to the south lies The Battery, formerly known as Battery Park, from which the neighborhood derives its name. Battery Park City is located on state-owned land managed by the Battery Park City Authority (BPCA), a New York State public-benefit corporation.

Although primarily a residential neighborhood, there also are several office buildings, including the Brookfield Place complex and 200 West Street (headquarters of Goldman Sachs). The neighborhood is also home to the Museum of Jewish Heritage, Stuyvesant High School, along with some hotels, street-level retail and restaurants. More than one-third of the area is parkland and public open space.

The land upon which Battery Park City is built was created in the 1970s by land reclamation on the Hudson River using over 3 million cubic yards (2.3 million cubic meters) of soil and rock excavated during the construction of the World Trade Center, the New York City Water Tunnel, and certain other construction projects, as well as from sand dredged from New York Harbor off Staten Island.

Battery Park City is part of Manhattan Community District 1. It is patrolled by the 1st Precinct of the New York City Police Department.

== Geography ==
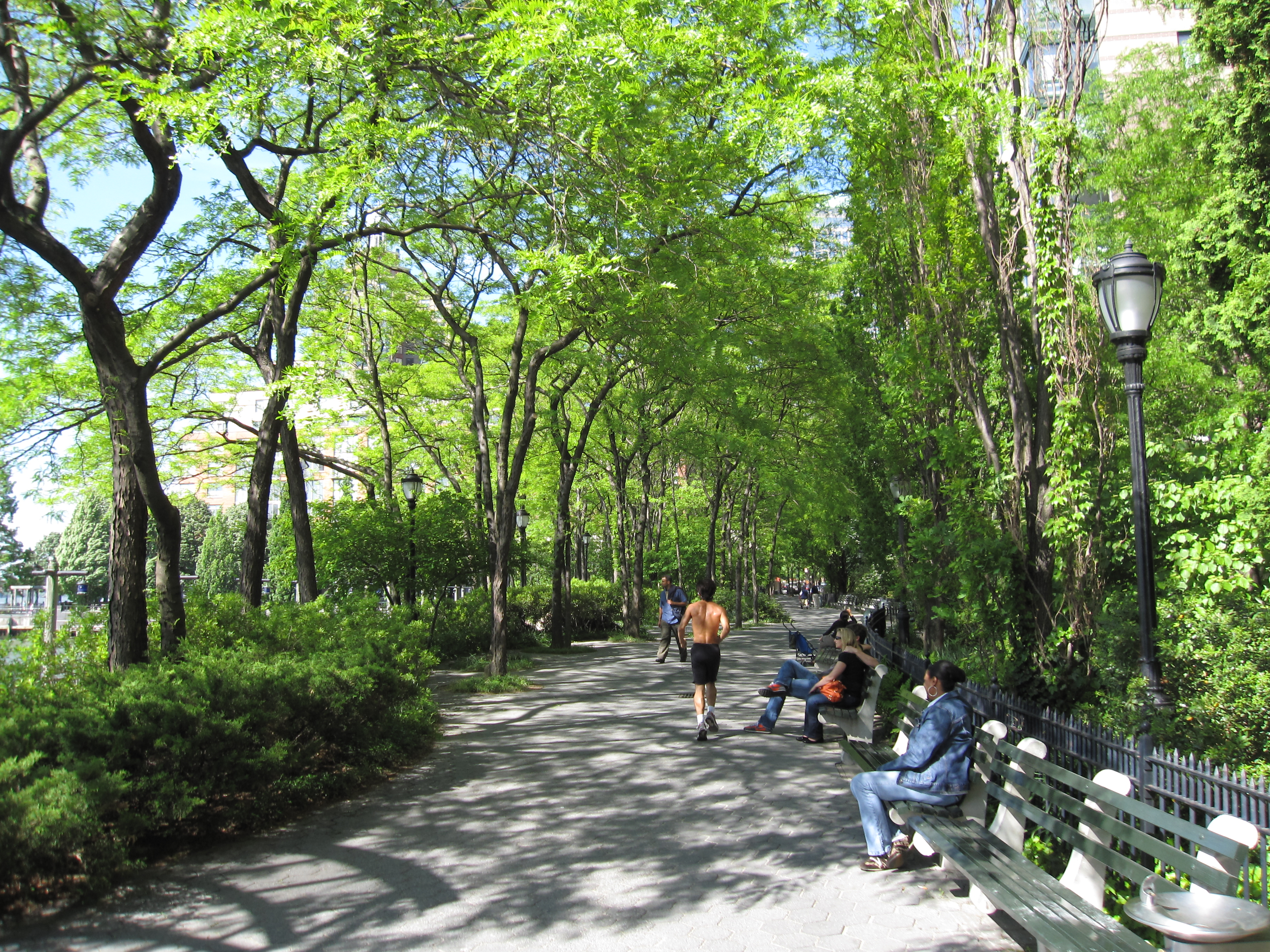
Greenery at South Cove

Battery Park City is bounded on the east by West Street, which separates the area from the Financial District of Lower Manhattan. To the west, north, and south, the area is surrounded by the Hudson River. Battery Park City spans 92-acre (37 ha), with 36 acres used as parkland.

The development consists of roughly five major sections. Traveling north to south, the first neighborhood has high-rise residential buildings, the Stuyvesant High School, a Regal Entertainment Group movie theater, and the Battery Park City branch of the New York Public Library. It is also the site of the 463-suite Conrad New York luxury hotel, which has a ballroom and a conference center. Other restaurants located in that hotel, as well as a DSW store and a New York Sports Club branch, were closed in 2009 after the takeover of the property by Goldman Sachs. Former undeveloped lots in the area have been developed into high-rise buildings; for example, Goldman Sachs built a new headquarters at 200 West Street.

Nearby is Brookfield Place, a complex of several commercial buildings formerly known as the World Financial Center.

Current residential neighborhoods of Battery Park City are divided into northern and southern sections, separated by Brookfield Place. The northern section consists entirely of large, 20–45-story buildings, all various shades of orange brick. The southern section, extending down from the Winter Garden, which is located in Brookfield Place, contains residential apartment buildings such as Gateway Plaza and the Rector Place apartment buildings. In this section lies the majority of Battery Park City's residential areas, in three sections: Gateway Plaza, a high-rise building complex; the "Rector Place Residential Neighborhood"; and the" Battery Place Residential Neighborhood". These subsections contain most of the area's residential buildings, along with park space, supermarkets, restaurants, and movie theaters. Construction of residential buildings began north of the World Financial Center in the late 1990s, and completion of the final lots took place in early 2011. Additionally, a park restoration was completed in 2013.

== History ==
=== Site and formation ===
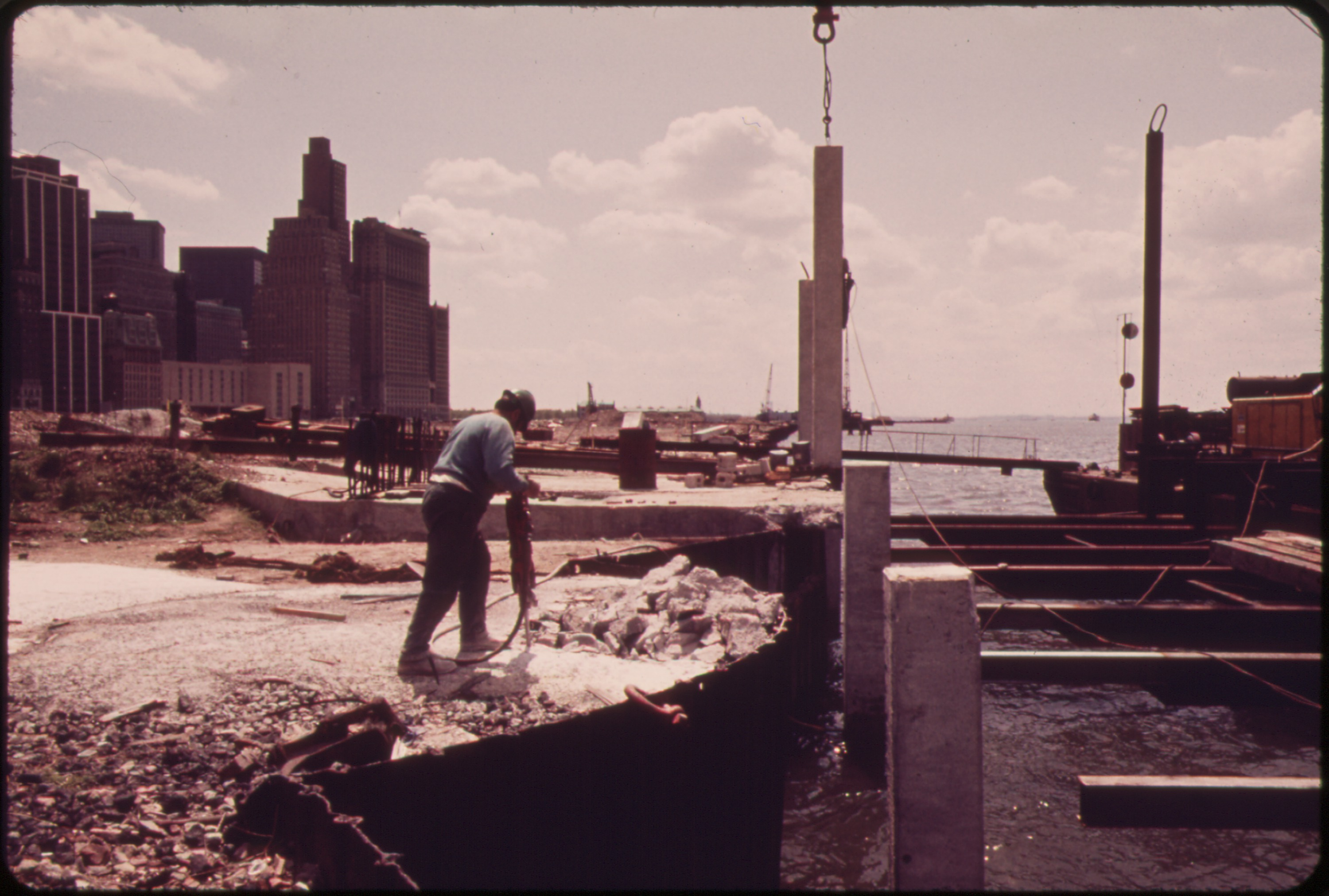
Construction in May 1973

Throughout the 19th century and early-20th century, the area adjoining today's Battery Park City was known as Little Syria with Lebanese, Greeks, Armenians, and other ethnic groups. In 1929, the land was the proposed site of a $50 million (equivalent to $940 million in 2025) residential development that would have served workers in the Wall Street area. The Battery Tower project was left unfinished after workers digging the foundation ran into forty feet of old bulkheads, sunken docks, and ships.

By the late-1950s, the once-prosperous port area of downtown Manhattan was occupied by a number of dilapidated shipping piers, casualties of the rise of container shipping which drove sea traffic to Port Elizabeth, New Jersey. The initial proposal to reclaim this area through landfill was offered in the early-1960s by private firms and supported by the mayor, part of a long history of Lower Manhattan expansion. That plan became complicated when Governor Nelson Rockefeller announced his desire to redevelop a part of the area as a separate project. The various groups reached a compromise, and in 1966 the governor unveiled the proposal for what would become Battery Park City. The creation of architect Wallace K. Harrison, the proposal called for a 'comprehensive community' consisting of housing, social infrastructure and light industry.

In 1968, the New York State Legislature created the Battery Park City Authority (BPCA) to oversee development. Rockefeller named Charles J. Urstadt as the first chairman of the authority's board that year. He then served as the chief executive officer from 1973 to 1978. Urstadt later served as the authority's vice chair from 1996 to 2010. The New York State Urban Development Corporation and ten other public agencies were also involved in the development project. For the next several years, the BPCA made slow progress. In April 1969, it unveiled a master plan for the area, which was approved in October. In early-1972, the BPCA issued $200 million in bonds to fund construction efforts, with Harry B. Helmsley designated as the developer. That same year, the city approved plans to alter the number of apartments designated for lower, middle and upper income renters. Urstadt said the changes were needed to make the financing for the project viable. In addition to the change in the mix of units, the city approved adding nine acres, which extended the northern boundary from Reade Street to Duane Street.

Landfill material from construction of the World Trade Center and other buildings in Lower Manhattan was used to add fill for the southern portion. Cellular cofferdams were constructed to retain the material. After removal of the piers, wooden piles and overburden of silt, the northern portion (north of, and including the marina) was filled with sand dredged from areas adjacent to Ambrose Channel in the Atlantic Ocean, as well as stone from the construction of Water Tunnel #3. By 1976, the landfill was completed. Seating stands for viewing the American Bicentennial "Operation Sail" flotilla parade were set up on the completed landfill in July 1976. Construction efforts ground to a halt in 1977, as a result of the city's fiscal crisis. That year, the presidential administration of Jimmy Carter approved mortgage insurance for 1,600 of the development's proposed units. In 1979, the title to the landfill was transferred from the city to the Battery Park City Authority, which financially restructured itself and created a new, more viable master plan, designed by Alex Cooper of Cooper, Robertson & Partners and Stanton Eckstut. By that time, only two of the proposed development's buildings had been built, and the $200 million bond issue was supposed to have been paid off the next year.

The design of BPC to some degree reflects the values of vibrant city neighborhoods championed by Jane Jacobs. The Urban Land Institute (ULI) awarded the Battery Park City Master Plan its 2010 Heritage Award, for having "facilitated the private development of 9.3 million square feet (860 thousand square meters) of commercial space, 7.2 million square feet (670 thousand square meters) of residential space, and nearly 36 acres (15 ha) of open space in lower Manhattan, becoming a model for successful large-scale planning efforts and marking a positive shift away from the urban renewal mindset of the time."

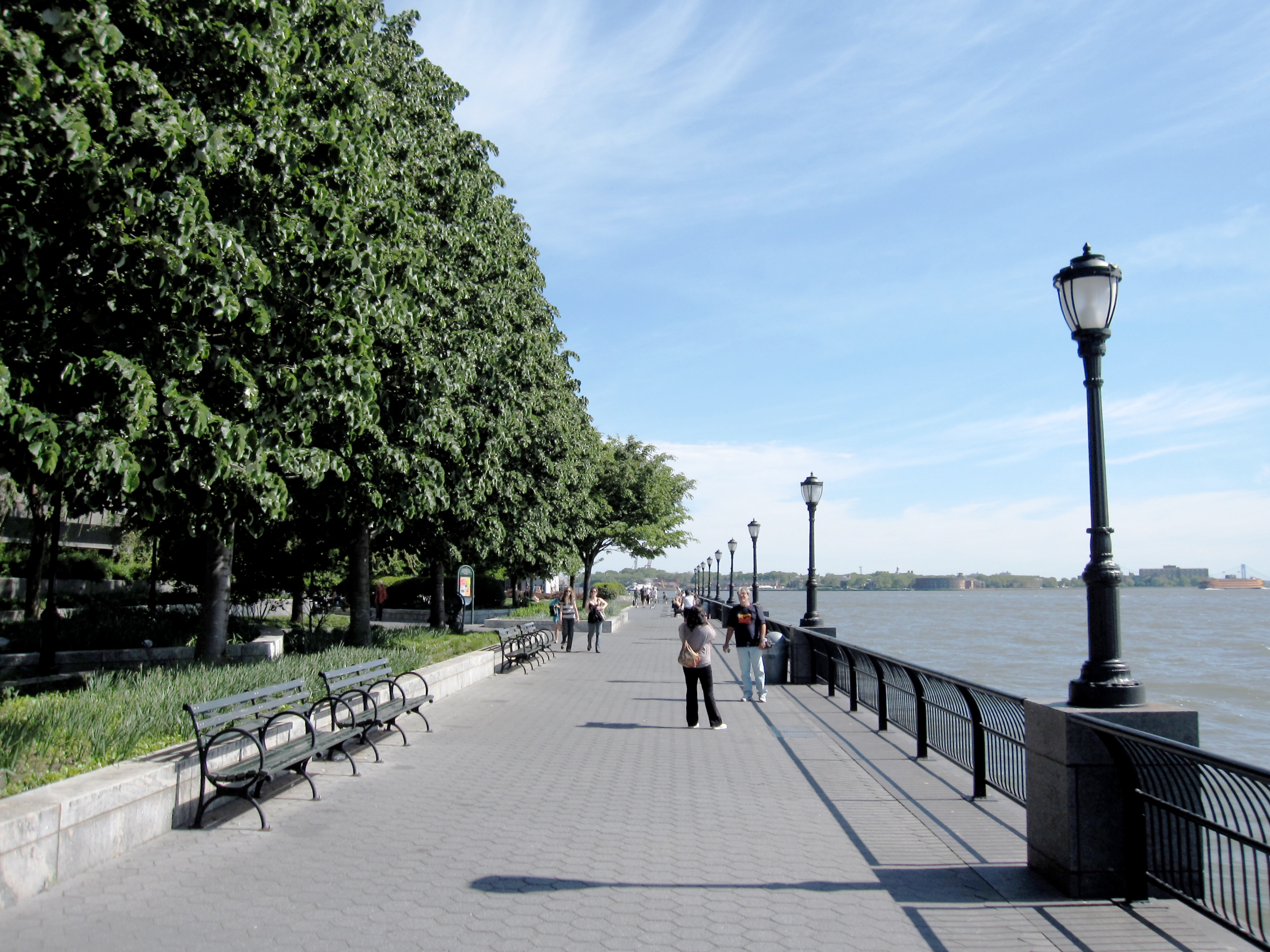
The esplanade

=== Construction and early development ===
During the late-1970s and early-1980s, the site hosted Creative Time's landmark Art on the Beach sculpture exhibitions. On September 23, 1979, the landfill was the site of an anti-nuclear rally attended by 200,000 people.

In 1978, a temporary heliport operated by the Port Authority of New York and New Jersey opened at the southern end of the landfill and was initially used by New York Airways helicopters providing scheduled service to Kennedy, LaGuardia and Newark airports. The helicopter landing pad later accommodated flights diverted from the Downtown Manhattan Heliport while that facility was closed for reconstruction from 1983 to 1987. The Battery Park City Heliport was located on the south side of the future site of the Museum of Jewish Heritage.

Construction began on the first residential building in June 1980. In April 1981, the New York State Urban Development Corporation (now the Empire State Development Corporation) issued a request for proposal, ultimately selecting six real-estate companies to develop over 1,800 residential units. The same year, the World Financial Center started construction; Olympia and York of Toronto was named as the developer for the World Financial Center, who then hired Cesar Pelli as the lead architect. By 1985, construction was completed and the World Financial Center (later renamed Brookfield Place New York) saw its first tenants. The newly completed development was lauded by The New York Times as "a triumph of urban design", with the World Financial Center being deemed "a symbol of change".

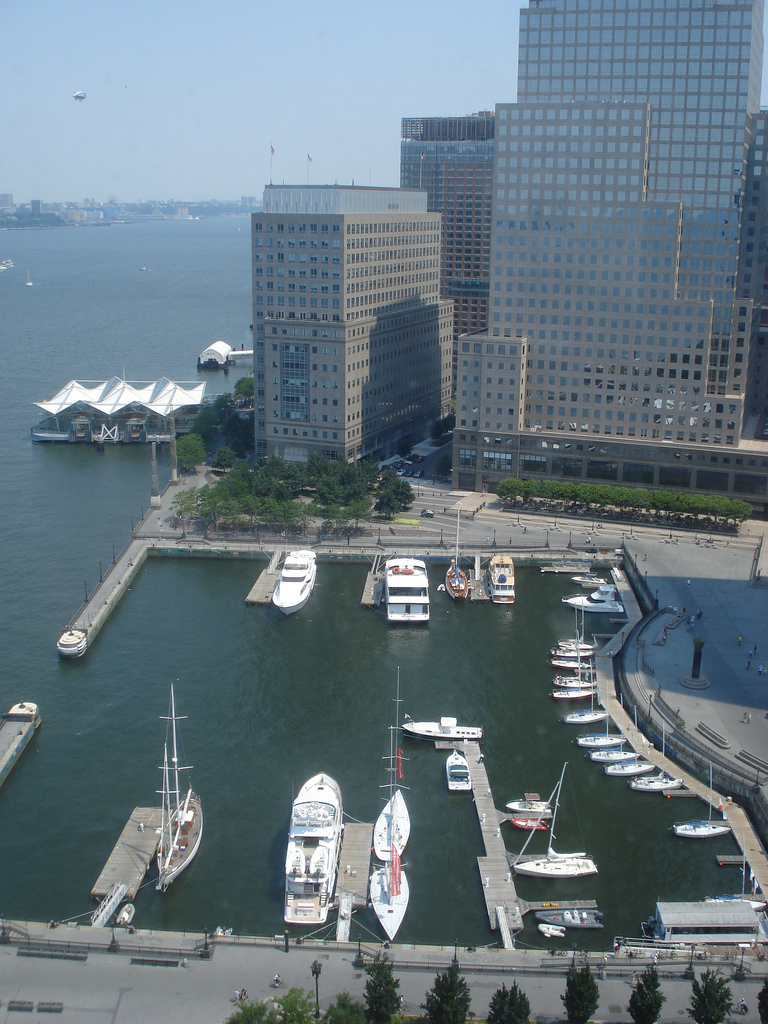
North Cove Yacht Harbor, next to the World Financial Center

During early construction, two acres of land in the southern section of the Battery Park landfill was used by artist Agnes Denes to plant wheat in an exhibition titled Wheatfield – A Confrontation. The project was a visual contradiction: a golden field of wheat set among the steel skyscrapers of downtown Manhattan. It was created during a six-month period in the spring, summer, and fall of 1982 when Denes, with the support of the Public Art Fund, planted the field of wheat on rubble-strewn land near Wall Street and the World Trade Center site. Denes stated that her "decision to plant a wheatfield in Manhattan, instead of designing just another public sculpture, grew out of a long-standing concern and need to call attention to our misplaced priorities and deteriorating human values."

Throughout the 1980s, the BPCA oversaw a great deal of construction, including the entire Rector Place neighborhood and the river esplanade. It was during that period that Amanda Burden, later City Planning Department Director in the Bloomberg administration, worked on Battery Park City. During the 1980s, a total of 13 buildings were constructed. The Vietnam Veterans Plaza was established by Edward I. Koch in 1985. Constructed at a cost of $150 million (equivalent to $340 million in 2025) and with a capacity for 2,700 students, Battery Park City became the new home of the Stuyvesant High School in 1992. During the 1990s, an additional six buildings were added to the neighborhood. By the turn of the 21st century, Battery Park City was mostly completed, with the exception of some ongoing construction on West Street.

Initially, in the 1980s, 23 buildings were built in the area. By the 1990s, 9 more buildings were built, followed by the construction of 11 buildings in the 2000s and 3 buildings in the 2010s. The Battery Park City Authority, wishing to attract more middle-class residents, started providing subsidies in 1998 to households whose annual incomes were $108,000 or less. By the end of the decade, nearly the entire landfill had been developed.

=== Early 21st century ===
The September 11 terrorist attacks in 2001 had a major impact on Battery Park City. The residents of Lower Manhattan and particularly of Battery Park City were displaced for an extended period of time. Parts of the community were an official crime scene and therefore residents were unable to return to live or even collect property. Many of the displaced residents were not allowed to return to the area for months and none were given government guidance of where to live temporarily on the already-crowded island of Manhattan. With most hotel rooms booked, residents, including young children and the elderly, were forced to fend for themselves. When they were finally allowed to return to Battery Park City, some found that their homes had been looted.

Upon residents' return, the air in the area was still filled with toxic smoke from the World Trade Center fires that persisted until December 2001. More than half of the area's residents moved away permanently from the community after the adjacent World Trade Center towers collapsed and spread toxic dust, debris, and smoke. Gateway Plaza's 600 building, Hudson View East, and Parc Place (now Rector Square) were punctured by airplane parts. The Winter Garden and other portions of the World Financial Center were severely damaged. Environmental concerns regarding dust from the World Trade Center are a continuing source of concern for many residents, scientists, and elected officials. Since the attacks, the damage has been repaired. Temporarily reduced rents and government subsidies helped restore residential occupancy in the years following the attacks.

After September 11, 2001, residents of Battery Park City and Tribeca formed the TriBattery Pops Tom Goodkind Conductor in response to the events of the attacks. The "Pops" have been Grammy-nominated and are the first lower Manhattan all-volunteer community band in a century.

Since then, real estate development in the area has continued robustly. Commercial development includes the 2,100,000-square-foot (200,000 m^{2}) 200 West Street, the Goldman Sachs global headquarters, which began construction in 2005 and opened for occupancy in October 2009. 200 West Street received in 2010 gold-level certification under the United States Green Building Council's Leadership in Energy and Environmental Design (LEED) program by incorporating various water and energy conservation features.

On October 29, 2012, Hurricane Sandy flooded sections of Battery Park City, including the ball fields and areas along West Street, as well as extensive flooding in the adjacent Financial District and South Street Seaport areas. In the aftermath, New York City and the Battery Park City Authority began plans for the Lower Manhattan Coastal Resiliency project, which aims to implement measures to protect Lower Manhattan from storm surge, sea-level rise, and other climate change risks. The project includes the South Battery Park City Resiliency Project, which involved reconstructing Wagner Park in 2023-2025. It also includes the Northwest Battery Park City Resiliency Project which is slated to begin in 2026 and be completed in 2031. The project involves reconstructing the North Cove and south Battery Park Esplanade, as well as installing flood barriers around the perimeter of the South Cove and Rockefeller Park and along the north side of Stuyvesant High School.

== Ownership and maintenance ==
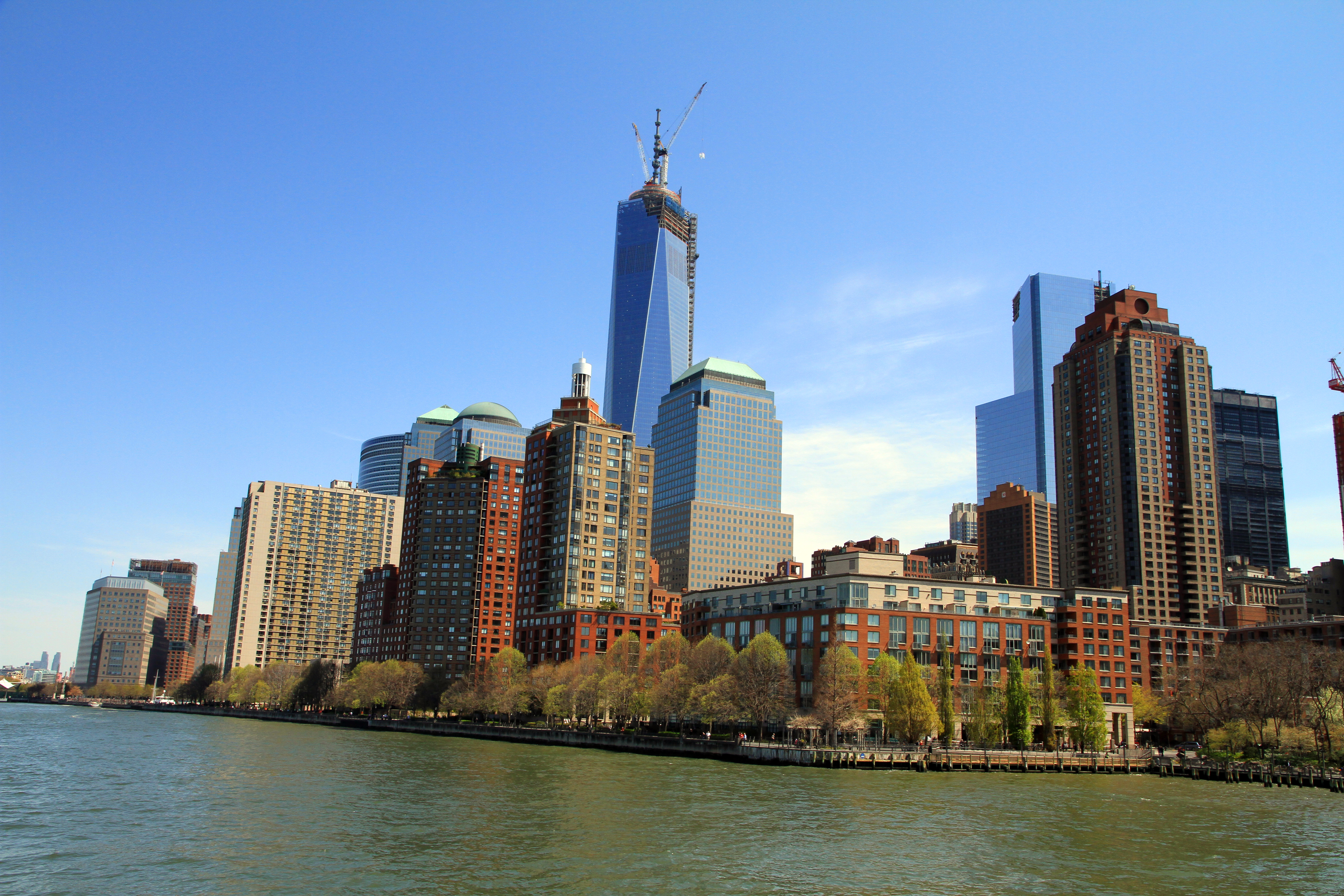
View from Hudson River in 2013 with One World Trade Center under construction

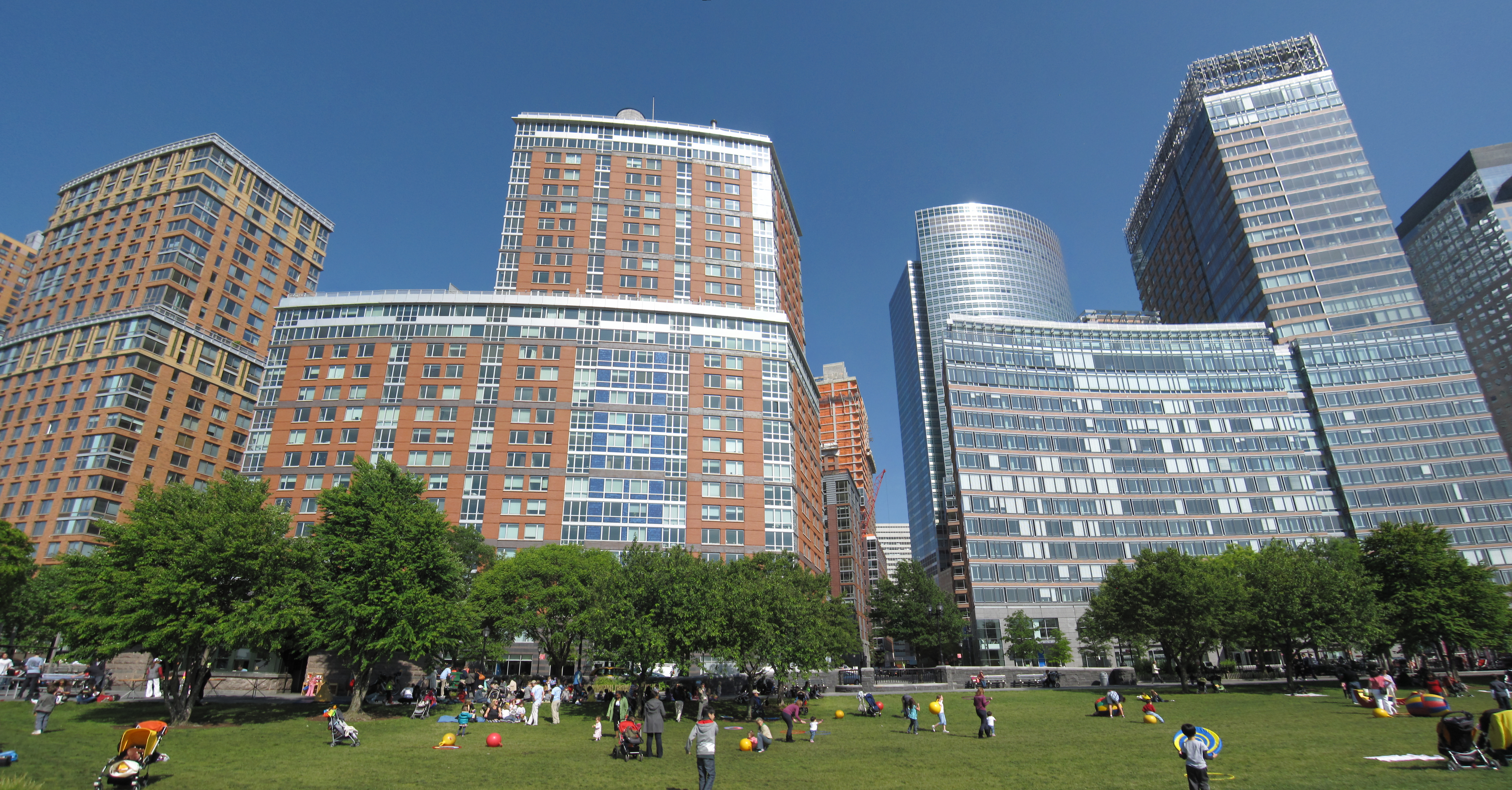
Northern part of Battery Park City; The Solaire (left) is seen, from the Nelson A. Rockefeller Park.

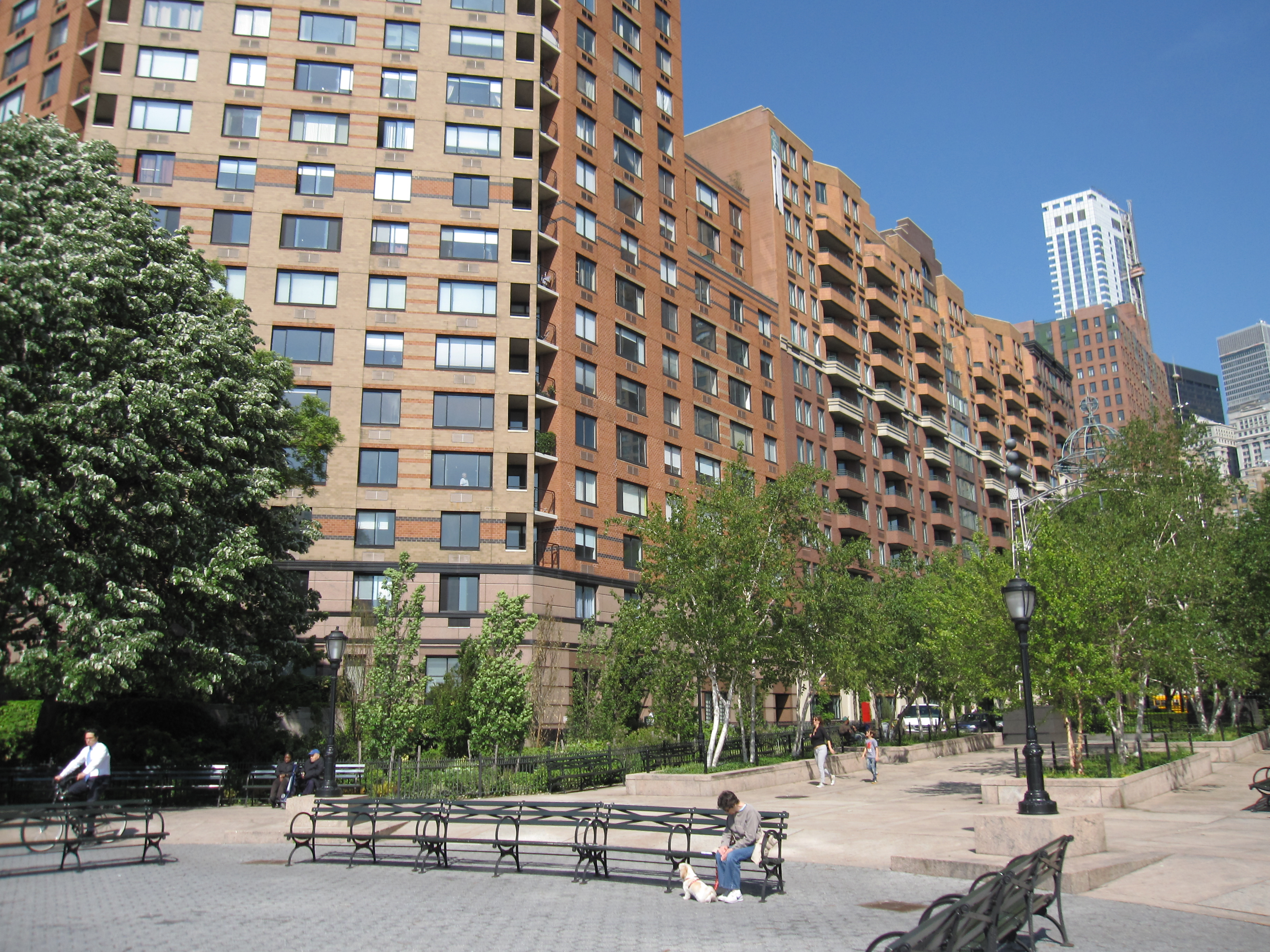
Liberty House

Battery Park City is owned and managed by the Hugh L. Carey Battery Park City Authority (BPCA), a Class A New York State public-benefit corporation created by New York State in 1968 to redevelop outmoded and deteriorated piers. The project involved reclaiming the land, replanning the area and facilitating new construction of a mixed commercial and residential community. It has operated under the authority of the Urban Development Corporation. Its mission is "to plan, create, coordinate and sustain a balanced community of commercial, residential, retail, and park space within its designated 92-acre site on the lower west side of Manhattan".

The Battery Park City Authority's board is composed of seven uncompensated members who are appointed by the governor and who serve six-year terms. Raju Mann has been the president and chief executive officer since 2023. The BPCA is invested with substantial powers: it can acquire, hold and dispose of real property, enter into lease agreements, borrow money and issue debt, and manage the project. Like other public benefit corporations, the BPCA is exempt from property taxes and has the ability to issue tax exempt bonds. In 2021, the BPCA has operating expenses of $69.1 million as well as an outstanding debt of $875.09 million, and it employed 200 people.

Under the 1989 agreement between the BPCA and the City of New York, $600 million was transferred by the BPCA to the city. Charles J. Urstadt, the first chairman and CEO of the BPCA, noted in an August 19, 2007, op-ed piece in the New York Post that the aggregate figure of funds transferred to the City of New York is above $1.4 billion, with the BPCA continuing to contribute $200 million a year. The Independent Budget Office of the City of New York also recommended the city take over Battery Park City in a report published in February 2020. The report echoed Urstadt's proposal as a way to increase revenue to the city. An article published by The Broadsheet Daily described the complex shared ownership structure of Battery Park City between the city and state that was set up by Urstadt.

Excess revenue from the area was to be contributed to other housing efforts, typically low-income projects in the Bronx and Harlem. Much of this funding has historically been diverted to general city expenses, under section 3.d of the 1989 agreement. However, in July 2006, Mayor Michael Bloomberg, Governor George Pataki, and Comptroller William C. Thompson Jr. announced the final approval for the New York City Housing Trust Fund derived from $130 million in Battery Park City revenues. The fund aimed to preserve or create 4,300 units of low- and moderate-income housing by 2009. It also provided seed financing for the New York Acquisition Fund, a $230 million initiative that aims to serve as a catalyst for the construction and preservation of more than 30,000 units of affordable housing citywide by 2016. The Acquisition Fund has since established itself as a model for similar funds in cities and states across the country.

By 2018, thirty residential buildings had been built in Battery Park City and no new construction was planned. The Battery Park City Authority's main focus turned to maintenance of existing infrastructure, security and conservancy of the public spaces. The authority was creating over 1,000 free activities per year.

Condo owners in Battery Park City pay higher monthly charges than owners of comparable apartments elsewhere in New York City because residents pay their building's common charges in addition to PILOT (payment in lieu of taxes). The PILOT payments replace real estate taxes and the land lease. The cumulative effect is lower property values for homeowners.

Because none of the properties in Battery Park City own the land they are built on, many banks have refused to write loans when those ground leases are periodically up for renewal. This has been a regular source of anger and frustration for owners in Battery Park City who are looking to sell.

== Demographics ==
For census purposes, the New York City government classifies Battery Park City as part of a larger neighborhood tabulation area called Battery Park City-Lower Manhattan. Based on data from the 2010 United States census, the population of Battery Park City-Lower Manhattan was 39,699, an increase of 19,611 (97.6%) from the 20,088 counted in 2000. Covering an area of 479.77 acres (194.16 ha), the neighborhood had a population density of 82.7 inhabitants per acre (52,900/sq mi; 20,400/km^{2}). The racial makeup of the neighborhood was 65.4% (25,965) White, 3.2% (1,288) African American, 0.1% (35) Native American, 20.2% (8,016) Asian, 0.0% (17) Pacific Islander, 0.4% (153) from other races, and 3.0% (1,170) from two or more races. Hispanic or Latino of any race were 7.7% (3,055) of the population.

The entirety of Community District 1, which comprises Battery Park City and other Lower Manhattan neighborhoods, had 63,383 inhabitants as of NYC Health's 2018 Community Health Profile, with an average life expectancy of 85.8 years. This is higher than the median life expectancy of 81.2 for all New York City neighborhoods. Most inhabitants are young to middle-aged adults: half (50%) are between the ages of 25 and 44, while 14% are between 0 and 17, and 18% between 45 and 64. The ratio of college-aged and elderly residents was lower, at 11% and 7% respectively.

As of 2017, the median household income in Community Districts 1 and 2 (including Greenwich Village and SoHo) was $144,878, though the median income in Battery Park City individually was $126,771. In 2018, an estimated 9% of Battery Park City and Lower Manhattan residents lived in poverty, compared to 14% in all of Manhattan and 20% in all of New York City. One in twenty-five residents (4%) were unemployed, compared to 7% in Manhattan and 9% in New York City. Rent burden, or the percentage of residents who have difficulty paying their rent, is 38% in Battery Park City and Lower Manhattan, compared to the boroughwide and citywide rates of 45% and 51% respectively. Based on this calculation, as of 2018, Battery Park City and Lower Manhattan are considered high-income relative to the rest of the city and not gentrifying.

As of 2007, about 10,000 people live in Battery Park City, most of whom are upper middle class and upper class (54.0% of households have incomes over $100,000). When fully built out, the neighborhood is projected to have 14,000 residents.

=== Census ===
Based on the 2020 census, the racial makeup of Northern Battery Park City (10282) was 66% White, 2% Black, 0% Native American, 16% Asian, 0% Islander, 0% from other races, and 5% from two or more races. Hispanic of Latino of any race were 11% of the population. The racial makeup of South Battery Park City (10280) was 69% White, 1% Black, 0% Native, 17% Asian, 0% Islander, 0% from other races, 3% from two or more races, and 11% Hispanic.

As of 2020, the population of the area was 16,169.

== Buildings ==
=== Residential ===
The first residential building in Battery Park City, Gateway Plaza, was completed in 1983. As of 2010, the population of the area was 13,386. Some of the more prominent residential buildings include:

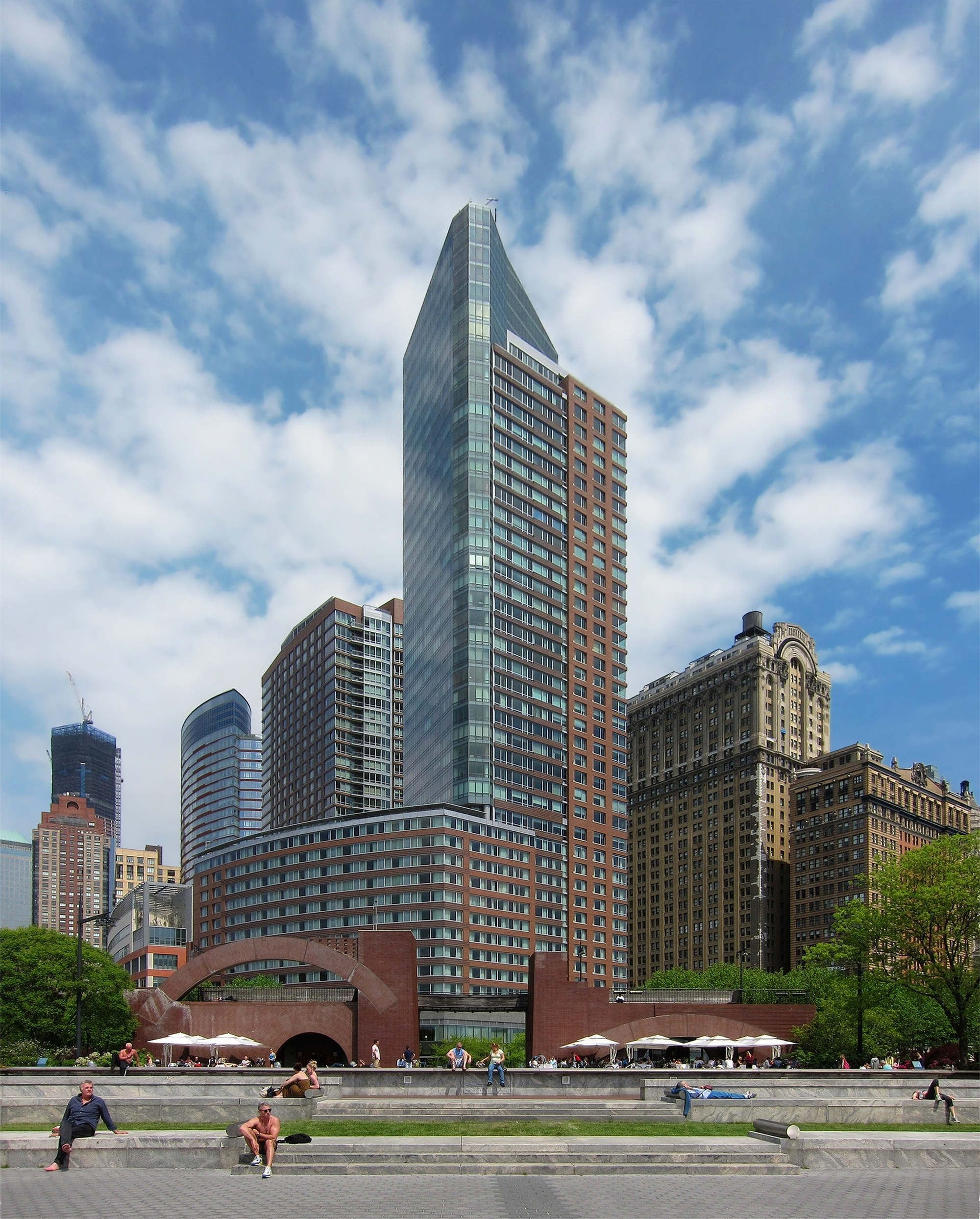
Southern part of Battery Park City; Millennium Point is shown.

- Millennium Point, a 449-foot (137 m), 38-story skyscraper built from 1999 to 2001. It occupies the street addresses 25–39 Battery Place. However, due to the September 11 attacks which hit the nearby World Trade Center, opening of Millennium Point was delayed until January 2002. The building won the 2001 Silver Emporis Skyscraper Award. The tower section contains 113 luxury condominiums. The wider, lower 12 floors are occupied by a 5-star hotel, The Wagner at the Battery (formerly the Ritz-Carlton Battery Park). The hotel has 298 rooms, including 44 suites, with the largest suite spanning 200 square metres (2,150 sq ft) in area. The Skyscraper Museum occupies a small space on the first floor of the building. A restaurant is located on the 14th floor.
- The Solaire, the first green residential building in the United States, as well as the first residential high-rise building in New York City to be certified by the U.S. Green Building Council. It was designed by Pelli Clarke Pelli and completed in 2003. The Solaire is located at 20 River Terrace. The developer received funding from the State of New York, which was somewhat controversial as the developer was only required to agree to set aside 10% of the units as "affordable housing" or "moderate income", rather than the usual 80:20 agreement. When the building opened, rents ranged from roughly $2,500 to $9,001 depending on the size of the unit. The building has been rated LEED Platinum. The energy conserving building design is 35% more energy-efficient than code requires, resulting in a 67% lower electricity demand during peak hours, resulting in, among other benefits, lower electric bills for residents. Photovoltaic panels convert sunlight to electricity, supplemented by a computerized building management system and environmentally responsible operating and maintenance practices to further reduce the building's environmental impact.

Other residential condominiums include:

- Battery Pointe, 300 Rector Place
- Cove Club, 2 South End Avenue
- Hudson Tower, 350 Albany Street
- Hudson View East, 250 South End Avenue
- Hudson View West, 300 Albany Street
- Liberty Court, 200 Rector Place
- Liberty Green, 300 North End Avenue
- Liberty House, 377 Rector Place
- Liberty Luxe, 200 North End Avenue
- Liberty Terrace, 380 Rector Place
- Liberty View, 99 Battery Place
- Millennium Tower Residences, 30 West Street
- The Regatta, 21 South End Avenue
- Ritz Carlton Residence, 10 West Street
- Riverhouse, One Rockefeller Park
- The Soundings, 280 Rector Place
- The Visionaire, 70 Little West Street
- 1 Rector Park, 333 Rector Place

Other residential apartments include:

- 212 Warren (formerly 22 River Terrace)
- Gateway Plaza, 345-395 South End Avenue
- The Hallmark, 455 North End Avenue
- Rector Square, 225 Rector Place
- River Watch, 70 Battery Place
- The Solaire, 20 River Terrace
- South Cove Plaza, 50 Battery Place
- Tribeca Bridge Tower, 450 North End Avenue
- Tribeca Green, 325 North End Avenue
- Tribeca Park, 400 Chambers Street
- Tribeca Pointe, River Terrace
- The Verdesian, 211 North End Avenue

=== Office ===
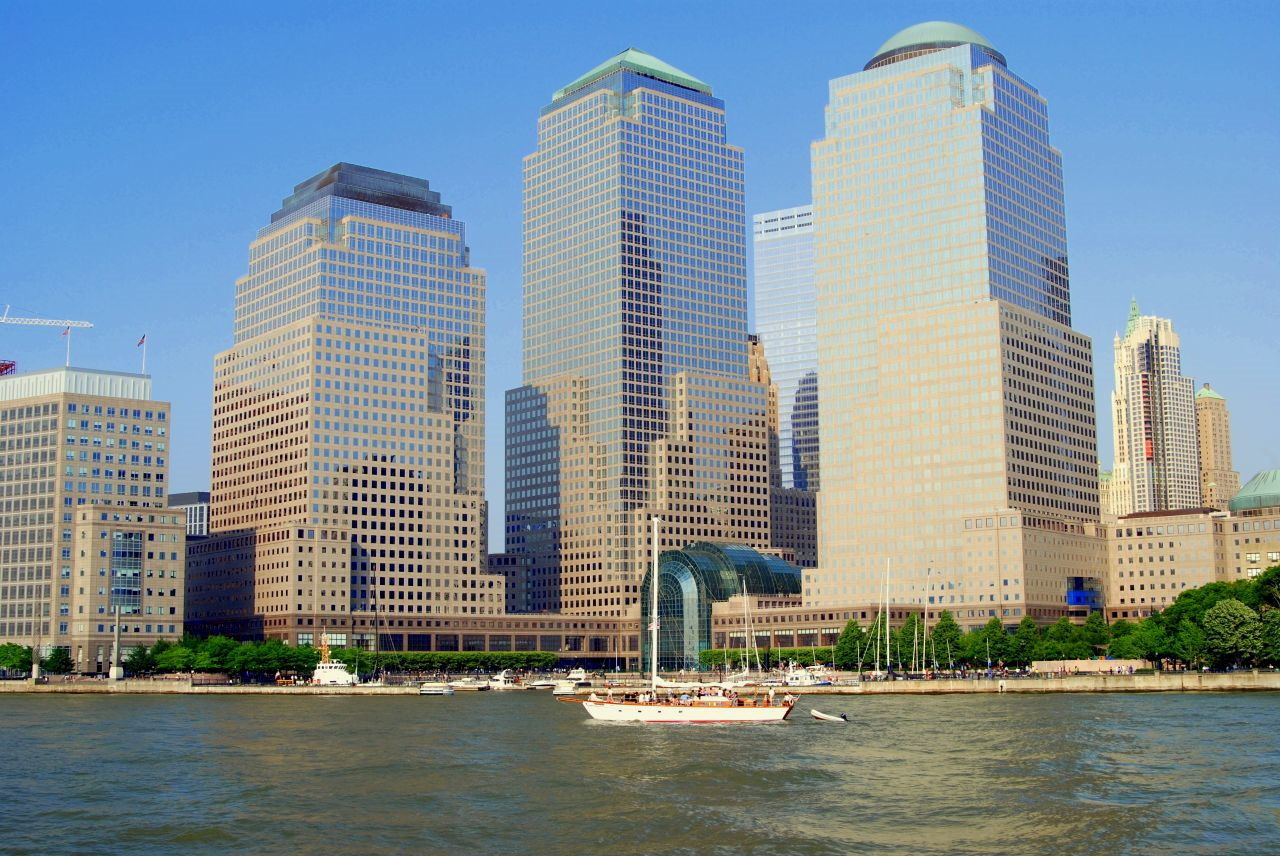
Brookfield Place as seen in 2006, when it was the World Financial Center

Battery Park City, which is mainly residential, also has a few office buildings. The seven buildings including the Brookfield Place complex, as well as 200 West Street, are the neighborhood's only office buildings.

==== Brookfield Place complex ====
Located in the middle of Battery Park City and overlooking the Hudson River, Brookfield Place, designed by César Pelli and owned mostly by Toronto-based Brookfield Properties, has been home to offices of various major companies, including Merrill Lynch, RBC Capital Markets, Nomura Group, American Express and Brookfield Asset Management, among others. Brookfield Place also serves as the United States headquarters for Brookfield Properties, which has its headquarters located in 200 Vesey Street. Brookfield Place also has its own ZIP Code, 10281.

Brookfield Place's ground floor and portions of the second floor are occupied by a mall; its center point is a steel-and-glass atrium known as the Winter Garden. Outside of the Winter Garden lies a sizeable yacht harbor on the Hudson known as North Cove.

The building's original developer was Olympia and York of Toronto, Ontario. It used to be named the World Financial Center, but in 2014, the complex was given its current name following the completion of extensive renovations. The World Financial Center complex was built by Olympia and York between 1982 and 1988; it was damaged in the September 11 attacks but later repaired. It has six constituent buildings – 200 Liberty Street, 225 Liberty Street, 200 Vesey Street, 250 Vesey Street, the Winter Garden Atrium, and One North End Avenue (a.k.a. the New York Mercantile Exchange building).

==== 200 West Street ====
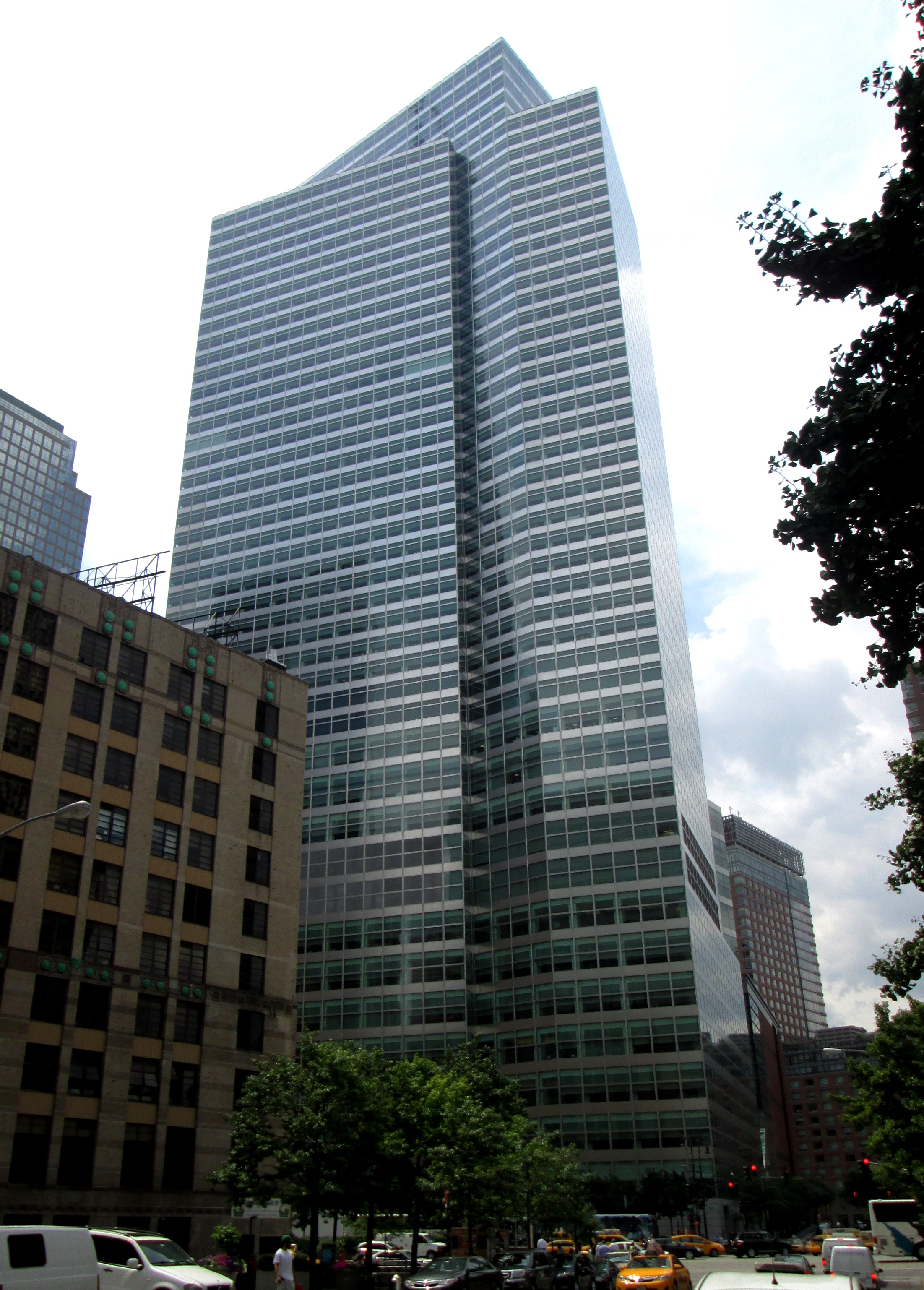
200 West Street, from Murray Street, looking west

200 West Street is the location of the global headquarters of Goldman Sachs, an investment banking firm. A 749-foot-tall (228 m), 44-story building located on the west side of West Street between Vesey and Murray Streets, it is north of Brookfield Place and the Conrad Hotels, across the street from the Verizon Building, and diagonally opposite the World Trade Center. It is distinctive for being the only office building in the northern section of Battery Park City. It started construction in 2005 and opened in 2009.

== Police and crime ==
Battery Park City and Lower Manhattan are patrolled by the 1st Precinct of the NYPD, located at 16 Ericsson Place. The 1st Precinct ranked 63rd safest out of 69 patrol areas for per-capita crime in 2010. Though the number of crimes is low compared to other NYPD precincts, the residential population is also much lower. As of 2018, with a non-fatal assault rate of 24 per 100,000 people, Battery Park City and Lower Manhattan's rate of violent crimes per capita is less than that of the city as a whole. The incarceration rate of 152 per 100,000 people is lower than that of the city as a whole.

The 1st Precinct has a lower crime rate than in the 1990s, with crimes across all categories having decreased by 86.3% between 1990 and 2018. The 1st precinct reported 2 murders, 15 rapes, 135 robberies, 121 felony assaults, 191 burglaries, 848 grand larcenies, and 68 grand larcenies auto in 2021.

== Fire safety ==
Battery Park City is served by the New York City Fire Department (FDNY)'s Engine Co. 10/Ladder Co. 10 fire station, located at 124 Liberty Street.

== Health ==
As of 2018, preterm births and births to teenage mothers are less common in Battery Park City and Lower Manhattan than in other places citywide. In Battery Park City and Lower Manhattan, there were 77 preterm births per 1,000 live births (compared to 87 per 1,000 citywide), and 2.2 teenage births per 1,000 live births (compared to 19.3 per 1,000 citywide), though the teenage birth rate is based on a small sample size. Battery Park City and Lower Manhattan have a low population of residents who are uninsured. In 2018, this population of uninsured residents was estimated to be 4%, less than the citywide rate of 12%, though this was based on a small sample size.

The concentration of fine particulate matter, the deadliest type of air pollutant, in Battery Park City and Lower Manhattan is 0.0096 milligrams per cubic metre (9.6×10^{−9} oz/ft^{3}), more than the city average. Sixteen percent of Battery Park City and Lower Manhattan residents are smokers, which is more than the city average of 14% of residents being smokers. In Battery Park City and Lower Manhattan, 4% of residents are obese, 3% are diabetic, and 15% have high blood pressure, the lowest rates in the city—compared to the citywide averages of 24%, 11%, and 28% respectively. In addition, 5% of children are obese, the lowest rate in the city, compared to the citywide average of 20%.

Ninety-six percent of residents eat some fruits and vegetables every day, which is more than the city's average of 87%. In 2018, 88% of residents described their health as "good", "very good", or "excellent", more than the city's average of 78%. For every supermarket in Battery Park City and Lower Manhattan, there are 6 bodegas.

The nearest major hospital is NewYork-Presbyterian Lower Manhattan Hospital in the Civic Center area.

== Post office and ZIP Codes ==
Battery Park City is located within two ZIP Codes. The neighborhood north of Brookfield Place is covered by 10282, while much of the neighborhood south of Brookfield Place is covered by 10280. Brookfield Place is part of 10281, and the southernmost tip is part of 10004. The United States Postal Service does not operate any post offices in Battery Park City. The nearest post office is the Church Street Station at 90 Church Street in the Financial District.

== Education ==
Battery Park City and Lower Manhattan generally have a higher rate of college-educated residents than the rest of the city as of 2018. The vast majority of residents age 25 and older (84%) have a college education or higher, while 4% have less than a high school education and 12% are high school graduates or have some college education. By contrast, 64% of Manhattan residents and 43% of city residents have a college education or higher. The percentage of Battery Park City and Lower Manhattan students excelling in math rose from 61% in 2000 to 80% in 2011, and reading achievement increased from 66% to 68% during the same time period.

Battery Park City and Lower Manhattan's rate of elementary school student absenteeism is lower than the rest of New York City. In Battery Park City and Lower Manhattan, 6% of elementary school students missed twenty or more days per school year, less than the citywide average of 20%. Additionally, 96% of high school students in Battery Park City and Lower Manhattan graduate on time, more than the citywide average of 75%.

=== Schools ===
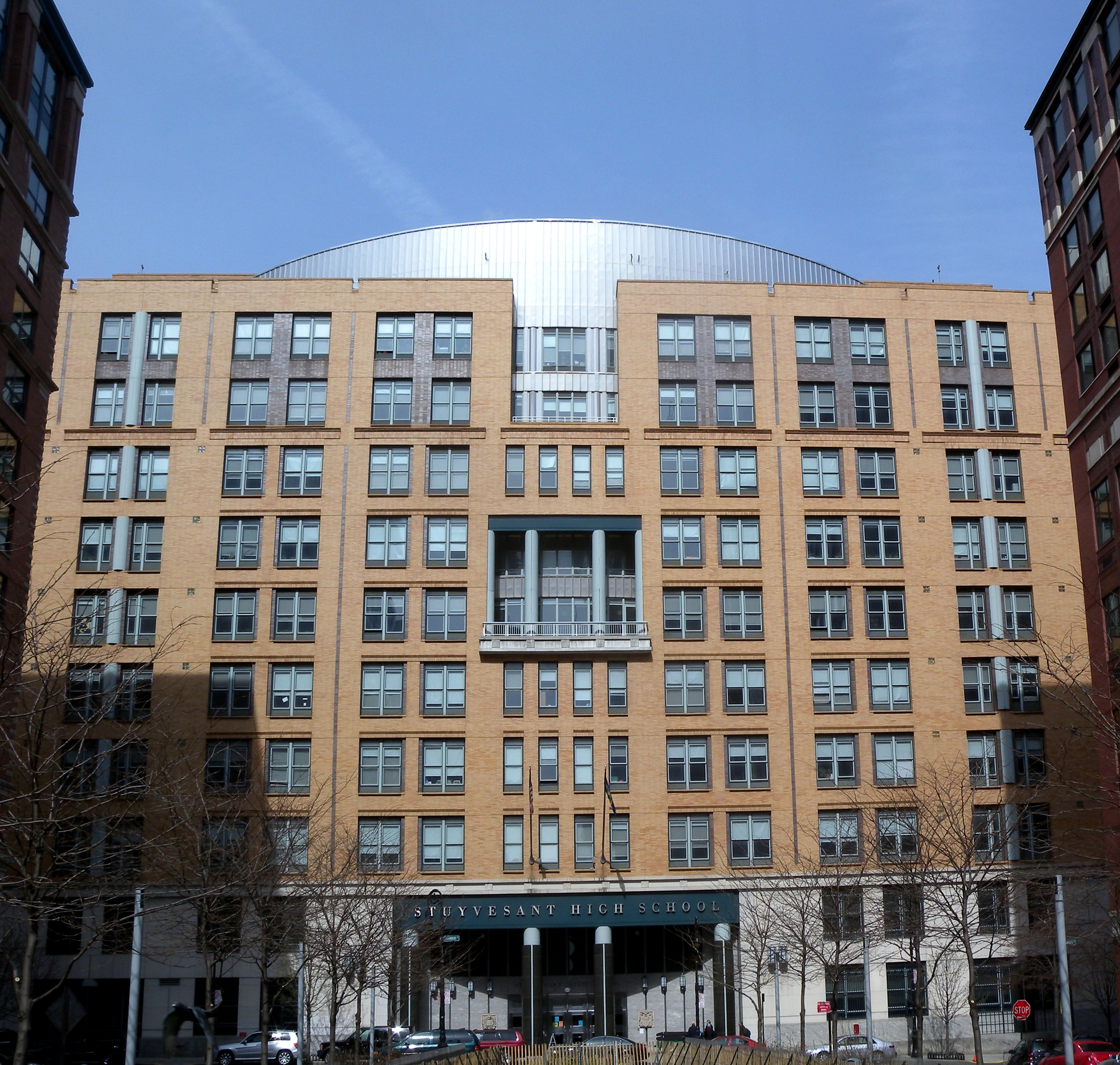
Stuyvesant High School from North End Avenue

The New York City Department of Education operates the following public schools in Battery Park City:

- P.S. 89
- I.S. 289
- P.S./I.S. 276 Battery Park City School
- Stuyvesant High School, which moved into a new waterfront building in Battery Park City in 1992
- P.S. M094
- P226M

=== Library ===
Battery Park City has a New York Public Library branch at 175 North End Avenue, designed by 1100 Architect and completed in 2010. A 10,000-square-foot (930-square-metre), two-story library on the street level of a high-rise residential building, it utilizes several sustainable design features, earning it LEED Gold certification.

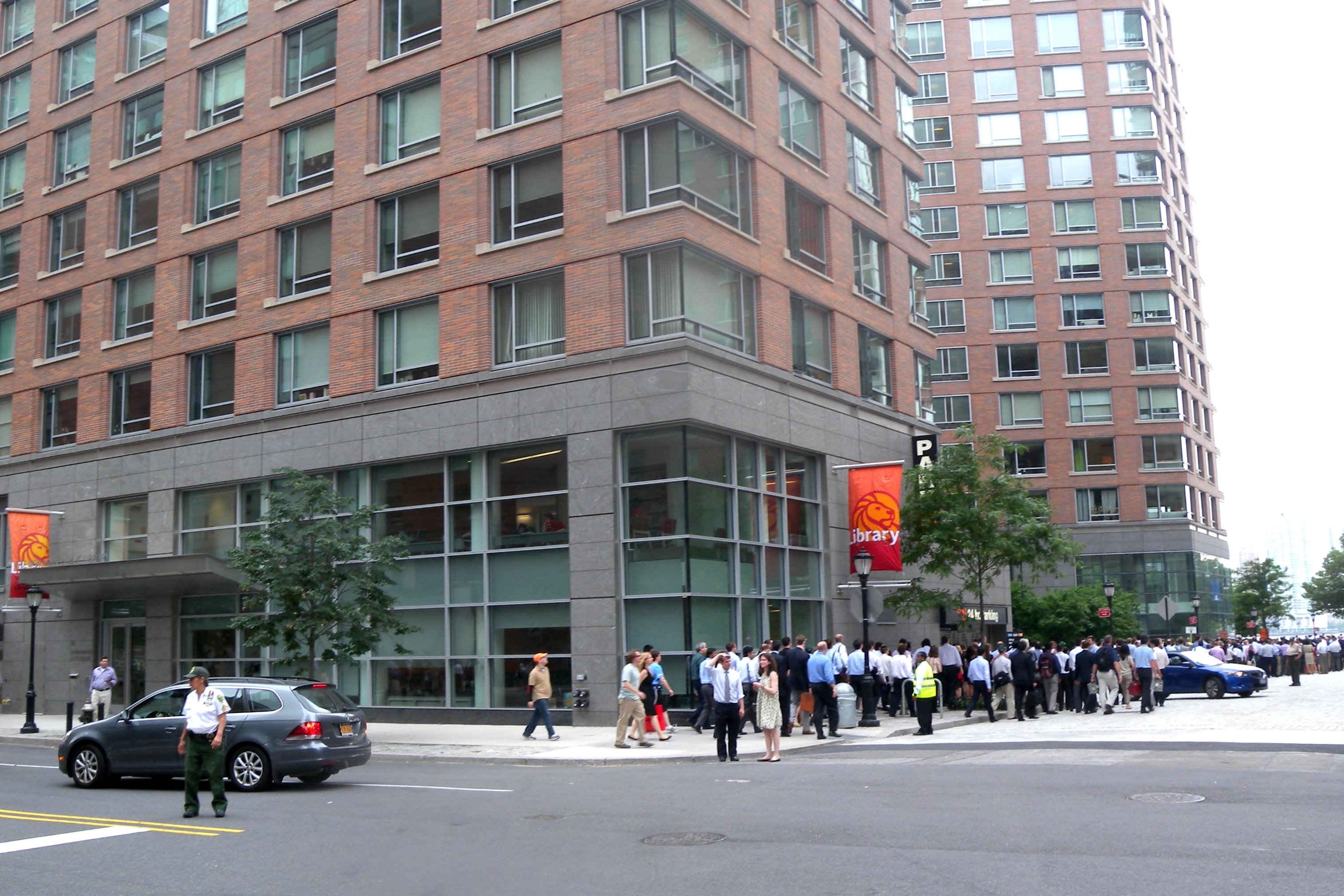
The New York Public Library branch

Sustainability was a driving factor in the design of the library including use of an energy-efficient lighting system, maximization of natural lighting, and use of recycled materials. 1100 Architect, in collaboration with Atelier Ten, an international team of environmental design consultants and building services engineers, designed the library's energy-efficient lighting system. The open plan layout and large use of glass allow for ample natural daylight year-round and low-energy LED light illuminates communal spaces. Recycled materials are incorporated into the design including carpet made from re-purposed truck tires, floors made from reclaimed window frame wood, and furniture made from FSC-certified plywood and recycled steel. Design features include a seemingly "floating" origami-style ceiling made up of triangular panels hung at varying angles and a padded reading nook fitted into the library's terrazzo-finished steel and concrete staircase. The interior uses an easy-to-navigate layout with its three distinct spatial areas of entry area, first floor space, and mezzanine visually unified through the ceiling.

The building also won the Interior Design, Best of Year Merit Award in 2011, followed by The National Terrazzo and Mosaic Association, Port Morris Tile and Marble Corporation Craftsmanship Award in 2011 and the Contract, Public Space Interiors Award in 2012.

== Transportation ==
The Metropolitan Transportation Authority provides bus service to Battery Park City, including the M9, M20 and M22 bus lines. Additionally, the Downtown Alliance operates the Downtown Connection, a free bus service that runs through Battery Park City, along North End Avenue and South End Avenue, and connects the neighborhood to New York City Hall, the Staten Island Ferry and the South Street Seaport.

There is currently no New York City Subway access in Battery Park City proper; however, the West Street pedestrian bridges, as well as crosswalks across West Street, connect Battery Park City to subway stations and the PATH station in the nearby Financial District. The West Concourse, a tunnel from Brookfield Place passing under West Street, also provides access from Battery Park City to the World Trade Center PATH station, the WTC Cortlandt station, and the Fulton Street station (New York City Subway).

The Battery Park City Ferry Terminal is at the foot of Vesey Street opposite the New York Mercantile Exchange and provides ferry transportation to various points in New Jersey via NY Waterway, Seastreak, and Liberty Water Taxi routes. NYC Ferry's St. George route, to West Midtown Ferry Terminal and St. George Terminal, stops at Battery Park City Ferry Terminal.

The West Thames Street Bridge, one of the West Street pedestrian bridges connecting Battery Park City to the Financial District, was completed in 2019, replacing the older Rector Street Bridge. On June 11, 2021, it was dedicated as the Robert F. Douglass Bridge. Its namesake, who died in 2016, was an early advocate for lower Manhattan as a senior advisor to Governor Nelson Rockefeller and later as a founding member and chairman of the Downtown Alliance and board member of the Lower Manhattan Development Corporation.

== Parks and open spaces ==
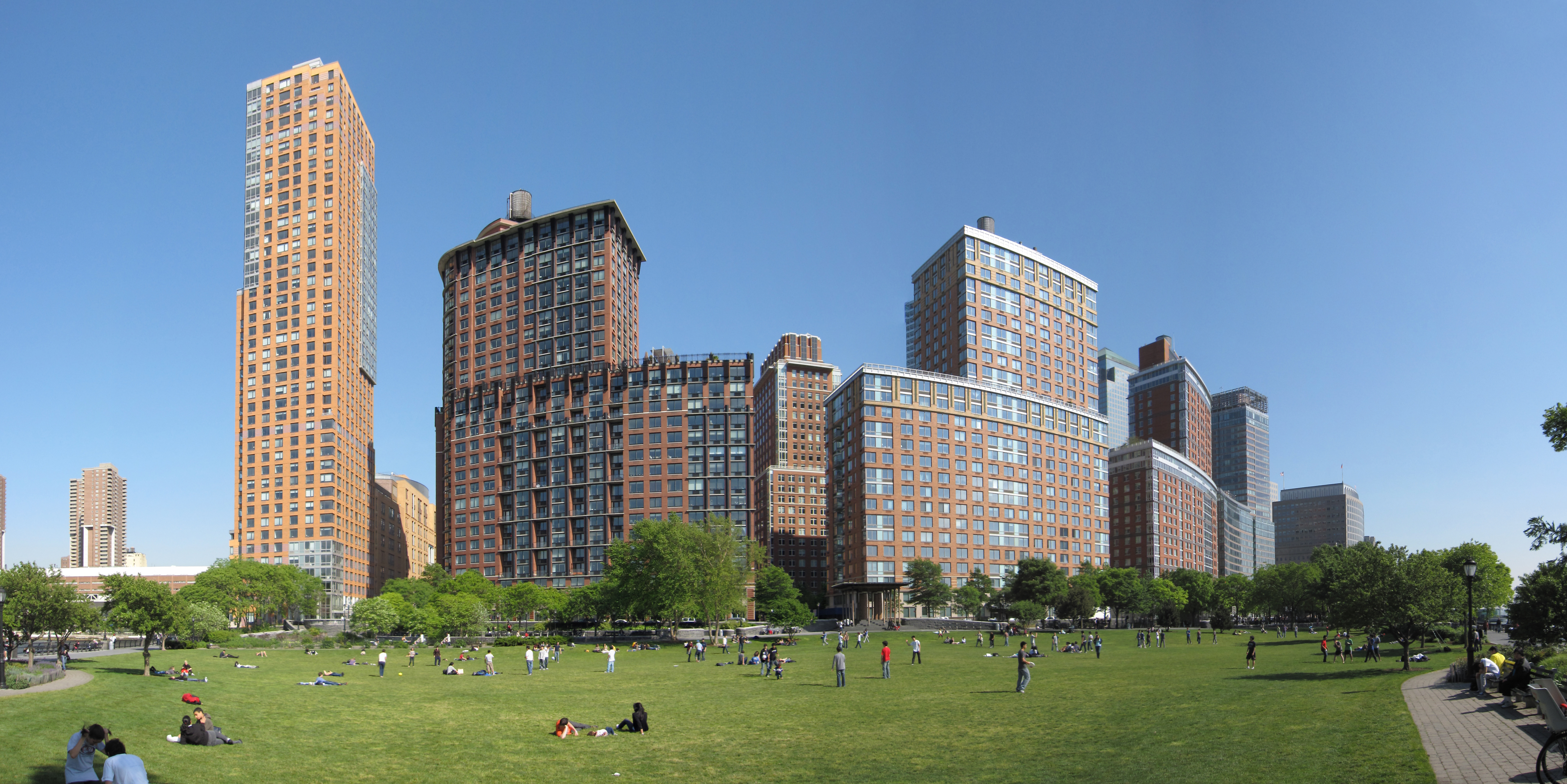
A field in Rockefeller State Park, with the buildings along River Terrace behind it

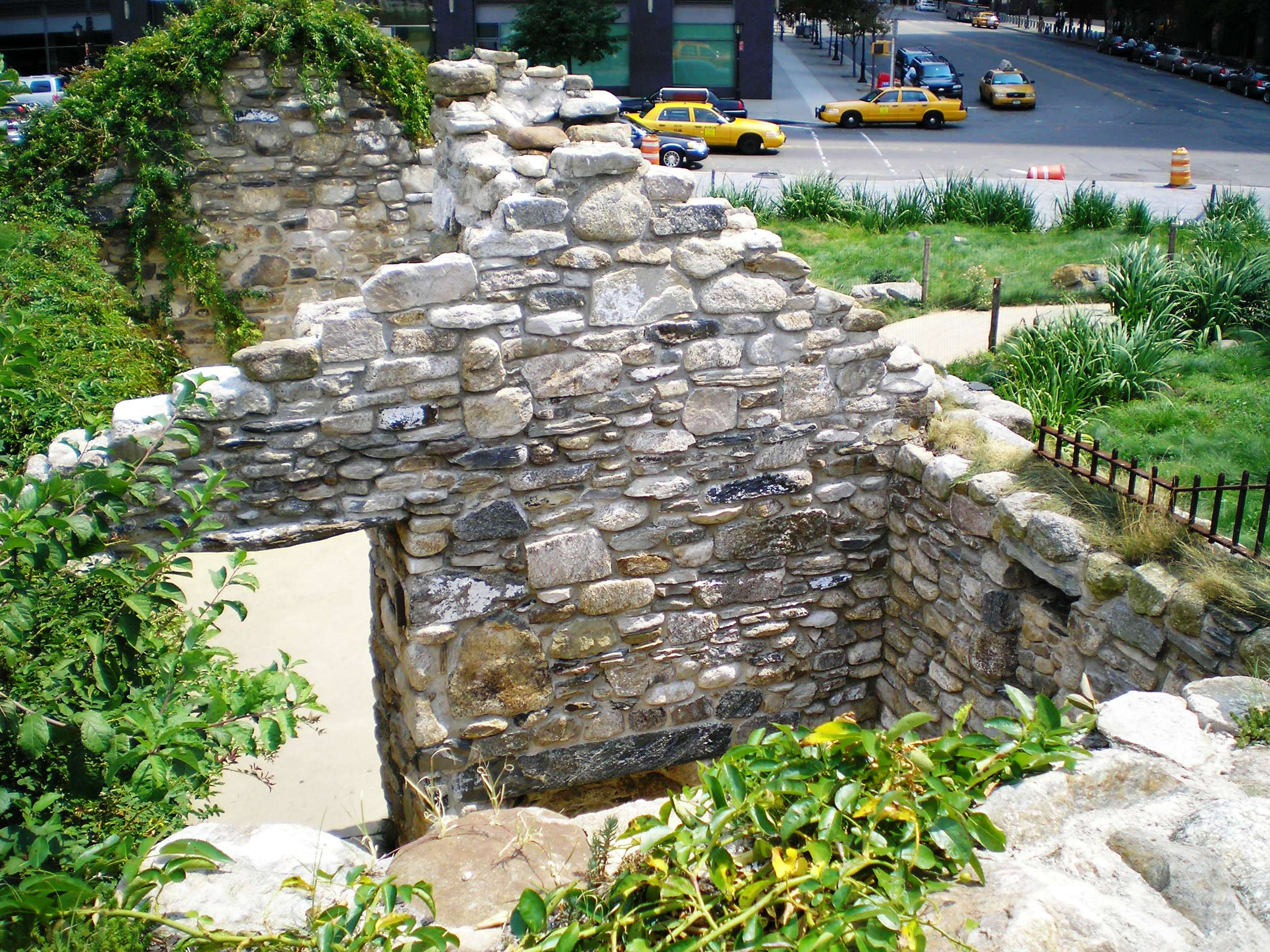
At the corner of Vesey Street and North End Avenue is the Irish Hunger Memorial.

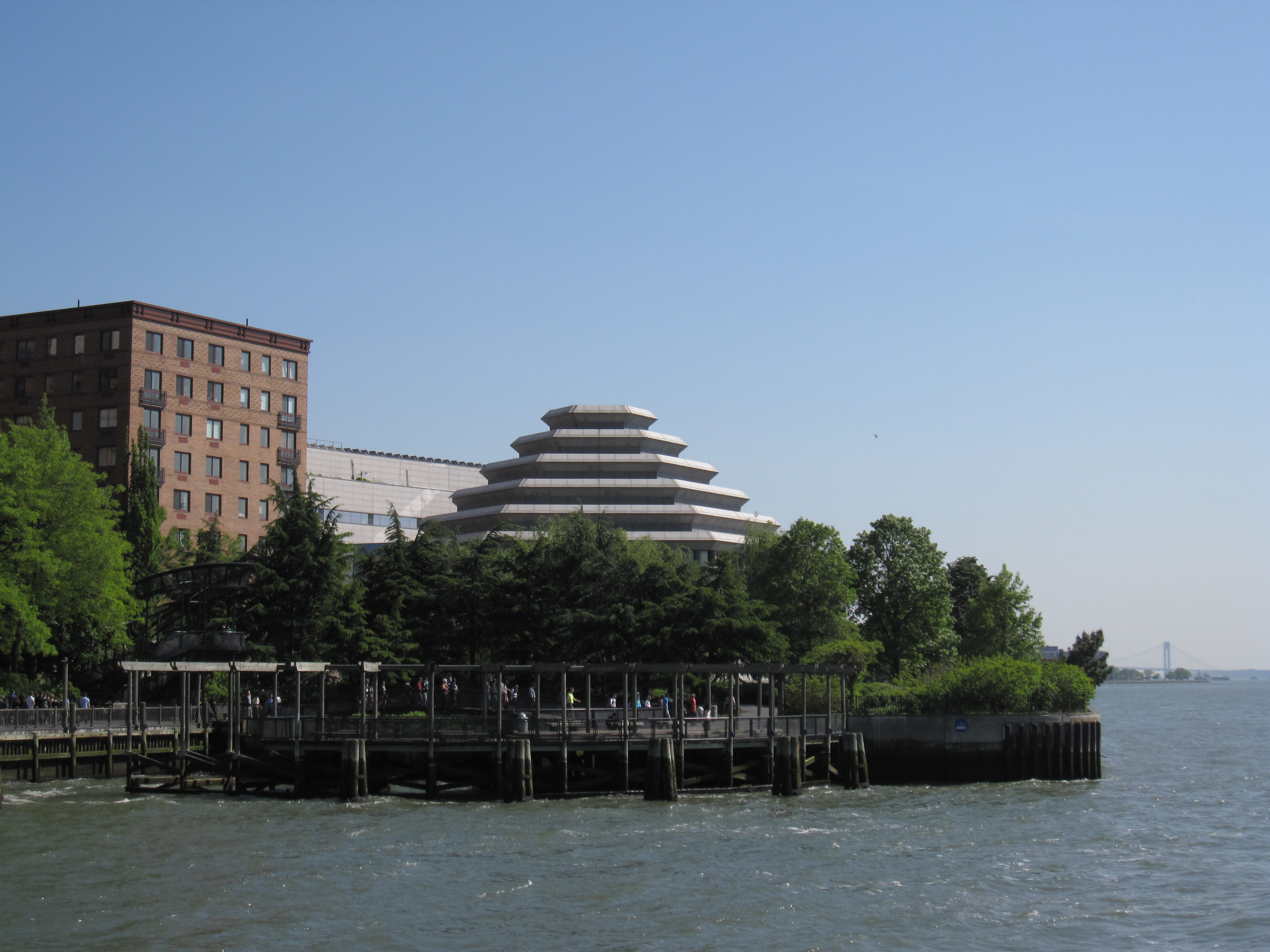
The Museum of Jewish Heritage from the Hudson River

More than one-third of the neighborhood is parkland.

Some large open spaces and parks include:

- Teardrop Park sits midblock, near the corner of Warren Street and River Terrace. Before construction, the site was empty and flat; part of the neighborhood's development plan, the park was designed in anticipation of four high residential towers on its west and east. Although a New York City public park, maintenance is overseen by the Battery Park City Parks Conservancy and the park was designed for the Battery Park City Authority. The park opened on September 30, 2004. There is also a southern extension to this park.
- Robert F. Wagner Jr. Park is located at the southern end of the neighborhood, adjacent to Battery Park. From March 2023 to July 2025, the park was closed for reconstruction as part of the South Battery Park City Resiliency Project.
- Nelson A. Rockefeller Park, located at the north end of the neighborhood, along the Hudson River, is the largest park in Battery Park City. It opened in 1992 and was designed by architects Carr, Lynch, Hack and Sandell and landscape architects Oehme Van Sweden and Donna Walcavage.

In addition, there are:

- Community Ballfields, located along West Street, between Murray and Warren Streets.
- The Esplanade, extending along the Hudson River from Stuyvesant High School to Battery Park.
- North Cove and Brookfield Place Waterfront Plaza, on the river between Liberty Street and Vesey Street. Monsignor Kowsky Plaza is located on the south side of the North Cove, next to the Gateway Plaza Apartments. Belvedere Plaza is located on the north side of the North Cove, next to the ferry terminal.
- Rector Park, a 2-acre park in the center of Rector Place, extending on both sides of South End Avenue. It was designed by Innocenti & Webel and Vollmer Associates.
- South Cove, located along the southern section of the Esplanade, and to the north of Wagner Park.
- West Thames Park, West Street between Albany and West Thames Streets

== Culture ==
=== Museums and memorials ===
Battery Park City includes several memorials and museums including:

- Irish Hunger Memorial, located on a 0.5-acre (0.20 ha) site at Vesey Street and North End Avenue. It is dedicated to raising awareness of the Great Irish Famine. Construction began in March 2001, and the memorial was completed and dedicated on July 16, 2002.
- Museum of Jewish Heritage, a memorial to those who were murdered in the Holocaust
- Skyscraper Museum, an architecture museum in Millennium Point
- Hurricane Maria Memorial honors the victims of Hurricane Maria, which struck Puerto Rico on September 20, 2017.
- Mother Cabrini Memorial, dedicated on October 12, 2020, honors the patroness of immigrants.
- 9/11 Memorial at South Cove, created and dedicated on September 9, 2015.
- NYC Police Memorial is located at Liberty Street and South End Avenue, and was dedicated on October 20, 1997.

=== Public art ===
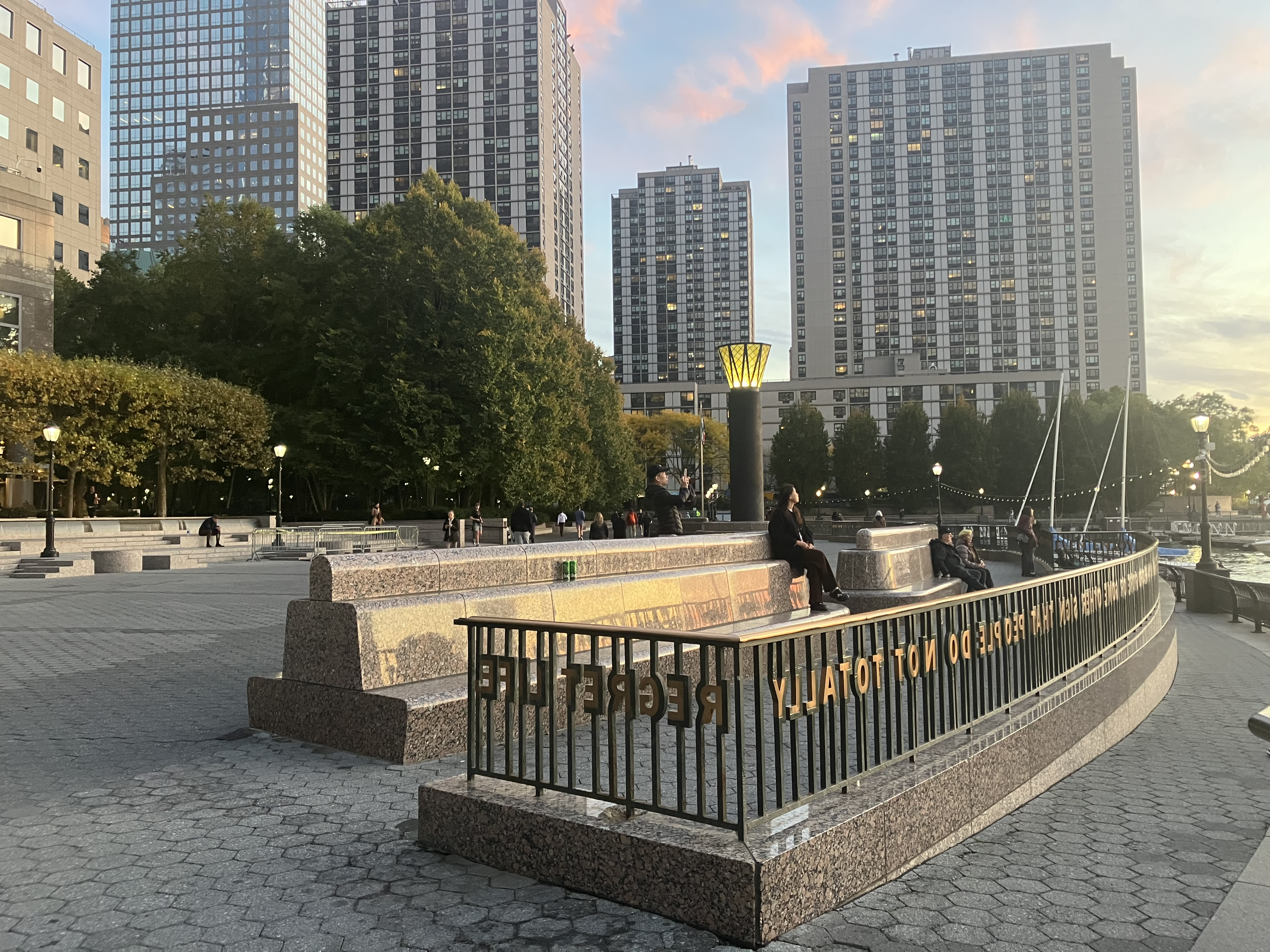
Waterfront Plaza at Brookfield Place, including fence with poetic lettering designed by Siah Armajani and granite benches designed by Scott Burton

In the 1970s and early 1980s, there were various temporary art installations, including Wheatfield — A Confrontation and Art on the Beach, on the empty landfill deposited after construction of the World Trade Center.

Public art was incorporated into the design of the neighborhood, with placement of sculptures in the parks and other open spaces. Artists Scott Burton and Siah Armajani played an instrumental role in the design of the North Cove waterfront plaza, in front of Brookfield Place. Artists Mary Miss worked alongside architect Stanton Eckstut and landscape architect Susan Child on the design of the South Cove.

Wagner Park is home to several sculptures including Eyes, by Louise Bourgeois, Ape & Cat (at the Dance), by Jim Dine, and Resonating Bodies by Tony Cragg. Sculptures and artwork in Rockefeller Park include The Real World by Tom Otterness, Ulysses, by Ugo Attardi, Pavilion, by Demetri Porphyrios, and Sunrise, Sunset (Revolution), by Autumn Ewalt and Dharmesh Patel.

Along the South Esplanade, at Rector Place, is Rector Gate, by R.M. Fischer and Sitting/Stance, by Richard Artschwager, at West Thames Street. From 1987 until November 2025, the Upper Room, by Ned Smyth, was located at the west end of Albany Street.

The Upper Room was removed by the Battery Park City Authority in order to install flood gates at the end of Albany Street, as part of the Northwest Battery Park City Resiliency Project. The resiliency projects also involves removal and future relocation of granite steps and circular tables in front of Brookfield Place, and closure of the North Cove from 2026 until 2031.

== Notable residents ==
Notable residents include:

- Tyra Banks (born 1973), TV personality
- Leonardo DiCaprio, actor, resident of 1 Rockefeller Park
- Sacha Baron Cohen, actor and comedian, former resident of 1 Rockefeller Park
- Isla Fisher, actress, former resident of 1 Rockefeller Park
- Dave Gahan, musician, resident of 1 Rockefeller Park
- Kris Humphries, basketball player, resident of Liberty Luxe

== See also ==
- Hudson River Park Trust
- New York Convention Center Operating Corporation
- Lower Manhattan Development Corporation
- Municipal Assistance Corporation for the City of NY
- Roosevelt Island Operating Corporation
- United Nations Development Corporation
