= Charles J. Urstadt =

American real estate executive (1928–2020)

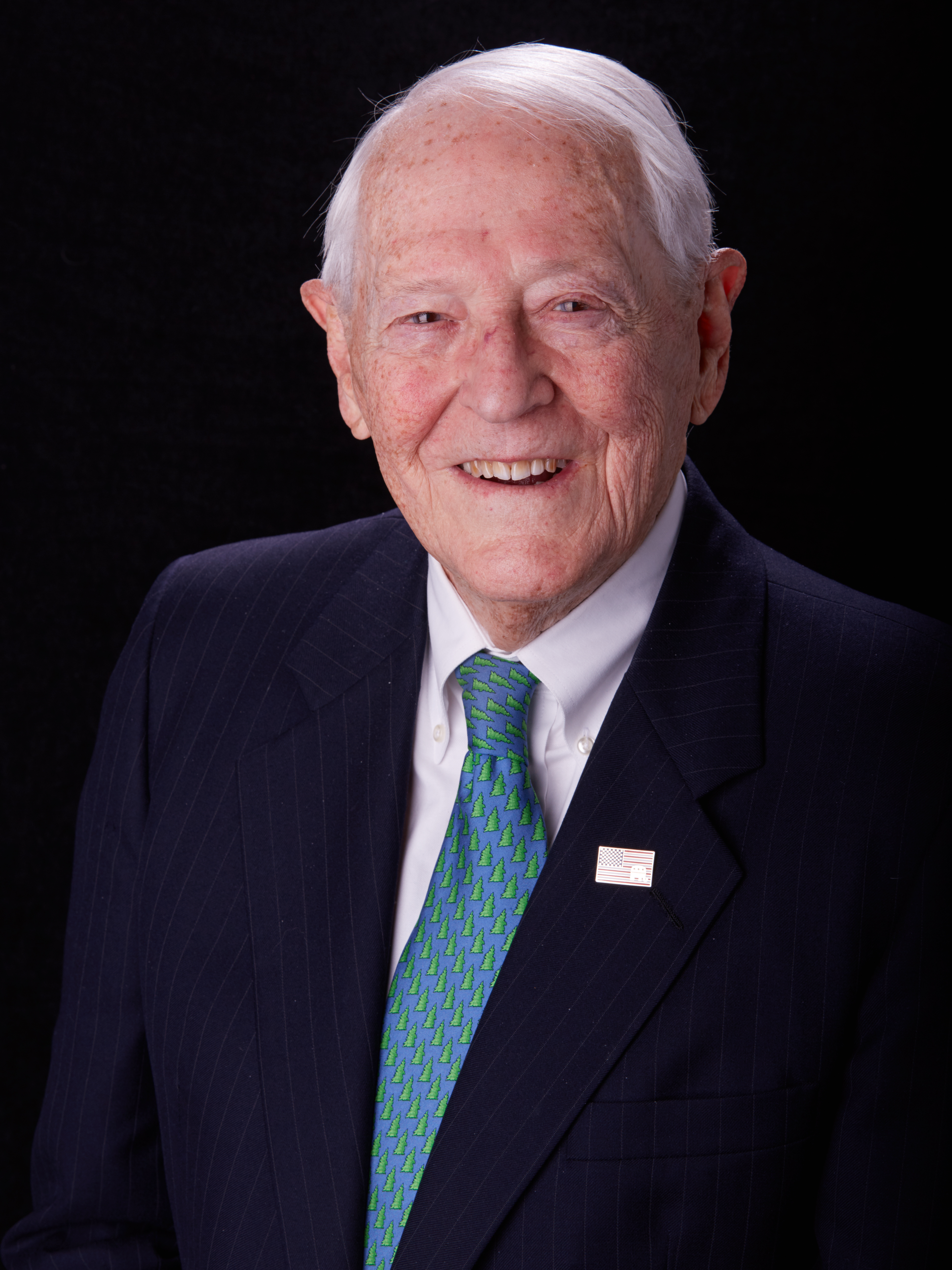
- Born: Charles Jordan Urstadt; October 27, 1928; Manhattan, New York, U.S.
- Died: March 3, 2020 (aged 91); Bronxville, New York, U.S.
- Education: Dartmouth College; Tuck School of Business; Cornell Law School
- Occupations: Real estate developer Investor
- Years active: 1953–2019
- Employer: Urstadt Biddle Properties
- Known for: Development of Battery Park City
- Title: Chairman emeritus
- Spouse: Elinor McClure Funk (m. 1957)
- Children: 2

New York State Housing Commissioner
- In office 1969–1971
- Governor: Nelson Rockefeller

Charles Jordan Urstadt (October 27, 1928 – March 3, 2020) was an American real estate executive and investor. He was an important figure for the development of Battery Park City in Manhattan and for the elimination of rent control in New York.

Appointed by Governor Nelson Rockefeller, Urstadt was New York State Housing Commissioner from 1969 to 1971. He became known as the first chairman of the Battery Park City Authority, a public benefit corporation that created a mixed use development on 92 acres of landfill on the lower west side of Manhattan.

In 1973, he joined Douglas Elliman, one of New York's largest real estate companies. Urstadt later joined Urstadt Biddle Properties in 1975, where he became chairman emeritus upon his retirement in 2019.

== Early life ==
Born in 1928, Urstadt was the son of Claire (Jordan) and Charles George Urstadt. His great-grandfather was born on a farm in the Bronx in 1840 and his grandfather purchased buildings in the borough in 1920s. Urstadt grew up in one of the buildings his grandfather owned and his father managed on West 195th Street in Kingsbridge Heights, Bronx.

Urstadt graduated from the Bronx High School of Science at age sixteen. He graduated from Dartmouth College, Dartmouth's Tuck School of Business and Cornell Law School.

== Early career ==
In 1953, he joined the New York law firm of Nevius, Brett & Kellogg as an attorney. A year later, he enlisted in the United States Navy for two years.

Urstadt served as vice president and counsel of Zeckendorf Property Corporation after working as assistant secretary and counsel of its parent company Webb & Knapp. In 1963, he was named as secretary and counsel of Alcoa Residences, a subsidiary of Alcoa Properties. In 1965, he was named vice president of Alcoa Residences.

== New York State Housing Commissioner ==
In 1967, New York Governor Nelson Rockefeller appointed Urstadt as deputy commissioner of the division of housing and community renewal. He was promoted to commissioner in 1969.

In 1971, the state legislature approved a bill that ended rent control on New York City apartments as tenants voluntarily vacated them. The process was known as vacancy decontrol. Urstadt was instrumental in writing the bill. Also that year, the legislature passed what became known as the "Urstadt Law," which transferred power over rent control laws from city to state lawmakers. Proponents of the measures said the city's rent control program was outdated, discouraged renovation of apartment buildings and had driven new housing from the city with losses of 20,000 units a year. Critics said the laws bypassed home rule for the city.

Six months after the vacancy decontrol law was passed, Urstadt said new housing starts went up 237% in three months. Urstadt credited vacancy decontrol as a major factor contributing to the increase.

Urstadt resigned his position as commissioner in 1973 to avoid conflict of interest when he and four partners bought the Manhattan real estate firm of Douglas L. Elliman & Co.

== Battery Park City ==
In 1968, in addition to his duties with the New York state division of housing, Urstadt was appointed chairman of the Battery Park City Authority by Gov. Rockefeller. The state agency was created to develop 92 acres along the southern tip of Manhattan including 88 acres of submerged land along the Hudson River from Battery Park to Chambers Streets. The development was to include 21,000 housing units as well as office space and parks.

The project was soon caught in disputes between state and city officials over design and other matters. Then, the New York real estate market slowed amid concerns over the city's fiscal condition.

Despite uncertain financial and real estate markets, the landfill was completed and ground was broken for the first six buildings in 1974. By 1975, foundation work was underway for the first six buildings of the project.

With the city in financial turmoil, a 1975 bond offering to finance construction of the first six buildings of the project failed.

In 1978, work resumed on the development after 17 months of inactivity. The work involved a new roadway and utility support for the first six apartment buildings. Site work had been halted because of conditions set by the Carter Administration for federal financial guarantees. Urstadt said the American Stock Exchange and the New York Law School were considering moving to the development.

In 1979, New York Governor Hugh Carey replaced Urstadt as Battery Park City Authority chairman with William D. Hassett Jr.

Urstadt later returned to the Battery Park City Authority from 1996 to 2010 as vice chairman and board member. He was appointed by Gov. George E. Pataki.

During a recession in 2009 in which the city was facing budget shortfalls, Urstadt proposed that the city exercise an option to purchase the Battery Park City land for $1. The option was part of the agreement that transferred title from the city to the Battery Park City Authority. He argued the city could take back the land from the authority along with the $200 million in annual rents and payments from developers. Urstadt proposed that the $1.1 billion bonds issued by the authority could be satisfied by the sale of the income from the commercial leases as revenue from the commercial sale would come to at least $2 billion leaving a surplus after the bonds were paid off. He also suggested that by dissolving the authority, an overall savings of $15 million could be achieved.

The Independent Budget Office of the City of New York also recommended the city take over Battery Park City in a report published in February 2020. The report echoed Urstadt's proposal as a way to increase revenue to the city. An article published by the Broadsheet Daily described the complex shared ownership structure of Battery Park City between the city and state that was set up by Urstadt.

== Real estate career ==
In 1973, GMU Associates, a partnership that included Urstadt and Edwin Jay Gould, bought a majority interest in Douglas L. Elliman & Co., one of New York's largest real estate companies. Urstadt later sold his interest in the company.

An investment group led by Urstadt purchased Pearce, Mayer & Greer, Inc., a commercial mortgage and sales brokerage company, from W.R. Grace & Company in 1979. Urstadt served as the chief executive officer of the company. The company's name was later changed to Pearce, Urstadt, Mayer & Greer, Inc. In 1987, Urstadt sold the company to New York real estate investor Alex DiLorenzo.

In 1975, Urstadt joined the board of directors of Hubbard Real Estate Investments, a real estate investment trust listed on the New York Stock Exchange. He became chief executive officer in 1989.

Once he took over as CEO, Urstadt changed the company's focus from a diverse portfolio to one specializing in neighborhood shopping centers in the suburban New York region. The centers were typically anchored by grocery stores in affluent communities. The new strategy took advantage of the company's extensive market knowledge and allowed for more efficient management of the properties. An important part of Urstadt's plan was to keep the company's debt low relative to the size of its assets.

The company was later renamed Urstadt Biddle Properties, Inc. The Urstadt and Biddle families owned about 25% of the company in 2013. That year, Urstadt stepped down as chief executive officer of the company but remained as chairman. Willing L. Biddle, the president of the company, then became the chief executive officer. In 2018, the company owned or had interests in 84 properties containing approximately 5.1 million square feet of space.

Urstadt retired as chairman in 2019 and was named chairman emeritus. His son, Charles D. Urstadt, was named chairman of Urstadt Biddle Properties.

== Personal life ==
In 1957, Urstadt married Elinor McClure Funk of Santa Monica, California. They had two children, Charles Deane Urstadt and Catherine Urstadt Biddle. His daughter Catherine is married to Willing L. Biddle, the president of Urstadt Biddle Properties.

When Urstadt turned 72 years old in 2000, he became the world champion swimmer for the 50-meter breaststroke in the 70 to 75 age group in tournaments held by the amateur Masters Swimming organization. He beat out 28 swimmers in the competition. Urstadt had not competed as a swimmer since his high school years when he won the New York City High School Championships three years in a row and then at Dartmouth College as captain of the swim team.

Urstadt died at his home in Bronxville, New York, on March 3, 2020, of stroke-related complications, aged 91.
