= Battery Tower (Manhattan) =

Abandoned 1929 skyscraper proposal

Coordinates: 40.7077°N 74.0153°W

Battery Tower was a proposed initial unit of a $50,000,000 1929 residential development on West Street in the Financial District of Manhattan, New York City, near Battery Park. It would have been the first hotel-apartment completed in the Financial District. It became one of a number of skyscraper projects left unfinished. Battery Park City was built on the site of the proposed development, nearly six decades later.

== History of the proposed site ==
During the first half of the 19th century this locale, bounded by Battery Place, Liberty Street, West Street, Greenwich Street, Carlisle Street, Washington Street, Morris Street, Albany Street, Rector Street, and Cedar Street, was primarily taken up by private residences. In the early years of the 19th century the larger theaters were downtown, notably one on Park Row. Battery Park was a public walkway for the wealthy of the era. The older buildings in the region, which became tenements, still retained vestiges of the appearance which were "earmarks of their original high estate". Such features were American colonial architecture doorways and interiors, along with window lintels and cornices. These details were indicative of construction in the distant past.

== Architectural design ==
Thompson & Churchill, architects, drew the plans for the envisioned building. One of them, Henry S. Churchill, commented about the emphasis on mass in the construction of the edifice, to the exclusion of superficialities. Its flat surfaces would be embellished by the inclusion of exterior color contrasts. The plans designated six lower floors for stores and offices and the upper thirty-five for residential living space. This schematic would enable the lowest level apartments, on the seventh floor, to be comparatively free from street noises. A number of terraces were planned to overlook the Hudson River. Stores and offices would have separate entrances and elevators.

Aside from business space the apartment hotel was to offer 428 suites and 255 bachelor rooms. Suites would range in size from one-room bachelor apartments to four rooms and two baths. A ten-room suite with terraces would occupy the entire fortieth floor. Each of the suites would have radio outlets and some would have fireplaces. Amenities would include handball courts, a swimming pool and gymnasium in the basement, a solarium, and sun terraces. The building was to have a total of fifty two terraces.

Battery Tower was to be constructed entirely of brick and steel. The bricks would be in four shades of buff and two in red. They would be arranged in vertical lines to produce a captivating effect. Battery Tower would have been 435 feet (133 m) high on a plot of 29,000 square feet (2,700 m^{2}). The main portion of the building was to be centered on West Street and would have been twenty stories high. The design allocated 7,000 square feet (650 m^{2}) per floor in the tower, which would have been situated on the exact center of the plot. The penthouse apartment was designated to house machinery. Its inclusion made for a total of forty-three stories in height. The penthouse was conceived to be constructed of white brick with a gold cap of terra cotta. It would have been illuminated at night.

== Ownership ==
The forty-story structure, an apartment hotel, was initiated by Downtown Homes, Inc. at a cost of $10,000,000, starting in 1929. The J.H. Taylor Construction Company and Downtown Homes, Inc., were organized by a syndicate which was controlled by General Realty and Utilities Corporation. By October 1929 the syndicate acquired 102,000 square feet (9,500 m^{2}) of ground for the building of a group of apartment hotels at the center of an old tenement district. The Gening Company and A.M. Bing & Son interests also became involved in the project's completion.

== Excavation ==
Wrecking operations on the site began on August 12, 1929, according to Albert Mayer, president of Downtown Homes, Inc. The Greenhouse Company, Inc., removed four-story structures which were on the site, 32 to 42 West Street, through to 56 to 66 Washington Street. Demolition was completed over a twenty-five-day span, followed by soundings, and construction work. A five-story building and a group of tenements at 56 to 58 Washington Street through to 32 to 43 West Street were razed.

The J.H. Taylor Construction Company began sinking foundations with a target date of fall 1930 for complete occupancy. Interlocking steel sheeting was employed in a new foundation process used on Battery Tower. This prevented water seepage. Excavation work was carried out by Moran & Proctor, engineers. They excavated entirely to the bedrock rather than using the normal procedure of digging to a partial depth and then sinking caissons to bedrock. Construction was hampered by difficult digging which had to penetrate crib pier remnants, and old docks, known to be beneath the site. Sinking of a pile foundation, needed for the West Side Elevated Highway, was halted in the first week of December 1929. This occurred when workers ran into 40 feet (12 m) of old bulkheads, sunken docks, and ships.

== Ambitious architectural era ==
A February 1930 Syracuse Herald-Journal article contained an architect's drawing of Battery Tower. The caption read "still another skyscraper will be added to the famous group at the lower end of Manhattan Island". It was pictured alongside artistic renditions of the Chrysler Building and a Francis S. Swales' sketch of a group of skyscrapers which were envisioned to arise in the Municipal Center of New York. The years 1929 –1930 were replete with new development ideas. Louis Adler aspired to construct a 105 story building at 80 Wall Street. Cities Service official Henry Latham Doherty acquired $3 million and 4 acres (16,000 m^{2}) worth of real estate in the mid-1920s at the lower tip of Manhattan, around Battery Park. He considered spending close to $100,000,000 to build an independent business center for shipping and foreign interests. He conceived of a Battery Park dominated by two pyramidal skyscrapers and topped by the Cities Service logo.
