= Kumospace =

American virtual office software company

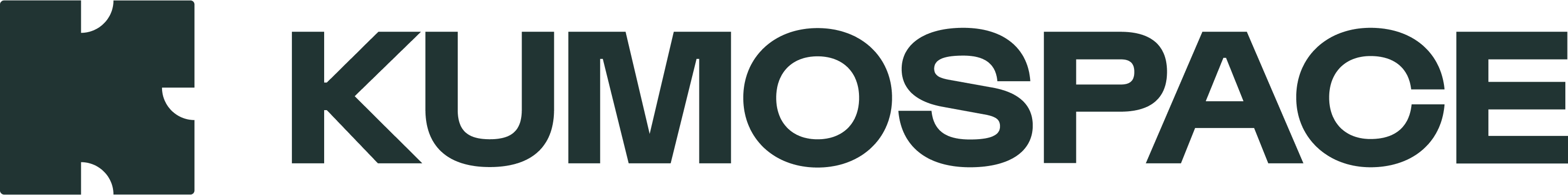
- Company type: Privately held company
- Industry: Collaborative software
- Founded: November 1, 2020; 5 years ago
- Founders: Yang Mou and Brett Martin
- Headquarters: New York City, United States
- Area served: Worldwide
- Products: Communication software, Virtual office, virtual workplace
- Website: www.kumospace.com

Kumospace is an American virtual office and virtual events software and eponymous company that develops and maintains it, based in New York City. When using the platform users enter a stylized, video game-like simulation of a physical office with chairs, coffee tables, water coolers, and conference rooms.

== History ==
Kumospace was founded by two friends, Yang Mou and Brett Martin. According to the New York Times, Kumospace founders were mainly influenced by massively multiplayer online role-playing games such as World of Warcraft.

Before creating Kumospace, they created several companies focused on using technology to connect people including Sonar and Switch.

During the platform's development from August 2020 to March 2021, Kumospace increased its active user base 100 times from an undisclosed base. The software was officially launched on November 1, 2020.

In April 2021, Kumospace secured $3 million in seed funding led by Boldstart Ventures with participation from Lightspeed’s Scout Fund and GP from ENIAC Ventures.

In August 2022, Kumospace closed a $21 million Series A round led by Lightspeed with participation from Boldstart Ventures and others. The Series A brings 20-employee Kumospace's total raised capital to $24 million.

In October 2022, Kumospace partnered with theDesk, a coworking space platform headquartered in Hong Kong, to launch a virtual work and collaboration platform for businesses in the country.

In 2021, Super Goop, a cosmetic brand specializing in SPF, presented the launch of its new product, Glowscreen Body SPF 40, through Kumospace's digital platform. It was the first known experience in Thailand. The event featured a large swimming pool and a broadcast by the brand's founder.

In 2023, Kumospace acquired Kosy Software Ltd.

== Software workflow ==
Users can log in as guests without providing an email address. After selecting an avatar, they enter a stylized, video game-like simulation of a physical office with chairs, coffee tables, water coolers, and conference rooms. The platform offers team-building analogs, such as games, music, and drinks (in a virtual bar).

Kumospace has ten rooms, each with a challenge you can solve with your team. Over time, Kumospace plans to expand the range of games embedded in the virtual environment. Virtual office spaces come in different sizes and are designed for 30 people.

== Academic research and courses ==
The software has been the subject of academic papers in USA, Indonesia, Germany, Vietnam and other countries.

Several British universities included Kumospace as separate sessions within their courses on Networking and Profile building.
