= Servcorp =

Australian office services company

Servcorp Limited
- Type: Public
- Traded as: ASX: SRV
- Industry: Serviced Offices
- Founded: 1978; 48 years ago
- Founder: Alfred Moufarrige
- Headquarters: Sydney, Australia
- Number of locations: 150+ locations
- Key people: Mark Vaile - Chairman; Alfred Moufarrige - CEO; David Hunt - CFO; Daniel Kukucka - CIO
- Products: Virtual Offices, Serviced Offices, Meeting Rooms, and Coworking Spaces
- Website: www.servcorp.com

Servcorp Limited is an Australian multinational office services company founded in 1978. The company provides Serviced Offices, Virtual Offices and Coworking Spaces across multiple international markets.

As of June 2025, Servcorp maintained operations in 40 cities across 19 countries, comprising more than 150 locations worldwide. Its office are located in commercial buildings, including those in New York, London and other global financial centers. According to a 2017 article in Entrepreneur, Servcorp has provided office and virtual office services to clients including Lyft, Morgan Stanley, J.P. Morgan, and Cartier.

== History ==
=== Foundation and early growth ===
Servcorp was founded in Sydney in 1978 by Alfred Moufarrige. In 1986, the company introduced its first virtual office services enabling clients to access business addresses and administrative support without leasing physical office space. International expansion began in 1987 with establishment of centres in Asia and France, followed by opening in Japan in 1995. Servcorp was listed on the Australian Stock Exchange in 1999, the same year it opened offices in Shanghai, marking its entry into China.

== International expansion ==
=== 2000–2014 ===
In the early 2000, Servcorp extended its network through Europe, Asia, and the middle East. by 2003, the company employed more than 130 staff in Tokyo. It opened is first United Kingdom office in 2009 and its first United States office in 2010.

The company entered the Turkish market in 2010, later adding a second Istanbul office in 2011. In 2014, Servcorp opened a location in Beijing's Fortune Financial Center and signed a lease for office space in the One World Trade Center in New York City.

=== 2015–2019 ===
From 2015 onward, Servcorp focused on upgrading technology infrastructure and expanding in high-growth regions. in 2017, it announced plans to modernise its office systems and refurbish key sites. The company opened its first German office in Berlin in 2019.

In 2017, the Australian Competition & Consumer Commission (ACCC), a competition watchdog, alleged that the standard form contract used by Servcorp was unfair and pursued court action. In 2018, an Australian Federal Court declared that 12 terms in the standard contracts used Servcorp were unfair. As part of the outcome, Servcorp agreed to a compliance program for its Australian business and agreed to pay the ACCC's legal costs.

=== Recent developments ===
In 2020, Servcorp opened new offices in One Museum Place in Shanghai, and expanded its existing location in Hobart and Brisbane. In 2021, the company launched a new centre in the Philippine Stock Exchange Tower.

Between 2019 and 2022, Servcorp was affected by COVID-19 pandemic. Global lockdowns and travel restrictions reduced office demand. In response to the pandemic, leading the company to implement cost-cutting measures, reduce staff, and introduce health and safety protocols across its locations. In 2020, the company announced the closure of 12 U.S. locations as part of a reorganisation, while retaining a presence in Chicago, Houston, New York, and Washington DC. The closures formed part of a broader restructuring following a 22% decline in revenue to A$275.7 million.

Following the pandemic disruptions, Servcorp Limited began to recover. In the year 2023, revenue rose around 7%, supported by new openings in the Yanmar Tokyo Promenade Building in Japan and Bell Gully Building in New Zealand. The company continued to expand with an office in Riyadh's King Abdullah Financial District (KAFD) in June 2024, followed by an additional floor KAFD and new locations in Abu Ouf Plaza and Alluqmani Business Center in Madinah in 2025.
