= Serviced office =

Office provider

A serviced office is an office or office building that is fully equipped and managed by a facility management company, also known as an office provider, which then rents individual offices or floors to other companies. Serviced offices, also referred to as managed offices, flexible offices, business centers, executive suites or executive centers, are often found in the business districts of large cities around the world. A serviced office broker will commonly help business center owners and facility management companies to rent serviced office space.There are also brokerage offices available. Companies offering serviced offices are generally able to offer more flexible rental terms, as opposed to a conventional leased office which may require furnishing, equipment, and more restrictive leases. Space is normally flexible, allowing for additional space to be allocated at short notice, should the size of an individual business change. Serviced office providers often allow tenants to share reception services, business machines and other resources, providing reduced costs and access to equipment which may otherwise be unaffordable. By providing businesses with access to a workplace, technology and people central to its operations, the serviced office can be considered a type of virtual office. Serviced offices are a central component to the flexible workspace industry.

== History ==
Pioneers of the serviced office industry in the United States are recorded as early as the 1960s, with the creation of OmniOffices in 1962, followed by the launch of Paul Fegen's furnished law suites for attorneys in 1966. The concept then spread abroad to Australia, where Alf Moufarrige founded ServCorp in 1978, and to the U.K. where the Fuchs family launched a business center in Northampton, England, in 1979, which is still open under their family brand OSiT (Office Space in Town Ltd).

During the 1980s, serviced offices in the major US business cities, evolved from law suites into business centers.

In the United Kingdom, the concept of working together and sharing premises, staff and other overheads was at first primarily used by barristers. They normally band together into "chambers" to share clerks (administrators) and operating expenses. Some chambers grow to be large and sophisticated, and have a distinctly corporate feel.

The advances in computer technology during the 1980s reduced the amount of staff required to operate a serviced office, and increased the technologies a serviced office could offer its clients, including access to computers, voicemail, and fax machines. Richard Nissen founded Business Space Ltd. in London in 1980 and was a pioneer of the new digital exchange telecommunications system that used electronics to place and transfer telephone calls.

Now primarily virtual offices offering businesses a place, people and technology, serviced offices became an industry. Seminal reports on the industry were carried out by DTZ in the early 2000s, and published with the British Council for Offices. The National Audit Office of the UK has produced a guide to help Government Departments and public bodies to assess the case for flexible managed space instead of conventional office space.

In November 2014, a business report carried out by the Business Centre Association (renamed the Flexible Space Association in 2019) showed that serviced offices in the UK are using 70 million square feet of space, house around 80,000 businesses, provide over 400,000 jobs and generate in the region of £2bn to the UK economy.

Coworking spaces are a branch of serviced offices that add elements of collaboration and community to the workspace. The term was coined by Bernard de Koven in 1999 and has since become a popular trend for start-ups and international satellites.

== Client types ==
Clients of serviced office facilities fall into the following categories:

- New market/locational – Businesses which are typically headquartered abroad or in another region of the country which require a business presence in the area of operation of the business center.
- Startup Companies / Entrepreneurial – Small to medium businesses or enterprises which don't want to make a financial commitment to a longer term lease. This class of client likely also benefits from not having to add administrative and support personnel to payroll, with all the pursuant HR costs (benefits, insurance, recruitment).
- Overflow – Typically a large company experiencing growth, with traditional leased space in the area which it has outgrown. These can be short-term requirements (3–6 months) for large number of users (as many as 40-50).
- Interim – Clients that are in the process of moving from one space to another, and may be facing delays in the completion of the new space.
- Project-based – Clients that have a specific need for office space, based on a specific contract or project. Examples include film production teams or attorneys in the discovery process.

== Services ==
Services typically include:

- Dedicated receptionist;
- Administrative support
- Telecom service
- IT infrastructure and internet connectivity.

== Facilities ==
Facilities typically include:

- Conference Rooms;
- Meeting Rooms;
- Heating, air conditioning and other utilities;
- Furniture;
- Full-time security; and
- Insurance

== Benefits ==
Serviced offices may offer benefits over conventional offices for new or dynamic businesses, including:

- No / low start up costs.
- Building Maintenance is included.
- Receptionist.
- Less day-to-day administration and upfront legal expense to complete.
- 'Bundled' packages (where one monthly payment covers most costs) are available, as are 'unbundled' (where each item used attracts a unit cost).

== Shortcomings ==
- Many serviced offices (although not all) give a generic, unbranded impression.
- In some cases there may be higher monthly cost than conventional leased space.
- As the serviced industry adapts to new technologies and services that are available, the terminology also continues to evolve. "Flexible workspace" is a term favored by most industry trade organizations (e.g. Flexible Space Association) as of 2019.

== Brokers ==
A serviced office broker is a company or individual that arranges transactions between a party interested in renting serviced office space and a business centre / office space owner, also known as an office provider. The serviced office broker then makes commission when the deal is made.

To fulfil the goal of finding clients to rent serviced office space, a serviced office broker will often do the following:

- Find business centres/ serviced office space in accordance with the clients needs and specification.
- Request a property condition disclosure form and any other forms that may be needed from the business centre owner.
- Request information from the business centre owner in order to describe the property successfully for advertising.
- List the business centre/ serviced office space available for rent to the public, often on the internet.
- Advertise the business centre/ serviced office space through listings, newsletters, promotions and other methods.
