= Virtual office =

Workspace service

A virtual office is part of the flexible workspace industry that provides businesses with any combination of services, space and/or technology, without those businesses bearing the capital expenses of owning or leasing a traditional office.

A virtual office can be used by entrepreneurs, freelancers, and small businesses that do not need or cannot afford a traditional office space. It can also be used by larger companies that want to establish a presence in a specific location without committing to a long-term lease.

Some virtual office providers offer additional services such as meeting room rentals, administrative support, and live receptionist services. These services are usually provided remotely, but also some virtual office providers have a physical office space where clients can have access to these services. This can be an attractive option for businesses that want to project a professional image without the cost of a full-time office.

Virtual office services started in the 1960s as serviced offices and have evolved with technology to include a wide variety of personnel, physical space, digital storage and communication services. Customers pay a contract fee for these services which may be offered à la carte, as packages or membership subscription. The concept is popular with companies of all sizes, including self-employed entrepreneurs. One of the primary allures of the virtual office is the flexibility it offers for employees and freelancers to work from a satellite office, home office, remote location or even on-the-go via a mobile device. At the same time, a company can offer its clients and employees a stable home office with access to amenities such as receptionist, conference rooms, desk space, mailboxes, printing and faxing at a permanent address, which are owned and maintained by the virtual office provider or a third party.

In 2021, a number of companies set out to fix the challenges of virtual meetings. This led to the appearance of virtual office software. When referring to a company having a virtual office, this no longer refers to a standard set of business services. Rather a virtual space for employees to gather and perform business-related activities.

Virtual office providers may also include digital capital such as cloud storage, web hosting, email and other web-based applications.

Also, according to the research, the attitudes and policies of employers in the virtual platform affect their employees' personal lives and productivity. Employees will be more productive if they believe their company trusts them, recognizes them, cares about them, and receives the proper training (including online processes, etc.), project management, and support to perform their tasks productively. When employees don't have to spend time, money, or resources on transportation between home and work, it positively impacts employee productivity. That is why it became necessary to create an appropriate software environment to ensure these processes' functioning.

== History ==
The virtual office concept is an evolution of the traditional executive suite. As an executive suite, lease became increasingly impractical for certain types and stages of business, it naturally opened the door to a virtual office concept.

In the mid-20th century, professionals and executives began to examine ways to make more efficient use of the rising cost of real estate, personnel and other capital. Below are some milestones in the resulting evolution of the virtual office, along with the advent of technologies that help shape the industry.

Year	Event
1962	The first known serviced office company, OmniOffices Group, was created.
1966	Serviced offices and executive suites were rented by Fegen Law Suites. This included large blocks of office space with furnished suites, reception services, telephone answering, photocopies, conference rooms, and a law library.
1972	ARPANET, the predecessor to the Internet, went public by connecting 40 computers in different locations.
1973	Attorney Office Management, Inc. developed an "off-site" program in response to lawyers wanting to partially retire. Instead of a full executive suite, Attorneys could work from home while continuing a part-time presence through AOMI's Beverly Hills location. Jack Nilles coined the terms "telecommuting" and "telework" to refer to remote work.
1974	Scientists with the Institute of Electrical and Electronics Engineers developed Transmission Control Protocol/Internet Protocol (TCP/IP), which allows different networks to communicate with each other.
1978	Alf Moufarrige founded Servcorp in Sydney. To reduce his overhead, he began sharing his premium office space, receptionist and clerical staff with other growing businesses. Servcorp took its virtual office concept international in 1980 and in 1999 became a publicly traded company.
1981	Released 1 April, The Osborne 1 became the first successful portable computer, designed by Adam Osborne. Although it still required a power source, it was considered portable as it could easily be transported. This was a first step in allowing professionals to work away from the office.
1982	ARPANET adopted TCP/IP, giving birth to the Internet. The term "virtual office" was used by John Markoff in an article published by InfoWorld magazine. Markoff wrote, "In the future virtual office, workers will no longer be constrained by computer equipment or geographic location, according to this vision. They will be free to travel or to interact with others while communicating information freely. The office as we know it will cease to have the central importance it does today."
1983	Chris Kern coined the term 'virtual office' in his column for the September 1983 issue of the American Way magazine. Kern used the term to describe the possibility of 'doing business while on the go' thanks to portable computers.
1984	The first personal digital assistant (PDA), the Organizer, was released by Psion.
1989	Timothy John Berners-Lee developed the World Wide Web, considered as being a key aspect of the development of the Information Age. Alon Cohen invented the type of audio that later enabled the creation of VoIP. VocalTec was the first company to offer Internet phone services and also became the first successful Internet IPO. Today, VoIP phones are a popular service that virtual offices offer.
1990	The first Internet search engine was developed by McGill University.
1991	The World Wide Web was released to the public. Also the first webcam, located at Cambridge University, was developed.
1992	"Virtual Office" became a registered trademark for the first time when Richard Nissen registered the term with the UK's Intellectual Property Office. IP-based videoconferencing technology evolved with more efficient video compression to allow PC-based use. CU-SeeMe was developed by Tim Dorcey at Cornell, which allowed users to videoconference and instant message other users.
1994	Ralph Gregory presented virtual offices as a franchise opportunity in the United States, turning the business into an industry.
1995	The motto that "work is something you do, not something you travel to" was coined. Variations of this motto include: "Work is what we do, not where we are."
1998	At the Winter Olympics opening ceremony in Nagano, Japan, Seiji Ozawa used IP-based videoconferencing to conduct the Ode to Joy from Beethoven's Ninth Symphony simultaneously across five continents in near-real time.
2000	The first Symbian phone, the touchscreen Ericsson R380 Smartphone, was released in 2000, and was the first device marketed as a "smartphone". It combined a PDA with a mobile phone.
2003	Skype is released to the public, allowing free IP-based communications using microphone, webcam and instant messaging to individual consumers.
2005	The official first "Coworking space" opened in San Francisco by Brad Neuberg. That same year, the first Impact Hub coworking space launched in London.
2006	Frank Cottle introduced the concept of wholesaling virtual offices and services to third-party retailers. This launched an influx of virtual office companies that still operate today.
2019	Due to the COVID-19 pandemic, there was a need to create high-quality software for permanent remote work.
2021	Development of numerous software for virtual offices. This software looks to replicate the benefits of a physical office within a virtual environment. Companies have adopted this software because they find it helps with company culture, collaboration, and visibility.

== Prerequisites for the spread of virtual offices ==
The most significant factor in the spread of virtual offices was the forced transition to remote work during the COVID-19 pandemic.

Society introduced remote work quickly, so new technologies and operating systems must be adequately tested and trained.

Employees and managers have to put in effort to maintain relationships with colleagues.

== Services ==
Virtual office infrastructure may include a variety of physical locations and services, as well as digital services. The infrastructure is shared across individuals and entities allowing resources to be used more efficiently. This allows users the flexibility of only renting or using the services they need.

=== Physical ===
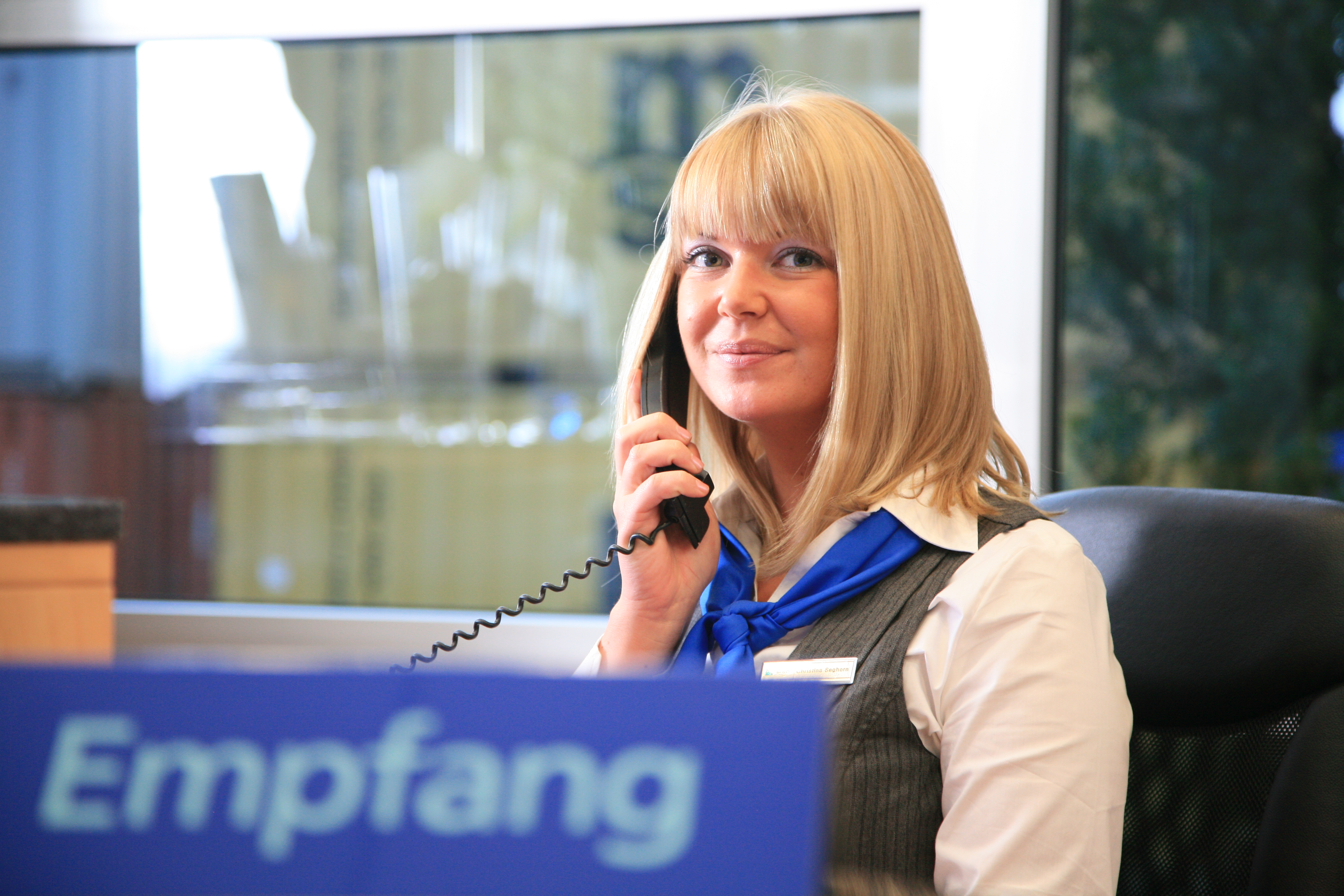
A receptionist for a virtual office

- A business address
- Mail services (receive, pick up and/or forwarding)
- Conference rooms
- Desk space and private offices
- Printing and related services such as copying, binding, faxing, scanning, laminating, and shredding.
- Receptionist services and answering services
- Storage space
- Photography studio

=== Digital ===
- A phone number
- Online phone system (VoIP)
- Virtual assistants
- Virtual receptionists
- Website domains and email
- Instant Message, chat and other web-based RTC platforms
- Video conferencing, including webinar-hosting or other screensharing platforms
- Online digital storage
- Project management tools
- Cloud-based applications (e.g. Google Docs, Sheets, and Slides or Office 365)

== Emerging trends ==
Coworking is a related trend in flexible workspaces that places an emphasis on users interacting with each other to create an organizational culture without working for the same company. Similar to virtual offices, coworking venues offer serviced workspaces and customers can use these on an as-needed basis.

Virtual reality technology is another trend that may soon impact virtual offices. Virtual reality applications have the capability of creating office spaces that are physical spaces within the virtual world where users can meet and work side-by-side.

== See also ==
- Virtual team
- Virtual workplace
