= Virtual workplace =

Workplace that is not located in any physical space

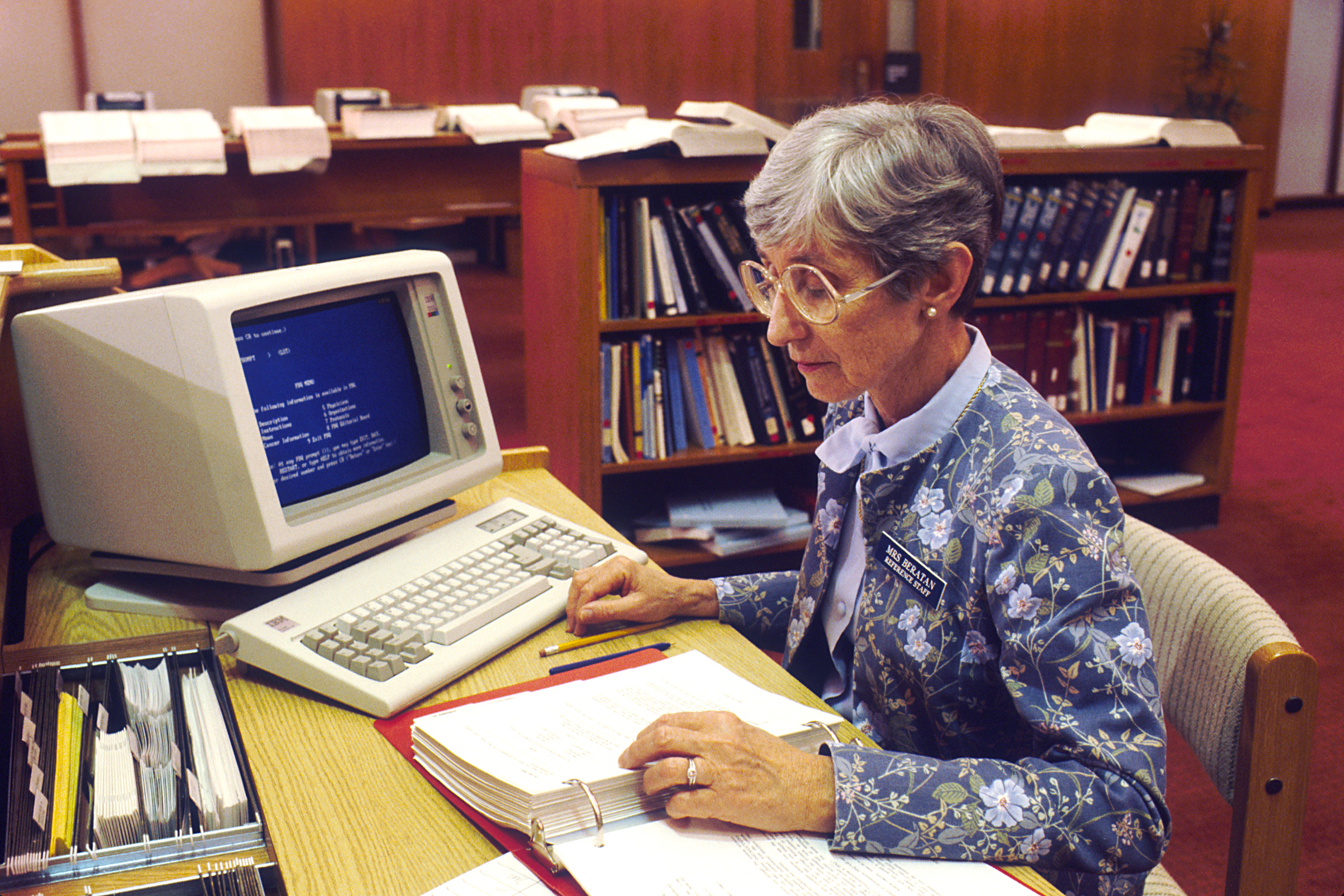
A librarian at the U.S. National Library of Medicine using an IBM personal computer to access the Physician Data Query, a database on cancer (1987)

A virtual workplace is a digitally connected work environment that allows employees and organizations to operate and collaborate remotely through digital communication and platforms. It integrates people, hardware, and software systems to enable productivity beyond physical office boundaries. A virtual workplace has become a popular alternative to traditional offices, in part due to advancements in digital connection tools, cloud-based infrastructure, and a rising demand for flexible work arrangements.

The phenomenon of a virtual workplace has grown in the 2000s as advances in technology have made it easier for employees to work from anywhere with an internet connection.

Virtual workplace demand grew drastically after the COVID-19 pandemic, when temporary remote and hybrid work models became long-term establishments. This transformation had a global impact, which impacted employee well-being, operational efficiency, and environmental sustainability. Analyses of post-pandemic workplaces show that remote and hybrid work reshape professional collaboration and redefine global work culture, infrastructure use, and sustainable business practices. The evolution of virtual workplaces also reflects decades of technological and organizational development, shaped by advances in communication technology and the globalization of business operations.

Historically, the concept of a virtual workplace developed alongside telecommuting or teleworking, information technology, and rising globalization during the late twentieth century. Early innovations in computer networking and the internet laid the foundation for flexible, location-independent work models that continue to evolve today.

== History ==
The development of the virtual workplace followed the advancements of telecommuting in the late twentieth century, when the rise of the internet and other computing advancements gave employees access to work outside of traditional offices. During the 1990s and early 2000s, globalization and digital transformation led to more organizations integrating flexible work schedules, supported by growing access to laptops, mobile networks, and collaborative software.

In the United States, the Telework Enhancement Act of 2010 established federal guidelines requiring executive agencies to promote remote work in feasible locations, as long as employee performance wasn't harmed. This indicated an early institutional step toward formalizing the virtual workplace. Government initiatives after the Act was established prioritized developing telework policies, written agreements between managers and employees, and the designation of officials responsible for reviewing telework programs, reflecting an organized approach to expand remote opportunities in government agencies. The Act also created a foundation that allowed telework to serve as a tool to continue tasks during periods of work disruption, while also reducing reliance on physical office spaces.

The COVID-19 pandemic in 2020 initiated lockdowns and social distancing policies, which forced many organizations and workers to transition to digital platforms. During the COVID-19 pandemic, millions of workers began remote work for the first time. 88% of office workers worldwide reported working from home during the pandemic, which was novel for 57%. Between April and December 2020, telework accounted for about 50% of paid work hours in the United States, compared to roughly 5% before the pandemic. During the same time, around one-third of private sector businesses expanded telework options, and about one-fifth of workers reported some form of relocation because of the pandemic. By mid-2021, 13% of jobs involved full-time telework and 22% involved some hybrid work. These trends marked the large-scale adoption of the virtual workplace, the broader concept encompassing telework and other forms of digitally connected work.

Research from IWG found that 70% of employees globally work remotely at least one day every week, and more than half do so at least half of the week.

Cities in which the population of remote workers increased significantly were referred to as Zoom towns.

== Types ==
Virtual workplaces can be organized in many ways depending on how organizations use physical space, work location, and digital communication. There are multiple common workplace layouts that organizations use including remote work arrangements, shared or non-assigned office spaces, and virtual teams, with each relying on information and communication technologies (ICTs) to arrange tasks and collaboration.

1. Remote work: employees can carry out their tasks outside the organization's physical boundaries while still remaining connected through digital technologies such as the internet, laptops, and online messaging platforms.Telework, telecommuting, e-working, and work from home are also used to describe similar arrangements where workers are physically away from the employer's site but are also able to work through information and communication technologies. These arrangements can be full-time or part-time and typically prioritize flexibility and autonomy as long as tasks can be supported by appropriate technology.
2. Hot desking: employees do not have permanently assigned desks and instead use any available workstation on a first-come, first-served basis. Hot desking is very common in hybrid work environments, where employees can alternate between remote and on-site work, allowing organizations to accommodate changing office attendance and manage workspace utilization. There are multiple variants of hot desking, including free-seating systems, reservation-based "Hoteling," departmental hotdesking within a specific team, and zone-based layouts that group different types of work activities into distinct areas.
3. Hybrid work: a flexible work arrangement where employees can complete part of their duties offsite using digital tools and part on-site at the employer's workplace. Remote work is commonly managed from home or another offsite location and is combined with periodic in-person attendance, allowing tasks to be distributed in different locations. Many organizations have adopted hybrid work as a flexible work model and professional guidance tool for employees, who generally value this arrangement for its balance between adaptable locations and continued access to in-person collaboration and workplace resources.
4. Virtual team: remote work groups with multiple members operating from different locations. These teams rely on tools such as video conferencing, messaging platforms, and shared digital workspaces for managing tasks, exchanging information, and making decisions. Virtual teams can span multiple countries and time zones, and may also include culturally diverse members who rarely meet in person, making communication technology a core element in their tasks and collaboration.

== Drivers ==
The importance of using virtual workplaces depends on technological, socioeconomic, and environmental factors that have reshaped how organizations manage their systems. Advancements in remote communication and cloud-based tools has made connecting online seamless for employees, and the rise of globalization has also increased the demand for virtual teams in many locations. Workforce expectations have also changed to value flexibility, independence, work-life balance, office space and energy costs, making hybrid models a very convenient approach. Natural disasters and pandemics have also pressured organizations to move away from conventional offices and continue their tasks online to save on costs and damages. These factors collectively explain why virtual workplaces have become viable mainstream models instead of temporary alternatives.

=== Office space costs ===
Office space has become a major expense for many organizations, and virtual meetings can save money by being a direct substitute of meeting face to face. One response has been to reduce the amount of space each employee occupies; another is to increase the flexibility of the office's layout and design.

=== Fuel and energy costs ===
The expenses of the energy consumption to physically commute are increasing rapidly. Planners and public policymakers share a strong belief that remote work with a virtual workspace is one of the most sustainable and competitive modes of commuting in terms of travel time and cost, flexibility, and environmental impacts.

=== Technological advancements ===
Virtual workspaces have developed due to the rapid advancements in information and communication technologies (ICTs). Since the 1980s, the development of digital systems, cloud computing, and artificial intelligence has helped many teams to efficiently collaborate over multiple time zones and locations. Advanced digital platforms for videoconferencing, project management, and shared data storage now reproduce and even amplify many aspects of in-person workplaces. These technologies are beneficial for effective task management and improve trust and communication between virtual team members.

=== Globalization ===
The rise of globalization has increased the demand for distributed teams to work across physical boundaries. The need to perform tasks in different regions was important since organizations expanded their research and investments internationally. Virtual teams also allowed businesses to incorporate unique skills and maintain uninterrupted operations around the globe without geographic and temporal restrictions. Globalization has changed workplace practices through multicultural and time challenges, but it has also expanded creative opportunities and efficiency.

=== Workforce shifts ===
Workforce demographics and expectations have also changed in favor for virtual workplaces. Younger and digitally fluent professionals value the flexibility and viability of hybrid environments. Empirical research shows that the most employees who worked in virtual teams during the pandemic prefer to continue working in similar arrangements, displaying higher productivity and satisfaction results. These trends were encouraged by broader evolving opinions toward employee values and inclusive cooperation in modern organizations.

=== Pandemics and natural disasters ===
Global crises have greatly boosted transitions to virtual workplaces. The COVID-19 pandemic forced many organizations to quickly adopt digital tools, which lead to a massive surge in research studies on virtual teams and remote. This period promoted remote management in many industries and displayed that virtual workplaces are viable long-term work environments. Earlier natural disasters and health emergencies have also indicated the importance of online connection as a viable continuation strategy for workplace environments.

== Benefits and challenges ==
Virtual workplaces have reshaped how organizations manage their workforce, systems, and employee expectations. The flexibility of remote work arrangements offers various benefits from better productivity and resource management to saving budget costs and reduced environmental impact from less traveling. Remote work has also affected how employees perceive their flexibility and well-being, which has led to both positive and negative outcomes related to boundaries, priorities, and isolation. Virtual workplaces also presents new challenges to communication, team solidarity, trust, and integrity, especially with teams that are operating in different time zones and cultures. The effectiveness of virtual workplaces relies on efficient technology, how organization manage their workforce relationships, and the capabilities of teams to efficiently connect and collaborate in different locations for long periods of time.

=== Benefits ===
==== Operational, economic, and environmental benefits ====
Virtual workplaces can help organizations cut costs on physical infrastructure, commuting, and resource consumption. Research shows that remote work can support the same in-person tasks but, with the benefit of lowering energy use and transportation-related emissions. This also reduces office space requirements and related resource costs, which promotes more eco-friendly workplace environments. Virtual environments also give organizations access to global labor markets and specialized skills without geographic barriers, expanding their recruitment options and talent variety.

==== Flexibility and employee health ====
Remote arrangements offer flexible schedules and work-life balance for employees, which is beneficial for working in adaptable locations while reducing commuting issues and difficult work routines. This flexibility is not a universal benefit as research suggests that it can also cause stress and imbalance if personal and professional responsibilities are not properly managed.

==== Expanded talent opportunities ====
Virtual workplaces provide access to a global talent pool with a wide range of skills and perspectives for organizations. Diverse teams can also develop new skills and perspectives by connecting individuals with different backgrounds and knowledge bases. These advantages still need strategic planning to manage time zone, communication, and scheduling issues.

=== Challenges ===
==== Time zone and management issues ====
Virtual teams with members from multiple time zones can run into challenges with schedules, decisions, and task deadlines. Time zone differences can make tasks, meeting and working hours, and proper communication difficult to manage. These restrictions can also lead to some members working and participating more than others in dispersed teams, making coordination a major challenge.

==== Culture and language barriers ====
Different cultural backgrounds can lead to language issues, mixed expectations, and conflicting ideas when planning tasks in virtual teams. This can hurt a teams' trust and performance because verbal cues, gestures, and body language can be misinterpreted and cause tension between team members. Research shows that while cultural diversity does offer benefits, it won't automatically provide them without proper communication and understanding between team members.

==== Weak relationships and distrust ====
Remote environments can restrict normal interactions which usually build trust, relationships, and unity in teams. The lack of in-person contact can isolate members, weaken relationships, and create responsibility issues that can hurt confidence of the entire team. Since virtual teams mostly rely on videoconferencing and online messaging platforms, they may need to provide more effort into building trust and relationships.

==== Technology limitations ====
Virtual workplaces effectively depend on viable digital tools, proficiency, and stable internet connection, which can be difficult for users that don't have these resources in their respective locations. Heavily relying on digital platforms can be a detriment because some team members and employees might not have access to the required compatible devices or have the proper skills to use them, which can drastically affect how they perform and communicate in virtual teams and virtual workplaces.

== Virtual workplace software ==
- Project management software: tracks project progress to ensure complete tasks on time and achieve goals.
- Productivity management: ensures that remote workers are doing their work by using time-tracking tools and productivity reports.
- Video/Web conferencing: allows team access to face-to-face communication through video chat.
- Cloud storage: gives every employee a secure, centralized space to store data.
- Collaborative software: provides a virtual space for hybrid and remote teams to come together.
- Employee engagement: recognizes and rewards employee efforts to increase team engagement.
- Internet security: for a company's privacy, security, and anonymity when employees are online.
- Mental wellness: to help remote employees manage anxiety and stress.

== See also ==
- Virtual office
- Virtual team
