= Business travel =

Travel undertaken for work or business purposes

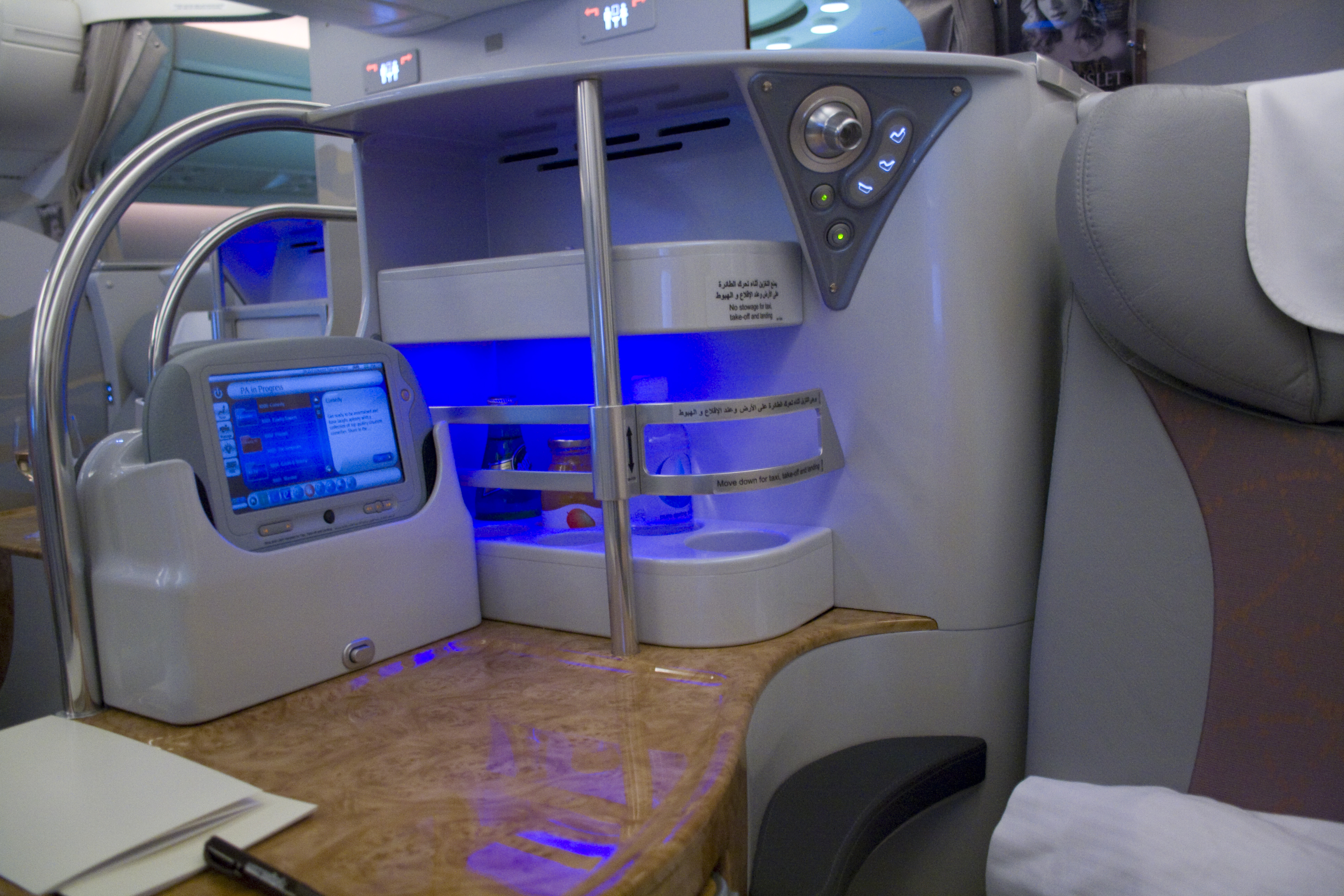
Business class seats (pictured aboard an Emirates aircraft) in aircraft usually provide more space and facilities than the standard class.

Business travel is travel undertaken for work or business purposes, as opposed to other types of travel such as leisure trips or daily commuting between one's home and workplace. It typically involves travelling from one's regular place of business – often by air, rail, or road – to attend meetings, conferences, trade shows, or other professional events that require in-person interactions.

People participating in jobs in which the primary activity involves travel, such as trucking; where the employee works in the field full time, such as wind turbine technicians; or where the employee's regular place of work changes periodically, such as travel nursing, are also types of business travelers.

In-person meetings have been viewed as critical for activities such as closing deals, networking, and conducting negotiations. However, advances in digital communication tools over the last few decades have reshaped this landscape. The rise of videotelephony and other virtual collaboration technologies has made it increasingly feasible to hold effective meetings without requiring employees to travel, causing a recent reduction in business travel.

More recently, widespread adoption of remote work and virtual meeting solutions has further contributed to a reduction in business travel. Despite these shifts, in-person contact remains valuable for complex negotiations, building rapport and certain types of team-building activities. While digital tools will continue to curb unnecessary travel, there will still be a place for face-to-face meetings where personal interaction is pivotal to achieving business objectives.

== Jobs involving business travel ==
Common careers involving periodic or frequent business travel include:

- Salespeople
- Sales engineers
- Executives
- Field engineers
- Project managers
- Trainers
- Consultants

Additionally, it is common to see doctors, nurses, and other medical professionals flying for work. Some lawyers, politicians, athletes, clergy, military, academics, and journalists conduct business travel on a regular basis. Many organisations require their staff to take account of a travel policy when deciding whether, how, and at what cost to travel for business. Such a policy is derived from both the organisation's policies on expenditure and value for money, and the exercise of its duty of care to its staff. The contribution of corporate travel policies to employees' job satisfaction has been noted by travel management and HR professionals. Whilst management approval for travel may be important in many businesses, it has been noted that some organizations are relaxing or ending the requirement for pre-trip approval.

== Positives to business travel ==
Business travel has many positive benefits for employees, the largest being the opportunity to see parts of the world at the company's expense. Today, many business travellers incorporate bleisure travel into their work travel, and other objectives can be pursued in parallel with business tasks. The Catholic church, for example, has noted that believers who travel for business purposes "should remember that they are itinerant heralds of Christ wherever they go and should act accordingly". Studies on cases imply that performance improves during travel. According to a survey published in 2020, 88% of small business owners enjoy business travel and 72% wished that they could travel more often.

Many travel providers offer business travel ancillary services such as airport parking, hotel, airport transfers, and lounge access, to enhance the comfort and convenience of air travel.

Business travelers typically accrue frequent flyer program points under their own names, rather than the names of the companies that paid for the travel and those points generally are not taxable as an income.

== Negatives to business travel ==
Employees who travel for work on a regular basis often experience loneliness, depression, and reduced mental health. In 2019, 1 in 5 business travelers reported business travel negatively affected their mental health.

Additionally, being away from home for extended periods can cause travellers to miss important family events, adding stress to personal relationships. This constant travel can disrupt not only personal lives but also impact physical health, as maintaining a consistent and healthy routine becomes challenging on the road. These factors combine to potentially decrease job satisfaction and overall productivity.

For instance, a 2025 joint research by Situ and YouGov into generational business travel behaviours found that 21% of Gen Z travellers said it was difficult to maintain a good work–life balance while working away, highlighting the strain regular travel can place on wellbeing and the need for suitable duty of care standards from companies.

== Trends in business travel ==
Since the advent of videotelephony, there have been predictions that it would lead to a reduction in business travel, but for decades adoption was low. During the first two decades of the 21st century, an increase in high-speed network connectivity and the ongoing maturation of the Internet created conditions which allowed videoconferencing to be more reliable and easier to use. By 2019, 33% of business professionals surveyed stated that videoconferencing reduced their business travel.

During the lockdowns and travel restrictions related to the Covid-19 pandemic, most business travel temporarily halted in 2020. As a result, adoption of videoconferencing accelerated. Videoconferencing substituted for in-person business meetings, saving companies billions of dollars in travel costs.

Many expected at the time that business travel would be permanently decreased due to the widespread adoption of videoconferencing, and through 2024 business travel expenditures remained 14% below pre-pandemic levels when adjusted for inflation. While some types of business travel have been reduced, an increase in fully-remote working has led to more travel for team-building purposes.

== See also ==
- Business tourism
- Environmental effects of aviation
- Travel management companies
- Corporate travel management

== Bibliography ==
- Davidson, Rob; Cope, Beulah (2003), Business Travel: Conferences, Incentive Travel, Exhibitions, Corporate Hospitality, and Corporate Travel, Pearson Education, ISBN 978-0-582-40444-1
- Beaverstock, Jonathan; Derudder, Ben; Faulconbridge; Witlox (2012), International Business Travel in the Global Economy, Ashgate Publishing, ISBN 978-1-4094-8843-9
- Swarbrooke, John; Horner, Susan (2012), Business Travel and Tourism, Routledge, ISBN 978-1-136-42306-2
