= Winkler County nurse whistleblower case =

2009 legal proceedings in Texas, US

Winkler County, Texas

The Winkler County nurse whistleblower case was a series of legal proceedings in West Texas concerning the retaliation against two nurses who submitted an anonymous state medical board complaint against a physician in 2009. The case attracted national attention for its implications on whistleblowing by nurses.

After witnessing what they believed to be unsafe medical care, nurses Anne Mitchell and Vicki Galle submitted an anonymous complaint against Dr. Rolando Arafiles to the Texas Medical Board (TMB). When he learned of the complaint, Arafiles spoke with the sheriff of Winkler County, alleging that the nurses' reports to the medical board constituted harassment. The sheriff investigated and obtained the TMB complaint, which provided enough information that Galle and Mitchell could be identified as the sources of the complaint. Galle and Mitchell were terminated from the hospital and faced criminal charges of misuse of official information. Galle's charges were dropped before trial and Mitchell was acquitted by a jury. In the aftermath of Mitchell's trial, Arafiles, several county officials and a hospital administrator all faced jail time for their roles in the retaliation against the nurses.

The case raised questions about the extent of whistleblower protection for healthcare providers who report patient care concerns to licensing authorities. Texas law included remedies against retaliation for whistleblowers, but no known U.S. state had whistleblower laws that addressed appropriate prosecutorial conduct. According to the Texas Nurses Association, "No one ever imagined that a nurse would be criminally prosecuted for reporting a patient care concern to a licensing agency." After the Mitchell case, protection from prosecution was incorporated into Texas whistleblower laws. The TMB stopped investigating anonymous complaints about physicians in September 2011.

== Background ==
The case originated at Winkler County Memorial Hospital (WCMH), a 15-bed hospital in Kermit, Texas. Mitchell and Galle were registered nurses at WCMH. The two nurses held multiple roles at the hospital and both worked there for more than 20 years. Galle was an administrator over quality improvement and utilization management for the hospital, while Mitchell served as its compliance officer. Galle and Mitchell also served as medical staff co-coordinators at WCMH. Mitchell held a part-time role as the county's emergency management coordinator. She also had experience as a travel nurse and as an instructor and director in a vocational nursing program.

In April 2008, Arafiles arrived at WCMH. He had earned a medical degree in the Philippines before coming to the United States; he continued his training in Baltimore and Buffalo. Texas issued a medical license to him in 1998. The year before Arafiles came to Winkler County, the TMB expressed concerns about the manner in which he oversaw a physician assistant at a weight loss clinic and the way that he applied the clinic's patient care protocols. As a result, the TMB restricted his ability to supervise nurse practitioners and physician assistants for three years and fined him $1,000.

Mitchell and Galle became concerned about the appropriateness of Arafiles's medical decision making soon after he arrived at WCMH. The doctor's practice in Kermit included the use of alternative medicine therapies such as herbal remedies. Witnesses later said that Mitchell made comments at work which characterized Arafiles as a "witch doctor". Other coworkers said that Mitchell had legitimate concerns about the quality of the physician's patient care; they said that Mitchell first raised the issues with the hospital's administration, but that her concerns were not addressed. In one incident, Arafiles was alleged to have performed a skin graft on an emergency room patient even though he was not credentialed to perform surgery at the facility. Another patient came to the hospital with a crushed finger and Arafiles allegedly took a rubber tip off of a pair of medical scissors and stitched it onto the patient's finger.

Mitchell and Galle sent an anonymous complaint to the TMB detailing their concerns with Arafiles' care of nine patients in 2008 and 2009. The letter said that the nurses feared losing their jobs if their identities were revealed in connection with the complaint. Arafiles became aware of the complaint and spoke to Winkler County Sheriff Robert Roberts, alleging that the complaint amounted to harassment. The TMB issued a copy of the complaint to Roberts with the understanding that it would only be used to investigate criminal activity by Arafiles. Roberts sent the complaint to Arafiles and to WCMH administrator Stan Wiley. As WCMH was a small hospital, details from the letter identified Mitchell and Galle as the sources of the complaint.

Roberts obtained warrants to search the nurses' computers and he found the letter to the TMB. The doctor had treated Roberts in the emergency room for a heart attack. Roberts credited Arafiles with saving his life. He referred to the doctor as "the most sincerely caring person I have ever met." Roberts later commented on the board report, saying, "If it’s made to destroy somebody’s reputation or forcing them to leave town, then I don’t believe it is good faith."

== Termination and criminal charges ==
Mitchell and Galle were terminated from WCMH in June 2009. A few days later, both nurses were arrested. They were charged with misuse of official information, a felony that carries the possibility of ten years imprisonment and fines up to $5,000. Roberts said that the nurses filed the complaint to carry out a personal vendetta rather than as a good faith reporting of facts. He also noted that Mitchell and Galle sent the medical records of ten patients to the TMB without their consent; however, the reports did not include the names of patients, and medical board reports are exempt from patient privacy laws.

The case attracted national attention in July 2009 when the American Nurses Association (ANA) and Texas Nurses Association (TNA) began to raise awareness of the plight of the nurses. Galle later said, "We didn't have any support - emotional or financial - until TNA and ANA stepped in." TNA filed a complaint with the Texas Department of State Health Services (DSHS) that resulted in an onsite investigation of the hospital. By February 2010, the TNA Legal Defense Fund had collected more than $45,000 in donations to the defense of Galle and Mitchell. TMB executive director Mari Robinson commented that such prosecution could have "a significant chilling effect" on the reporting of physician practice issues.

The charges against Galle were dropped before her case went to trial. Mitchell's case was tried by county attorney Scott Tidwell, a political supporter of Roberts and the personal attorney for Arafiles, in February 2010. Both the TMB executive director and the county attorney in nearby Andrews County discouraged Tidwell from trying the case. At trial, Mitchell did not testify. The relationship between Arafiles and Roberts was explored during the proceedings. Arafiles introduced Roberts to a supplement-selling program known as Zrii, and recommended the supplements to his patients. Roberts sold the supplements, but he said that his friendship with Arafiles had not impacted his actions with the nurses and that he did not have a business relationship with Arafiles.

Attorneys with the office of the Texas Attorney General took on Mitchell's case after being contacted by the TMB. Assistant Attorney General David Glickler later said that the case was the most bizarre he had seen in an 11-year stint with the office. "We're used to dealing with cases where public officials have enriched themselves at the expense of the office and the public trust, like bribery and theft. But there was no financial benefit to the bad actors in this case." The jury returned with a not guilty verdict after an hour of deliberation. Those present in the courtroom said that each juror approached Mitchell after the verdict and hugged her. In comments he made after the trial, jury foreman Harley Tyler said he wondered why the nurses were arrested. ANA president Rebecca Patton said that the verdict was "a resounding win on behalf of patient safety."

== Aftermath ==
TNA said that state laws, including the Texas Nursing Practice Act and the Public Employee Whistleblower Law, gave any health care provider the right to report concerns about the patient care of other providers. Under these protections, a termination could be presumed improper if it occurred within 60 days of filing such a complaint. Mitchell and Galle filed a civil lawsuit against Winkler County, WCMH, Wiley, Roberts, Tidwell and Arafiles. The lawsuit alleged violations of civil rights, breaches of due process and improper termination.

A few months after Mitchell's trial, Galle and Mitchell split a $750,000 settlement in the civil suit. The nurses, who both live in Jal, New Mexico, were unable to find employment in nursing after being terminated from WCMH. After signing the settlement, Wiley reinforced his support of Arafiles, saying, "He’s done a lot of good in this county. If you have a heart attack or anything of that nature in the emergency room, he is definitely the doctor that you want to take care of you."

Several officials faced criminal charges for their involvement in the prosecution or termination of Galle and Mitchell. Wiley, who had terminated Galle and Mitchell after they submitted the complaint, was the first to go to trial. He had been indicted on two felony counts of retaliation, and he pleaded guilty to the lesser of the two charges. He was sentenced to 30 days in jail and a $2,000 fine and agreed to cooperate in the prosecution of other involved officials. Wiley submitted his resignation from the hospital in August 2010, but the WCMH board of directors declined to accept it. He resigned again in October 2010.

Roberts was convicted on two counts of misuse of official information, two counts of retaliation and two counts of official oppression. In June 2011, he was sentenced to 100 days in jail, four years of felony probation and a $6,000 fine. After the sentence, Roberts was removed as sheriff and forced to surrender his license as a peace officer. Convicted on similar charges, Tidwell was removed from office and sentenced to 120 days in jail, ten years of probation and a $6,000 fine. Tidwell's trial publicly uncovered a 2004 guilty plea he entered after being charged with soliciting a prostitute. DSHS assessed a $15,850 fine against the hospital for inadequate supervision of Arafiles and illegal termination of Galle and Mitchell.

By mid-2011, Arafiles had moved his practice to East Texas and was affiliated with Cozby Germany Hospital in Grand Saline. A hospital administrator there said that she had looked into some of the allegations against Arafiles that she found on the Internet but that no one had formally complained to her about the doctor. In November 2011, Arafiles entered a guilty plea on two counts of misuse of official information. Two other charges were dismissed and a pending indictment for aggravated perjury was dropped. Arafiles was forced to surrender his medical license, sentenced to 60 days in jail and five years of probation, and assessed a $5,000 fine. Arafiles died in January 2014.

Several of the people involved in the nurses' case had assumed new employment by the summer of 2012. Mitchell found a position in New Mexico working with the developmentally disabled. Galle, who said in 2010 that the case had "derailed our careers", entered early retirement. Galle and Mitchell earned the Dean's Advocacy Award from the Texas Tech University Health Sciences Center in 2010. Wiley left Winkler County for Lubbock. Tidwell appealed the revocation of his license to practice law but in 2014 he resigned from the bar rather than facing further disciplinary action.

New legislation stopped the TMB from investigating anonymous complaints concerning physicians as of the fall of 2011. The change was seen as a victory by physicians rights groups, who said that it would promote accountability in the investigations of physicians. Other groups worried that the new law would discourage the reporting of legitimate complaints against physicians. The board received 6,849 complaints in 2010; four percent of the complaints were submitted anonymously.

== See also ==
- Nursing ethics
- Philosophy of healthcare
