= Bleisure travel =

Business and leisure travel simultaneously

Bleisure travel (UK: /ˈblɛʒər/; US: /ˈbliːʒər/) is a portmanteau of business and leisure. It refers to the practice of combining business travel with leisure activities, typically by extending a business trip to include personal time.

This phenomenon has been studied since 2011, and from that year on a report shows that bleisure travel has been maintaining a constant growth, accounting for 7% of all business trips.

== Terminology and origins ==
The term bleisure was first used in 2009 in a trend report published by The Future Laboratory, co-authored by Jacob Strand and Miriam Rayman. The term bizcation is also used in a similar context to describe business trips that include vacation time.

== Bleisure traveller profiles ==
Bleisure travellers can be described as "individuals who combine leisure with professional business obligations when abroad".

The elements characterising bleisure travellers are different, and this makes it difficult to draw a defined profile of these individuals. Bleisure is a widespread practice among US travellers, especially for those working in the technology, healthcare, and public administration sectors. A report shows that US traveller adds bleisure in about half of the cases, 52% for International trips and 42% for domestic ones. The main reasons for travelling are conferences and conventions, team building, client meetings and presentations.

Bleisure travellers could be grouped according to various aspects, in particular gender, age, and trip frequency.

Research indicates that females would be more likely than males to take bleisure trips. In both groups 20% of travellers would take one or more bleisure trips in a year, however women register higher rate: 8.5% against 6.8% of men. (Note: To explain this observation, CWT have looked at the average number of bleisure trips per traveller per year, this was roughly the same value for both genders (1.4). However, women take overall fewer business trips than men, on average. This difference in the total amount of business travel is responsible for the higher bleisure rate measured in the female population.)

Younger travellers (between 20 and 25) look significantly more likely to add weekends to their business trips, measuring a rate close to 15%. This result is two or three times higher than those for 45–50 age interval. (Note: To explain this finding, CWT calculated the average number of bleisure trips in each segment. Across the age range 20 to 65, this varies from 1.3 to 1.5 bleisure trips/year. At the same time, the amount of total travel varies much more significantly (+2 trips/year), from the 20–25 to the 45–50 age interval. The larger denominator in the bleisure rate is thus responsible for the lower values observed in the 45–50 group. Interpretation: these results show that travellers appear to have fixed capacity for bleisure: when they do it, they take one or two bleisure trips per year, almost irrespective of how much they travel. In other words, bleisure does not scale with the total amount of travel.) Millennial travellers deserve a special attention because they appear to be the individuals shaping the future of business travel, nearly twice likely to travel for business than Baby boomers. Millennials may work from home often or during the evening hours, and dedicate traditional working hours to leisure activities. In comparison to other age groups, Millennials are more likely to take bleisure trips. However, it is not clear whether this reflects unique preferences or transitory life events. (Note: Do take more bleisure trips than other generations did in their 20s and 30s? Or will Millennials take much fewer bleisure trips in later years? It seems possible that Millennials are actually different. One observation in particular would reinforce this idea: When business travellers have children, they seem to be equally likely to extend their trip, compared to those who do not have them. This would suggest that, when Millennials will have families in greater numbers, they may still take bleisure trips)

Frequent travellers taking 20 trips or more per year seem to be less than 5% likely to take a bleisure trip during the year, they would account for 8% of all bleisure trips. By contrast, one third of all bleisure trips would be taken by employees travelling once a month.

== Factors influencing the phenomenon ==
It seems evident that Millennials workers are increasingly demanding bleisure from their work trip. Despite the state-of-the-art technology available nowadays, Millennials still prefer face-to-face meetings to get business done, therefore travel is still important for business companies.

Worldwide, more than one in three business travellers will add a leisure component to at least one of their business trips this year (2021), said Jeanne Liu of the Global Business Travel Association.

Bleisure travel looks as a good opportunity to save on travel expenses, mostly for those who do not take a lot of vacation: 66% of US business traveller spend more money on leisure activities because of the money they save on travel. 60% take bleisure trips because do not have a lot of regular vacations. To decide whether to turn a business travel into bleisure or not, the employee takes into consideration travelling to exciting destinations, additional costs required to extend the trip, how close the trip is to the weekend, the number of nights they must stay for business, how affordable the hotel is, whether they have friends or family in the area, whether they can bring friends or family along. The general trend would indicate the addition of one or two days as the most frequent option, only 23% of bleisure travellers would extend their trips for more than three days. In many cases leisure days equal (37%) or even exceed business days (42%). The length of the business trip seems to be a crucial factor when considering extending the trip in 62% of cases. In particular, when business days are more than three, bleisure travellers are not only likely to extend the trip, but also to visit different cities in the area.

== Bleisure in a post-pandemic world ==
A 2018 Expedia study found that more than 60% of business trips were extended for leisure purposes. But the concept of any travel largely ground to a halt in 2020 due to the COVID-19 pandemic and uncertainty of how the virus spreads and stay-at-home orders in the US and beyond.

The domestic pattern seems to be the one that will reach major growth in bleisure in the post-corona world. In addition, the new working conditions proved that most employees can effectively work remotely at any time. This contributed to raising the employee-employer trust relation and will allow an increase in bleisure travelling.

In the investigation "COVID-19 and the bleisure travellers: An investigation on the aftermaths and future implications" reported that the 30 business travelers interviewed. They want to return to hotels but with spaces open to nature, large terraces with spaces where they could disconnect from work. They would rather stay in a cabin than in a 5-star hotel, to enjoy nature, for example.

== Advantages for employee and companies ==
For the employees:

- Compromise between work duties and leisure time;
- Career development.
- Possibility to bring family or friend with them;
- Improvement of their well-being;

For the companies:

- Improvement of the knowledge about the culture of the location they're visiting that would simplify business negotiations;
- Possibility to have happier and therefore more productive employees;
- Discounted rate offered by the hotels;
- Opportunity to recruit new workers and attempting to retain current ones.

== Main activities and destinations ==
The more likely bleisure destinations are cities offering a combination of different elements, which could allow the travellers to add leisure time to their business trip, such as sightseeing locations, sport venues and cultural events.

Bleisure activities can include adventure tourism, cultural tourism, and eco-tourism. Some use destination management companies (DMCs) to organize such activities.

The difference between the origin and the destination city seems to affect bleisure rates: in the case of domestic trips, the amount of bleisure is expected to be low because the two cities should be easily accessible and share similar culture. On the other hand, long intercontinental trips would offer the chance to know realities that are different from ordinary. Researches seem to confirm this trend: bleisure trips would account for 5.2% of the domestic trips and 9.7% of the international ones. The highest bleisure rate (18.4%) appears in international trips when the origin and destination cities are located in different geographical regions.

The top bleisure cities in US are: Honolulu (above 20%), Miami, Orlando, Las Vegas (12–15%) New York City, San Francisco, Los Angeles, San Diego, and Fort Lauderdale (9–12%). In Europe rates looks lower, this could be due to the shorter domestic and continental routes: Lisbon, Barcelona, Nice, Istanbul (8–11%), London, Dublin, Amsterdam, Moscow, Rome, Geneva, Paris, Madrid (6–8%).

"The 2019 Bleisure barometer: Asia's best cities for work and recreation" which measures the opinions of 1,500 business travelers who visited Asia through a quantitative online survey. Full-time employees, who traveled to one of 26 Asia-Pacific cities during 2019 and the prior 24 months. According to the report, 74% carry out activities in middle management: Vice-presidency, general management, technical support: Scientific-engineering, IT; and 26% of managers: CEO, partners, investors. 19% represent companies that bill between 50 and 100 million US dollars annually. 16% represent those that invoice less than 50 million US dollars per year. Of those surveyed, 58% identify themselves as "millennial business travelers" born between 1981-2001, 60% are male travelers and 39% are women. Among the findings, it stands out that Tokyo obtains the highest score in three indicators: Quality of international links, availability of consumer goods and services, and opportunity for cultural experiences and leisure in general. It stands out as the best “bleisure” “five-star” city in the Asian continent for 2019; being a highly developed financial center thanks to its GDP (gross domestic product).

== Corporate policy ==
Given that bleisure travel is a rising phenomenon, there is still no official regulation, therefore extending business trips for bleisure would have to be decided by management on a case-by-case basis. Some preventive measures could be followed in advance to avoid misunderstanding.

- Companies have to differentiate between business and non-business amenities and declare what they are willing to pay for;
- Employees have to define when the business travel ends and when the leisure travel starts;
- Company and employees must arrange corporate travel insurance.

== See also ==
- Hush trip
