= Canadian Telework Association =

Organization promoting telework and telecommuting in Canada

The Canadian Telework Association (CTA) is an organization promoting telework and telecommuting in Canada. It was founded in 1997, and since then, it has grown to include over 1000 members, most of which are individuals, corporations, and academic institutions. The association does not accept funding or donations and does not charge fees for membership.

The founder of this association has since retired and the websites have been closed.
