= Zoom town =

Populated area, which remote workers are moving into

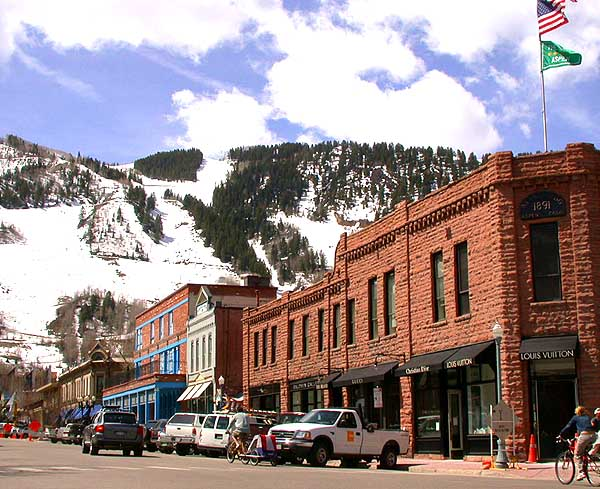
Downtown Aspen, Colorado, an example of a "Zoom town" which has a high number of remote workers that take advantage of outdoor activities such as skiing

A Zoom town is a community that experiences a significant population increase as due to an influx of remote workers. The term became popular during the COVID-19 pandemic. The population growth of Zoom towns has had significant economic implications. The name is a play on "boomtown", a community that undergoes sudden and rapid growth, and Zoom, the videoconferencing software.

== Definition ==
In 2020, the COVID-19 pandemic led to a significant migration to previous “getaway communities” and small towns near attractions such as ski resorts in conjunction with the increase in popularity of remote work. In March 2020, the pandemic forced many workers to transfer to remote work, and a September Gallup poll showed that nearly 60% of workers remained working remotely full or part time, and two-thirds of employees wanted to stay that way, giving them more flexibility in where to live. Before the pandemic, only 10% or fewer of workers in the United States worked remotely full-time.

People working remotely found they could attain some "normalcy" by hiking, biking, skiing, snowshoeing, and other outdoor activities while cities were locked down, and they did not need to commute to work. A November study by the Pew Research center found that as a result of the pandemic, around 5% of Americans had moved in the several months prior to the study.

== Impact ==
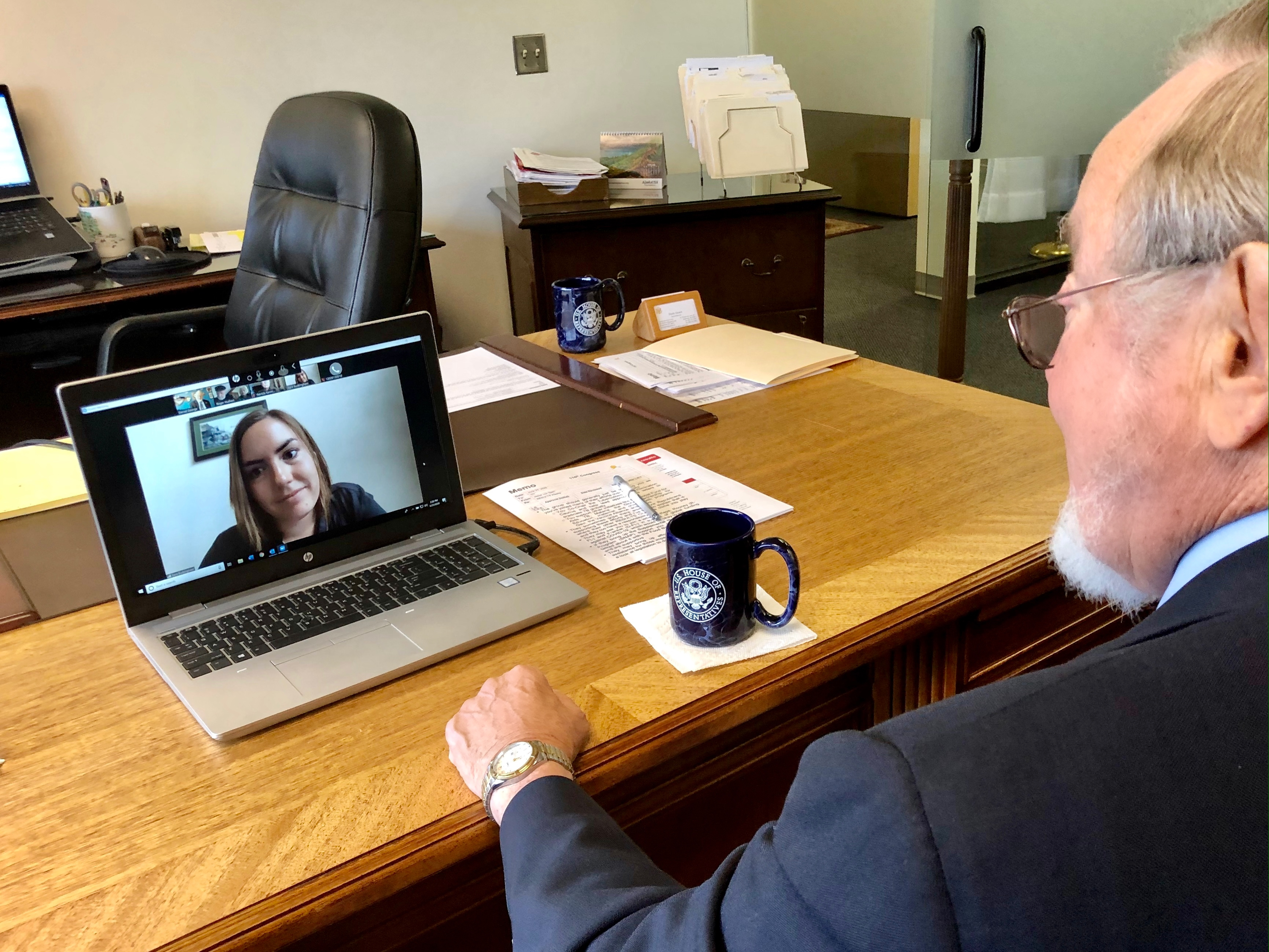
U.S. representative from Alaska Don Young talks to a woman over Zoom.

In the United States, locations such as The Hamptons, New York; Cape Cod, Massachusetts; Aspen, Colorado; Bethel, Maine; and Truckee, California — which are usually considered vacation destinations — saw large spikes in people moving there. Truckee for instance saw a 23% increase. On the other hand, cities such as San Francisco, Seattle, and New York City, saw rent levels plunge. This put strain on towns which were not used to handling so many people, with problems such as a lack of affordable housing, availability of public transit, congestion, and income inequality, which have been traditionally thought of as larger city problems.

In the United States, many small western mountain towns have seen significant numbers of very wealthy migrants, leading some observers to call the wealthy zoom towns a "Billionaire Wilderness," taken from the name of a book by Yale University sociologist Justin Farrell. Although the trend was already underway, the sudden rapid migration accelerated it, and led to calls to carefully manage the situation to avoid the places being "loved to death". Many of the areas have tight housing regulations which prevent construction booms, driving up prices for houses already built, as in the Hamptons, which saw a rise in housing prices of up to 25%, and Truckee, which is up 50%. Not all areas experiencing booms see it as a problem, however, and some have even launched initiatives specifically designed to appeal to remote workers. It is expected that remote workers will bring significant tax revenue and will want to give back to their new communities. West Virginia has offered $12,000 to people who move to the state and work remotely. The Zoom town relocation phenomenon peaked in the pandemic's initial years; states like Montana saw extreme net-positive migration flows in 2021. This trend started to shift in later years from initially popular mountain towns to lower-cost, mid-sized cities in the Southeast.

According to the Canadian magazine Maclean's, population-related statistical data in Canada "shows that from July 1, 2019 to July 1, 2020, Toronto and Montreal posted record population losses, while Halifax grew the second-fastest of any major urban area, and Moncton also grew faster than average. Housing prices have soared as people across Canada buy property in the Maritimes sight unseen through virtual tours, with Fredericton’s U-Haul dealer struggling to keep up with all the people renting moving trucks in Ontario and Quebec and trying to drop them off at its lot."

In Europe, some countries such as Italy, Romania, Poland, Latvia, and Bulgaria, which had experienced "brain-drain" in preceding years, found young professionals return home as they began working remotely, a trend which was further encouraged by some governments in the form of tax breaks for returning citizens. Other places have set up working visa programs specifically for remote workers, such as Anguilla, Barbados, Georgia, Estonia, and Croatia. Following the same trend, Italy began paying people to move to its more remote villages in order to revitalize them. One study early in the pandemic of 30 countries around the world showed that countries in the so-called "developed world" had the easiest shift to working remotely, with Luxembourg coming in at the top, while Nigeria was at the bottom.

Richard Florida and Adam Ozimek wrote in an article in The Wall Street Journal that the shift is expected to have significant economic implications. Before the pandemic, very few companies allowed their employees to do work entirely remotely, and many had a negative perception of remote work, but the pandemic changed that. The "work-from-home experiment" was considered a "resounding – and somewhat unexpected – success" by management experts, and working remotely is expected to remain a significant part of the American workforce, and no longer be seen as a workplace "perk" for a handful of employees in a few more modern companies. Companies that have already announced that remote work will become permanent within their corporation include Twitter, Siemens, Shopify, Facebook, and State Bank of India. 74% of venture capitalists and venture-backed entrepreneurs expect their companies to remain remote for the majority of employees, if not all of them. Other possible effects of people moving to smaller towns include changes in transportation habits, as people drive cars less and feel it less of a necessity to own them, they may opt for ridesharing options if available, and may even increase the demand for self-driving cars.

== Examples of Zoom towns and regions ==
=== United States ===
- Aspen, Colorado
- Bellevue, Washington
- Bethel, Maine
- Bozeman, Montana
- Cape Cod, Massachusetts
- Carlsbad, California
- Carmel, Indiana
- Cary, North Carolina
- Centennial, Colorado
- Greater Danbury, Connecticut
- Fremont, California
- Frisco, Texas
- Gilbert, Arizona
- The Hamptons, New York
- Henderson, Nevada
- Hudson Valley, New York
- Lake Tahoe, California
- League City, Texas
- Olathe, Kansas
- Roseville, California
- Sandy Springs, Georgia
- Thousand Oaks, California
- Torrance, California
- Truckee, California

=== Elsewhere ===
- Bansko, Bulgaria
- Essaouira, Morocco
- Moncton, New Brunswick, Canada
- Santa Fiora, Italy
- Santo Stefano di Sessanio, Italy
- Zadar, Croatia

== See also ==
- Impact of the COVID-19 pandemic
- Digital nomad
