= Nursing shortage =

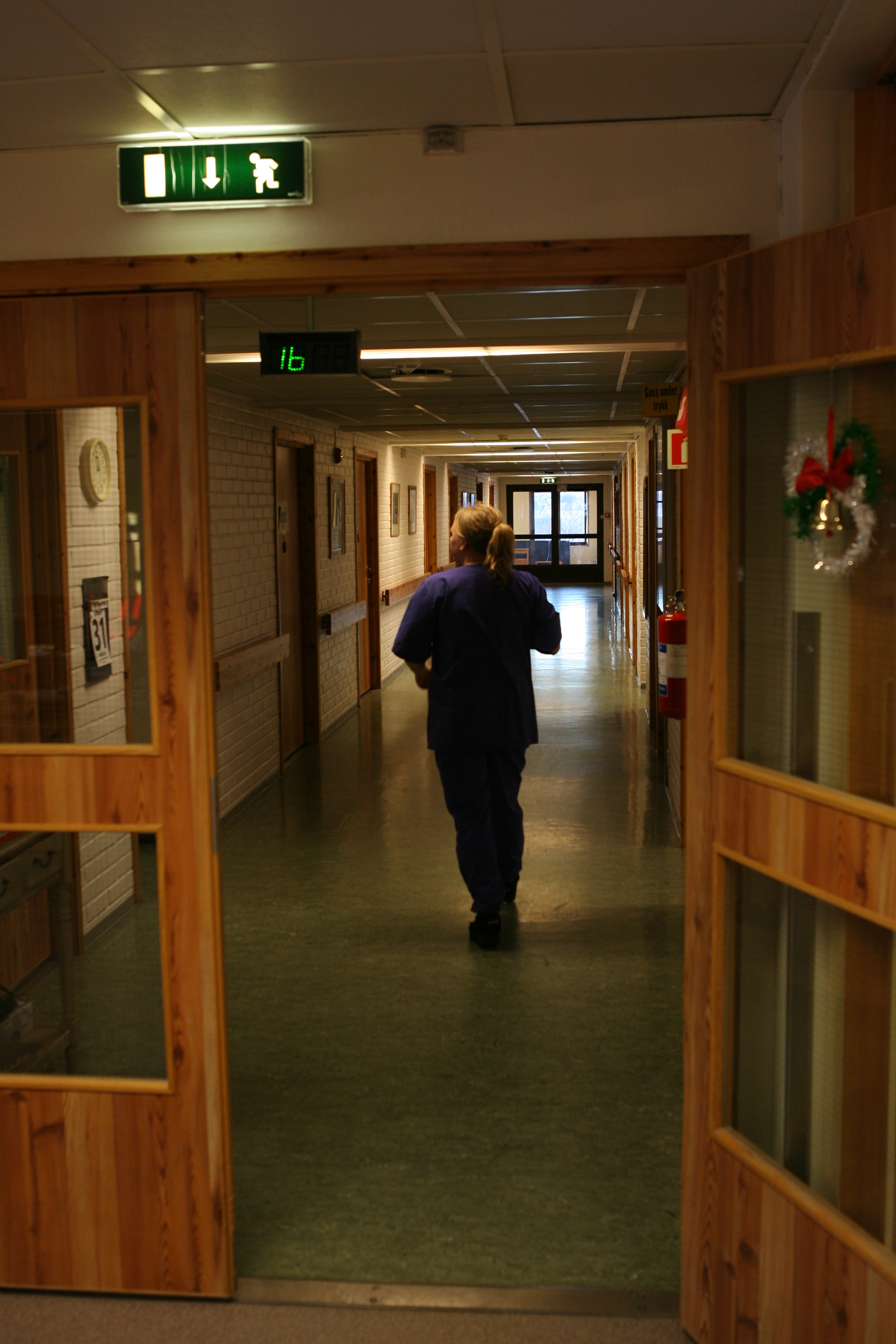
Nursing shortage is a problem in several districts of Norway. This nurse is employed at a nursing home.

A nursing shortage occurs when the demand for nursing professionals, such as registered nurses (RNs), exceeds the supply locally—within a healthcare facility—nationally or globally. It can be measured, for instance, when the nurse-to-patient ratio, the nurse-to-population ratio, the number of job openings necessitates a higher number of nurses than currently available, or the current number of nurses is above a certain age where retirement becomes an option and plays a factor in staffing making the workforce in a higher need of nurses. The nursing shortage is global according to 2022 World Health Organization fact sheet.

The nursing shortage is not necessarily due to the lack of trained nurses. In some cases, the scarcity occurs simultaneously with increased admission rates of students into nursing schools. Potential factors include lack of adequate staffing ratios, lack of placement programs for newly trained nurses, inadequate worker retention incentives and inability for students to complete schooling in general. This issue can continue further into the workforce with veteran workers as well as burnout in the healthcare field is one of the largest reasons for the nursing shortage in the U.S. today. The lack of nurses overall though can play a role in the shortages across the world today.

As of 2006, the WHO estimated a global shortage of almost 4.3 million nurses, physicians and other health human resources worldwide—reported to be the result of decades of underinvestment in health worker education, training, wages, working environment and management. These will continue to be reoccurring issues if not disentangled now.

A study in 2009 by Emergency Nurse has predicted that there will be a shortage of 260,000 registered nurses by the year 2025. A 2020 World Health Organization report urged governments and all relevant stakeholders to create at least 6 million new nursing jobs by 2030, primarily in low- and middle-income countries, to off set the projected shortages and redress the inequitable distribution of nurses across the world.

While the nursing shortage is most acute in countries in South East Asia and Africa, it is global, according to 2022 World Health Organization fact sheet. The shortage extends to the global health workforce in general, which represents an estimated 27 million people. Nurses and midwives represent about 50% of the health workforce globally.

== 2022 overview ==
A March 2022 WHO fact sheet reported that about 50% of the global health workforce was experiencing a global shortage. Of the 27 million people who make up that workforce, approximately 50% are nurses and midwives. This is most acute in countries in South East Asia and Africa.

== Causes ==
Nursing shortage is an issue in many countries. To interpret the problem, psychological studies have been completed to ascertain how nurses feel about their career in the hope that they can determine what is preventing some nurses from keeping the profession as a long-term career. In a study completed by sociologist Bryan Turner, the study found that the most common nursing complaints were:

- subordination to the medical profession on all matters, even over standardized regulations
- difficult working conditions

A report from the Commonwealth of Australia identified a few other matters that led to nurse dissatisfaction:

- constant schedule changes
- work overloads due to high number of patients and paperwork, according to a 2002 journal article;
- shift work
- lack of appreciation by superiors
- lack of provided childcare
- inadequate pay
- lack of interest to join the field in countries with inadequate pay, according to a 2020 "systematic review and meta-analysis";

Another study found that nurse dissatisfaction stemmed from:

- conflicting expectations from nurses and managers due to regulation of cost
- inability to provide comprehensive nursing care due to work
- loss of confidence in the health care system, based on a 2014 Russian non-academic paper.

A couple articles mention how nursing burnout could happen from the demand of being compliant with the technology used in the healthcare setting:

- The Electronic Medical Record (EMR) is becoming much more popular to use for health professionals; but this is removing health professionals from the direct patient care areas.
- The nursing population is also an aging population, with approximately one million registered nurses older than the age of 50. These seasoned nurses may struggle with the evolving technology and leave the profession.
- Other consequences of utilizing the EMR is the difficulty in adoption and implementation, this can include disruption of organizational workflows, tool failure, maintenance issues, and users being resistant to change.

Another study reported in a 2020 British Journal of Nursing article, conducted by Peate and colleague, found that the inability to provide effect and efficient care to patents caused nurses to question their job abilities and fear that their job was at stake.

In many jurisdictions in the United States, by 2003, administrative/government health policy and practice had changed very little for decades. A 2003 Nursing Science Quarterly article said that one of the priorities at that time was cost-cutting and that patient loads were uncontrolled, and nurses were rarely consulted when recommending health care reform. As of 2004, the major reason for nurses planning to leave the field, according to a 2004 Emerging Infectious Diseases journal article, was because of working conditions. With the high turnover rate, the nursing field does not have a chance to build up the already frustrated staff. The American Nurses Association website has listed many strategies on how to combat thee grouping nursing turnover rate. Eliminating Mandatory overtime, provide employee wellness programs and creating a flexible culture are just a few. These changes would help nurses receive the help and benefits to ensure a better work environment. Aside from the deteriorating working conditions, the real problem is "nursing's failure to be attractive to the younger generation." A 2004 Journal of Nursing Education article said that there was a decline in interest among college students to consider nursing as a probable career. At that time, more than half of working nurses said they "would not recommend nursing to their own children" and a little less than a quarter would advise others to avoid this as a profession altogether.

In a 2006 Journal of Advanced Nursing article, Australian nursing researchers John Buchanan and Gillian Considine described hospitals as "being run like a business" with "issues of patient care… of secondary importance." Emotional support, education, encouragement and counseling are integral to the everyday nursing practice. However, these practices are not easily quantified and are considered by managers as unjustified cost for the patients, who are viewed as consumers. Therefore, only clinical responsibilities, such as medication administration, dressing changes, foley catheter insertions, and anything that involves tangible supplies, are quantified and incorporated into the organization budget and plan of care for the consumers.

In Australia, the capacity for students to complete programs of professional experience placements known as clinical placements have been a major barrier for nursing and other health students. Placement poverty has been described as one major barrier for healthcare course completion. An editorial published in 2024 highlighted factors surrounding insufficient and inequitable government supports which could be a barrier to students completing healthcare degrees and entering the workforce. Research studies have demonstrated that placement poverty is a significant burden to Australian healthcare students including nursing students. The Australian Government launched the Commonwealth Prac Payment in 2025 to support students in nursing, midwifery, teaching, and social work programs of study during clinical placements. The Commonwealth Prac Payment has faced criticism for its inadequate financial support, lack of access by the broader healthcare student population.

By 2004, the undersupply of nurses in health care facilities in the United States was predicted to become even more critical over the following twenty years. Along with more aggressive "efforts to attract and retain nurses" in the United States, many institutions increasingly recruited foreign nurses. While this created a domestic and international lucrative business opportunity, a 2004 Health Affairs journal article raised ethical concerns in terms of how nursing shortages affected African countries and the Philippines, for example, as American recruiters risked diminishing their own domestic supply of trained nurses. In response, in 2010 the WHO's World Health Assembly adopted the Global Code of Practice on the International Recruitment of Health Personnel, a policy framework for all countries for the ethical international recruitment of nurses and other health professionals.

=== Impacts of nursing shortage ===
Nursing shortages (including low hospital-level nurse-to-patient ratios) have been linked to the following effects:

- Increased nurses' patient workloads
- Increased risk for error, thereby compromising patient safety
- Increased risk of spreading infection to patients and staff
- Increased risk of adverse outcomes such as falls, pneumonia, shock, cardiac arrest, and urinary tract infections
- Increased risk for occupational injury
- Increase in nursing turnover, thereby leading to greater costs for the employer and the health care system
- Increase in nurses' perception of unsafe working conditions, contributing to increased shortage and hindering local or national recruitment efforts

There is an alarming increase in the number of nurses suffering from nurse burnout due to the extreme stress caused by nursing shortages. Extensive amounts of stress on the human body lead to psychological, mental and, physical health effects such as headaches, body aches, sleep disruption, chronic fatigue which in the long run can lead to anxiety, depression, somatic symptoms.

Nursing shortages have an impact on the healthcare environment in all aspects of nursing, but it does impact other nurses directly causing the nursing community to face issues of burnout. Burnout is a feeling that nurses experience when an overwhelming amount of workload is placed on a nurse. Usually this causes nurses to experience exhaustion in many different aspects, a sense of not feeling like themselves, and a sense of not feeling accomplished enough. Sometimes, burnout can interfere with good professional behavior and play a factor in the quality of care nurses give their patients. The feeling of burnout tends to contribute to feelings of stress as well. In relation to burnout, nurses are known to experience sleep disturbance which consist of trouble falling asleep as well as experiencing poor quality sleep. Sleep disturbance correlates directly with stress and burnout presenting that nurses with a higher level of sleep disturbance have lower levels of stress management. The issue of burnout tends to be a common factor that many nurses face due to the stress from an overwhelming workload, which can make it hard for some nurses to fall in love with their career field. Poor working conditions can place nurses at a higher risk for being a victim of workplace violence, such as not taking the proper vacation time, causing increased patient exposure as well as stress and exhaustion. This can have a negative effect on patient care as some nurses may resort to bringing self-defense weapons to work to protect themselves.

== Global shortage and international recruitment ==
The nursing shortage takes place on a global scale. Australia, the UK, and the US receive the largest number of migrant nurses. Australia received 11,757 nurses from other countries between 1995 and 2000. The U.S. Immigration and Naturalization Service (INS) records show that more than 10,000 foreign nurses were given H-1A visas in the same time frame. The U.K. admitted 26,286 foreign nurses from 1998 to 2002.

Saudi Arabia also depends on the international nurse supply with 40 nations represented in its nurse workforce. Netherlands needed to fill 7,000 nursing positions in 2002, England needed to fill 22,000 positions in 2000, and Canada would need about 10,000 nursing graduates by 2011.

Country	Number of nurses	Density per 1,000 population	Year
Canada	309,576	9.95	2003
China	1,358,000	1.05	2001
India	865,135	0.80	2004
Japan	993,628	7.79	2002
New Zealand	31,128	8.16	2001
Nigeria	210,306	0.28	2003
Philippines	127,595	1.69	2000
United Kingdom	704,332	12.12	1997
United States of America	2,669,603	9.37	2000
Zimbabwe	9,357	0.72	2004

Source: Data from the World Health Organization (2006).

Country	Density of nurses per 10,000 population	Year of data registration
Canada	112.6	2023
China	36.7	2022
India	17.2	2020
Japan	129.8	2022
New Zealand	123	2023
Nigeria	16.5	2022
Philippines	47.9	2021
United Kingdom	95.5	2023
United States of America	133.8	2022
Zimbabwe	30.7	2022

Source: Nurse density per 10 000 (WHO) as of latest informations

In an American Hospital Association study, the cost to replace one nurse in the U.S. was estimated at $30,000–$64,000. This amount is likely related to the cost of recruiting and training nurses into the organization. Hiring foreign nurses is more financially taxing compared to hiring domestic-graduate nurses; however, facilities save money in the long run because foreign nurses have a contractual obligation to complete their term. The JACHO in the United States wrote in a 2002 research report on the shortage in the US that recruiting foreign trained nurses from abroad (not referring to those who reside in the United States already) does not help the global nursing shortage and, in fact, perpetuates it.

Countries that send their nurses abroad experience a shortage and strain on their health care systems.

In South Africa, accelerated recruitment by developed countries such as United States, United Kingdom and Australia has placed more pressure on the health care system due to prevalence of diseases, such as AIDS, and limited resources. Similar to the U.S., nurses who leave the organization are a financial disadvantage due to the need to fund recruiting and retraining of new nurses into the system. It has been estimated that every nurse who leaves South Africa is an annual loss of $184,000 to the country, related to the financial and economical impact of the nursing shortage.

The following table represents the number of nurses per 100,000-population in southern African countries.

Number of southern African countries	Number of nurses per 100,000 population
16	100
10	50
9	20
3	Less than 10

In India international migration has been considered as one of the reasons behind shortages of nursing workforce. Social, economic and professional reasons have been cited behind this shortfall.

Retention of nurses by sending (often developing) countries can be addressed by improving working conditions, minimizing wage differentials, and promoting medical tourism. Retention can also be promoted through educational activities to improve job satisfaction. There can be additional unintended impacts of nurses migration abroad. For example, there is growing evidence that physicians in the Philippines have shifted to the nursing field for better export opportunities. The World Health Organization (WHO) representative in Manila believes the government should invest more into its health sector as it is 3% of the Philippines' GDP. Others have suggested programs which require domestic service or employment upon graduation.

=== Ethical concerns ===
Foreign nurses that migrate from developing countries to fill the nursing shortage of developed nations pursue their own economic, career, and lifestyle interests, but there are risks. The media and scholars have remained relatively silent on the ethical concerns involving the potential exploitation of foreign nurses. On the level of national sovereignty and global equality, there are ethical concerns about the pull of developed nations on developing countries' skilled workers and assets. U.S. incentives such as signing bonuses can be seen as promoting brain drain. Activists have spread a new term for this: "Brain drain in the south, brain waste in the north." The president of the Philippines Nurse Association, George Codero, was quoted in a New York Times article as saying "The Filipino people will suffer because the U.S. will get all our trained nurses".

On an individual basis, foreign nurses are subject to exploitation by employers. In 1998 six Americans were charged with falsely obtaining H-1A visas and using them to employ Filipino nurses as nurse aides instead of registered nurses. In a case in 1996, a Catholic archdiocese employed some of these foreign nurses as nurse aides instead of nurses. In 2000, Filipino nurses in Missouri received $2.1 million for failure to receive proper wages that an American in the same position would receive. While these cases were brought to court, many similar situations are left unreported thereby jeopardizing the rights of foreign nurses. Foreign nurses have the tendency to receive less desirable jobs, such as entry-level positions, because of their immigrant status; they are excluded from jobs that would lead to facilities and are often not paid proper salaries.

Some U.S. health care facilities push to "ease restrictions" on the immigration law to increase the number of recruited foreign nurses. On the other hand, this recruitment practice is a temporary solution that does not fully address the nursing shortage as mentioned by American Nursing Association (ANA). Others have taken a stand on ethically recruiting foreign workers. New York University Medical Center was cited in The Search for Nurses Ends in Manila as believing that it is a "poaching exercise" to take nurses from countries in need of their citizens. The former health secretary, Dr. Galvez Tan, in reference to the doctors and nurses working for an American green card said, "There has to be give and take, not just take, take, take by the United States."

== Shortage by country ==
=== Canada ===
Across North America during the post-World War II years, there was a serious shortage of registered nurses. By the mid-1940s in Canada, the nursing shortage was approximately 8,700 and it was increasing along with health services in Canada and the number of hospital beds and hospitalizations. It was so severe that Vancouver General Hospital's newly built pavilion remained out-of-service because there were not enough registered nurses to staff it. The number of hospital beds across Canada increased from 1943 to 1952 by 26% and the number of admissions to hospitals increased by 74%. The nature of nursing was also changing with new and time-consuming responsibilities, such as the administration of penicillin. During that period, there was no unemployment for nurses, especially if they were willing to be mobile. However, working conditions for nurses were very poor, with low wages combined with long hours and nurse retention was challenging. As well, since almost all nurses were women, they had responsibilities at home they had to manage. By January 1943, 50% of Vancouver General Hospital's registered nurses were married women who had returned to work as nurses when encouraged by the hospital's administrators. In response to the shortage of nurses, volunteers were used and nursing courses were accelerated, and new categories of regulated nursing were added to registered nursing—"practical nurses" and "nursing assistants."

Because of the mid-twentieth century nursing shortage, nursing labour was reorganized and re-conceptualized. To expedite entry into nursing, debates were held across Canada about auxiliary nursing roles for assistants and practical nurses. At that time, a "utopia of nursing" referred to teams of nursing staff which included registered nurses and other regulated nursing and hospital worker support personnel. Some of these auxiliary positions were also open to First Nations women and other racialized groups.

Since at least 1998, the Canadian Federation of Nurses Unions (CFNU) have been calling for solutions to the nursing shortage in Canada. In 2005, registered nurses worked an estimated 18 million hours of overtime—both paid and unpaid, representing the "equivalent of 10,054 full-time positions". The nursing force had among the highest rates of "burnout, injury and illness." Citing a 2002 Canadian Nurses Association (CNA) study, they said that without new policies and direction, the projected shortage of registered nurses in 2011 would be 78,000 RNs and up to 113,000 by 2016. The report also noted that there was a "shortage of nursing faculty".

Based on various models used by Employment and Social Development Canada (ESDC)'s Occupational Projection System (COPS) team, some provincial governments, Canadian Nurses Association (CNA), and Statistics Canada on vacancies, the 2019 International journal of health planning and management article said that there was a shortage of nurses in Canada. In 2012, it was 2.6% and the projection for nursing professional shortages across Canada in 2022, was between 50,000 and 60,000. The article said that nursing shortages can be measured based on professional standards, projections, or supply and demand economics. Professional standards set the nurse to patient ratio. According to the Canadian Federation of Nurses Unions (CFNU) in 2014 an average nurse to patient ratio for Canada is 1:4. According to projection‐based shortage, a 2009 Canadian Nurses Association (CNA) report, the shortage of RNs in Canada would be approximately reach 60,000 full‐time equivalent (FTE) by 2022. The economic concept of nursing shortages considers supply and demand—how many nurses are available and what is the actual demand. As of 2019, there were limited statistics on the nursing labour market, particularly as related to vacancies. The 2019 paper said that these concepts—professional standards, projections, or supply and demand economics— were not being sufficiently used to measure nursing shortages; instead, most often, the indicator was "essentially the number of nurses per 1000 inhabitants".

==== Shortage of nurse educators ====
A 2014 study in Canada and another in 2019 confirmed that along with the shortage of nurses in Canada, there was also a national shortage of in academia, which reflects the global shortage identified in 2011 by the Institute of Medicine and in 2020 by The World Health Organization (WHO).

A 1967 journal article in Canadian Nurse predicted a severe future shortage of nurses in Canada unless the shortage of nursing faculty in undergraduate and graduate programs was remedied. In the mid-1960s some of the factors that contributed to a lack of retention and growth in nursing faculty included the rate at which professors reaching retirement age being matched by new and younger hires. There were much higher salaries for these individuals in non-academic professions. The workload for nursing faculty was excessive.

==== Pandemic-related nursing shortages ====
A 2022 review of how the pandemic impacted the 400,000 nurses in Canada, sponsored by the Royal Society of Canada and published in the FACETS journal said that by 2021, health job vacancies had increased by 56.9% since 2019 in Canada to a "record high of 100,300. The highest vacancy rate was experienced by hospitals. The report found that for decades, the "nursing labour market" was "under stress" but "widespread systemic change" did not occur. The pandemic-related workload increase combined with chronic stress represented a "tipping point of systemic burnout". Some of factors leading to the exodus of the nursing labour force included "workload, burnout, lack of structural value, the need for leadership and mentorship, and lack of flexibility, autonomy and voice laced with overt racism, discrimination, and gendered inequities," according to Annette Elliott Rose, one of the study's authors.

Due to a shortage of nurses, in March 2022, during the COVID-19 pandemic in Canada, the first of many unplanned closures of emergency rooms took place—the first such occurrence since 2006. By September 2022, across Canada there were "dozens of forced closures of emergency rooms took place because of insufficient staff. By May, Ontario Health reported emergency department "record-high wait times and patient volumes." Hospital administrators said that one of the reasons for hospital staff shortages is the retirement since 2018 of many healthcare workers who are over the age of fifty who cited "the pandemic and burnout as top reasons." Other administrators said staffing issues were a concern before the pandemic. While some raised concerns that nurses who left their profession because of the vaccine mandate had contributed to the shortage, one hospital CEO said the number of those who left for that reason was so small, it was a "non-issue". A September 2022, New York Times article said that nurses in Canada left the profession because of "unsafe working conditions, wage dissatisfaction, and burnout from the pandemic". Sixteen emergency departments had to close in September because of nursing shortages in Canada's "most populous province", Ontario. Ontario Council of Hospital Unions president said in August that the work force which had been working through the pandemic in an unsafe work environment, and had their wages cut, was "exhausted" and "demoralized".

In 2019, during the pandemic, under the premiership of Doug Ford, Bill 124—Protecting a Sustainable Public Sector for Future Generations Act was enacted placing an annual cap of 1% on most public sector employees, including nurses. This is lower than the inflation rate and according to opposition critics, represented a cut in salary. According to health care workers' unions, this contributed to the staff shortages. According to a 17 July 2022 Financial Accountability Office (FAO) report, in Ontario the government spent "$7.2 billion less than planned across all programs", including health. In 2019, the Ford administration capped the wages of most public sector employees, including nurses, causing staff shortages, according to health care workers' unions. Due to shortages in staffing, Intensive Care Units (ICU) reached full capacity in August 2022, forcing the UHN to announce a 'critical care bed alert' at the Toronto General Hospital affecting the Cardiovascular (CVICU), Cardiac (CICU), and Medical Surgical Intensive Care Units (MSICU). On 28 October the UHN announced that the Toronto General Hospital was again under a 'critical care bed alert' with the three intensive care units—CVICU, Cardiac CICU, and MSICU—at total bed capacity.

In August 2022, with the province of Ontario facing the peak of the seventh wave of COVID-19, the University Health Network (UHN) in Toronto, which operates the largest hospital in the city—Toronto General–said that there were so understaffed that they were calling in nursing students. They put out a call for "volunteers" to fill nursing shifts. During the sixth wave they were forced to do this several times. In August, some patients waited 33 hours in ER to get an inpatient bed in Toronto.

Canadian Federation of Nurses Unions (CFNU) said on Twitter on 31 October 2022, that it had become normalized for hospitals to operate understaffed at overcapacity, with nurses regularly working 16 hour shifts—two nurses recently worked 30 hour shifts.

By mid-October 2022, prior to the beginning of the "traditional flu season", across Canada emergency departments were "under intense pressure". Concerns were raised as in Europe an eighth COVID-19 wave was beginning.

In the province of Quebec, there were staff shortages of all health care personnel—but mainly nursing personnel—negatively affected all of the province's health-care network." Largely because of the ongoing COVID-19 pandemic, emergency departments were operating at overcapacity, which in Montreal reached up to 200%. On 14 October, there were 4,000 health-care workers on leave because of COVID.

===== Emergency departments overloaded =====
During the seventh wave of the COVID-19 pandemic, the lack of health care personnel, particularly nurses, along with the health system's backlog and a resurgence of hospitalized COVID-19 patients were some of the factors contributing to the overloading of emergency departments and lengthening of ambulance off-loading times. By 27 October there were 1,921 COVID-19 hospitalizations in Ontario and 121 more COVID-19 deaths. Prior to that, the last time the numbers were so high was on 9 February with 2,059 hospitalized with COVID-19.

=== Morocco ===
Morocco has far fewer nurses and other paramedical staff per capita than other countries of comparable national income. The number of nurses in Morocco was 29.025 in 2011, two thirds being registered nurses and one third auxiliary nurses, a ratio of 8 nurses per 10,000 population. As a result, Morocco has been classified among 57 countries suffering from a shortage of medically trained human resources.

A recent study by the European Institute of Health Sciences (Institut Européen des Sciences de la Santé) in Casablanca based on scientific modeling of future needs indicates that the situation will worsen and that to bridge the nursing gap, Morocco needs to produce between 40,000 and 80,000 new nurse graduates until the year 2025.

=== Philippines ===
The Philippines is the largest exporter of nurses in the world supplying 25% of all overseas nurses. An Organisation for Economic Co-operation and Development study reported that one of every six foreign-born nurses in the OECD countries is from the Philippines. Of all employed Filipino RNs, roughly 85% are working overseas. This is partially in response to the inability of Filipino nurses to enter their domestic workforce due to a lack of jobs and instead become heavily dependent upon international job markets for nurses. The United States has an especially prominent representation of Filipino nurses. Of the 100,000 foreign nurses working in the U.S. as of 2000, 32.6% were from the Philippines.

==== Reasons for international migration ====
The international migration of Filipino nurses takes place in response to "push and pull" factors. The push factors are rooted in the economic conditions in the Philippines in which there is an overabundance of RNs and a lack of open employment positions. The unemployment rate in the Philippines exceeds 10%. Additionally, health care budgets set up Filipino nurses for low wages and poor benefit packages. There are fewer jobs available, thereby increasing the workload and pressure on RNs. Filipinos often pursue international employment to avoid the economic instability and poor labor conditions in their native country. The government also highly encourages the exportation of RNs internationally. Filipino nurses are pulled to work abroad for the economic benefits of international positions. While a nurse in the Philippines will earn between $180 and $200 U.S. dollars per month, a nurse in the U.S. receives a salary of $4,000 per month. Nurses abroad are greatly respected in the Philippines as they are able to support an entire family at home through remittances. In 1993, Filipinos abroad sent $800 million to their families in the Philippines thereby supporting the economy. Additionally, remittances from Filipinos made up 5.2% of the Filipino GDP (gross national product) between 1990 and 2000. Further pull factors stem from the additional economic benefits of signing bonuses in the U.S. To attract more foreign nurses, U.S. hospitals increased signing bonuses from $1,000 to $7,000. Positions abroad in the health sector are also enticing for their immigration benefits. Throughout the past 50 years of nurse migration, the U.S. has made efforts to ease the visa application process to further encourage international nurses to relieve the nursing shortage. Scholars note that the better living and working conditions, higher income, and opportunities for career advancement draw nurses from the Philippines to work in the U.S.

As the relation between the U.S. and the Philippines stretches back 50 years, Filipino nursing institutions often reflect the same education standards and methods as the U.S. curriculum. Furthermore, a knowledge of English in the Philippines makes it easier for Filipino nurses (rather than nurses from other developing nations) to work in the U.S.

Since 1916, 2,000 nurses have arrived each year in the U.S. In 1999, the U.S. approved 50,000 migrant visas for these nurses. Today, on average, there are about 30,000 Filipino nurses traveling to the U.S. each year.

==== Effects of migration ====
The transnational migration of Filipino RNs has profound effects on the economy and workforce dynamics in both sending and receiving nations. The departure of nurses from the domestic workforce represents a loss of skilled personnel and the economic investment in education. In addition, the "scarce and relatively expensive-to-train resources" invested are lost when a worker chooses to work abroad. When RNs migrate internationally, the country they emigrate from loses a valuable resource and any financial or educational support that was invested in the individual.

According to many Filipinos working in hospitals, the most educated and skilled nurses are the first to go abroad. There is disagreement among scholars on the extent to which the Filipino health sector is burdened by its nursing shortage. While the numerical data are inconsistent about whether the nurse supply is in excess or a shortage, it is clear that there is a short supply of the most skilled nurses who go abroad. As a result, operating rooms are often staffed by novice nurses, and nurses with more experience work extremely long hours. As skilled nurses decline in the urban areas, nurses from rural areas migrate to hospitals in the cities for better pay. As a result, rural communities experience a drain of health resources. Stories and studies alike demonstrate that a treatable emergency in the provinces may be fatal because there are no medical professionals to help treat them. In fact, "the number of Filipinos dying without medical attention has been steadily increasing for the last decade." The lack of attention from medical professionals has increased despite advances in technology and medicine and the increasing number of trained nurses in the Philippines.

Doctors, too, have changed professions and joined the international mobility trend. Filipino doctors have begun leaving their professions to train as nurses under the title MD-RN with the hope of immigrating to the U.S. or other developed nations more easily. Since 2000, 3,500 Filipino doctors have migrated abroad as nurses. The U.S. incentives for nurse migration encourage doctors to train as nurses in the hopes of increasing their economic prospects. As a result, the Philippines have a lower average of doctors and nurses with 0.58 and 1.69 respectively for a population of 1,000. The average statistics globally in contrast are 1.23 and 2.56. Between 2002 and 2007, 1,000 Filipino hospitals closed due to a shortage of health workers. A study conducted by the former Philippine Secretary of Health, Jaime Galvez-Tan, concluded that close to 80% of government doctors have become nurses or are studying nursing. Of the 9,000 doctors-turned-nurses, 5,000 are working overseas. The extraordinary influence of this international migration has had devastating effects on the health of Filipinos. The number of deaths that were not prevented with medical attention have increased as hospitals are shut down and rural areas are deprived of any medical treatment.

Due to the high interest in international mobility, there is little permanency in the nursing positions in the Philippines. Most RNs choose to sign short-term contracts that will allow for more flexibility to work overseas. Filipino nurses feel less committed to the hospitals as they are temporary staff members. This lack of attachment and minimal responsibility worsens the health of Filipino patients.

The education system has also been hurt by the increase of nurses in the Philippines. As Filipinos are attracted to working as nurses, the number of nursing students has steadily increased. As a result, the number of nursing programs has grown quickly in a commercialized manner. In the 1970s, there were only 40 nursing schools in the Philippines; by 2005 the number had grown to 441 nursing colleges. While the education opportunities for nursing students has grown tremendously, the quality of education has declined. This can be seen by the low rate (50%) of students who pass the nursing exam since the 1990s. Furthermore, the Technical Committee on Nursing Education of the Commission on Higher Education (CHED) determined that 23% of Filipino nursing schools failed to meet the requirements set by the government.

In summary, the emigration of Filipino nurses has encouraged doctors to switch to nursing, created a shortage of skilled specialized and experienced nurses, affected the education system, and distorted health care delivery and attention to medical issues in rural areas. While remittances, return migration, and the transfer of knowledge support the Philippines, they fail to fully compensate the loss of health workers, which disrupts the Filipino health and education sectors.

Dr. Jaime-Galvez Tan, the former Philippine Secretary of Health, warns that if the U.S. passes legislation allowing for freer immigration of nurses the health service of the Philippines could collapse.

=== United Kingdom ===
In October 2015 The UK Government announced that Nurses will be added to the government's shortage occupation list on an interim basis.

In December 2015, 207 out of 232 English hospitals (90%) reported nursing shortages.

In January 2016 the RCN stated that more than 10,000 nursing posts went unfilled in 2015. This represented a 3% increase year on year from 11% in 2013, 14% in 2014 and 17% in 2015 of all London nursing positions and 10% as an average nationwide. According to a BBC article the Department of Health said it did not recognise the figures.

=== Poland ===
As of 2020 in Poland, has had very complex issues with their nursing staff. As more nurses have received higher levels of education, they are demanding more pay and better qualifications.

Poland's poor access to medical care services, their poor financial situation of most hospitals and medical facilities, the unfinished healthcare reform and increasing costs of modern medical procedures and limited accessibility are the leading causes of staffing shortages in Poland.

=== United States ===
According to the American National Council of State Boards of Nursing, the number of U.S. trained nurses has been increasing over the past decade: In 2000, 71,475 U.S.-trained nurses became newly licensed. In 2005, 99,187 U.S.-trained nurses became newly licensed. In 2009, 134,708 U.S.-trained nurses became newly licensed. Therefore, a 9.8% annual increase of newly licensed U.S. nurses has been observed each year over nine years. It is clear that nursing enrollment in the U.S. has significantly increased over the past decade relative to the 1.19% annual U.S. population growth.

While the number of U.S. trained licensed nurses has increased each year, the projected nursing demand growth rate from 2008 to 2018, as reported by the U.S. Bureau of Labor Statistics, is anticipated to be 22%, or 2.12% annually. Therefore, the 9.8% annual growth of new RN's exceeds the current new position growth rate by a net of 7.7% per year with the assumption of consistent growth figures over the next decade.

The United States population is projected to grow at least 18% over two decades in the 21st century, while the population of those 65 and older is expected to increase three times that rate. The increase in the number of elderly is projected to lead to an increased demand for nurses in senior care facilities as well as the need to fill the positions of nurses as they reach retirement age. Projections suggest that by 2020 to 2025 one third of the current RN and LPN workforce will be eligible to retire. The current shortfall of nurses is projected at 800,000 by the year 2020.

Professional health and related occupations were expected to rapidly increase between 2000 and 2012. The demand for health care practitioners and technical occupations will continue to increase. It is projected that there will be 1.7 million job openings between 2000 and 2012. The demand for registered nurses is even higher. Registered nurses are predicted to have 1,101,000 openings due to growth during this 10-year period. In a 2001 American Hospital Association survey, 715 hospitals reported that 126,000 nursing positions were unfilled.

Other research findings report a projection of opposite trend. Although the demand for nurses continues to increase, the rate of employment has slowed down since 1994 because hospitals were incorporating more less-skilled nursing personnel to substitute for nurses. With the decrease in employment, the earnings for nurses decreased. Wage among nurses leveled off in correlation with inflation between 1990 and 1994. The recent economic crisis of 2009 has further decreased the demand for RNs.

Comparing the data released by the Bureau of Health Professions, the projections of shortage within two years have increased.

Year	Supply	Demand	Shortage	Percent
2000	1,889,243	1,999,950	-110,707	-6%
2005	2,012,444	2,161,831	-149,387	-7%
2010	2,069,369	2,344,584	-275,215	-12%
2015	2,055,491	2,562,554	-507,063	-20%
2020	2,001,998	2,810,414	-808,416	-28.8%

US: Supply versus Demand Projections for FTE Registered Nurses

Source: Data from the Bureau of Health Professions (2002)

According to the U.S. Bureau of Labor Statistics, registered nurses expect about a 6% employment growth from 2022 to 2032, with about 193,100 openings on average each year. Reportedly 100,000 RNs are to leave the workforce with an addition of 188,962 RNs under 40 years old as stated by the NCSBN. Such reasons are attributed to burnout, stress, a large population of nurses retiring, the COVID-19 pandemic, etc. The continuous shortage of nurses in the workforce increase the demand of healthcare services.

However, emergency and acute care nurses are in great demand, and this temporary reduction of the shortage is not expected to last as the economy improves. In 2009, it was reported that in places like Des Moines, Iowa newly graduated nurses were having more difficulty finding jobs and older nurses were delaying retirement due to economic conditions. This hiring situation was mostly found in hospitals; nursing homes continued to hire and recruit nurses in strong numbers.

Some states have a surplus of nurses while other states face a shortage. This is due to factors such as the number of new graduates and the total demand for nurses in each area. Some states face a severe shortage (such as the northwestern states, as well as Texas and Oklahoma), while other states have a surplus of registered nurses.

Year	Supply	Demand	Shortage	Percent
2000	1,890,700	2,001,500	-110,800	-6%
2005	1,942,500	2,161,300	-218,800	-10%
2010	1,941,200	2,347,000	-405,800	-17%
2015	1,886,100	2,569,800	-683,700	-27%
2020	1,808,000	2,824,900	-1,016,900	-36%

US: Supply versus Demand Projections for FTE Registered Nurses

Source: Data from the Bureau of Health Professions. (2004).

Following the COVID-19 pandemic, between 2019 and 2023 job vacancy rates for registered nurses in hospitals rose by approximately 50%, to reach an average of 16% in 2023, with 62% of hospitals having a vacancy rate of at least 12.5%. The average vacancy rate for hospitals declined to 9.9% as of 2024.

==== Patching up the shortage ====
Nursing shortages can be consistent or intermittent depending on the number of patients needing medical attention. These patients are often keenly aware of staffing issues due to the communication issues and missed care that they experience and report, too.

Retention and recruitment are important methods to achieve a long-term solution to the nursing shortage. Recruitment is promoted through making nursing attractive as a profession, especially to younger workers, to counteract the high average age of RNs and future waves of retirement. Refining the work environment can improve the overall perception of nursing as an occupation. This can be achieved by ensuring job satisfaction. A few ways the academic nursing administrators can make a change in illustrated from the writers Lori Candela, Antonio Gutierrez, and Sarah Keating in their journal, Nurse Education Today. "Individual support to attend workshops or conferences, participation in on-campus teaching/learning faculty sessions, the use of consultants with expertise in particular areas around teaching and evaluation, and mentoring networks that include senior faculty with teaching expertise" can all create a strong relationship between staff members therefore developing a better environment. Additionally, financial opportunities such as signing bonuses can attract nurses individuals are more likely to participate in activities when there is an advantage in it for them.

To assist the health sector, Congress approved the Nurse Reinvestment Act in 2002 to provide funding to advance nursing education, scholarships, grants, diversity programs, loan repayment programs, nursing faculty programs, and comprehensive geriatric education. Currently, mandatory overtime for nurses is prohibited in nine states, hospital accountability to implement valid staffing plans in seven states, and only one state implements the minimum staffing ratio.

Aid from higher education systems assist the nursing shortage issue. Reports from CAP suggest that "Congress pass legislation that would invest in nursing faculty, clinical placements, and nursing program facilities", which would allow nursing colleges to enroll and graduate more students.

Individuals from groups such as ONA worked with OHA to test the impact that RN staffing had on patient health care. After uncovering crucial information Nurses from across the states joined these group members to find ways to be able to assign responsibility where it was needed which resulted in the impact of staffing shortages. This acts resulted in the "Nursing 2015 Initiative which built personal relationships and new-found trust".

Other ways of assisting to fill the shortage in the United States would include giving nurses the opportunity to pick their own overtime and schedules. Also, it would be a great incentive to young nurses to enter a hospital if they knew there were bonuses for continued excellence. In addition, maintaining a staff with an experienced skill mix provides opportunities for educating younger nurses and improving patient outcomes.

To respond to fluctuating needs in the short term, health care industries have used float pool nurses and travel agency nurses. Float pool nurses are staff employed by the hospital to work in any unit. Agency nurses are employed by an independent staffing organization and have the opportunity to work in any hospitals on a daily, weekly or contractual basis. Similar to other professionals, both types of nurses can only work within their licensed scope of practice, training, and certification. Travel nurses do often move between very different hospital systems, but they tend to remain within similar units (such as emergency departments or intensive care units). Float pool nurses have experience with the same systems and management.

Float pool nurses and agency nurses, as mentioned by First Consulting group, are used in response to the current shortage. Use of the said services increases the cost of health care, decreases specialty, and decreases the interest in long-term solutions to the shortage. When float pool nurses are held for longer terms within their units, it is suggested that hand-offs are completed more safely. Giving more power to nursing managers in controlling patient ratios or acceptable unit numbers can assist these changes.

Health care industries have the opportunity to reduce nursing workloads and improve patient outcomes through the addition of nursing support staff (such as nursing assistants or licensed practical nurses).

International recruitment is often used to fill the nursing gap but gives rise to concern now that the U.S. Homeland Security has stopped the issuance of the H-1C visa, which was deemed specifically for nurses. Because of the Affordable Care Act, which will result in an increased number of insured Americans, it is estimated that there will be an even greater need for nurses in the near future. U.S. trained nurses are concerned, however, that this recruitment initiative impedes on their ability to obtain positions in the field after completing their training. A nursing shortage does not translate to new nursing jobs.

A growing response to the nursing shortage is the advent of travel nursing a specialized sub-set of the staffing agency industry that has evolved to serve the needs of hospitals affected. According to the Professional Association of Nurse Travelers, there are an estimated 25,500 working in the U.S. The number of LVN/LPN nurse travelers is not known.

There is a nursing recruitment initiative and nursing workforce development program for residents of the United States originally from foreign countries, who were professional nurses in their countries but are no longer in that profession in the United States. This initiative helps them get back into the nursing profession, especially getting through credentialing and the nursing board exams. The original model was developed in 2001 at San Francisco State University in cooperation with City College of San Francisco ("The San Francisco Welcome Back Center"). There are centers in many cities, such as Los Angeles, San Diego, and Boston—where it is called a "Boston Welcome Back Center for Internationally Educated Nurses". It is a program meant for residents of the United States only. The Boston Welcome Back Center was opened in October 2005 with a $50,000 seed grant from the Board of Higher Education's Nursing Initiative.

The invention of information technology systems has significantly helped with the nursing shortage in America. IT solutions such as hospital operations dashboards and acuity-based staffing solutions. The acuity based solutions strategically manages staffing and patient impact outcomes through the use of data analytics to determine data productivity trends. Hospital operations dashboards use real time solutions, predictive analytics and engineered algorithms, this tool analyzes clinical data and transforms data into actionable items to help with management. These systems anticipate demand and then balance resources and demand in real time to ensure safe staffing. These systems are also effective in managing the float pool nurses and systemwide bonus offerings during times of low staffing and high patient intake.

It is recommended for organizations to further invest in health information technology (HIT). Nurses expressed their dissatisfaction with HIT after approximately 9 months, then their indifference towards it after 18 months. Providing access to updated and comprehensive equipment, and system-focus on patient safety is imperative to implementing HIT success.

The RAFAELA measurement system of daily workload per nurse is used in Finland to assess staffing needs throughout a hospital and fill needed gaps in patient care. Avoiding fixed staffing ratios through these patient-workload management systems ensures nurses are able to provide whole patient care.

According to a 2024 study by the University at Albany, SUNY Center for Health Workforce Studies, most of the New York hospitals participating in the study found that recruitment of RNs had improved over time, but that they struggled with retention. The study identified five main strategies that hospitals were using to improve retention: seeking Magnet or Pathway to Excellence designations; workforce development such as additional training for newly graduated nurses; reducing burnout via programs to help with reducing stress, including employee wellness programs; implementing strategies to reduce workplace violence; and using virtual nursing to help with patient monitoring.

==== Legislation ====
In 2004, California became the first state to legally mandate minimum nurse-to-patient staffing ratios in acute care hospitals. A subsequent study evaluated the effect on outcomes for nurses and patients by comparing outcomes in California in the subsequent two years with those of New Jersey and Pennsylvania — two similar states without such mandates. There was substantial compliance with the mandate in California, with over 80% compliance rates reported across several different units of surveyed hospitals; equivalent levels of non-mandated compliance in the comparator states were considerably lower, at 19%, 52%, and 63% compliance in medical/surgical, pediatric, and intensive care units (ICUs) in New Jersey and 33%, 66%, and 71% in Pennsylvania. After extensive adjustment for patient and hospital characteristics, the study revealed statistically significant relationships between the nurse-to-patient ratio and 30-day mortality and failure to rescue (FTR — that is, failure to prevent a clinically important deterioration, such as death or permanent disability, from a complication of an underlying illness or of medical care) in all three states. Across all three states, facilities with nurse-to-patient ratios consistent with those mandated in California were associated with lower rates of nursing burnout, and nurses reported consistently better quality of care.

In September 2007, in the 110th Congress, Senator Richard Durbin of Illinois introduced S.2064: Nurse Training and Retention Act of 2007 on the floor of the Senate. It was a bill to fund comprehensive programs to ensure an adequate supply of nurses. It was referred to committee for study but was never reported on by the committee.

In April 2008, in the 110th Congress, H.R. 5924: Emergency Nursing Supply Relief Act was introduced as a bill to the House of Representatives by Robert Wexler of Florida. If it had passed, it would have amended the American Competitiveness in the Twenty-first Century Act of 2000 and would have given up to 20,000 visas per year to nurses and physical therapists until September 2011. Immediate family members of visa beneficiaries would not be counted against the 20,000 yearly cap. The bill was referred to committees for study in Congress but was never reported on by the committees.

On February 11, 2009, legislation was introduced by Representatives John Shadegg (R-AZ), Jeff Flake (R-AZ), and Ed Pastor (D-AZ) in the 111th Congress to the House of Representatives, HR 1001 ("The Nursing Relief Act of 2009": To create a new non-immigrant visa category for registered nurses, and for other purposes) making a new non-immigrant "W" visa category for nurses to be able to work in the United States. This was to relieve the nursing shortage still considered to be a crisis despite the economic problems in the country. The proposed bill was referred to the Committee on the Judiciary but was never reported on by Committee.

The 2010 Patient Protection and Affordable Care Act includes more strategies for funding and retention. The act provides funding for advanced education nursing grants, diversity grants, and offers a nurse education loan repayment program. The program repays over half of the student loans if the nursing student signs a contract stating that they will work for two years at a medical facility that has a nursing shortage.

The Nurse Reinvestment Act of 2002 had many strategies. The law authorized and had provisions that included topics such as loan repayment programs and scholarships, providing more grants to the nursing students, making more public service announcements about nursing and educating the public on what a great profession it is and making nursing school more flexible by creating options for the people who already have a degree but would like to go into nursing.

In assistance to the shortage of staff when it comes to nursing, Pearce (2018) declared in the study conducted that the Federal Registered Nurse Staffing Act that has been put into Congress since 1998 came out with a current updated version called The Safe Staffing for Nurse and Patient Safety Act, which looks to "create a unique staffing plan for each unit; and consider nurse experience, patient intensity of need, staff skill mix, and other resource availability, such as availability of technology".

==== Immigration process to U.S. ====
Nurses seeking to immigrate to the U.S. can apply as direct hires or through a recruitment agency. For entry to the U.S. a foreign nurse must pass a Visa Screen which includes three parts of the process. First they must pass a creditable review, followed by a test of nursing knowledge called the Commission on Graduates of Foreign Nursing Schools examination (CGFNS), and finally a test of English-language proficiency.

Foreign nurses compete amongst themselves, with professionals, and other skilled workers for 140,000 employment-based (EB) visas every year. Filipino nurses are only allocated 2,800 visas per year, thereby creating a backlog among applicants. For example, in September 2009, 56,896 Filipinos were waiting for EB-3 visa numbers. This number contrasts with the 95,000 nurses licensed in 2009, many of whom want to migrate to the U.S. Once a nurse obtains a visa number and is approved for a visa and authorized to work in the U.S., they must pass the National Council Licensure Examination to qualify for U.S. nursing standards. (See also employment-based visa retrogression.)

== See also ==
- Artificial scarcity
- Brain drain
- Health care providers
- Health Human Resources
- Medical desert
- Physician supply
