= Travel nursing =

Nursing assignment concept in response to shortages

Travel nursing is a nursing assignment concept that developed in response to the nursing shortage in the United States in the 1970s. This business supplies nurses who travel to work in temporary nursing positions, mostly in hospitals. While travel nursing historically refers specifically to the nursing profession, it can also be used as a blanket term to refer to nursing and allied health professionals, physicians, advanced practice nurses, physician assistants, dentists and other support staff including certified nursing assistants.

Healthcare professional travel contracts exist throughout the world wherever there is a need and shortage of appropriate healthcare professionals in hospitals and facilities, disaster relief and global aid projects.

Reasons cited for pursuing travel nursing opportunities include higher pay in some cases, professional growth and development, and personal adventure. Travelers typically select from one or more recruitment agencies to act as intermediaries between the traveler and hospitals or other potential employers, but may also work as an independent contractor (IC). Agencies may submit applications for numerous positions concurrently on behalf of a traveler.

== History of travel nursing ==
Florence Nightingale is a famous name in the history of nursing. She and a few other nurses traveled to Turkey during the Crimean War to help soldiers who were wounded in battle. Some consider them to be the first travel nurses, although the term "travel nursing" did not exist at that time.

The term "travel nursing" arose in 1978 during Mardi Gras week in New Orleans, Louisiana. This week of celebration and festivities resulted in many injuries, which unexpectedly overwhelmed local hospitals. They had to contract nurses from all over the U.S. to provide extra support. At that time the first travel nurses were recruited by entrepreneur Bruce Male's private agency, Travel Nursing Corps, later called "Travcorps". Since then, travel nursing has expanded and taken a whole new meaning.

== US clinical requirements ==
In the U.S., the usual requirements for becoming a travel nurse within the private staffing industry are to have graduated from an accredited nursing program, and a minimum of 1.5 years of clinical experience with 1 year being preferred in one's specialty and licensure in the state of employment, often granted through reciprocity with the home state's board of nursing. Although most places do require at least 1 year of nursing experience, it can still be easy to get into travel nursing from the start.

Some travel agencies will reimburse travelers for the cost of the license or other required certifications. A travel nurse may receive a minimal orientation to the new hospital (and rarely no orientation at all).

If the nurse's home state has joined the Nurse Licensure Compact (NLC), the nurse can work in any other compact state as long as the home state license is in good standing, and the permanent residence is in a compact state. This facilitates the license reciprocity process and potentially speeds up the time to employment. There are currently 26 states participating in the NLC, including states such as Florida, Texas, or Arizona.

Travel nurses are required to have a nursing license with the appropriate state, but they may also need to complete other requirements, such as Basic Life Support, Advanced Cardiac Life Support, and Pediatric Advanced Life Support courses.

== Travel nursing assignments ==
Travelers typically work under a short-term contract. In the United States, these contracts typically range from 4 to 13 weeks, although 26-week assignments are also possible. If there is a continual need for travelers they will be offered extension contracts. Contracts outside of the U.S. can last 1–2 years. Frequently, a permanent position is offered by the hospital at the end of the contract. Travel nurses can also work abroad. Presently there are 500+ U.S. Travel Nurse Companies that employ Nursing and Allied Healthcare Professionals. Updated 3-24-2024 Common practice areas for travel nurses include:

- Hospitals
- Clinics
- Community health center
- Private practices
- Rehabilitation facilities
- Nursing home

== Compensation ==
=== Pay ===
Travel nurses are paid by the travel nursing agency that placed them, which in turn is paid by the hospital. The amount of money a hospital pays to the agency is referred to as the bill rate. The agency calculates and subtracts costs, overhead and profit margin from the bill rate and pays the difference to the traveler. To compensate travelers, higher rates than the rates paid to permanent staff is the norm. Pay can range from $30–50/hour or more depending on various factors. Travel nurses may work between 36 and 48 hours (about two days) per week with overtime included. Additionally, travel nurses may receive bonuses. Hospital bonuses range from U.S. $250 to U.S. $5000. Variables that affect pay include the location of the assignment (vacation destinations tend to be more competitive and therefore able to find willing applicants for less), demand for the position, local cost of living and the type of nursing specialty being sought.

Travel nurses assigned to rapid response and “crisis” situations, more specifically nurses needed to help in contexts involving natural disasters, are typically compensated more for their work.

Since all costs and compensation must come out of the bill rate, a traveler working for an agency offering a high level of benefits will probably be paid lower wages than one working for an agency that offers few or no non-wage benefits.

=== Housing ===
If travel agencies provide housing, it usually consists of a one-bedroom furnished apartment. Utilities (electric, water, trash) may be included. Telephone, cable television and sometimes internet service can be included. Housing may include a washer and dryer, dishwasher, microwave and basic housewares such as pots, dishes, utensils and linens. Some travel companies allow the travel nurse to participate in the housing search and selection process.

Nearly all agencies will offer a housing stipend if the nurse chooses to secure housing independent of the agency. Stipend amounts can be substantial (even higher than actual wages), and these may be provided tax-free if the traveler has a qualifying tax home as determined by the Internal Revenue Service (IRS). Some companies require the traveler to take the housing stipend. The housing stipend or the value of the provided housing is generally taxed as part of the pay if the traveler does not have a qualifying tax home.

Under IRS guidance, a taxpayer's tax home is usually the entire city or general area where the main place of business or work is located, regardless of where the family residence is maintained. Travel nurses are a special case because they often do not have a single, regular work location. In these circumstances, the IRS may treat the place where the nurse "regularly lives" as the tax home, and evaluates factors such as whether the nurse performs some work in that area, whether living expenses at that residence are duplicated when working away from it, and whether there has been an abandonment of that residence. When at least two of these factors are met, the location will more often be treated as a tax home; if not, the individual may be treated as an itinerant worker whose tax home is wherever they work, and who cannot exclude travel-related stipends from income.

For travel nurses with a qualifying tax home, housing stipends, meal allowances and other per diem payments connected to temporary assignments (generally expected to last one year or less) may be treated as non-taxable reimbursements rather than wages, up to applicable limits. Travel nurses who do not maintain a tax home, who take long-term or indefinite assignments, or who do not incur duplicate living expenses are more likely to have these payments treated as taxable compensation. Because state income tax rules also depend on residency and domicile, some travel nurses consult tax professionals to understand how federal tax home rules interact with state residency and domicile requirements.

=== Assignment reimbursements ===
A travel allowance is generally paid by the travel agency. Some agencies offer healthcare insurance (or reimbursement for insurance held elsewhere), the ability to contribute to 401(k)accounts (sometimes with matching funds), licensure reimbursement, referral bonuses and loyalty reward programs. Some companies are even starting to add vacation and sick days, stock investment options and continuing education reimbursements.

== Covid-19 pandemic effects ==
One of the most pivotal moments for the travel nursing industry occurred during the COVID-19 pandemic, which began in 2019. The pandemic placed immense strain on hospitals and healthcare facilities worldwide, leading to a sharp increase in demand for healthcare workers. Many hospitals saw a significant portion of their permanent staff resign due to fears of working in an environment with an unknown virus and the risks to personal health.

During the COVID pandemic, for example, travel nurses became irreplaceable as a temporary solution measure against a virus that was ravaging healthcare providers almost as often as it was affecting patients. In response, hospitals and healthcare providers began offering significantly higher pay and incentives to attract nurses willing to travel and work in high-need areas. This surge in demand greatly expanded the travel nursing sector, drawing in nurses from all over the country and highlighting the critical role travel nurses play in the healthcare system. The pandemic demonstrated how travel nursing could be a vital resource in emergency situations, reshaping the industry’s growth and future prospects

=== Cycle effect ===
The increased pay being offered to nurses traveling to different hospitals has created what TIME magazine calls a "vicious cycle". Hospitals may spend so much money on travel nurses that they are not able to increase pay for staff nurses already employed at their facility. This leads to more and more staff nurses leaving for travel contracts elsewhere.

== Organizations ==
Nurses typically go through an agency or an organization to seek work. These agencies have recruiters who are matched up with a nurse seeking a temporary position usually outside of their home state. Organizations and agencies pay a higher wage and provide housing for the workers.
