= Virtual manufacturing network =

ICT virtual networking

A Virtual Manufacturing Network (VMN), also known as Global Manufacturing Virtual Networks (GMVN), are a collaborative network where multiple manufacturing entities—ranging from original equipment manufacturers (OEMs) to component suppliers—cooperate through ICT infrastructures to function as an integrated supply network, despite not being under single ownership. VMNs enable participating firms to specialize in core competencies while outsourcing non-core tasks, thus reducing expenses.

The progression from VMNs has led to the emergence of Dynamic Manufacturing Networks (DMNs), which offer rapid reconfiguration in response to market or supply chain changes.

== Emergence ==
The idea of the GMVN was introduced in 2000. It emerged in response to the shift from traditional, vertically integrated manufacturing to collaborative networks of specialized, independent companies, particularly in the electronics industry. By the mid-1990s, original equipment manufacturers (OEMs) began outsourcing non-core manufacturing to focus on research and development, marketing, and customer solutions, while contract electronics manufacturers (CEMs), evolving into electronics manufacturing services (EMS) providers, expanded to offer comprehensive manufacturing solutions. This transformation, driven by market demands for customized solutions, globalization, and advancements in ICT, enabled dynamic collaborations. MVNs leverage a cooperative resource pool, allowing companies to construct flexible supply chains without maintaining extensive internal manufacturing assets, enhancing agility and competitiveness in industries such as electronics, automotive, and aerospace.

== Case Studies ==
=== Aeronautical Industry: Rolls-Royce ===
Rolls-Royce, a leading aircraft engine manufacturer, demonstrates the use of G in the aerospace industry. Initially, in the 1950s, Rolls-Royce relied on centralized production, manufacturing entire engines, such as the Dart, at a single UK facility with minimal external collaboration. Following its 1987 privatization, the company shifted to a decentralized, globalized network. By the 2000s, its manufacturing centers were specialized, each focusing on specific components like compressors or turbines to achieve economies of scale. This restructuring enabled flexible supply chains tailored to specific projects. For example, the Trent 900 engine for the Airbus A380 involves partnerships with companies like Volvo Aero and ITP, while the F136 engine for the F-35 Lightning II is a collaborative effort with General Electric. These partnerships allow Rolls-Royce to manage risks and enhance efficiency in response to market demands.

== See also ==
- Virtual manufacturing
- Dynamic manufacturing network
