= DMN =

DMN or dmn may refer to:

== Science ==
- Default mode network, a network of brain regions
- Dorsal motor nucleus, a nerve nucleus for the vagus nerve
- Dorsomedial nucleus, a nerve nucleus for the hypothalamus in the brain
- Dimethylnitrosamine, a chemical

== Other uses ==
- DMN (group), a Brazilian rap group
- The Dallas Morning News
- Darjah Utama Seri Mahkota Negara (D.M.N.), Malaysian Federal Award (second order of precedence)
- Decision Model and Notation, an Object Management Group standard
- Dunman Secondary School, a secondary school in Tampines, Singapore
- Dynamic Manufacturing Network, a virtual alliance of enterprises who collectively constitute a dispersed manufacturing network
- D.Mn., an abbreviation used for the United States District Court for the District of Minnesota
- dmn, the ISO 630 code for the Mande languages
- Dhamangaon railway station (station code: DMN), Maharashtra, India
