= Virtual organization =

A virtual organization is a temporary collection of geographically dispersed individuals, groups, organizational units, or entire organizations that depend on electronic linking in order to complete the production process. Businesses come together to share skills or core competencies and resources in order to better respond to business opportunities, and whose cooperation is supported by computer networks. It is a manifestation of distributed collaborative networks. A virtual enterprise is a particular case of virtual organization. Virtual organizations do not represent a firm’s attribute but can be considered as a different organizational form and carries out the objectives of cyber diplomacy.

== Definition ==
The term "virtual organization", which emerged in reference to the phrase "virtual reality" lacks a widely-accepted fixed definition. The term virtual organization implies the novel and innovative relationships between organizations and individuals. Technology and globalization both support this particular type of organization.

Virtual can be defined as "not physically existing as such but made by software to appear to do so", in other words "unreal but looking real". This definition precisely outlines the leading principle of this unconventional organization, which holds the form of a real (conventional) corporation from the outside but does not actually exist physically and implicates an entirely digital process relying on independents web associates. Thus, virtual organizations are centred on technology and position physical presence in the background. Virtual organizations possess limited physical resources as value is added through (mobile) knowledge rather than (immovable) equipment.

Virtual organizations necessitate associations, federations, relations, agreements and alliance relationships as they essentially are partnership webs of disseminated organizational entities or self-governing corporations.

In the USA groups of people can assemble online and enter into an agreement to work together toward a for-profit goal, with or without having to formally incorporate or form a traditional company. A virtual corporation (S corporation or LLC) may be required to maintain a registered agent with a physical address but it can be started, operated and terminated without any of the principals ever being in each other's physical presence. Global Healthcare Marketing and Communications, LLC (Global HMC) is an example of a virtual corporation operating worldwide sans bricks or mortar. The company provides medical education services to major pharmaceutical companies and the business model differs significantly from traditional medical education agencies with a physical presence.

== Apparition and evolution ==
The emergence of outsourcing in the 80s unquestionably played a significant role as its aim is to eradicate unproductive internal services and transfers the difficulty outside of the organization. Outsourcing necessarily implies partnerships as companies resort to other establishments. Thus, this method highlighted the necessity of alliances and networking in a business and provoked a great interest for new disciplines. Indeed, this process has dramatically changed the way organizations consider partners and has raised their awareness concerning the benefits smart alliances can offer. Though, until the early 1980s, this extremely bureaucratic organization arrangement (involving challenging, complex and slower decision-making) was considered adequate to manage a vast number of employees.

The term was first utilized in the early 1990s as demonstrate the work of Jan Hopland, Roger N. Nagel, William H. Davidow and Malone. The table below allows us to understand more specifically their faintly distinctive theories:

Virtual organizations' views
| | Jan Hopland | Roger N. Nagel | William H. Davidow and Malone |
| Position | Digital Equipment Corp. executive | Management expert | Authors of The Virtual Corporation |
| Virtual organization’s depiction | A company that knows how to utilise partnerships both inside and outside its boundaries in order to mobilise more assets than it presently has on its own | Take advantage of market openings thanks to technology which allow enterprises to form temporary partnerships | A broad and catch-all term comprising numerous management ideas and trendy terms |

As mentioned before, there is not yet a universal definition of the term virtual organization. Even though this concept started to evolve a long time ago it is still progressing nowadays. We can observe below the innovative virtual organization's model focusing on quickly and efficiently creating first-class products (using each partner core competence).

== Projects ==
Virtual organisations have become increasingly common in the area of research and development, with often far-flung organizations forming alliances that amount to a "Virtual Research Laboratory." Vassiliou (2007) outlined a broad continuum of possible virtual laboratory relationships, ranging from relatively simple outsourcing by a central organization to tightly knit consortia of collaborating entities.

Several European Union projects in the Framework Programmes for Research and Technological Development focused on virtual enterprises:

- Business Integrator Dynamic Support Agents for Virtual Enterprise (BIDSAVER) from January 2000 through June 2002
- Working group on Advanced Legal Issues in Virtual Enterprise (ALIVE) from January 2000 through December 2002
- Legal issues for the advancement of information society technologies (LEGAL-IST) from April 2004 through March 2007
- European collaborative networked organizations leadership initiative (ECOLEAD) from April 2004 through March 2008
- Secure Process-oriented Integrative Service Infrastructure for Networked Enterprises (SPIKE) from January 2008 through December 2010
- Glocal enterprise network focusing on customer-centric collaboration (GloNet) from September 2011 through August 2014
- Business Innovation and Virtual Enterprise Environment (BIVEE) from September 2011 through August 2014
- Some virtual businesses operate solely in a virtual world. Environments such as Second Life have enough economical activity to be viable for commerce and one can make a living from sales of virtual property, products and services to virtual customers in these virtual worlds.

Another example of virtual organisation is found in the United States Army Research Laboratory's Federated Laboratories, or "Fedlabs." These began in 1996, and represented close partnerships between ARL and several industrial and academic organizations, as well as various non-profit entities. The first three FedLabs were in Advanced Displays, Advanced Sensors, and Telecommunications. Each FedLab was a large consortium, with both an overall industrial leader and an ARL leader. The cooperative agreements forming the FedLabs were somewhat unusual in that the ARL was not a mere funder of research, but an active consortium participant.

An overview of related projects (up to 2005) can be found in a book by Camarinha-Matos et al. (2005).

== Communities ==
Since 1999 the International Federation for Information Processing (IFIP) and Society of Collaborative Networks (SOCOLNET) sponsored an annual conference called the Working Conference on Virtual Enterprises (PRO-VE).

Over the last couple of decades, we have seen a major shift from an industrial economy to that of an information economy. This led to new technology to help capitalise on the information economy. Virtual enterprises allow businesses to specialize and be flexible within their environments. This business model had been applied to outsourcing and supply chains, as well as temporary consortia. Because the formation of virtual enterprises is an intricate process, a new form of technological support has been developed. The most ambitious of the support systems actually intends to automate part of the creation process, as well as the operation of these enterprises. A comprehensive overview of the state of the art, methods and tools can be found in Camarinha-Matos et al. (2008).

As with all types of enterprises, virtual enterprises present both benefits and challenges. Benefits include more economical connections with suppliers, greater opportunities to create revenue, more efficient operations, and a reduction in administrative costs. Challenges facing virtual enterprises are: inexperienced users, security, expense control, and the level of incorporation required to create a successful virtual organisation.

Examples of virtual enterprises on the Internet included Virtual Music Enterprises (from about 2004 through 2010) and Virtual Enterprise California which is part of the Virtual Enterprises, International educational group.

== Life cycle ==
Because a virtual organisation is considered a collaborative networked organization (CNO), its organizational life cycle is different in terms of time spend on creation (entrepreneurial stage) and dissolution (decline). The CNO life cycle includes the stages:

- Creation (initiation and foundation): During the initiation a strategic plan is made for the operational stage and the foundation of the CNO is executed by the constitution and actual start up.
- Operation: Execution of operations within the defined scope of the strategic plan.
- Evolution: The context of virtual organizations is rapidly changing and therefore in continuous evolution of its operation within the current strategic plan this means minor alterations.
- Metamorphosis or Dissolution: Because CNOs have gained significant experience during their relatively short lives (compared to brick-and-mortar organizations) they keep the knowledge by metamorphosing into a new organization (changing its form) with a new purpose.

== Technology required ==
Virtual organizations are supported by primary technologies such as the Internet and the World Wide Web, EDI, telecommunications, e-mails, groupware, and video conferencing.

Knowledge management technologies assisting virtual organizations comprise:

- Collaborative technologies
- Extensible markup language (XML)
- Intranets and extranets
- Personal devices
- Wireless technologies
- Virtual reality (VR)
- Portals

EDI can constitute a useful tool for virtual organizations as it transfers information (in the adequate form which a computer can utilize straightforwardly) from a computer to another and does not necessitate the intervention of any individual. EDI could be a benefit to virtual organizations in numerous ways as the exchange of information between associates is facilitated and more efficient than with non-electronic transfer: better inventory management and shipping performance, amount of time saved and faults escaped by the fact that data requisite to be entered only once, as well as a rise of the speed and accuracy of processes. However, using EDI is not the optimal choice to make for assisting communication within a virtual organization, as the flexibility required for quick reactions is lacking in this system.

Virtual organizations can be supported by groupware systems as it delivers a shared core of information to partners and a platform to collaborate regardless of the associates’ physical position. This way, groupware systems can assist associates track the rate of progress in work being done in a way that they can cooperate on the project without being concerned about geographical barriers. However, in a similar way as EDI, groupware is not the ideal decision to make for assisting communication within a virtual organization as it would not empower the organization to rapidly form an alliance to respond to a market opportunity, even though it offers more flexibility than EDI.

Many virtual firms have chosen the internet-based WWW in order to support organizational communication, as it constitutes a practical alternative to the EDI and groupware’s inflexibility. Even though helping virtual organizations’ associates to communicate was not the initial purpose of the WWW, it is still favourably relevant to this category of organizations. The web permits all co-workers (even the isolated ones) to share their thoughts, opinions and every part of any mutual mission as it was shaped to be a sort of data gathering of individuals’ knowledge.

== Benefits ==
=== To the organization ===
- Competitive advantage
- As a way of to conduct supply chain integration or bridge the merger and acquisition processes between two companies.[online]
- A pool of abilities and knowledge
- Flexibility, dynamism and better responsiveness : virtual organizations, also called "boundaryless organization", do not imply time or geographical obstacles
- Less investments costs initially
- Productivity: the implementation of virtual organization implies a 30 to 50% rise of productivity
- Less costs, more profits: virtual organization are saving a huge amount of money as they are no real-estate investments necessary, the labor cost is inferior and the number of errors is poorer

=== To the employees ===
- More independence: individuals can work when they need to and decide in which ways
- Amount of stress reduced: no workplace pressure and consequently an improved personal and family life
- Less money spent: diminution of gas consumption or money spent on public transports

=== To the society ===
- An environmental benefit: less pollution
- Expansion of the workplace area: possibility to work efficiently in the rural areas

== Issues and challenges encountered ==
Despite the advantages provided, it can be quite challenging to those familiar to conventional work group to lead as a virtual organization. Thus, large risks are conveyed with the challenge of working virtually as this new organizational structure implies several issues. Some people wrongly think that the challenges only come from the technology management but we should not forget the importance of humans. Clearly information technology offers an efficient and largely beneficial platform but we should not neglect the necessity, especially in a virtual organization, of the individuals’ skills and manner to collaborate.

Communication is a crucial factor in a virtual organization as it is responsible of its efficiency and even to its survival. Virtual organizations imply various autonomous and international workers, which also involve challenges such as different time zones and language barriers. The collaboration between associates might also get quite complicated as this type of organization denotes only a slight amount of human communication. Thus, a lack of multiple communication approaches can be observed in virtual organizations.

Culture constitutes an essential element in any organization of any type. Yet, virtual organizations have to be even more vigilant about this notion as they imply a shared leadership between the team, which is composed of self-reliant workers from all around the world. Virtual organizations must find a way to overcome cultural differences, which involve dissimilar approaches of working (such as time and deadlines) and living (punctuality for instance), in other words, distinctive philosophies. Thus, virtual organization must exegete respect for differences among the team.

Managing virtually successfully requires a valuable communication and cooperation among the team. Perceptions between partners might be quite dissimilar and could lead to conflicts concerning the management of the virtual organization. Thus, it is more than necessary that associates build a solid relationship despite the distance obstacle Trust is also a crucial matter as a shared leadership among co-workers consequently implies the loss of control on certain functions entrusted to other associates.

Virtual organizations are completely dependent to technology as they are entirely internet-based. It is more than necessary for the individuals involved in a partnership to possess similar technological tools from its associates. Compatibility matters resulting from the hardware and software such as the operating system as well as certain computer’s software might disturb the efficiency of the virtual organization. For instance, the occurrence of incompatibility issues (difficulty in integrating information generated with dissimilar tools) concerning the hardware or software, would dramatically affect virtual organizations’ process and performance as they depend on these tools. Institute, uphold and spread a definite common knowledge between partners is one of the ultimate issue to virtual organizations’ management. Security and data protection also constitute a significant challenge as all the information regarding virtual organizations are transmitted and gathered digitally. A continuous control and evaluation of the technology utilized should be done by virtual organizations in order to prevent being outdated and losing opportunities.

Virtual organization involves considerable costs. Between the setup and equipment costs and the maintenance costs, the bill can become quite steep quickly. It also constitutes a challenge to measure, evaluate and track the work done within the different departments of the virtual infrastructure. This might lead to partners missing deadlines, the necessity to rework and, thus, a loss of efficiency and profit.

== Examples of virtual organizations ==
=== Private sector ===
- Hollywood
- British Telecom
- Reuters Holdings
- Aventis
- Center for Culture & Global Studies

=== Public sector ===
- United States Department of Agriculture (USDA) National Plant Data Center
- United States Department of Energy (The Office of Science Integrated Support Center)
- Emics and OphSmart

== See also ==
- Distributed development – Research and development done across many locations
- Virtual community of practice
- Virtual management – Supervision, leadership and maintenance of virtual teams
- Virtual office – Workspace service
- Virtual team – Team whose members collaborate remotely
- Virtual volunteering – Online volunteering
