= Virtual management =

Supervision, leadership and maintenance of virtual teams

Virtual management is the supervision, leadership, and maintenance of virtual teams—dispersed work groups that rarely meet face to face. As the number of virtual teams has grown, facilitated by the Internet, globalization, outsourcing, and remote work, the need to manage them has also grown. The challenging task of managing these teams have been made much easier by availability of online collaboration tools, adaptive project management software, efficient time tracking programs and other related systems and tools. This article provides information concerning some of the important management factors involved with virtual teams, and the life cycle of managing a virtual team.

Due to developments in information technology within the workplace, along with a need to compete globally and address competitive demands, organizations have embraced virtual management structures. As in face-to-face teams, management of virtual teams is also a crucial component in the effectiveness of the team. However, when compared to leaders of face-to-face teams, virtual team leaders face the following difficulties: (a) logistical problems, including coordination of work across different time zones and physical distances; (b) interpersonal issues, including an ability to establish effective working relationships in the absence of frequent face-to-face communication; and (c) technological difficulties, including finding and learning to use appropriate technology. In global virtual teams, there is an additional dimension of cultural differences which impact on a virtual team's functioning.

== Management factors ==
For the team to reap the benefits mentioned above, the manager considers the following factors.

=== Trust and leader effectiveness ===
A virtual team leader must ensure a feeling of trust among all team members—something all team members have an influence on and must be aware of. However, the team leader is responsible for this in the first place. Team leaders must ensure a sense of psychological safety within a team by allowing all members to speak honestly and directly, but respectfully, to each other.

For a team to succeed, the manager must schedule meetings to ensure participation. This carries over to the realm of virtual teams, but in this case these meetings are also virtual. Due to the difficulties of communicating in a virtual team, it is imperative that team members attend meetings. The first team meeting is crucial and establishes lasting precedents for the team. Furthermore, there are numerous features of a virtual team environment that may impact on the development of follower trust. The team members have to trust that the leader is allocating work fairly and evaluating team members equally.

An extensive study conducted over 8 years examined what factors increase leader effectiveness in virtual teams. One such factor is that virtual team leaders need to spend more time than conventional team counterparts being explicit about expectations. This is due to the patterns of behavior and dynamics of interaction which are unfamiliar. Moreover, even in information rich virtual teams using video conferencing, it is hard to replicate the rapid exchange of information and cues available in face-to-face discussions. To develop role clarity within virtual teams, leaders should focus on developing: (a) clear objectives and goals for tasks; (b) comprehensive milestones for deliverables; and (c) communication channels for seeking feedback on unclear role guidance.

When determining an effective way of leadership for a culturally diverse team there are various ways: directive (from directive to participatory), transactional (rewarding) or transformational influence. Leadership must ensure effective communication and understanding, clear and shared plans and task assignments and collective sense of belonging in team. Further, the role of a team leader is to coordinate tasks and activities, motivate team members, facilitate collaboration and solve conflicts when needed. This proofs that a team leader's role in effective virtual team management and creating knowledge sharing environment is crucial.

=== Presence and instruction ===
Virtual team leaders must become virtually present so they can closely monitor team members and note changes that might affect their ability to undertake their tasks. Due to the distributed nature of virtual teams, team members have less awareness of the wider situation of the team or dynamics of the overall team environment. Consequently, as situations change in a virtual team environment, such as adjustments to task requirements, modification of milestones, or changes to the goals of the team, it is important that leaders monitor followers to ensure they are aware of these changes and make amendments as required. The leaders of virtual teams do not possess the same powers of physical observation, and have to be creative in setting up structures and processes so that variations from expectations can be observed well virtually (for instance, virtual team leaders have to sense when "electronic" silence means acquiescence rather than inattention). At the same time, leaders of virtual teams cannot assume that members are prepared for virtual meetings and also have to ensure that the unique knowledge of each distributed person on the virtual team is fully utilized. Virtual team leaders should be aware that information overload may result in situations when a leader has provided too much information to a team member.

=== Virtuality ===
Finally, when examining virtual teams, it is crucial to consider that they differ in terms of their virtuality. Virtuality refers to a continuum of how "virtual" a team is. There are three predominant factors that contribute to virtuality, namely: (a) the richness of communication media; (b) distance between team members, both in time zones and geographical dispersion; and (c) organizational and cultural diversity.

=== Detriments ===
In the field of managing virtual research and development (R&D) teams there have arisen certain detriments to the management decisions made when leading a team. The first of these detriments is the lack of potential for radical innovation, this is brought about by the lack of affinity with certain technologies or processes. This causes a decrease in certainty about the feasibility of the execution. As a result, virtual R&D teams focus on incremental innovations. The second detriment is the nature of the project may need to change. Depending on how interdependent each step is, the ability for a virtual team to successfully complete the project varies at each step. Thirdly, the sharing of knowledge, which was identified above as an important ingredient in managing a virtual team, becomes even more important albeit difficult. There is some knowledge and information that is simple and easy to explain and share, but there is other knowledge that may be more content or domain specific that is not so easy to explain. In a face to face group this can be done by walking a team member through the topic slowly during a lunch break, but in a virtual team this is no longer possible and the information is at risk of being misunderstood leading to set backs in the project. Finally, the distribution and bundling of resources is also very much altered by the move from collocation to virtual space. Where once the team was all in one place and the resources could be split there as needed, now the team can be anywhere, and the same resources still need to get to the correct people. This takes time, effort, and coordination to avoid potential setbacks or conflicts.

== Life cycle ==
To effectively use the management factors described above, it is important to know when in the life cycle of a virtual team they would be most useful. According to the life cycle of virtual team management includes five stages:

1. Preparations
2. Launch
3. Performance management
4. Team development
5. Disbanding

=== Preparations ===
The initial task during the implementation of a team is the definition of the general purpose of the team together with the determination of the level of virtuality that might be appropriate to achieve these goals. These decisions are usually determined by strategic factors such as mergers, increase of the market span, cost reductions, flexibility and reactivity to the market, etc. Management-related activities that should take place during preparation phase includes mission statement, personnel selection, task design, rewards system design, choose appropriate technology and organizational integration.

In regards to personnel selection, virtual teams have an advantage. To maximize outcomes, management wants the best team it can have. Before virtual teams, they did this by gathering the "best available" workers and forming a team. These teams did not contain the best workers of the field, because they were busy with their own projects, or were too far away to meet the group. With virtual teams, managers can select personnel from anywhere in the world, and so from a wider pool.

=== Launch ===
It is highly recommended that, in the beginning of virtual teamwork, all members should meet each other face to face. Crucial elements of such a "kick-off" workshop are getting acquainted with the other team members, clarifying the team goals, clarifying the roles and functions of the team members, information and training how communication technologies can be used efficiently, and developing general rules for the teamwork. As a consequence, "kick-off" workshops are expected to promote clarification of team processes, trust building, building of a shared interpretive context, and high identification with the team.

Getting acquainted, goal clarification and development of intra-team rules should also be accomplished during this phase. Initial field data that compare virtual teams with and without such "kick-off" meetings confirm a general positive effects on team effectiveness, although more differentiated research is necessary. Experimental studies demonstrate that getting acquainted before the start of computer-mediated work facilitates cooperation and trust.

One of the manager's roles during launch is to create activities or events that allow for team building. These kickoff events should serve three major goals: everyone on the team is well versed in the technology involved, everyone knows what is expected of them and when it is expected, and finally have everyone get to know one another. By meeting all three goals the virtual team may be far more successful, and it lightens everyone's load.

=== Performance management ===
After the launch of a virtual team, work effectiveness and a constructive team climate has to be maintained using performance management strategies. These comprehensive management strategies arise from the agreed upon difficulty of working in virtual teams. Research shows that constructs and expectations of team membership, leadership, goal setting, social loafing and conflict differ in cultural groups and therefore affects team performance a lot. In early team formation process, one thing to agree on within a team is the meaning of leadership and role differentiation for the team leader and other team members. To apply this, the leader must show active leadership to create a shared conceptualization of team meaning, its focus and function.

The following discussion is again restricted to issues on which empirical results are already available. These issues are leadership, communication within virtual teams, team members' motivation, and knowledge management.

Leadership is a central challenge in virtual teams. Particularly, all kinds of direct control are difficult when team managers are not at the same location as the team members. As a consequence, delegative management principles are considered that shift parts of classic managerial functions to the team members. However, team members only accept and fulfill such managerial functions when they are motivated and identify with the team and its goals, which is again more difficult to achieve in virtual teams. Next, empirical results on three leadership approaches are summarized that differ in the degree of autonomy of the team members: Electronic monitoring as an attempt to realize directive leadership over distance, management by objectives (MBO) as an example for delegative leadership principles, and self-managing teams as an example for rather autonomous teamwork.

One way to maintain control over a virtual team is through motivators and incentives. Both are common techniques implemented by managers for collocated teams, but with slight adjustments they can be used effectively for virtual teams as well. A commonly held belief is that working online, is not particularly important or impactful. This belief can be changed by notifying employees that their work is being sent to the managers. This attaches the importance of career prospects to the work, and makes it more meaningful for the workers.

Communication processes are perhaps the most frequently investigated variables relevant for the regulation of virtual teamwork. By definition, communication in virtual teams is predominantly based on electronic media such as e-mail, telephone, video-conference, etc. The main concern here is that electronic media reduce the richness of information exchange compared to face-to-face communication. This difference in richness of information is an idea shared by multiple researchers, and there are some methods to move around the drop created by working in a virtual environment. One such method is to use the anonymity provided by working digitally. It lets people share concerns without worrying about being identified. This serves to over come the lack of richness by providing a safe method to honestly provide feedback and information. Predominant research issues have been conflict escalation and disinhibited communication ("flaming"), the fit between communication media and communication contents, and the role of non-job-related communication. These research issues revolve around the idea that people become more hostile over a virtual medium making the working environment unhealthy. These findings were quickly dismissed in the presence of virtual teams due to the fact that virtual teams have the expectation that one will work longer together, and the level of anonymity is different from just a one off online interaction. One of the important needs for successful communication is the ability to have every member of the group together repeatedly over time. Effective dispersed groups show spikes in presence during communication over time, while ineffective groups do not have as dramatic spikes.

For the management of motivational and emotional processes, three groups of such processes have been addressed in empirical investigations so far: motivation and trust, team identification and cohesion, and satisfaction of the team members. Since most of the variables are originated within the person, they can vary considerably among the members of a team, requiring appropriate aggregation procedures for multilevel analyses (e.g. motivation may be mediated by interpersonal trust.).

Systematic research is needed on the management of knowledge and the development of shared understanding within the teams, particularly since theoretical analyses sometimes lead to conflicting expectations. The development of such "common ground" might be particularly difficult in virtual teams because sharing of information and the development of a "transactive memory" (i.e., who knows what in the team) is harder due to the reduced amount of face-to-face communication and the reduced information about individual work contexts.

=== Team development ===
Virtual teams can be supported by personnel and team development interventions. The development of such training concepts should be based on an empirical assessment of the needs and/or deficits of the team and its members, and the effectiveness of the trainings should be evaluated empirically. The steps of team developments include assessment of needs/deficits, individual and team training, and evaluation of training effects.

One such development intervention is to have the virtual team self-facilitate. Normally, a team brings in an outside facilitator to ensure that the team is correctly using the technology. This is a costly method of developing the team, but virtual teams can self-facilitate. This lessens the need for an outside facilitator, and saves the team time, effort, and resources.

=== Disbanding and reintegration ===
Finally, the disbanding of virtual teams and the re-integration of the team members is an important issue that has been neglected not only in empirical but also in most of the conceptual work on virtual teams. However, particularly when virtual project teams have only a short life-time and reform again quickly, careful and constructive disbanding is mandatory to maintain high motivation and satisfaction among the employees. Members of transient project teams anticipate the end of the teamwork in the foreseeable future, which in turn overshadows the interaction and shared outcomes. The final stage of group development should be a gradual emotional disengagement that includes both sadness about separation and (at least in successful groups) joy and pride in the achievements of the team.

=== Pandemic factor ===
Post pandemic the virtual team concept has been further popularized although even before the COVID-19 pandemic, many organizations were actively shifting toward remote work. As per market sources, around 80% of global corporate remote work policies had shifted to virtual and mixed forms of team collaboration during the pandemic. With the onslaught of worldwide lockdowns and challenging time management, remote work has become a necessity for the majority and virtual management has become a way of life for business owners/leaders.

== See also ==
- Distributed development
- Fractional executive
- Gig economy
- Interim Management
- Outline of management
- Virtual business
- Virtual community of practice
- Virtual team
- Virtual volunteering
