= Dynamic manufacturing network =

Type of enterprise coalition

A dynamic manufacturing network (DMN) is a coalition, either permanent or temporal, comprising production systems of geographically dispersed small and medium enterprises and/or original equipment manufacturers that collaborate in a shared value-chain to conduct joint manufacturing.

The dynamic manufacturing networks are an approach that helps to manage risks and increase benefits in the manufacturing sector. The DMNs are a proposed solution to increase the efficiency and reduce the time needed to design and operate a new manufacturing network, or to reconfigure an existing one.

== Applications ==
Manufacturing networks have become increasingly common in applied research on manufacturing, since several manufacturing enterprises have shown interest in creating such networks and taking advantage of them both for collaborative product development and for supply chain optimization.

During the last decade, the effort is mainly focused on the dynamic management of the manufacturing networks, as proven by several studies published by Accenture, MIT and the University of St. Gallen.

== See also ==
- Virtual manufacturing network
- Virtual manufacturing
