= Collaborative network =

A collaborative network is a network consisting of a variety of entities (e.g. organizations and people) that are largely autonomous, geographically distributed, and heterogeneous in terms of their operating environment, culture, social capital and goals, but that collaborate to better achieve common or compatible goals, and whose interactions are supported by computer networks. The discipline of collaborative networks focuses on the structure, behavior, and evolving dynamics of networks of autonomous entities that collaborate to better achieve common or compatible goals.

There are several manifestations of collaborative networks, such as Virtual enterprise (VE), Virtual Organization (VO), Extended Enterprise, Virtual manufacturing network, Decentralized Autonomous Organization (DAO).

== Applications ==
=== Elements ===
The seven essential elements of collaborative networks:

- Search: Allowing users to search for experts, data or content
- Employee Driven: Approved users can add and share content in wiki fashion with low barriers to authorship
- Data integration: Must allow enterprise data to be integrated into the system
- Dashboards and Monitoring: Measure success, adoption, projects through dashboards and monitoring tools
- User Follow: Ability to follow users and their content in the collaborative network
- Content integration: Connects and links content dynamically
- Governance: Controlled access to content and data

== Reference models ==
A reference model for collaborative networks is a fundamental instrument for the smooth development of the area. An example of reference model is ARCON (A Reference model for COllaborative Networks). An annual conference focused on Collaborative Networks is the Working Conference on Virtual Enterprises ('PRO-VE'). sponsored by the International Federation for Information Processing (IFIP) and Society of Collaborative Networks (SOCOLNET).

== Challenges ==
If collaborative networks evolve and become increasingly popular with corporations and their extended networks, governance and security issues will need to be addressed. Of particular relevance is the study of behavioral aspects and reference models for collaborative networks.

== See also ==
- Innovation – Practical implementation of improvements
- Knowledge engineering – Methods for developing expert systems
- Knowledge management – Processing of knowledge to accomplish organizational goals
- Semantic web – Extension of the Web to facilitate data exchange
- Collective intelligence – Group intelligence that emerges from collective efforts
- Polytely – Problem-solving technique
- Global Information Grid – Communications project of the United States Department of Defense
- Open Innovation – Term for external cooperation in innovation
