= Change-of-shift report =

In healthcare, a change-of-shift report is a meeting between healthcare providers at the change of shift in which vital information about and responsibility for the patient is provided from the off-going provider to the on-coming provider (Groves, Manges, Scott-Cawiezell, 2016). Other names for change-of-shift report include handoff, shift report, handover, or sign-out. Change-of-shift report is key to inpatient care because healthcare providers (nurses, physicians, nursing assistants etc.) are essential to providing around the clock care.

== Nursing change-of-shift report ==
During report, the outgoing nurses discuss with the oncoming nurses the condition of each patient and any changes that have occurred to the patient during the shift. The purpose is not to cover all details recorded in the patient's medical record, but to summarize individual patient progress. The content of the report often depends on the local organization.

== Issues with report ==
While report is necessary in order to communicate important information between nurses, various problems are posed by the giving of report.

- Nurses in many places are legally not permitted to leave the facility until the provider has given report to the next shift. "Walking off the job" may be considered abandonment, which may be grounds for revocation of the nurse's license. At the same time, facilities are not legally required in all places to pay nurses for the extra time beyond their shift they are forced to stay over to complete report. It is not uncommon for nurses to attend report in their own time before and after a shift.
- While privacy laws require report to be given in a location where unauthorized people cannot hear the report (patients and authorized visitors for that patient are allowed to hear their report, but patients and visitors are not allowed to hear reports for other patients), some facilities prohibit family members from visiting patients during report times. In contrast, some facilities require shift reports to take place in front of each affected patient, including authorized visitors.
- A major challenge in the shift reports is communication issues between outgoing and incoming nurses, which are the leading cause of reduced service safety and patient dissatisfaction. The review identified several key challenges, including poor coordination, time management, non-use of checklists, and inadequate management. These communication breakdowns can lead to errors in patient care, incomplete information transfer, and failure to follow up on necessary treatments, all of which can increase the risk of patient harm.

== Nursing bedside shift report and patient safety ==
There is evidence to suggest that performing change of shift report at the bedside is key to patient safety. In 2001, the Institute of Medicine stated that "it is in inadequate handoff that safety often fails first." This is because at every change of shift, there is a chance for miscommunication about vital patient information. A specific type of change-of-shift report is Nursing Bedside Shift Report in which the off going nurse provides change-of-shift report to the on coming nurse at the patient's bedside. Since 2013, giving report at the patient bedside has been recommend by the Agency for Healthcare Research and Quality (AHRQ) to improve patient safety. However, it wasn't until recently that it was known how Nursing Bedside Shift Report works to keep patients safe. A qualitative study by the nurse researchers Groves, Manges, and Scott-Cawiezell developed a grounded theory on how bedside nurses can use nursing bedside shift report (NBSR) to keep patients safe. According to Groves et al. (2016) NBSR is used by nurses to keep patients safe by "reducing risk of harm through conveying the patient story from shift to shift." Additionally, NBSR is key to reducing risk of harm because it supports the nurses ability to identify and address risks. Preliminary results from a simulation study found that the way nursing report is structured, can affect nurses' safety oriented behaviors (like checking for pressure ulcers, double checking medications, decreasing room clutter to prevent falls).

== See also ==
- Follow-the-sun, a reporting style in the software development business where work is handed off to the next shift

== Sources ==
- Foundations of Caregiving, published by the American Red Cross
- Lamond, D (2000). "The information content of the nurse change of shift report: a comparative study". J Adv Nurs. 31 (4): 794–804. doi:10.1046/j.1365-2648.2000.01349.x. PMID 10759975.
- Groves, P. S., Manges, K. A., & Scott-Cawiezell, J. (2016). Handing Off Safety at the Bedside. Clinical nursing research, 1054773816630535.
