= Virtual team =

Team whose members collaborate remotely

A virtual team (also known as a geographically dispersed team, distributed team, or remote team) usually refers to a group of individuals who work together from different geographic locations and rely on communication technology such as email, instant messaging, and video or voice conferencing services in order to collaborate. The term can also refer to groups or teams that work together asynchronously or across organizational levels. Powell, Piccoli and Ives (2004) define virtual teams as "groups of geographically, organizationally and/or time dispersed workers brought together by information and telecommunication technologies to accomplish one or more organizational tasks." As documented by Gibson (2020), virtual teams grew in importance and number during 2000-2020, particularly in light of the 2020 COVID-19 pandemic which forced many workers to collaborate remotely with each other as they worked from home.

As the proliferation of fiber optic technology has significantly increased the scope of off-site communication, there has been a tremendous increase in both the use of virtual teams and scholarly attention devoted to understanding how to make virtual teams more effective (see Stanko & Gibson, 2009; Hertel, Geister & Konradt, 2005; and Martins, Gilson & Maaynard, 2004 for reviews). When utilized successfully, virtual teams allow companies to procure the best expertise without geographical restrictions, to integrate information, knowledge, and resources from a broad variety of contexts within the same team, and to acquire and apply knowledge to critical tasks in global firms. According to Hambley, O'Neil, & Kline (2007), "virtual teams require new ways of working across boundaries through systems, processes, technology, and people, which requires effective leadership." Such work often involves learning processes such as integrating and sharing different location-specific knowledge and practices, which must work in concert for the multi-unit firm to be aligned. Yet, teams with a high degree of "virtuality" are not without their challenges, and when managed poorly, they often underperform face-to-face (FTF) teams.

In light of the 2020 COVID-19 pandemic, many industries experienced a rapid and overnight transition to virtual work as a result of "social distancing." However, some scholars have argued the phrase "social distancing" in reference to the practice of physical distancing between colleagues may have dangerous connotations, potentially increasing prejudice based on age or ethnicity, isolation due to limited options for interpersonal contact, and hopelessness, given the focus on prohibitions rather than solutions. Today, most work teams have become virtual to some degree, though the literature has yet to incorporate the dynamic urgency of the pandemic and the impacts of rapid-fire learning of new technology and communication skills.

== Origins ==
The acceleration of digital technologies has allowed common, even synchronous activities to be distributed across employees at remote locations. These decentralized work arrangements were first named telework in the 1970s, defined as "work carried out in a location remote from the central offices or production facilities, where the worker has no personal contact with coworkers but is able to communicate with them electronically". Typically, the remote location is the home, though telework centers and remote offices are alternative locations. Since the introduction of home computers in the 1980s and laptops and mobile phones in the 1990s, increasing numbers of office workers have become able to work from different locations. Moreover, the shift from manufacturing to an information economy has expanded the number of jobs amenable to remote work. Telecommuting is referred to as telework, remote work, distributed work, virtual work, flexible work, flexplace, and distance work, among other labels.

Investigations of such flexible work locations began in earnest over 30 years ago (see Ramsower, 1983). Distributed work and telecommuting have become widespread practices, growing steadily in the United States and abroad. A 2002 study by the Gartner Group indicated that more than 60% of professional American employees worked in teams characterized by virtuality, and by 2012, nearly 3.3 million American workers telecommuted for at least half of the time. Globally, an international survey of 254 senior-level executives revealed that staff in two thirds of their global firms were involved in distributed work.

Early research heralded virtual teams as a promising design for integrating firms and taking maximum advantage of innovation-creating capabilities. They were likewise touted as means to permit flexibility in the "where" of tasks, to allow workers to meet household needs, and to enable organizations to adapt work arrangements to changing environments and labor needs. According to Gibson and Gibbs (2006: 453), the term "virtual" represents a wide variety of teams that are at least to some extent geographically dispersed (consisting of members spread across more than one location), mediated by technology (communicating using electronic tools such as e-mail or instant messaging), structurally dynamic (in which change occurs frequently among members, their roles, and relationships to each other), or nationally diverse (consisting of members with more than one national background). Much of the literature has focused on the challenges of virtual teams, while few have identified their assets and benefits, identifying strategies by which to increase team effectiveness and satisfaction. As technological ability and industry contexts are rapidly and continuously changing, virtual work represents a promising avenue of research as an ever-evolving, fundamental shift in how organizations have historically done business.

== Defining features ==
The four defining features of a virtual team – geographic dispersion, electronic dependence, national diversity, and dynamic structure – have unique effects and should be considered independently. For example, although electronic dependence sometimes coincides with geographic dispersion, this is not always the case; teams in the same office may use e-mail to avoid the trip up to another floor, and teams in different countries may prefer to meet face-to-face infrequently rather than use video calls. As such, there is conceptual agreement that virtuality is a multidimensional higher-order construct. Rather than being dichotomous "on-off" conditions, these four features of virtuality each represent a continuum, and the degree of difference influences the strength of its effects. These four factors will be explored in further detail below. Geographic dispersion refers to the degree of physical distance between team colleagues. A team that spans multiple continents is more dispersed than one whose participants are located in the same city, and this degree of dispersion in turn modulates the severity of outcomes. Electronic dependence refers to the degree of reliance on electronic tools such as e-mail or instant messaging for communications.

National diversity refers to the number of different nationalities represented on the team. Virtual teams may consist of members of a single nationality (e.g. a software team split between the American East and West Coasts, but who all share American nationality or a global team of Germans who work in different countries, but all share German nationality). Colleagues from different nations may bring different cultural values, mindsets, allegiances, and communication styles to the team.

Dynamic structure/membership refers to how often members leave and join the team, and to how stable or changeable members' roles are. Rather than having stable membership, many virtual teams are short-term and project-based, or involve frequent member turnover.

== Framework for processes ==
=== Overview ===
According to Gibson and Cohen (2003), the effectiveness of virtual teams is a function of enabling conditions, which are created and supported by managers and leaders, and do not work independently but rather in concert with one another through multiple performance strategies. Multiple design and implementation factors help to create the conditions that support virtual team effectiveness. These factors include organizational context, team design, technology use, team member characteristics, and work and team processes. Virtuality amplifies the challenges faced by teams. As teams become more virtual, they confront greater uncertainty and complexity, increasing the difficulty of the information processing and sensemaking tasks they face. Likewise, the greater the number and depth of differences that need to be managed in virtual teams, the greater the barriers to effectiveness. These teams must be designed, supported, and led effectively to be successful. When they are well supported, virtual teams enable the best talent irrespective of location, capitalize on each organization's unique competencies, and bring together people from different perspectives and knowledge bases, leading to higher levels of innovation. This orienting framework is explained in more detail below.

=== Enabling conditions ===
For virtual teams to perform well, three enabling conditions must be established: (1) shared understanding about the team's goals, tasks, work processes, and member characteristics; (2) integration or coordination across key organizational systems and structures; and (3) mutual trust in the team.

Shared understanding is the degree of cognitive overlap and commonality in beliefs, expectations, and perceptions about a given target. Virtual teams need to develop a shared understanding about their goals, their tasks, how to achieve them, and what each team member brings to the team.

Integration is the process of establishing ways in which the parts can work together to create value, develop products, or deliver services. The parts of the organization represented by virtual team members are likely to be highly differentiated in response to global competitive pressures and uncertain business environments, potentially hindering effective collaboration. Notably, the lower the level of integration, the greater the difficulty of developing shared understanding.

Mutual or collective trust is a shared psychological state that is characterized by an acceptance of vulnerability based on expectations of intentions or behaviors of others within the team. As members are geographically dispersed and often from different backgrounds, experiences, and cultures, trust is difficult to establish in virtual teams. Thus, it is how the team is designed and managed that creates enabling conditions.

=== Design factors ===
There are a number of structures and systems which critically enable virtual team success. Design of a virtual team involves structuring the interactions; what kind of communication tools are used; how much face-to-face time will be possible, etc. These design factors fall into five categories: context, group structure, technology, people, and process.

First, those structures that comprise the organizational context include education and training, rewards, reviews such as performance evaluation systems, and selection. Second, the virtual team's structure works to promote task accomplishment through goals, leadership, task design, and social structures. Third, information technology provides the infrastructure for virtual collaboration by allowing teams to communicate and coordinate their work. The challenge here is determining which technologies are appropriate for what tasks and when. Fourth, the people who work in virtual teams should possess certain capabilities to work effectively with others, such as sufficient task related knowledge and skills. Further, team members need to have a tolerance for ambiguity to deal with the unstructured communication that characterizes virtual teamwork. Finally, one's team and work processes can help or hinder the creation of enabling conditions. This includes the creation of effectives means of communication, decision making, and conflict resolution by leaders and managers.

=== Virtuality and degree of differences ===
As explored above, Gibson & Cohen (2003) indicated that the relationship between design factors and enabling conditions is moderated by the degree of virtuality and degree of differences. It follows that the greater the degree of virtuality and degree of differences, the more difficult it will be to establish supportive enabling conditions. The degree of virtuality includes the degree of electronic dependency and geographical dispersion, while the degree of differences includes the degree of variation in culture, language, organization, and function.

=== Outputs ===
The outputs of virtual work include all the things that result from the team's work processes. These can be organized into two categories: business outcomes and human outcomes. Possible business outcomes are goal achievement, productivity, timeliness, customer satisfaction, organization learning, innovation, and cycle time. Possible human outcomes include team member attitudes such as commitment, satisfaction, and longevity, i.e., the capacity to work together in the future.

Often, these judgments of performance are subjective and depend on the team's manager or other stakeholders in its social system. Studies have found that effectiveness can increase the greater the virtuality of a team, but only when many of the features in the framework are in place. For example, teams which fostered a shared identity by communicating consistently, developing relationships, and openly acknowledging cultural differences were better able to harness the energy and commitment of members. Such strong team identity may help to allow for constructive controversy which enables the open sharing of views, knowledge and perspective coinciding with members' identities. As Gibson and co-authors (2020) found, teams with high resilience, tolerance for ambiguity, and strong team identification experienced less intrapersonal identity conflict and therefore thrived more at work. Likewise, formalization processes that help to establish the global team as a source of identity, such as implementing rules and procedures early on and clarifying team boundaries, increase knowledge sharing and thus improve team effectiveness.

Gibson and her colleagues (2021) further found that virtual teams were more effective when they were able to recognize cues indicating when existing technologies had become constraints and strategically change their technology affordances to accommodate shifts in knowledge management activities. Teams which used a "dynamic connection repertoire" to co-evolve their purpose and technology were highly successful, as opposed to teams which failed to shift to different technologies as task needs changed.

Other studies have compared students working in purely virtual teams to purely face-to-face teams and found mixed results. Tan et al. found that teams which used their dialogue technique were more satisfied with decisions made in the team. One study found that a traditional team started out more satisfied than a virtual team. Then, in less than a year, the satisfaction of the virtual team rose and exceeded the satisfaction of the traditional team. Women were more satisfied than men with virtual teams and were also more satisfied compared to women in face-to-face teams. Team members that were more satisfied were more likely to have had training and used more communication methods compared to unsatisfied team members.

== Types ==
The most common types of virtual teams include:

1. Networked teams

2. Parallel teams

3. Project development teams

4. Work, production or functional teams

5. Service teams

6. Offshore ISD teams

7. Global Virtual Teams

=== Networked teams ===
Generally, networked teams are geographically distributed and not necessarily from the same organization. These teams are frequently created and just as frequently dissolved; they are usually formed to discuss specific topics where members from the area of expertise, possibly from different organizations, pitch their ideas in the same discussion. Depending on the complexity of the issue, additional members to the team may be added at any time. The duration these teams last may vary significantly depending on how fast or slow the issue is resolved.

=== Parallel teams ===
Parallel teams are highly task oriented teams that usually consist of specialized professionals. While they are generally only required for short spans of time, unlike networked teams, they are not dissolved after completion of the tasks. The team may be either internal or external to the organization.

=== Project development teams ===
Similar to parallel teams, these teams are geographically distributed and may operate from different time zones. Project development teams are mainly focused on creating new products, information systems or organizational processes for users and/or customers. These teams exist longer than parallel teams and have the added ability to make decisions rather than just make recommendations. Similar to networked teams, project development teams may also add or remove members of their team at any given time, as needed for their area of expertise.

=== Work, production or functional teams ===
These teams are totally function specific where they only work on a particular area within an organization (i.e. finance, training, research, etc.). Operating virtually from different geographical locations, these teams exist to perform regular or ongoing tasks.

=== Service teams ===
Service teams are geographically located in different time-zones and are assigned to a particular service such as customer support, network upgrades, data maintenance, etc. Each team works on providing the particular service in their daylight hours and at the end of day, work is delegated to the next team which operates in a different time zone so that there is someone handling the service 24 hours a day.

=== Offshore ISD teams ===
Offshore ISD outsourcing teams are independent service provider teams that a company can subcontract portions of work to. These teams usually work in conjunction with an onshore team. Offshore ISD is commonly used for software development as well as international R&D projects.

=== Global virtual teams ===
Global Virtual Teams (GVT) are defined as "a group of workers, formally recognized by the organization as a team, with members from different countries who are collectively accountable for outputs across locations, and who utilize technology to some degree to accomplish their work". These teams usually span multiple countries and excel at their ability to transfer best practices across sites, resulting in substantial improvements in operations. However, they may struggle with establishing effective communication which engenders trust and engages team members.

== Management ==
According to Maznevksi and Chudoba (2000), the life circle of virtual team management includes five stages:

1. Preparations

2. Launch

3. Performance management

4. Team development

5. Disbanding

=== Preparations ===
The initial task during the implementation of a team is the definition of the general purpose of the team together with the determination of the level of virtuality that might be appropriate to achieve these goals. Purpose is generally translated into certain action steps for people to on with a defined structure consisting of common goals, individual tasks and results. A number of factors may affect the performance of members of a virtual team. For example, team members with a higher degree of focused attention and aggregate lower levels of temporal dissociation (or flow ) may have higher performance. Further, members with higher degrees of attention focus may prefer asynchronous communication channels, while those with low levels of flow may prefer synchronous communication channels. These decisions are usually determined by strategic factors such as mergers, increase of the market span, cost reductions, flexibility and reactivity to the market, etc. Management-related activities taking place during the preparation phase include drafting a mission statement, personnel selection, task design, rewards system design, organizational integration, and choosing appropriate technologies for the tasks at hand.

=== Launch ===
In many cases, at the beginning of virtual teamwork, members make a point to meet each other face-to-face. Crucial elements of such a "kick-off" workshop are getting acquainted with the other team members, clarifying the team goals, clarifying the roles and functions of the team members, information and training how communication technologies can be used efficiently, and developing general rules for the teamwork. As a consequence, "kick-off" workshops are expected to promote clarification of team processes, trust building, building of a shared interpretative context, and high identification with the team.

Getting acquainted, goal clarification and development of intra-team rules are also usually accomplished during this phase. Initial field data that compares virtual teams with and without such "kick-off" meetings confirm a general positive impact on team effectiveness, although more differentiated research is necessary. Experimental studies demonstrate that getting acquainted before the start of computer-mediated work facilitates cooperation and trust.

=== Technology agility ===
As soon as possible after launch, virtual teams must agree upon norms for technology use. Technology is essential to members' interaction and communication. The electronic dependence integral to virtual work can however create logistical and technological constraints that limit informal spontaneous interacting and informal feedback, hindering knowledge interpretation and making corrective behavior more difficult. Therefore, team members must choose technology carefully, in order to offer the affordances needed at a given point in time, as each technology brings with it a number of affordances as well as constraints for interaction. An affordance is a purpose for use, and technology affordances refer to the mutually supportive relationship between human-endowed purposes to an activity and the technology use. Importantly, the need for certain affordances change over time as teams' tasks evolve. Gibson and her colleagues (2021) found that teams which were the most successful in progressing across different knowledge management activities used a "dynamic connection repertoire", which is symbiotic with the nature of the task as it evolves over time. Rather than keeping a static technology repertoire, teams which co-evolved their purpose and technology affordances were better able to sustain effectiveness. A series of psychosocial cues were identified by Gibson and her colleagues, which signal the need to shift to different technologies, because the current technology use is failing to meet the teams' needs. These cues pertained to how well information was being shared and understood by all team members, and the extent to which members were engaged in the team. Technologies which allow for higher media richness, such as video and screen-sharing, can help reduce inconsistencies in context and make communication more personal and effective.

=== Performance management ===
As time progresses in a virtual team, work effectiveness and a constructive team climate also have to be maintained using performance management strategies, such as those associated with leadership, conflict within virtual teams, and team members' motivation.

Leadership is a central challenge in virtual teams, as direct control is difficult when team managers are not at the same location as the team members. As a consequence, delegative management principles are considered that shift parts of classic managerial functions to the team members. However, team members only accept and fulfill such managerial functions when they are motivated and identify with the team and its goals, which is typically more difficult to achieve in virtual teams.Empirical research summarizes three leadership approaches that differ in the degree of team member autonomy: (1) electronic monitoring as an attempt to realize directive leadership over distance, (2) management by objectives (MBO) as an example for delegative leadership principles, and (3) self-managing teams as an example for rather autonomous teamwork.

With regard to conflict, predominant research issues have been conflict escalation and disinhibited communication ("flaming"), the fit between communication media and communication contents, and the role of non-job-related communication. One of the important needs for successful conflict resolution is the ability to have every member of the group together repeatedly over time. Effective dispersed groups show spikes in presence during communication over time, while ineffective groups do not have as dramatic spikes.

For the management of motivational and emotional processes, three groups of such processes have been addressed in empirical investigations so far: motivation and trust, team identification and cohesion, and satisfaction of the team members. Since most of the variables are originated within the person, they can vary considerably among the members of a team, requiring appropriate aggregation procedures for multilevel analyses (e.g. motivation may be mediated by interpersonal trust).

=== Team development ===
The success and satisfaction of virtual teams can be supported by personnel and team development interventions. The development of such training concepts should be based on an empirical assessment of the needs and/or deficits of the team and its members, and the effectiveness of the trainings should be evaluated empirically. The steps of team developments include assessment of needs/deficits, individual and team training, and evaluation of training effects. Assessing behaviors of the team members to identify behavioral cues may improve virtual team dynamics and increase team productivity. Behaviors may be assessed through DiSC assessments.

Virtual teams have become more pertinent due to COVID-19. For managers, some of the ways to foster virtual team growth and success include monitoring trust levels, focusing on communication improvements, fostering inclusion via emotional safety within a group, and actively discussing teamwork with the group frequently.

=== Disbanding and re-integration ===
Finally, while some teams remain ongoing and continue with new tasks or members, some virtual teams with shorter time frames go through a phase of disbanding and reintegration, during which members return to in-person offices or join other virtual projects. This disbanding and reintegration of team members is an important issue that has been neglected in both empirical and conceptual work on virtual teams. When virtual project teams have a short life cycle and reform again quickly, careful and constructive disbanding is crucial in order to maintain high motivation and satisfaction among employees. Members of transient project teams anticipate the end of the teamwork in the foreseeable future, which in turn can overshadow interaction with other team members and shared outcomes. The final stage of group development should be a gradual emotional disengagement that includes both sadness about separation and (in successful groups) joy and pride in the achievements of the team.

== Strengths ==
=== Team composition ===
Virtual teams may help to create a more equal workplace, discouraging age, race, and disability discrimination by forcing individuals to interact with others whose differences challenge their assumptions. Physically disadvantaged employees are also able to participate more in teams where communication is virtual, where they may not have previously been able to due to physical limitations of an office or other workspace. Virtual teams also create a more accessible workplace for those who care for children or other family members, or workers who prefer flexible work arrangements for a wide range of reasons. By enabling more flexible and equal working conditions, virtual teams significantly expand the pool of available expertise, thereby allowing firms to acquire the best possible candidates.

Moreover, virtual teams' use of communication technologies also helps to mitigate some problems of cultural diversity. For instance, email as a medium of communication does not transfer accents and carries fewer noticeable verbal language differences than voice communication. Cultural barriers are not removed from the team, but are instead shielded from view in situations where they are irrelevant. In fact, simply understanding team diversity and accommodating it can strengthen the relationship between team members of different cultures.

=== Innovation ===
When managed effectively, virtual teams can be highly effective in promoting innovation, creativity, and participation. For example, in Gibson and Gibbs' (2006) study of design team innovation, teams were more innovative as virtuality increased when they had a psychologically safe communication climate. Because a company is able to recruit from a larger pool of employees when using virtual teams, a growing amount of talent and distributed expertise is obtainable without the employee traveling often. The use of virtual teams also allows employees to participate in multiple projects within the company that are located on different sites. This in turn helps the company by allowing them to reuse existing resources so that they are not required to hire a new employee to do the same job.

Chidambaram and Bostrom (1993) found that virtual teams generate more ideas compared to traditional teams. Part of this effect can be attributed to cultural diversity, which has been shown to positively impact group decision-making. Combined with collaborative conflict management, groups of individuals from different cultural perspectives are more likely to actively participate in group decision making. The differing backgrounds and experiences of these group members also encourage creativity and create conflicting viewpoints, which make it more likely that multiple options are explored and considered.

=== Geographic reach ===
Multinational organizations often deploy global teams which span various national locations to serve as mechanisms for coordinating core operations across geographical and cultural boundaries. These virtual teams help to enhance knowledge sharing and integration across company locations, thereby expanding the geographic reach of firm operations at relatively low cost. Virtual teams further boost firms' ability to identify and transfer best practices across locations, resulting in a substantial improvement to the operational efficiency of each site while preventing any one site from "re-inventing the wheel".

=== National diversity ===
Though national diversity may sometimes lead to conflicts and poor internal communication among team members due to differing ideas of a team and its operation, when managed correctly, virtual teams enable firms to take advantage of diverse and creative viewpoints. Notably, virtual teams are susceptible to intrapersonal identity conflict and struggle to develop a shared team vision due to strong identification with subgroups. Yet, these coordination problems and obstacles to effective communication may be solved by actively understanding and accepting differences in cultures. A multi-country study, based on the GLOBE culture model conducted by Gibson and Gibbs (2006), found that virtual communication environments were experienced differently by people from different cultures. The culture dimension individualism-collectivism was most strongly and very significantly related to how positively or negatively team members experienced videoconferences and telephone conferences, compared to face-to-face meetings. People from collectivistic societies showed a stronger preference for face-to-face meetings and evaluated virtual meetings more negatively compared to people from more individualistic societies.

However, Haas (2006) discovered that a mix of locals and cosmopolitans was optimal for global virtual team performance. Research examining product development efforts in over 20 firms has shown that when diverse members of project teams combined their perspectives in a highly iterative way to improve integrated information flow, they were more innovative. This is echoed by Gibbs and Gibson's 2006 study which established that a psychologically safe communication climate where members feel comfortable asking questions can help bridge national differences, reduce ingroup/outgroup bias, and resolve conflicts, as teams who communicate openly are more likely to develop a common frame of reference and shared mental model. Ultimately, the exchange of diverse perspectives and information among global team members has been found to improve team and organizational performance through the generation of better knowledge sharing and higher quality solutions.

=== Reduction in relocation and travel ===
Virtual teams can save travel time and cost, significant expenses for businesses with multiple locations or having virtual clients located in multiple places. They also reduce disruption in the normal workday by not requiring an individual to physically leave their workspace. This improved efficiency can directly translate to saved costs for a company.

== Strategies to mitigate challenges of virtual work ==
Despite the improvement in telecommunication to overcome distance as an obstacle for collaboration, working in separate locations still increases the odds that people are not on common ground, and are not aware of it. Common ground, shared mutual knowledge, is an important element to successful communication and coordinated activity. Working separately and communicating through technology makes it more difficult to detect and resolve misunderstandings from a lack of common ground. As such, virtual teams often require a longer time to reach decisions.

However, virtual work has implications for relational impoverishment at work due to lower frequency of face-to-face interactions and lowered richness of communication. One major hurdle in drawing definitive conclusions is that studies of this innovation appear in dispersed literatures including information systems, logistics, industrial relations, psychology, operations, real estate, management, attracting the interest of scholars in multiple disciplines. Findings regarding challenges are presented below, but many mainstream models, largely developed with face-to-face workers in mind, often fail to account for the way telecommuters and virtual workers have challenged traditional labor structures.

=== Technology and common ground ===
When team members are highly dispersed, members are embedded in different external contexts and thus have less shared contextual knowledge, leading participants to take for granted common knowledge. Sole and Edmondson (2002) call this "situated knowledge," finding evidence that the majority of conceptual misunderstandings resulted from lack of awareness of or failure to appropriate such knowledge. Such lack of mutual knowledge of each other's situations increases coordination problems in acquiring knowledge and resources. Transactive memory is difficult to establish in virtual teams as it is often not transferred to new members, contextual knowledge is not kept or well-documented, and communication is indirect or infrequent. Development of this type of common ground is particularly difficult in virtual teams which are structurally dynamic or experience high turnover, as teams with a short history together tend to lack effective patterns of information sharing and working together, limiting the amount and variety of information that can be communicated across team members.

One way to develop common ground in virtual teams is to develop a psychologically safe communication climate which acts as a moderating variable that can overcome mistrust and turn the team's fluid membership into a source of new ideas and expertise. A supportive communication climate includes variables such as participation in decision-making, encouraging members to speak up, raising differences for discussion, engaging in spontaneous and informal communication, providing unsolicited information, remaining open to new ideas and perspectives, and bridging differences by suspending judgment. This helps to create trust and reduce perceptions of risk and uncertainty about members' motives, in turn creating incentives to build a shared history.

Another way to develop common knowledge rests on managers' ability to act as politicians to manage the power dynamic inside and outside the team. This may reduce members' hesitancy to share information, leading to enhanced innovation. A study by Gibbs and her colleagues (2021) indicates that managers can also bridge imbalances in situated knowledge during meetings by discussing trivial topics and surfacing taken-for-granted assumptions as a way to elicit differing opinions and hidden knowledge. In one instance, a manager increased dialogue among team members by deliberately refraining from giving people answers in order to encourage them to cooperate and co-create knowledge. Though more difficult than in collocated teams, careful management and co-presence strategies can successfully establish common ground among members of a virtual team.

=== Uneven distribution of information ===
Errors in the distribution of messages are more common in technology than face-to-face interaction, leading to a lack of common ground. When digital technology replaces face-to-face communication, it is often difficult to keep track of the messages that have been both sent and received by a receiver and vice versa. For instance, if collaborators have two email addresses, a primary and a secondary one, some messages may be sent by the server to the primary addresses and some to the secondary addresses, leading to information loss and confusion among team members. Intimacy is further threatened as perceived electronic mediation increases because such mediation leads to uneven information transfer and coordination challenges and reduces the amount of informal interaction, as the number of casual encounters and unplanned conversations is much higher among collocated colleagues.

Simultaneously, differences in native language and status- the "prestige, esteem, worth, or relative social position of an individual or group"- inhibit open dialogue and can lead to uneven participation, one-way flows of knowledge, and exclusion. These status differences are subjective and socially constructed through interpersonal processes of stratification that play out in both verbal and nonverbal communication. Consequently, teams which foster an open dialogic environment through conversational turn-taking, active listening, and energy-enhancing practices achieve better participation and overcome status differences, in turn boosting collective intelligence and limiting miscommunications.

Strategies to mitigate uneven distribution of information include structure-enabling practices which promote equal participation, such as regular calls, clear agendas established in advance of meetings, rotating presentations to give voice to lower-status members, and post-call follow ups to ensure a sense of role clarity and predictability. Furthermore, fostering knowledge repositories which seek to not only create new knowledge but record and catalogue existing knowledge helps to mitigate uneven information distribution and facilitate ongoing knowledge transfer. Managers can make a big difference in team participation by establishing dialogic practices which build rapport and trust, strengthen team communication and participation, and invite input from everyone. These practices help to bridge status differences and ensure team members are on the same page.

=== Differences in what information is salient ===
Computer-mediated communication (CMC) reduces nonverbal cues about interpersonal affections such as tone, warmth, and attentiveness, which contribute to message clarity and communication richness, and collaborators who use CMC often use more direct styles of communication with fewer social cues than those in face-to-face conditions. Zhao (2003) found that communicators use physical and linguistic "co-presence"- the subjective perception of closeness versus distance to make inferences about one another's knowledge. Virtual workers are likely to have reduced contact and exposure to strong organizational structures and processes (including organizational dress, symbols, rituals, and ceremonies) that typically foster organizational identification. Difficulty in interpreting knowledge reduces experimentation, which may impact the improvisation processes vital to engendering innovation.

In face-to-face interaction, the speaker makes the importance of a message known through tone of voice, facial expression, and bodily gestures. The receiver may acknowledge understanding through exact feedback called "back-channel" communication, such as head nods, brief verbalizations like "yeah" and "okay," or smiles. These methods of emphasis and feedback ensure parties are on common ground. However, these methods are often lost in digital means of communication. For example, in an e-mail exchange, the point of the message as intended by the sender may be overlooked, misinterpreted, or given different priority. Furthermore, messages met with silence are highly ambiguous and can act as a barrier to establishing common ground. For instance, silence can be due to technical problems within the technology that mediates the parties involved in communication, or it can be due to the fact that one of the partners is out of town and cannot reply to the message. Silence can also be taken in many ways, as agreement, disagreement, passive aggression, and indifference, or in the case of dispersed groups, that the message was undelivered. Silence may lead to conflict because it blurs the notion of what is known and unknown in the group, signaling the absence of common ground. Fully implementing "back-channel" communication can be time-consuming. The lack of convenient cues in digital communication make dispersed collaboration less conducive for the establishment of mutual knowledge.

The challenges presented by electronic dependence may be mitigated through the use of technologies allowing for higher media richness, which help to provide context and nuance in virtual communications. Remote collaborations may be enhanced by co-presence design or the development of tools to enhance perceived co-presence such as online avatars or added conference call features like visual representation, turn taking, or private chat. Further, Maznevski and Chudoba (2000) found that developing predictable temporal rhythms of technology and routines of media usage improved close working relationships. Subsequent research has also highlighted the importance of co-presence for psychological well-being and productivity.

Moreover, practices such as informal conversations among colleagues, virtual "water cooler chat," personal introductions, and discussions on trivial topics help to build connectedness and trust among virtual teams. For instance, many companies during the COVID-19 pandemic introduced 1:1 buddies, virtual coffee breaks, and digital town halls in order to increase co-presence and team identification. Team members who trust one another are more likely to ask follow-up questions for clarification, avoid snap judgments born out of miscommunication, and accept others' advice and information. This in turn reduces the challenges associated with lost social cues during digital communication.

=== Differences in speed, timing, and responsiveness ===
Speed and timing of communication is inevitably not as uniformed in digital communication as it is in face-to-face interaction. This is due to the fact that some parties have more restricted access to communication than others. The differences in relative speed and timing of feedback and conference calls are aggravated by differences in time zones, which can sharpen status differences and bolster resentment from sidelined locations. One part of the team on one side of the world may be asleep during another part's normal workday, and the group has to work around this. These issues may be ameliorated by alternating night and morning calls for each location, having two separate meetings for different zones, or asking certain locations to participate in calls at unusual hours.

In some cases, the problems arising from differences in relative speed may be attributed instead to a lack of conscientiousness on the part of the slower partners. In fact, a fluctuating feedback cycle is more destructive than a uniformed feedback cycle of a slower pace. Further, McLarnon et al. (2019) uncovered that regular feedback exchanges demonstrated a more substantial indirect effect on team performance than scenarios where feedback was only provided post-project or obtained weekly without distribution to peers. Consequently, establishing a structured system for regular peer feedback can significantly enhance intra-team processes and overall functionality within virtual teams. Asynchronous communication tends to be more difficult to manage and requires much greater coordination than synchronous communication. As Gibson et al. (2011) found, developing consistent, time-patterned routines of communication may help to build close working relationships. Technology affordances such as a public forum where team members can post and reply to questions may also encourage timely responses and enhance ongoing knowledge transfer.

In other instances, low responsiveness stems from cultural norms which dictate how quickly workers are expected to respond and when they can be reached. For example, one study found that Western Australians may express a "can do" attitude and a direct communication style while Jamaicans tend to be more conflict-avoidant in organizational settings and have a more fluid orientation to time. These cultural differences play an important role in how power and status differences are fostered and how they impact participation in teams. Rather than "sweeping them under the rug," it is important to acknowledge differences in culture or opinion so they can be addressed through adaptation and agreeable solutions. Shared norms which bridge the differences can help resolve potential conflicts in preferences.

Virtual teams have also historically highlighted a generational gap, as many older executives and senior managers do not have as much experience with computer technology as their younger counterparts. These senior members must then exert extra energy to catch up to the younger generation and navigate new means of communicating. This difficulty is less pertinent today, as most workers have some level of fluency with digital media and firms often provide training to equalize workers' knowledge of communication tools.

== Emerging issues ==
=== COVID-19 pandemic ===
As a result of the COVID-19 pandemic, the virtual dimension of teamwork has gained greater prominence everywhere from social media to academic scholarship. Research on remote work has largely focused on outcomes differentiating between individuals who do and do not engage in remote work. However, as Zhang, Yu and Marin (2021) point out, during the COVID-19 pandemic, many employees were forced to work remotely. The beginning of the pandemic was marked by a rapid transition to virtual work, closures of traditional workspaces, physical distancing requirements, difficulties distributing technology and adapting to at-home work conditions, and feelings of isolation and hopelessness among newly virtual employees.

Within this, the employee satisfaction and health outcomes associated with virtual work, largely neglected by pre-pandemic literature, have quickly come to the forefront of management research. Pre-pandemic studies found that the high levels of perceived electronic dependence and lack of copresence which often accompany virtual work can negatively affect critical psychological states of experienced meaningfulness, experienced responsibility, and knowledge of results. Likewise, while a supportive communication climate predicts satisfaction and commitment and includes variables such as participation in decision-making and communication openness, these factors are more difficult to establish in virtual settings. Thus, satisfaction among the team members of a virtual team has been shown to be less positive than satisfaction among face-to-face teams. This drop in satisfaction is due in part to difficulties building trust without face-to-face communications, a necessary part of high-performing virtual teams. However, effective management and adherence to proper goal setting principles specific to the nature of work virtual teams require can lead to improved team effectiveness. If a team and its corresponding management is not prepared for the challenges of a virtual team, this will be difficult to achieve.

Recent research by Zhang, Yu, and Marin (2021: 802) discovered that workers had a generally positive attitude towards working at home, citing the availability of collaboration and communication tools, increased productivity, and remote learning and flexible work hours. Conversely, workers frequently complained that long hours of teleconferencing could be draining, individuals' capacity to work remotely was impeded by suboptimal home office setups, information-sensitive work was susceptible to cyber-security attacks, and that decentralized set-ups harmed work team engagement. While some workers experienced improved work-life balance due to spending more time with family, others reported their work-life balance was harmed due to difficulties maintaining the boundary between family and work.

=== Care in connecting ===
Rather than "social distancing," Gibson (2020) proposes the approach Care in Connecting, which acknowledges the need for caution in terms of physical proximity, but also promotes the urgent need for compassion that individuals and organizations provide and receive. Care in Connecting centers around three principles which counter the prejudice, isolation, and hopelessness associated with social distancing: inclusion, copresence, and vitality.

Care in Connecting creates inclusion when diverse voices are heard and incorporated online. A number of scholars addressing inclusion and intercultural collaboration have revealed the importance of recognizing the uniqueness of individual constituents while also cultivating a sense of belonging to a collectivity. Research shows that members who identify with their team are more likely to display desirable individual workplace outcomes such as helping behavior, organizational citizenship behavior, lowered social undermining and social loafing, lessened workplace bullying, and fewer turnover intentions. Organizations prioritizing inclusion during the pandemic have adopted approaches including overtime pay, unlimited sick days, paid leaves of absence, free trials of higher education to help connect job seekers to opportunities, and donated medical supplies. These inclusionary practices involve understanding employees' unique experiences and avoiding assumptions, stereotypes, and grand generalizations.

Care in Connecting also creates co-presence, the experience of psychological proximity achievable online, to counteract feelings of isolation felt as a result of social distancing (Gibson, 2020: 166). Key to virtual team effectiveness is the team's ability to understand which tool is most effective given the task and to selectively tailor combinations of technology to achieve copresence. Many organizations have sought to implement new practices during the pandemic to build a sense of copresence by ensuring access to technology and establishing the human element. Examples include purchasing laptops and audio equipment for workers, loaning tablets to students, implementing virtual coffee breaks or lunches, inviting workers' children to join meetings, and promoting opportunities to connect as human beings.

Finally, Care in Connecting can enable vitality, a sense of psychological and physical energy, to address the sense of hopelessness engendered by social distancing. A significant body of research indicates that people both mimic and feel the emotions displayed by others and can receive and experience energy from interpersonal interactions. Organizations which provided examples of positivity and resilience in online interactions were able to spark positive emotional contagion and increased vitality. Many organizations communicated simple messages of care and composure, offered morning meditation sessions, allowed pets on screen for relaxation, conducted online yoga and fitness sessions, and sent out care packages to employees.

=== Emerging research ===
There is still much unknown about the impact of COVID-19 on virtual teamwork, particularly in how employees will respond in the long-term to the blurring of public and private space and how the reorganization of reopened sites will unfold. Emerging research suggests that returning to work in the "new normal" after being out of work or teleworking to some capacity creates issues with employee focus, engagement, and mental reattachment to upcoming work. Furthermore, Shao et al. (2021) argue that workers' newfound flexibility in working from home or at the office is impacted by stressors they encountered on the previous day. This research has implications for understanding the driving factors of daily work location choices, and how telework will unfold in a post-Covid world.

Another research concern centers on the nonnegligible chance of community transmission in the workplace which poses a threat to returning workers. While many workplaces shut down following the onset of the COVID-19 pandemic, others in essential industries had to remain operational, thus exposing employees to virus dangers. However, firms varied significantly in the degree to which they took action to protect their employees. Steinbach, Kautz and Korsgaard (2021) found that these firm compensation actions were associated with a growth in positive stakeholder sentiment. The reintegration of workers into face-to-face work settings has also launched academic debate on privacy and ethical concerns surrounding mandatory vaccination requirements and/or weekly testing. While our knowledge of online collaboration has yet to incorporate the dynamic urgency created by the pandemic, it is very likely that closures of traditional workplaces, physical distancing requirements, and the difficulties firms face reopening sites will fundamentally shift research on virtual work.

== See also ==
- Cultural diversity
- Distributed development
- Job characteristic theory
- Remote work
- Resident (engineer)
- Swift trust theory
- Teamwork
- Virtual business
- Virtual community of practice
- Virtual management
- Virtual workplace
- Virtual_project_management
- Virtual volunteering
- Work design
