= Distributed agile software development =

Software development methods

Distributed agile software development is a research area that considers the effects of applying the principles of agile software development to a globally distributed development setting, with the goal of overcoming challenges in projects which are geographically distributed.

The principles of agile software development provide structures to promote better communication, which is an important factor in successfully working in a distributed setting. However, not having face-to-face interaction takes away one of the core agile principles. This makes distributed agile software development more challenging than agile software development in general.

== History / Research ==
The increasing globalization with the aid of novel capabilities provided by the technological efficacy of the Internet has led software development companies to offshore their development efforts to more economically attractive areas. This phenomenon began in the 90s, while its strategic importance was realized in the 2000s. Most initial related studies also date from around this time.

During this time, the Agile Manifesto was released, which represents an evolution from the prevailing heavyweight approaches to software development. This naturally led to the question, "can distributed software development be agile?". One of the first comprehensive reviews trying to answer this question was done in 2006. By studying three organizations, they found that "careful incorporation of agility in distributed software development environments is essential in addressing several challenges to communication, control, and trust across distributed teams." Later, in 2014, a systematic literature review (SLR) was done to identify the main problems in getting agile to work in a distributed fashion. In 2019, a similar SLR was done.

== Opportunities ==
In the distributed environment, one might have difficulties in keeping track of everyone's workload and contribution towards the deliverable. Through adoption of agile principles and practices, the visibility is made clearer as there are multiple iterations where one can visualize the issues or criticalities on the initial stages of the project. Continuous integration of programming code, which is one of the focal pieces of agile software development, additionally serves to reduce setup of the executive issues. Adopting of agile principles appears to positively affect correspondence between groups as advancement in cycles makes it simpler for members to see the short-term objectives. Sprint reviews can be seen as a powerful method to improve external correspondence whilst they help to share data about the features and prerequisite conditions between partners or stakeholders. Agile practices also assist in building trust between various teams associated with the process by stimulating consistent communication and conveyance of programming deliverables. As indicated by an investigation made by Passivara, Durasiewicz and, Lassenius, the software quality and correspondence are improved and communication and coordinated effort are more regular comparatively as a result of the Scrum approach utilized in the undertaking. Additionally, the inspiration of colleagues was accounted for to have expanded. Along these lines, adopting agile practices in a distributed environment has demonstrated to be valuable for the quality of the project and its execution. Thus, these can be seen as some of the advantages achieved by combining agile in distributed development, however, the list is exhaustive. The main benefits can be listed as follows:

=== Enhanced inter and intra cultural diversity ===
The distributed environment brings about a sense of global mindset over the local mindset, where the team can exchange and accept the other's ideas, perceptions, culture, aesthetics etc. Members from a wide range of cultures get the opportunity to gain and share knowledge from their associates, from an alternate point of view. In this manner, they can carry new plans to the task by considering out of the box.

=== Flexible working plans ===
The team members can be benefited with abundant freedom and opportunities on the way of working, with the sole aim being completing the tasks and handing in the deliverables on time. This also makes way for an expanded duty to the organization. In that way, the employees can balance both their professional and personal lives, and hence, the work-life balance can also be achieved that way.

=== Traversing time-zones ===
The teams can span multiple time-zones, in this manner access as long as the 24-hour limit can be achieved. This increases productivity as people are hired all around the globe. The job to be done is never put to a halt as someone is always around to handle the issue. This also ensures the work is carried out 24/7 around the Sun and there is almost no down-time. As a distributed environment focuses more on productivity and performance, the handing-off of the work helps in accomplishing the task.

=== Individuals with incapacities and mobility limitations ===
As mentioned, the distributed agile environment establishes more importance on productivity and performance, rather than presence. This benefits people with disabilities as they have the freedom to work from an environment that is comfortable for them and contribute to the deliverable. This scenario is also applicable when the employee cannot be present in office and clock-in the hours, he can work from home to complete the tasks, thus, not affecting the deliverable.

=== Increased levels of prosperity ===
Working in a distributed agile environment ensures an enhanced level of prosperity and well-being, both of the individuals and of the company. This is because there is not much stress on only one individual to complete the work as the work is distributed to multiple people across the globe. Thus, this ensures physical and mental well-being. Also, as multiple people contribute their part and it goes through a number of iterations, the end quality of the work is enhanced, which is beneficial for the company. Hence, it is a win-win situation for both the company and its employees.

=== Reduced travel costs ===
Working in a distributed environment often brings up the need for discussions and meetings on the targets, deadlines, work, etc. However, this adoption of agile principles and practices in a distributed environment helps in reducing the travel costs as it opens up the platform to communicate via video conferencing and other feasible options. This breaks down the need for physical presence, and enhances the idea of face-to-face interaction, so the meetings can be conducted from any part of the world and be made accessible to the others in the team.

=== Iterative idea of agile ===
As the progress of the work is in an iterative fashion, a regular check can be done to track the status of the deliverable and if all the members are on the same page in the level of understanding. Also, this way makes it easier in identifying errors and bugs and can be corrected in the earlier stages as the process goes through multiple iterations. The increased input in each stage of the work results in improved quality of deliverable.

=== Extensive pool of HR ===
As the same work is being carried out in different parts of the world, it increases the range of abilities of the group by getting to a more extensive pool of Human Resources worldwide. This introduces the need for all the HRs acting as one mind to enforce collaborations and decision-making in different verticals and horizontals within an organization, as well as to communicating with stakeholders and prioritizing the deliverable.

=== Reduces office space ===
The distributed agile environment enhances the idea of remote working, hence the need for expanding office spaces to accommodate more employees is not required anymore. Also, the different work-related things like electricity, computers, car-parking lots, etc. are not of major concern as the employees have the liberty to work from their desired environment. This, in a way, is beneficial as it helps in saving a huge amount of money that would be spent on these overhead expenses otherwise. Iterative improvement with continuous delivery to the client is a central practice in agile software improvement, and one that legitimately identifies one of the significant difficulties of an offshore turn of events: diminished perceivability into project status. Regular physical meetings allow team leaders, project managers, clients, and customers to keep track of the progress of the project by the measure of working programming they have obtained.

== Challenges & Risks ==
Distributed software development has its own inherent challenges due to spatial, temporal, and socio-cultural differences between distributed teams. Combining it with agile principles and practices, in turn, increases the severity of the risks involved, as both methods are in direct contrast with each other. Agile software development was originally designed to be used by co-located teams, as it is based on informal communication and close collaboration. Distributed development, however, requires formal communication, clear standards, set guidelines and rigid structure. This section describes the risks and challenges involved in distributed agile software development as a result of the aforementioned compatibility issues.

=== Challenges ===
As a result of the incompatibility with which one is faced in combining agile principles and practices in a distributed setting, some of the challenges which can arise are as follows:

==== Documentation ====
Offshore organizations favor plan-driven design where detailed requirements are sent offshore to be constructed. This conflicts with the common practice of agile teams who give documentation a lower priority. The result of this situation is that misunderstandings are a lot more likely to arise.

==== Pair programming ====
Pair programming, where two programmers work side by side to work on a particular problem is a common agile practice. It has been shown to yield better products in less time while keeping the programmers content in the process. Because of the distance between teams this is a lot harder to achieve.

==== Different time zones ====
Depending on the time zone of each distributed team it makes it more challenging to arrange meetings at times when both teams are available. The situation can easily arise in which one team member is available and the other is not for meetings. This especially is a problem if an immediate task has components of the program which are tightly coupled, in such a case one team would not be able to proceed without the feedback of the other.

==== Teaching ====
In a distributed setting the downside of not being able to practice close communication is most felt with inexperienced developers who need to go through a training phase. Training employees who are not co-located is challenging, think of the differences in background and cultural differences which make it difficult to bring these inexperienced team members up to speed. Because of this, alternative ways of teaching need to be considered.

==== Distribution of work ====
With regards to distribution of work we want to avoid the architecture to reflect the team's geographical distribution by distributing the work based on the location. It is better to distribute tasks relating to a single user story across the whole team, thinking in terms of the stories, not the components. Over specialization by geographical location and/or component is a sign that your team is dealing badly with the communication challenges posed to the distributed teams. This over specialization has the unintended consequence of changing the product to suit the development, not the customer's requirements.

=== Risks ===
A study done in 2013 has tried to consolidate the literature on risk management in distributed Agile development. A more comprehensive study has tried to categorize the risk factors for distributed Agile projects in, this was done utilizing both research literature and real-world experience from thirteen IT organizations. For the sake of brevity, the full list of 45 risk factors, with corresponding management techniques is omitted. Instead, a brief summary of the main categories and overall management techniques is given.

==== Software Development Life Cycle ====
This category comprises the risk factors related to various activities of software development like customer specification of requirements and planning, modeling, construction and deployment of software application. Many of the risk factors in this category stem from ineffective knowledge sharing. Unclear objectives, requirements, differences in practices of standard processes or inconsistencies across designs to name a few. Many of these risks can be managed by making sure that knowledge is shared effectively. More specifically, make sure that the objective of the project is crystal clear across teams, as well as the requirements. Automate and standardize as much of the development cycle as possible, so that each team is working with the same technology stack and infrastructure. In short, ensure that everyone is on the same page.

==== Project Management ====
Project management relates to tasks such as project planning, project organizing, project staffing, project directing and control. This category involves risks due to interactions between development activities, and managerial activities. The adoption of distributed Agile development will transform the way in which the project needs to be managed. If this is not done carefully, risks might include a lower initial velocity, teams reorganizing every sprint or, a lack of uniformity in multisite team's capabilities.

==== Group Awareness ====
Risk factors related to a lack of group awareness are grouped in this category. Group awareness requires intensive communication, coordination, collaboration, and trust among the group members. Co-located teams achieve this awareness more easily, as it flows more naturally from being in the same physical location. To manage the risks involved with a lack of group awareness, spatially dispersed teams will have to use a more disciplined approach in communication using the latest technological tools. Practices such as co-locating initially, to set the track for the project, have proved to be effective in managing risk.

==== External Stakeholder Collaboration ====
These factors relate to the collaboration with customers, vendors, and third-party developers. Managing its risks boils down to making sure that the coordination and communication with these external actors are done efficiently and clearly.

==== Technology Setup ====
Risk factors that arise due to inappropriate tool usage are grouped in this category. For example, a lack of communication structure can be solved by providing the teams with the means to do video conference calls. Besides that, choosing the right tools to use during a project is important. This can vary across projects, teams and use cases, so an analysis beforehand on the tools to use is recommended.

== Tools and best practices ==
=== Communication ===
One of the most important factors in overcoming the challenges faced with distributed agile software development is to improve communication. This means minimizing the time it takes to set up and tear down a communication session and favor video conferencing over voice conferencing if it is available.

Face-to-face contact opportunities with the whole team should be encouraged in order to help build rapport. It is beneficial to do this at the start to set out a plan to which the team can adhere throughout the project. In addition, it is also beneficial in the last few iterations before the release of the final deliverable.

=== Time-zone differences ===
One option with regards to dealing with the problem of availability for meetings due to time zones is to appoint a representative for the team which serves as an intermediary for the two teams having formed good rapport with both. Another option is to use nested Scrum with multilevel reporting and multiple daily Scrum meetings.

A solution for having Scrum meetings in teams which cope with time-zone differences is making a distinction between local team meetings and global Scrum meetings. Each team has a local meeting at the start of their day and a global meeting at another time of the day. This is only possible if their working days have overlapping time.

=== Keeping up with agile practices ===
Due to the distributed nature, a team might veer off of solid established agile practices. Therefore, there should be someone with the role of the coach that keeps the team on track. They should also take it upon themselves to think of alternatives for the distributed work environment using agile practices.

To keep every team member informed about the adopted agile approach, it is important to maintain documentation for the project. This improves the group collaboration in using agile principles and practices in a distributed software development setting . For this, various tools can be used which support the team in maintaining the documentation.

=== Use of tools ===
Various tools and platforms can be used to improve communication in a distributed setting. These are even more essential than in a non-distributed setting in order to minimize the virtual distance between the distributed teams.

==== Communication ====
There are various tools available to support communication in distributed software development. Asynchronous tools like e-mail, synchronous tools like audio and video conferencing software and hybrid tools like instant messaging provide team members with the means to have the necessary meetings and communications. Another example is tools that support social networking to create a shared experience between team members across locations.

==== Project management ====
To guide the project and make sure that all teams and team members have a clear vision of what work has to be done, project management platforms like issue management tools should be used.

==== Development tools ====
To provide a shared experience for every team member, every team member should have access to the same tools for their development. Having the same software configuration management tools linked to project management tools enables developers to work at the same pace and communicate about the development in a similar way.

==== Knowledge management ====
To give every team member access to the same knowledge about the product and the development, tools like Wiki software or knowledge bases can be used.

== Compatibility with the Agile Manifesto ==
The values and principles of the Agile Manifesto have been explored in their applicability in a distributed work environment in 12 case studies. The studies have followed software companies that applied distributed agile software development in their projects. Among the 12 cases, 10 onshore companies were located in the U.S. and seven offshore companies were located in India. The findings are summarized in the following table:

Characteristics promoted by the Agile Manifesto	Case 1	Case 2	Case 3	Case 4	Case 5	Case 6	Case 7	Case 8	Case 9	Case 10	Case 11	Case 12
Values												
Individuals and interactions over processes and tools	✓	✓	✓	✓	✓	✓	✓	✓	✓	✓	✓	✓
Working software over comprehensive documentation	✓	✓	✓	✓	✓			✓	✓	✓	✓	✓
Customer collaboration over contract negotiation				✓	✓	✓			✓			
Responding to change over following a plan	x				x	x					✓	
Principles												
Early and continuous delivery of valuable software	✓	✓	✓	x	x	x		✓			✓	
Welcome changing requirements even late in development												
Deliver working software frequently	✓	✓	✓				✓	✓	✓	✓	✓	✓
Business people and developers work together throughout project	✓			✓	✓	✓			✓			
Build projects around motivated individuals and support and trust them				✓	✓	✓		✓				
Face-to-face conversation within the development team	✓	✓	✓	✓	✓	✓	✓	✓	✓	✓	✓	✓
Working software is the primary measure of progress	✓	✓	✓	✓	✓	✓	✓		✓	✓		✓
Promote sustainable development to maintain constant pace indefinitely		✓	✓							✓	✓	✓
Continuous attention to technical excellence and good design			✓	✓	✓			✓		✓		
Simplicity is essential											✓	
Self-organizing teams			✓				✓			✓	✓	
Team regularly adjusts behavior to enhance effectiveness										✓	✓	

From this we learn that all case studies emphasized the first value of the Agile Manifesto which states that individuals and interactions should be valued over processes and tools. The Agile Manifesto prefers working software over comprehensive documentation without necessarily negating documentation completely. This value is also reflected in the majority of the cases. Only four cases have been identified which emphasize the importance of customer collaboration over contract negotiation. As can clearly be seen from the table the fourth value has been adopted the least out of all the values by the software companies: “instead of strictly following the agile development practices as commonly defined, the companies continuously tweak them to fit the evolving needs of their projects”. With regards to agile principles it isn't a surprise that face-to-face conversation with the development team has been valued by all the studies. This was simulated electronically between the onshore and offshore teams. On whether to be open to change requirements even late in development none of the software companies in the study provided details. By this we can assume that it wasn't considered as important as some of the other principles.
