= Swift trust theory =

Organizational theory

Swift trust is a form of trust occurring in temporary organizational structures, which can include quick starting groups or teams. It was first explored by Debra Meyerson and colleagues in 1996. In swift trust theory, a group or team assumes trust initially, and later verifies and adjusts trust beliefs accordingly.

Traditionally, trust has been examined in the context of long-term relationships. The establishment of trust has been thought to rely largely on the history of a group and the interactions between members. This traditional view of trust generally assumes that trust builds over time. However, this view is becoming problematic with the increase in globalization, change in technologies, and an increased reliance on temporary teams by organizations. Meyerson et al. propose that swift trust provides the necessary, initial, cognitive confidence for a temporary team to interact as if trust were present. However, swift trust requires an individual to verify that a team can manage vulnerabilities and expectations.

== Trust in teams ==
Researchers study trust at the group or team level because of trust's relationship to overall group performance. High levels of trust are related to increased positive attitudes toward the organization, increased attitudinal commitment to the group, and team satisfaction. Trust is also related to higher levels of autonomy in the team. Therefore, it is interesting that groups that are short lived, and do not experience traditional forms of trust building, are still able to experience the benefits of trust within the group.

== Conventional models of trust ==
The trust literature distinguishes two antecedents of trust: trustworthiness and trust propensity. Trustworthiness is the ability, benevolence, and integrity of a trustee, and trust propensity is a dispositional willingness to rely on others. Traditional forms of trust formation center on the "unique effects of ability, benevolence, and integrity on trust; the mediating role of trust in explaining the relationships between trustworthiness, trust propensity, and behavioral outcomes" (p. 917). There are three dimensions of trustworthiness that have significant, unique relationships with trust (ability, benevolence, and integrity). These trustworthiness dimensions reflect both cognition-based and affect-based sources of trust. Of course, trust often still requires a leap beyond the expectations that ability, benevolence, and integrity can create. Trust propensity may then play a role in driving that leap.

This categorization of antecedents of trust is partially relevant, but not a sufficient explanation for the formation of swift trust. Situations that arise that would require a form of swift trust may be unable to foster the antecedents necessary for traditional trust formation. Integrity and ability would not have adequate time to establish themselves in a swift starting group setting. However, benevolence as an antecedent may be helpful in the explanation of swift trust in that it is a more affective acknowledgment of mutual concern inherent in the relationship. Additionally, higher levels of trust propensity might foster greater levels of trust in a situation that would require swift trust.

== Conventional models of time-dependent trust ==
Deterrence-based trust occurs when an individual fears punishment; as a result, the individual holds true to his or her responsibilities. In knowledge-based trust, some knowledge is known of the trustee and this allows the trustor to understand and predict the trustee's actions. Identification-based trust allows for one member to act as an agent for another member because they identify with each other based on their common goals and shared values.

There is also an institutional, or impersonal, form of trust, which, according to Luhmann (1979), is based on the norms of an institution rather than emotional bonds or past history between members. For example, institutional trust is what allows seeming strangers to engage in contracts, due to the faith in the legal system.

However, both the interpersonal and impersonal forms of trust assume that the relationship will have some longevity. Benefits that a team gains from being trustful tend to be long term, and conversely, the benefits of acting in an untrustful manner are generally short term. Because both the impersonal and interpersonal forms for trust assume some sort of longevity, swift trust addresses the ability of a temporary team to form and maintain high levels of trust.

== In organizations ==
Given the fact that temporary work teams are frequently utilized in an organization, it is necessary to understand how trust is being formed within these teams. Generally, trust is assumed to build over time, with a trustor updating beliefs about the trust-related attributes of the trustee.

Swift trust is an explanation of trust development in these temporary, nonconventional teams. Swift trust is "a unique form of collective perception and relating that is capable of managing issues of vulnerability, uncertainty, risk, and expectations". Instead of trust being an evidence-driven information process, swift trust is created from category-driven processes. Because a temporary group is under time constraints, the group only has time for quick categorization of team members. This can result in groupings based on surface characteristics like tone of voice or style of dress.

Meyerson et al. propose that a temporary team interacts as if trust were present, but then must verify that the team can manage expectations. In other words, because time is limited, the team assumes trust initially, and later verifies and adjusts trust beliefs accordingly. Although swift trust can still be a strong form of trust, it is conditional and in need of reinforcement and calibration by actions.

As previously mentioned, trust is not always time-dependent. One of the ways researchers examine the interaction between trust and time is through the classic prisoner's dilemma experiments. In these experiments, many participants were willing to share money with a stranger in the hope that he or she would also share his or her money, allowing both participants to split the money equally. The results indicated that participants were more likely to share their earnings with a fellow participant rather than steal from them. Given that these participants had no prior interaction, it is interesting to examine the trust between them. These prisoner's dilemma experiments highly relate to swift trust theory because in both instances trust is present almost immediately, despite the lack of prior interaction between the individuals.

== Components ==
Swift trust has both cognitive and normative (i.e., ideal or standard) components. The cognitive components of swift trust involve early trusting beliefs, while the normative components reinforce this trust. Meyerson et al. explain the normative components as providing "social proofs" and "fail-safe mechanisms" that can regulate trust and "avoid exaggerated confidence".

=== Cognitive components ===
The cognitive components of swift trust relate to collective perceptions of the group that are immediately apparent and are based on expectations related to social identities and self-categorizations. When individual group members are not able to rely on prior interactions with other team members, they rely on these social or self-categories to promote favorable in-group beliefs and actions that foster early trusting behavior. These early trusting beliefs tend to be self reinforcing in that individuals focus on information that validates their trusting beliefs while contrary evidence may go unnoticed.

=== Normative components ===
While cognitive components of swift trust are important for the start-up of the team, they may not be sufficient for maintaining trust, especially in the face of high uncertainty and in electronic contexts like virtual teams. Therefore, many believe that normative action components are necessary components in swift trust. According to Meyerson et al., swift trust erodes with "deviations from or violations of group norms and presumptions about competent...behavior" of the team (p. 190). Crisp and Jarvenpaa propose that the normative influence on swift trust may be much more important than originally theorized by Meyerson et al. Norms promote adaptive behavior by providing guidelines for what is considered acceptable in a group or team. Normative actions build on early trusting beliefs and help increase confidence in the team's abilities and can help the team overcome obstacles. By setting norms and mutually agreed upon standards, and acting in accordance, the team reinforces the social attraction to the group. Normative actions also promote positive attributions of other group member's behavior.

Normative and cognitive components interact in swift trust by working in conjunction with one another. Cognitive components continue to interrelate with normative actions, complementing one another, not replacing one another. For example, if teams have low early trusting beliefs, strong normative actions may be seen as controlling and inhibiting rather than coordinating and helpful.

Some researchers have noted that because many temporary teams are geographically separated or have members from different cultures and social systems, accepted norms could vary significantly. In fact, in a study by Postmes, Spears, and Lea, (2000), normative influences emerged over time, not through preconceived rules. In essence, interaction over time defined appropriate group behavior, not preconceived norms. While norms may provide a source for influencing behavior, it is the normative actions that provide the mechanisms for explaining the nature of normative influence.

== Swift trust in different work teams ==
Swift trust has been studied in a variety of work groups, like global virtual teams (GVT) and swift starting action teams (STATs). As of 2013, a contract-based, temporary workforce is becoming the norm rather than the exception. This shift is seen in many organizations' reliance on ad-hoc, non-traditional teams.

=== Swift trust in global virtual teams ===
A virtual team, as defined by Kristof et al. 1995, is "a self-managed knowledge work team, with distributed expertise, that forms and disbands to address a specific organizational goal." These teams generally have limited communication due to large time and space differences and rely largely on electronic communication. Swift trust is critical to virtual teams when there is limited or no time to build interpersonal relationships. Trust is based on an early assumption that the given team is trustworthy, but this assumption is verified through actions around the joint task, scheduling, and monitoring. Trust plays a critical role in organizational dynamics, especially within Global Virtual Teams (GVTs). In such teams, where members may be geographically dispersed and have diverse cultural backgrounds, trust becomes essential for fostering effective communication, collaboration, and overall team performance. Trust in GVTs is built on a foundation of transparent communication, empathy, consistency, inclusivity, accountability, and integrity. Effective leaders in GVTs embody these attributes and actively work to cultivate trust among team members, recognizing its critical importance in driving collaboration and achieving organizational success in a virtual environment.

=== Swift trust in swift starting action teams ===
Swift starting action teams (STATs) are highly independent teams composed of skilled individuals who work together to quickly and effectively complete a demanding, complex, time-pressured, and high-stakes project. These individuals have no prior experience with one another and must perform their task almost immediately upon formation. Traditional theories of trust formation do not adequately explain how trust forms in STATs, given that there is no prior experience with team members to establish trust and the team must work immediately. Like GVTs, researchers believe that STATs also utilize swift trust. Swift trust provides a basis for explaining how STATs are able to have trust within the team.

== Criticisms ==
Swift trust theory is not without its criticisms. Swift trust is fragile and cannot be sustained without subsequent communication. Jarvenpaa and Leidner note that it is necessary but not sufficient for the communication of trustworthiness. Additionally, some researchers have suggested that swift trust as theorized by Meyerson et al. is not a true form of trust, but rather a substitution of trust. It is suggested that swift trust is simply a risk management strategy. Furthermore, swift trust might inhibit actual trust building between the trustor and trustee.

== See also ==
- Industrial-organizational psychology
- Psychology portal
- Virtual team
