= Thomas J. Allen =

American organizational theorist (1931–2020)

Thomas J. Allen (1931–2020) was the Howard W. Johnson Professor of Management at the MIT Sloan School of Management, and the co-director of the MIT Leaders For Manufacturing program.

He was the creator of the Allen curve, an approach to measuring and modelling the performance of cross functional research and development teams. Allen died on November 13, 2020, aged 89.
