= Collaborative engineering =

Methods for enabling more effective Group Decision Support Systems (GDSS)

Collaborative engineering is defined by the International Journal of Collaborative Engineering as a discipline that "studies the interactive process of engineering collaboration, whereby multiple interested stakeholders resolve conflicts, bargain for individual or collective advantages, agree upon courses of action, and/or attempt to craft joint outcomes which serve their mutual interests."

Collaborative engineering is quickly becoming a topic of great interest in recent years due to the explosion of internet technologies. This upsurge is partially due to the success of projects such as Wikipedia and Linux that have proven the efficacy of internet collaboration.
