= Virtual manufacturing =

Computer simulations for manufacturing

Virtual Manufacturing (VM) is an integrated, computer-based environment that uses simulation and modeling technologies to optimize manufacturing processes, product design, and enterprise operations—with the goal of reducing costs, improving quality, and shortening time-to-market. Initially developed for machining operations, VM has expanded to areas such as casting, forging, sheet metalworking, and robotics.

VM employs tools such as discrete event simulation, finite element analysis (FEA), and 3D kinematics simulation to model and refine processes like CNC machining and robotic manufacturing. It also incorporates immersive technologies such as virtual reality (VR) and augmented reality (AR) to support operator training and system visualization.

In the context of Industry 4.0, VM is enhanced through integration with digital twins, Internet of Things (IoT), artificial intelligence (AI), big data analytics, and cloud computing—enabling real-time monitoring, predictive maintenance, and system-wide optimization. Digital twins allow near-real-time analysis of production systems, which can help reduce downtime and material waste.
