= Allen curve =

Graphical representation of human communication

In communication theory, the Allen curve is a graphical representation that reveals the exponential drop in frequency of communication between engineers as the distance between them increases. It was discovered by Massachusetts Institute of Technology Professor Thomas J. Allen in the late 1970s.

A related finding of Allen's was his identification of the key role of information gatekeepers. Often such interlocutors were poorly recognized by management and yet conveyed concepts from just the right people to just the right other people in the organization.

== Discovery ==
During the late 1970s, Allen undertook a project to determine how the distance between engineers’ offices affects the frequency of technical communication between them. The result of that research produced what is now known as the Allen Curve, revealing a strong negative correlation between physical distance and the frequency of communication between work stations. The finding also revealed the critical distance of 50 meters for weekly technical communication.

This finding was originally documented in Allen’s book, Managing the Flow of Technology.

== Recent development ==
With the fast advancement of internet and sharp drop of telecommunication cost, some wonder about the application of the Allen Curve in today's corporate environment. In 2007, Allen examined this question and the effects of frequency still holds true, citing a 1986 study of email and his own 1989 study of frequency of communication between "sites of a geographically dispersed computer manufacturer". He says

"For example, rather than finding that the probability of telephone communication increases with distance, as face-to-face probability decays, our data show a decay in the use of all communication media with distance (following a "near-field" rise)." [p. 58]

He further explains

"We do not keep separate sets of people, some of whom we communicate with by one medium and some by another. The more often we see someone face-to-face, the more likely it is that we will also telephone that person or communicate by another medium." [p. 58]

== Significance ==
With the wide acknowledgment of importance of communication to innovation, the Allen Curve is frequently taught and cited in management literature about innovation.

In the business world, this principle has had a very strong influence in many areas, such as commercial architecture designs (See for example the Decker Engineering Building in New York, the Steelcase Corporate Development Center in Michigan, the BMW Research Center in Munich, and the Volkswagen assembly and delivery center in Dresden), and project management.
