= Landmark (disambiguation) =

A landmark is a notable geographical feature or building.

Landmark, The Landmark, Landmark Building, or similar may also refer to:

== Places ==
- Landmark, Manitoba, Canada
- Landmark, Arkansas, United States
- Landmark, Missouri, United States

== Art, entertainment, and media ==
=== Books ===
- Landmark Ancient Histories
- Landmark Books (series)

=== Games ===
- Landmark (video game), a discontinued video game

=== Music ===
- Landmark (Asian Kung-Fu Generation album), 2012
- Landmarks (Clannad album), 1997
- Landmarks (Joe Lovano album), 1990
- Landmark (Salyu album), 2005
- Landmark (Hippo Campus album), 2017

=== Television ===
- Landmark (TV series), a Canadian current affairs television series
- "Landmarks" (How I Met Your Mother), a 2011 episode of the sitcom How I Met Your Mother
- The Landmark (album)

== Buildings ==
=== United Kingdom ===
- Landmark, Manchester, an approved office building in Manchester
- The Landmark London, a hotel in the City of Westminster, London
- The Landmark, a pair of skyscrapers at 22 Marsh Wall in Canary Wharf, London

=== United States ===
- The Landmark, also known as the Southern Pacific Building in San Francisco, California
- Landmark Center (Boston), a commercial building in Boston, Massachusetts
- Landmark (hotel and casino), Paradise, Nevada
- Landmark Office Towers Complex, a complex of three high-rises in Cleveland, Ohio
- Medical Arts Building (San Antonio), San Antonio, Texas, renamed to "Landmark Building" in the 1970s
- Landmark Mall, a mall in Alexandria, Virginia
- Landmark Building (Greenville, South Carolina), an office skyscraper in Greenville, South Carolina

=== Other places ===
- Landmark 81, a super-tall skyscraper in Ho Chi Minh City, Vietnam
- Keangnam Hanoi Landmark Tower, a skyscraper in Hanoi, Vietnam
- The Landmark (Abu Dhabi), a skyscraper in Abu Dhabi, United Arab Emirates
- The Landmark (Hong Kong), an office and shopping development in Hong Kong
- Yokohama Landmark Tower, skyscraper in Yokohama, Japan
- Landmark-Tower Bremen, a not so tall skyscraper of Justus Grosse in Überseestadt Bremen

== Organizations ==
- Landmark, an Australian agribusiness and wholly owned subsidiary of Agrium, Inc.
- Landmark (company), a serviced office provider in the UK
- Landmark (department store), a Philippine department store and supermarket chain
- Landmark Aviation, a company offering FBO services for aircraft
- Landmark Bookstores, an Indian bookstore chain
- Landmark Cinemas, a Canadian film exhibition chain
- Landmark College, a college in Putney, Vermont
- Landmark Conference an NCAA Division III athletic conference
- Landmark Global, an international division of the Belgian Post Group
- Landmark Group, an Emirati retail company
- Landmark Legal Foundation, an American conservative legal advocacy group.
- Landmark Media Enterprises, an American media company
- Landmark Theatre (disambiguation)
- Landmark Theatres, an American theatre chain
- Landmark Trust, a British charity that rescues and restores at-risk buildings
- Landmark Worldwide, or Landmark Education, a company offering self-development seminars, formerly known as Erhard Seminars Training (EST).
- Landmarks (University of Texas at Austin), a public art collection at the University of Texas at Austin
- Philadelphia Society for the Preservation of Landmarks, also known simply as Landmarks

== Other uses ==
- Anatomical landmark, in medicine
- Landmark decision, a legal ruling of great importance
- Landmark Forest Adventure Park, a theme park in Scotland, UK aimed at children
- Landmark point, a point in a shape that corresponds between similar shapes
- Landmarkism, or Landmark Baptists, a revivalist movement particularly popular among American Baptists
- Masonic Landmarks, a set of principles in Freemasonry

== See also ==
- Land survey marker
- National landmark (disambiguation), a site possessing nationally significant natural, historic, or scientific resources
