= 200 Aldersgate =

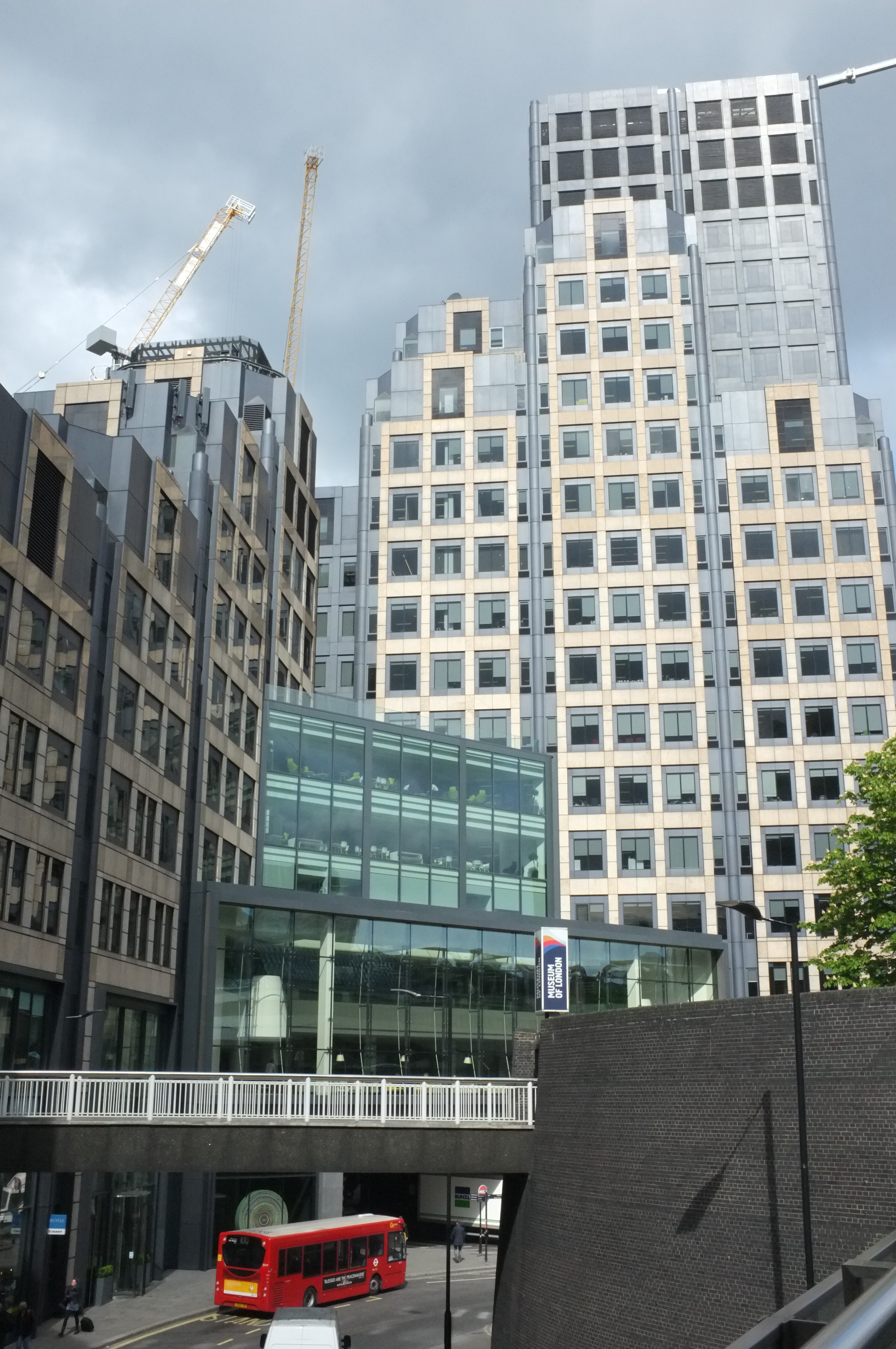
- 200 Aldersgate behind the Museum of London

- Location within City of London Location within Greater London

General information
- Status: Completed
- Location: London, England
- Coordinates: 51.5179°N 0.0975°W
- Completed: 1992
- Renovated: 2010
- Owner: AshbyCapital

Website
- www.my200aldersgate.com

200 Aldersgate is a 434,005 sq ft office building in the City of London.

Proposed in 1983, designed by the architects Fitzroy Robinson & Partners, and built in 1991–92, the building was the headquarters of legal firm Clifford Chance before it moved to Canary Wharf. It was extensively redeveloped by Helical Bar in 2010, in conjunction with architects Morey Smith. The refurbishment included two large new reception and lobby areas, a cycle store for 220 bicycles with shower and changing facilities and, on the first floor, a new business lounge and café linking the two parts of the building.

In 2013, 200 Aldersgate was purchased by AshbyCapital, a real estate investment advisory firm, which sold the property to Samsung SRA in 2018.

200 Aldersgate is recognisable by the neon artworks in its front windows. Measuring 2.5m in diameter, 'Revolution – in two parts' by Rob and Nick Carter, was commissioned by 200 Aldersgate in 2010.

200 Aldersgate is also known as one of three landmarks forming Stand Up To Cancer's London 3 Peaks Challenge. In 2014, 400 participants in the first ever challenge scaled The Gherkin and Heron Tower, before abseiling 56 metres down the outside of 200 Aldersgate.

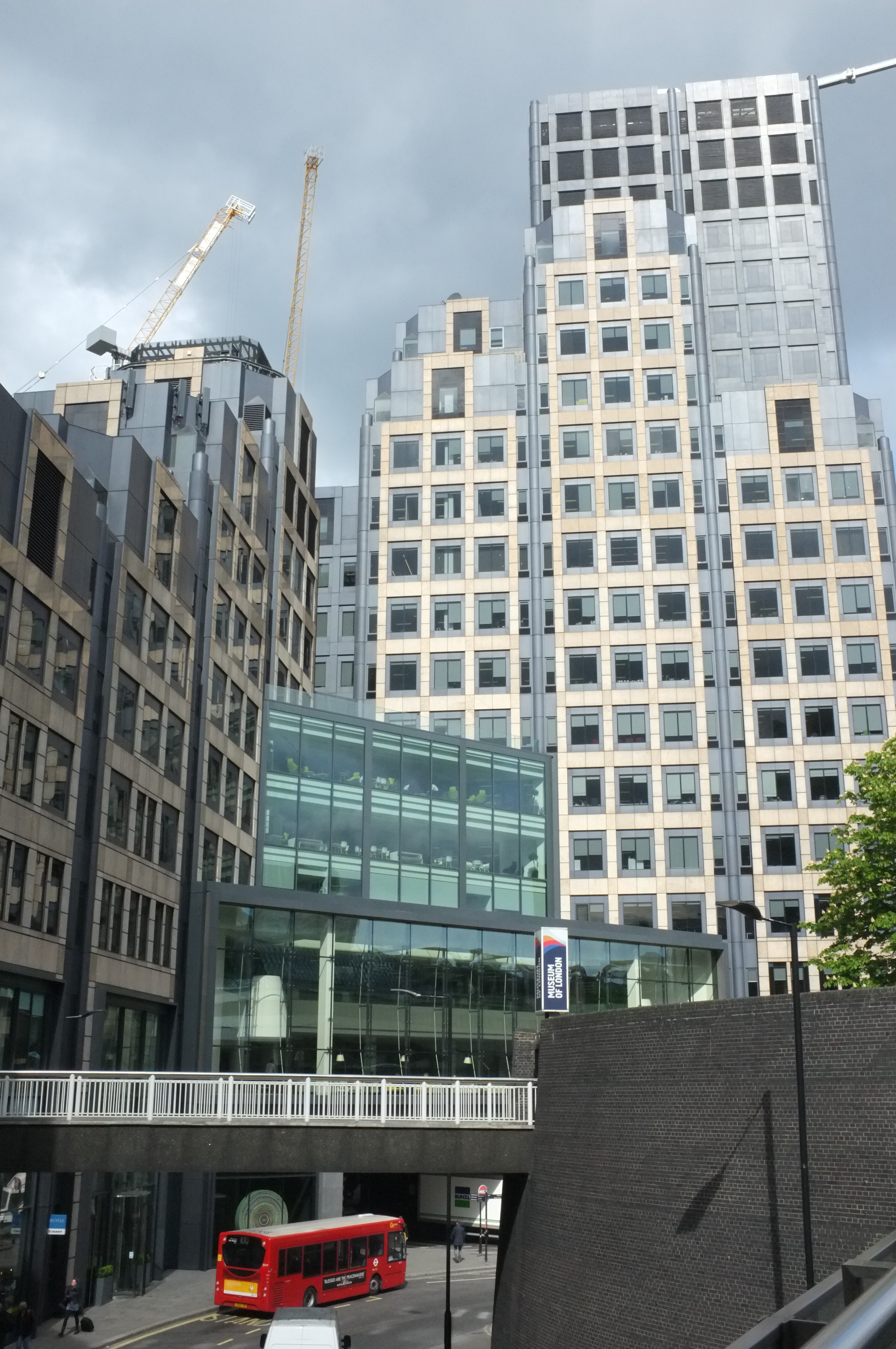
200 Aldersgate

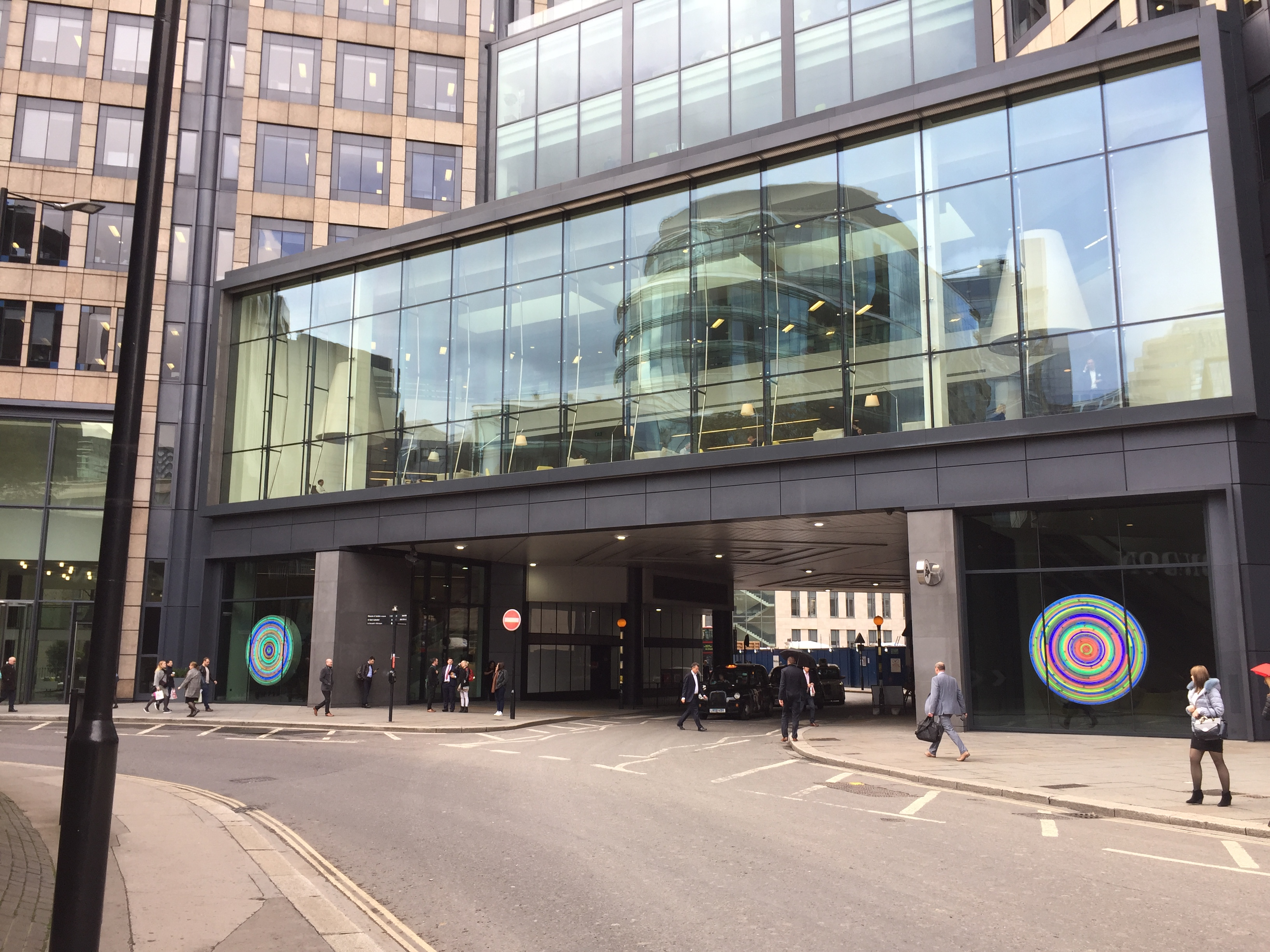
'Revolution – in two parts'

== Major tenants ==
- Oxera Consulting LLP
- FTI Consulting
- Agence France-Presse
- Pret a Manger
- Virgin Active
- Rail Delivery Group
- Citizens Advice
