= Sushisamba =

American sushi restaurant chain

SUSHISAMBA
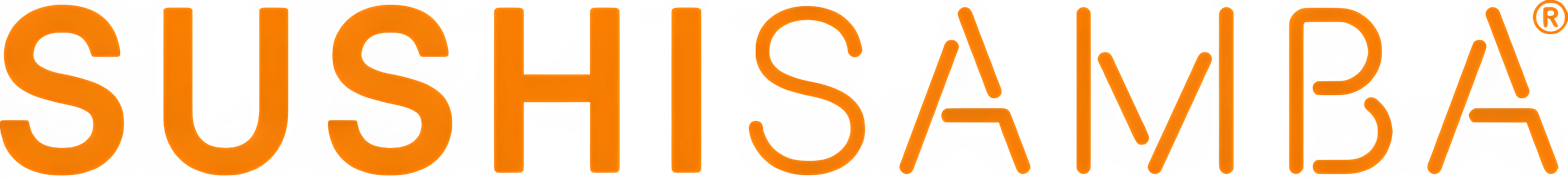

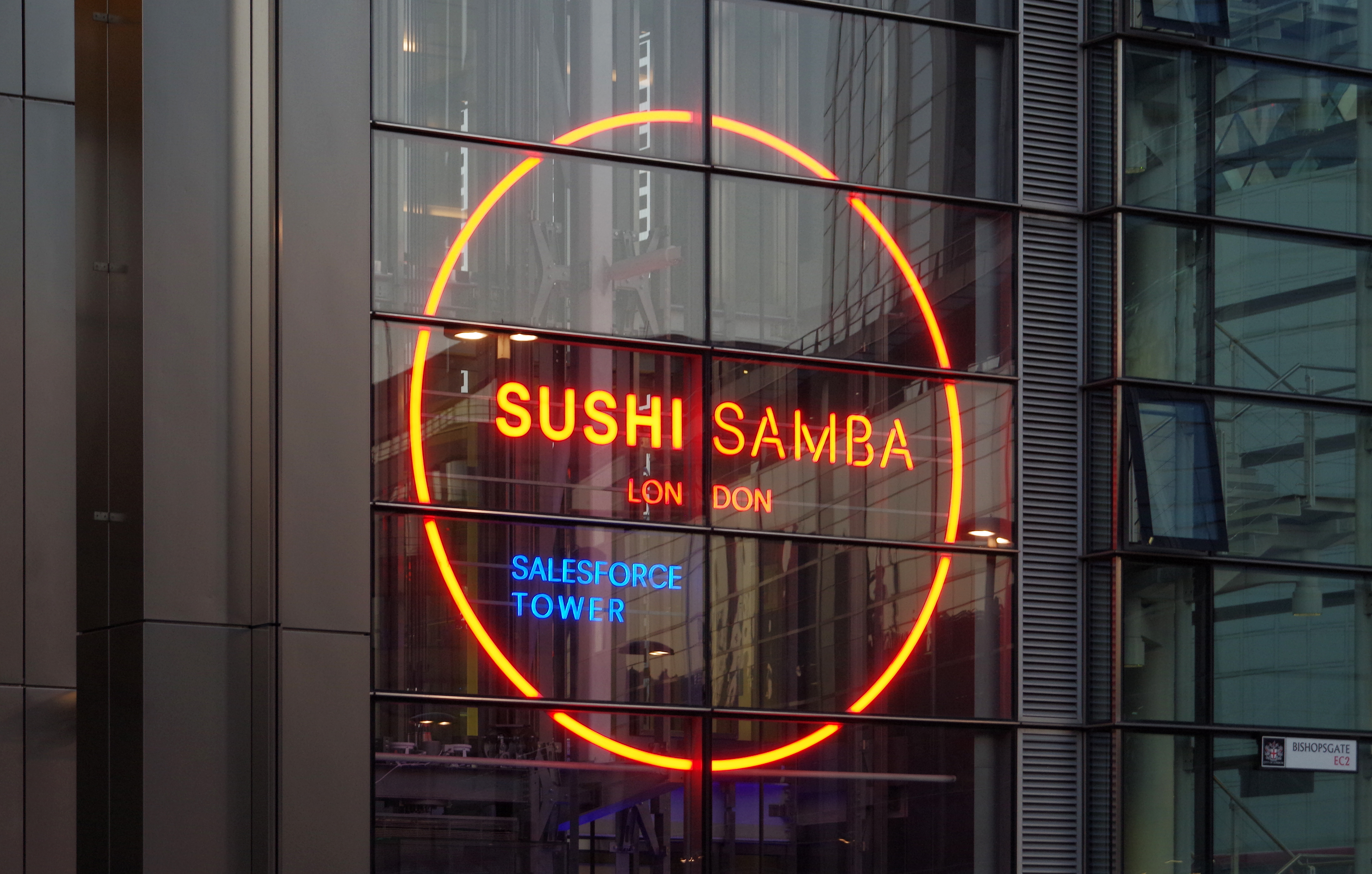
- Exterior of Sushisamba in Heron Tower, London, England

Restaurant information
- Established: 1999
- Owner: Shamal Holding
- Food type: Sushi, Japanese, Peruvian, Brazilian
- Location: Bahrain, England, Saudi Arabia, Scotland, Singapore, Qatar, United Arab Emirates, United States
- Website: sushisamba.com

Sushisamba (stylized as SUSHISAMBA, SushiSamba, or Sushi Samba) is an American sushi restaurant chain. Its cuisine is a blend between Peruvian, Japanese, and Brazilian. There are eleven locations and the chain's restaurants have won many awards.

== History ==
Sushisamba was founded in 1999 in New York City by Shimon Bokovza, an Israeli entrepreneur. There are 11 locations across 3 continents and 8 countries. It was inspired by the food of Japanese workers who came to South America to cultivate coffee plantations. Its name comes from the combining of the words "sushi" and "samba", a Brazilian musical genre.

It was independently owned by the Sushisamba Group from 1999 to 2023 before being acquired by Shamal Holding, a Dubai-based investment firm.

== Locations ==
- Covent Garden, London, England
- Heron Tower, London, England
- Edinburgh, Scotland
- New York City, United States (closed)
- Miami Beach, United States (closed)
- Las Vegas, United States
- Los Angeles, United States (coming soon)
- Dubai, United Arab Emirates
- Abu Dhabi, United Arab Emirates
- Doha, Qatar
- Manama, Bahrain
- Singapore
- Riyadh, Saudi Arabia
- Milan, Italy (coming soon)

== Gallery ==
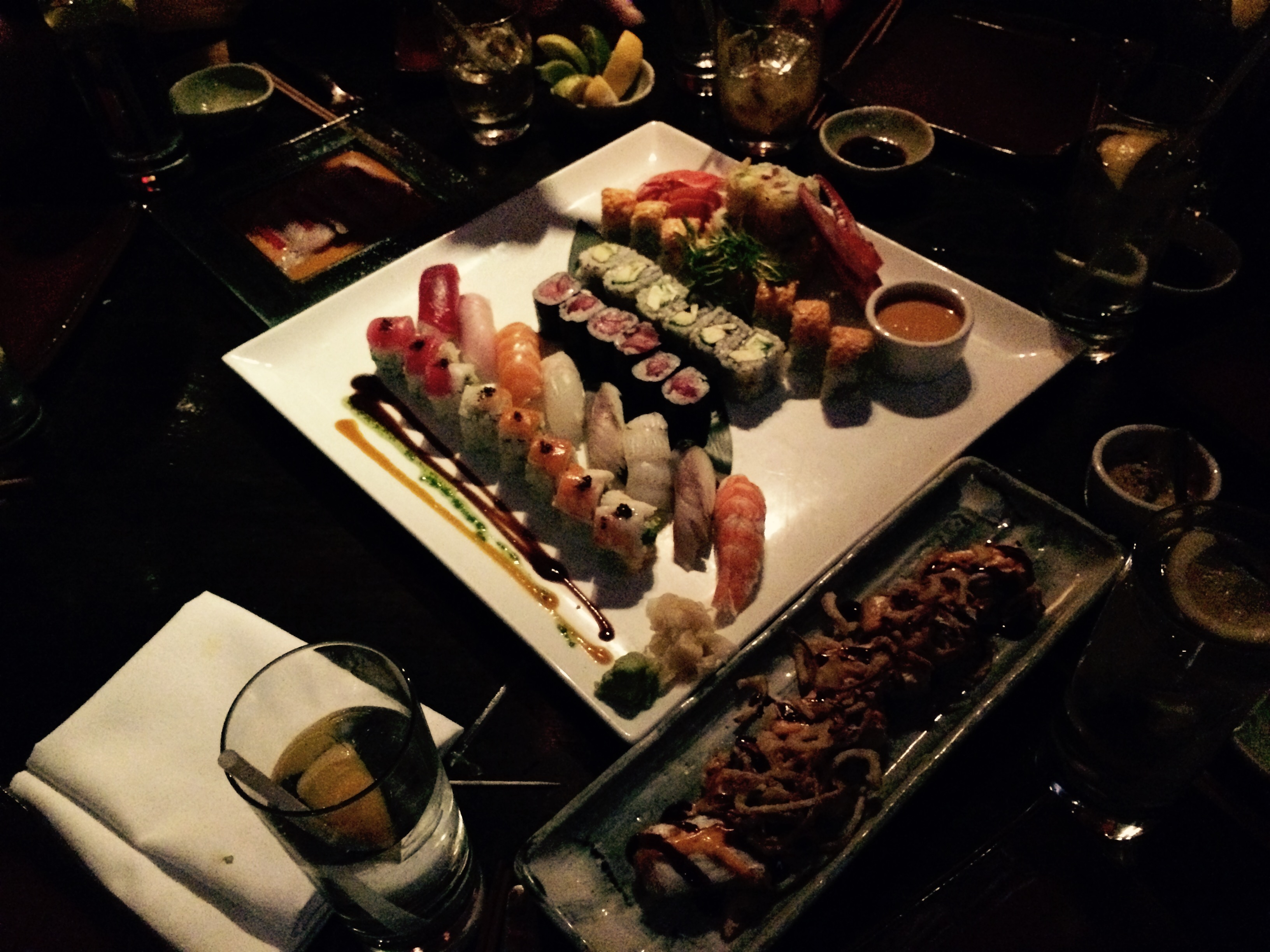
Sushisamba at the Palazzo in Las Vegas

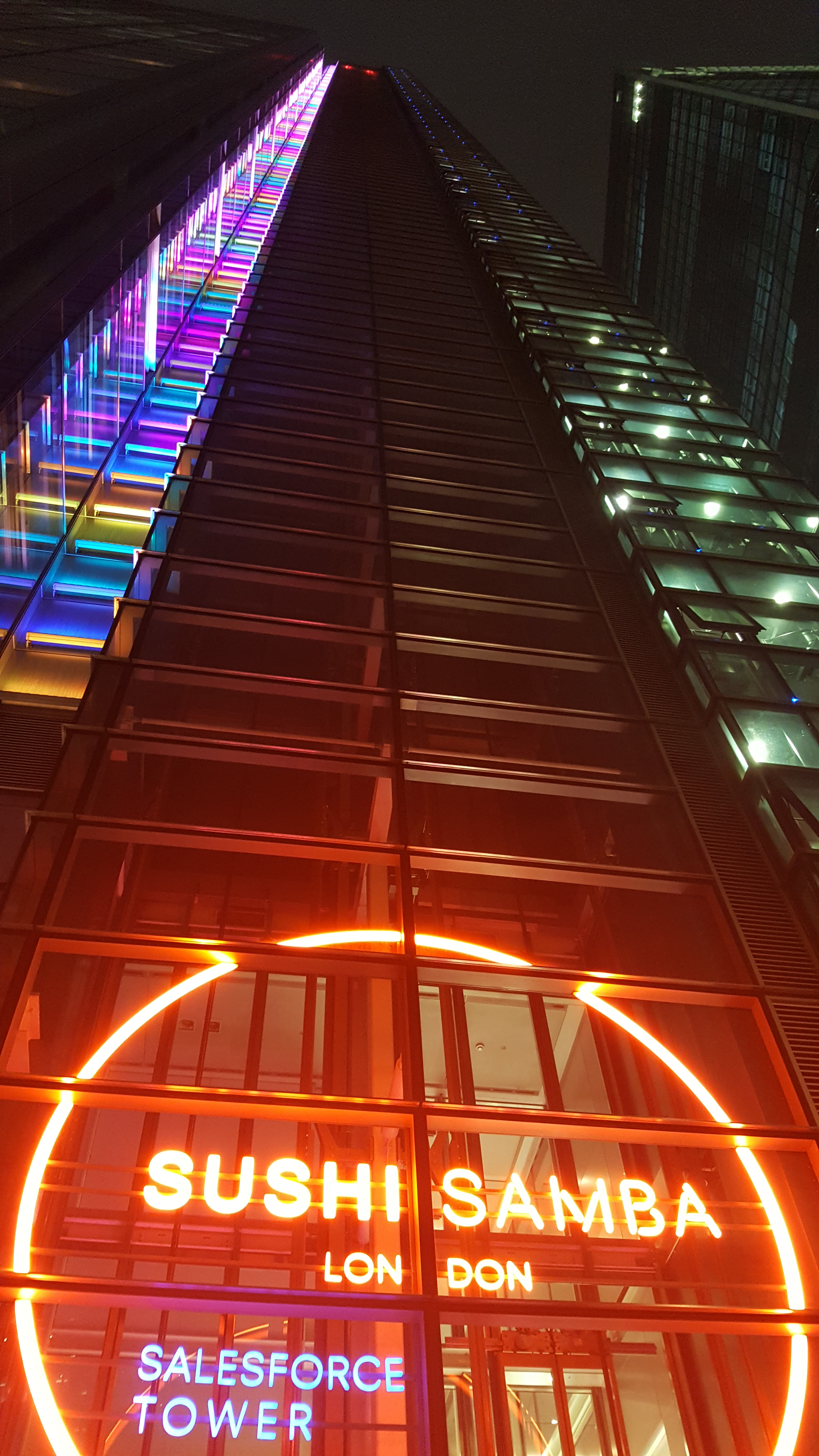
Heron Tower in London, England, the restaurant is on the top floors

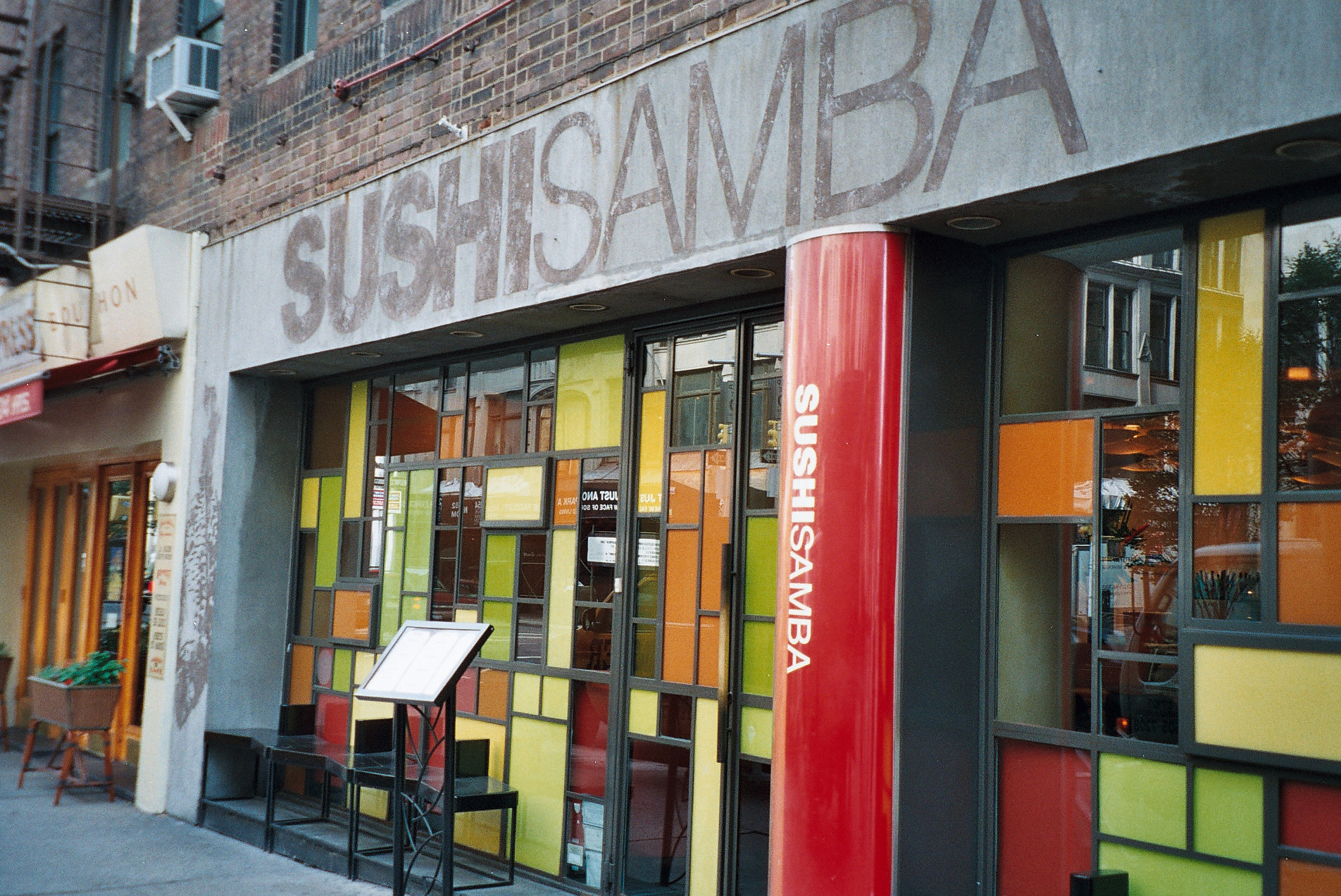
The former original location in New York City along Park Avenue South

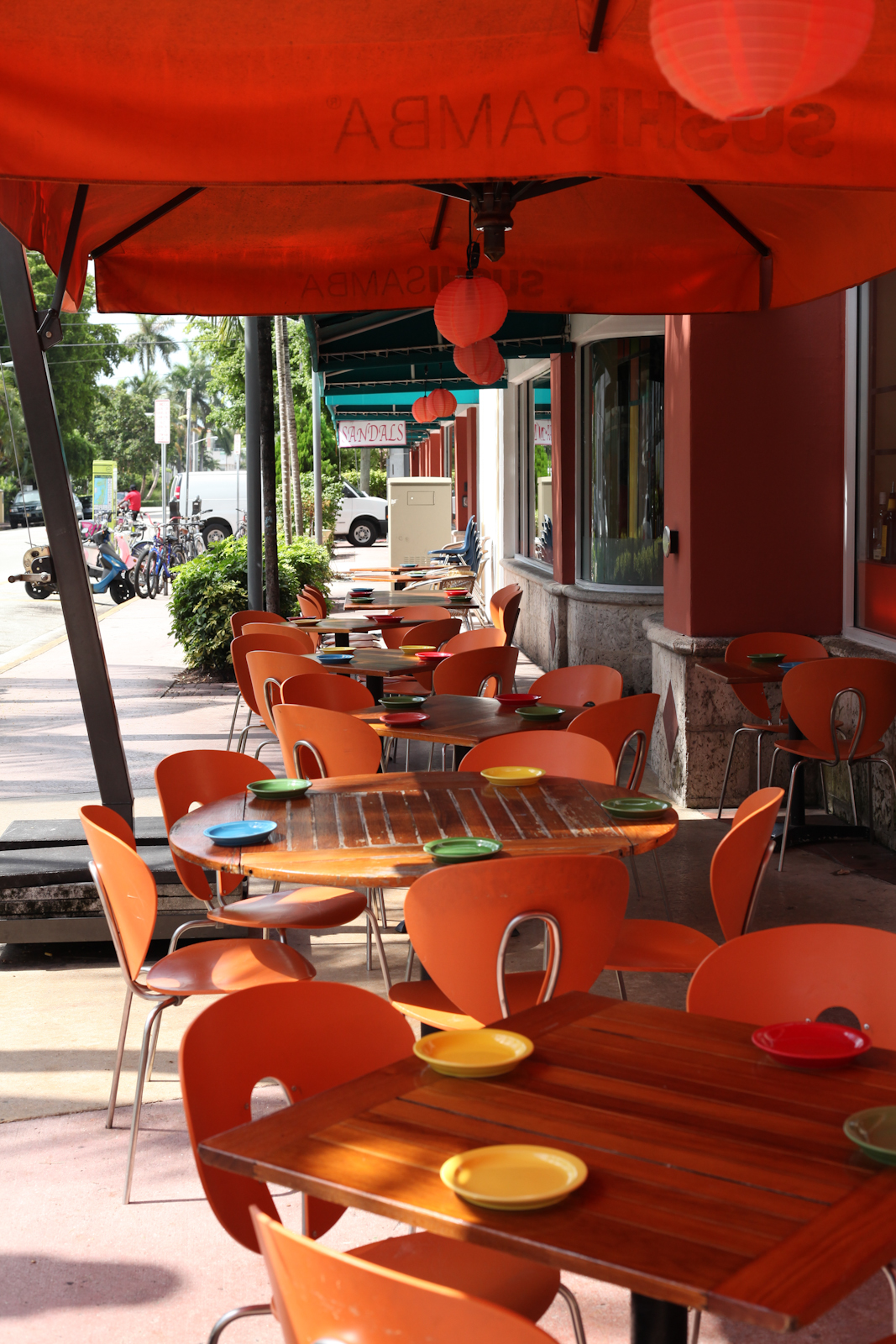
Former location at the Lincoln Road Mall in Miami Beach

== See also ==
- List of sushi restaurants
