= Landmark (company) =

British serviced office provider

- Type: Limited company
- Industry: Serviced Offices & Office Space Provider
- Founded: 2000, London, United Kingdom
- Headquarters: Royal Exchange, London
- Products: Serviced Offices, Virtual Offices, Coworking, Business Lounges, Meeting Rooms, Professional Event Space
- Website: www.landmarkspace.co.uk

Landmark is a serviced office provider based in London. As of April 2021, it operates 40 serviced offices in nine cities.

== History ==
Landmark was established in February 2000 to provide serviced offices to corporate firms in central London. Initially focusing on City of London buildings, it expanded into the West End of London in 2013, an area reported by Jones Lang LaSalle to have limited high-end office space.

In January 2018, Landmark merged with office space provider i2 Office.

Landmark provides private offices, virtual offices, meeting rooms and Club Space membership, also known as coworking.

== Buildings ==
Landmark currently provides office space in 40 buildings:

- 3 Brindleyplace, B1
- 2 Snow Hill, B4
- One Temple Quay, BS1
- 40 Bank Street, E14
- 200 Aldersgate, EC1
- 99 Bishopsgate, EC2
- 110 Bishopsgate, EC2
- 60 Gresham Street, EC2
- 125 Old Broad Street, EC2
- 6 Bevis Marks, EC3
- 54 Fenchurch Street, EC3
- 40 Gracechurch Street, EC3
- Holland House, Bury Street, EC3
- Royal Exchange, EC3
- 15 St Botolph Street, EC3
- St Magnus House, EC3
- Cannon Place, Cannon Street, EC4
- 75 King William Street, EC4
- Exchange Place 2, EH3
- 2 West Regent Street, G2
- No 1 Leeds, Whitehall Road, LS12
- Chancery Place, Brown Street, M2
- 3 Hardman Square, M3
- Luminous House, 300 South Row, MK9
- The Pinnacle, Midsummer Boulevard, MK9
- Euston House, Eversholt Street, NW1
- 450 Brook Drive, RG2
- 6 Mitre Passage, SE10
- 105 Victoria Street, SW1
- 120 New Cavendish Street, W1W
- 15 Alfred Place, WC1E
- 40 Bernard Street, Russell Square, WC1
- 33 Cavendish Square, W1
- 4 Devonshire Street, W1
- 48 Dover Street, W1
- 11-14 Grafton Street, W1
- 30 Newman Street, W1
- Portman House, 2 Portman Street, W1
- 81 Chancery Lane, WC2
