= Landmark (TV program) =

- Genre: Current affairs
- Written by: George Salverson
- Presented by: John Kettle
- Country of origin: Canada
- Original language: English
- No. of seasons: 1
- No. of episodes: 8

Production
- Executive producer: Doug Wilkinson
- Producer: Julian Smither
- Running time: 30 minutes

Original release
- Network: CBC Television
- Release: 4 January – 22 February 1970

Landmark is a Canadian current affairs television program that aired on CBC Television in 1970.

== Premise ==
John Kettle hosted this program concerning the natural resources industry in Canada, especially how those resources were developed with foreign financing. Segments were recorded in various Canadian and American cities and featured discussion with industry consultants.

== Scheduling ==
This half-hour program was broadcast Sundays at 1:00 p.m. (Eastern) from 4 January to 22 February 1970.
