= Landmark, Missouri =

Extinct town in the American state of Missouri

Coordinates: 39.1130925°N 92.5171260°W

Landmark is an extinct town in Howard County, in the U.S. state of Missouri.

A post office called Landmark was in operation from 1856 until 1915. The community was named for an individual tree which stood as a landmark at the original town site.
