= National landmark =

A National landmark may refer to:

== Canada ==
- National Landmarks (Canada)

== Saint Lucia ==
- National Landmark, a type of protected area managed by the Saint Lucia National Trust

== United States ==
- National Historic Landmark
- National Natural Landmark
- National Landmark of Soaring, a designation for people, places and events significant in the history of gliders and motorless aviation

== See also ==
- Landmark
- List of heritage registers
- Kulturdenkmal
