= Landmark =

Recognizable feature used for navigation

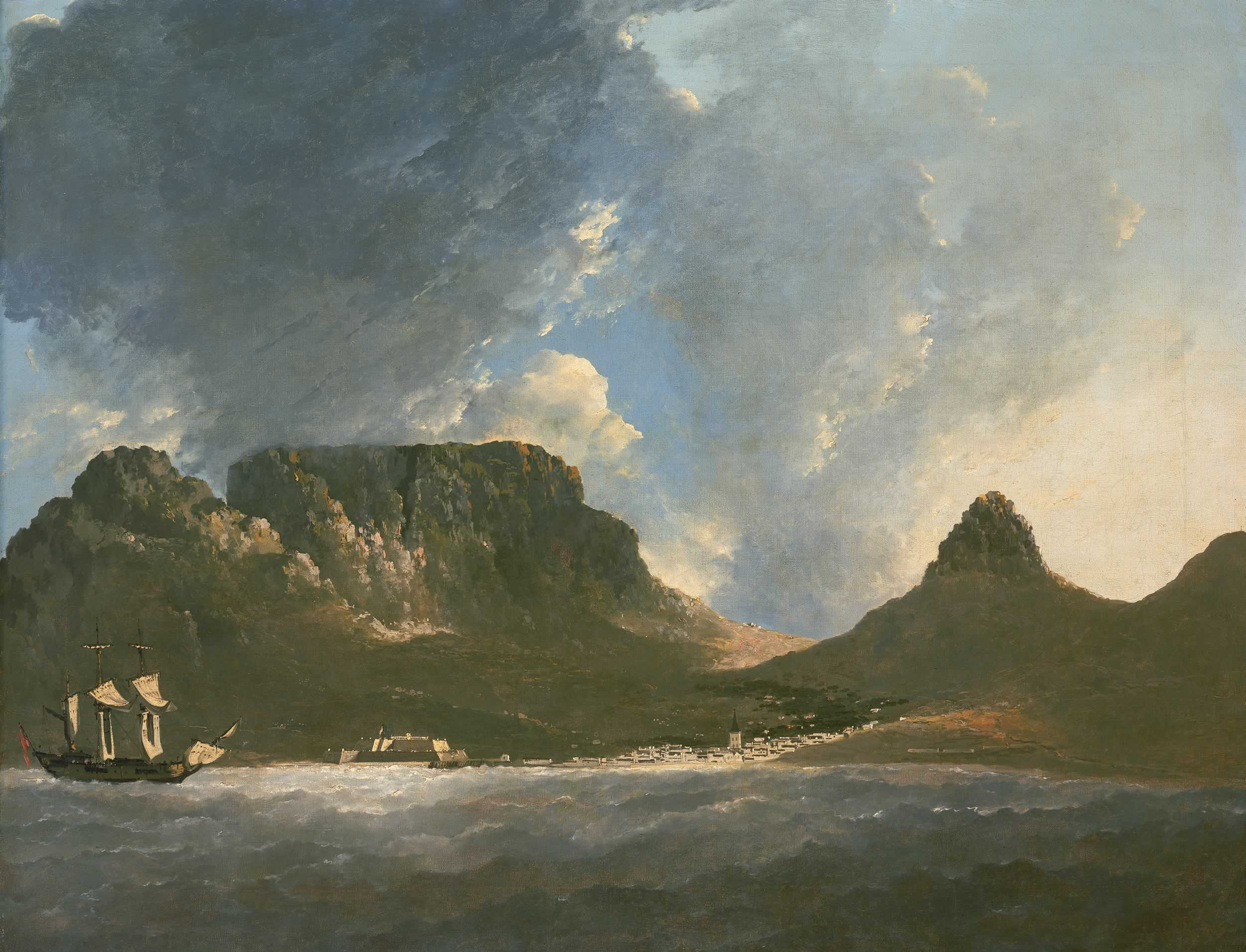
An 18th-century painting of a ship with Table Mountain in the background, used by navigators as the landmark to sail around southern tip of Africa.

A landmark is a recognizable natural or artificial feature used for navigation, a feature that stands out from its near environment and is often visible from long distances.

In modern-day use, the term can also be applied to smaller structures or features that have become local or national symbols.

== Etymology ==
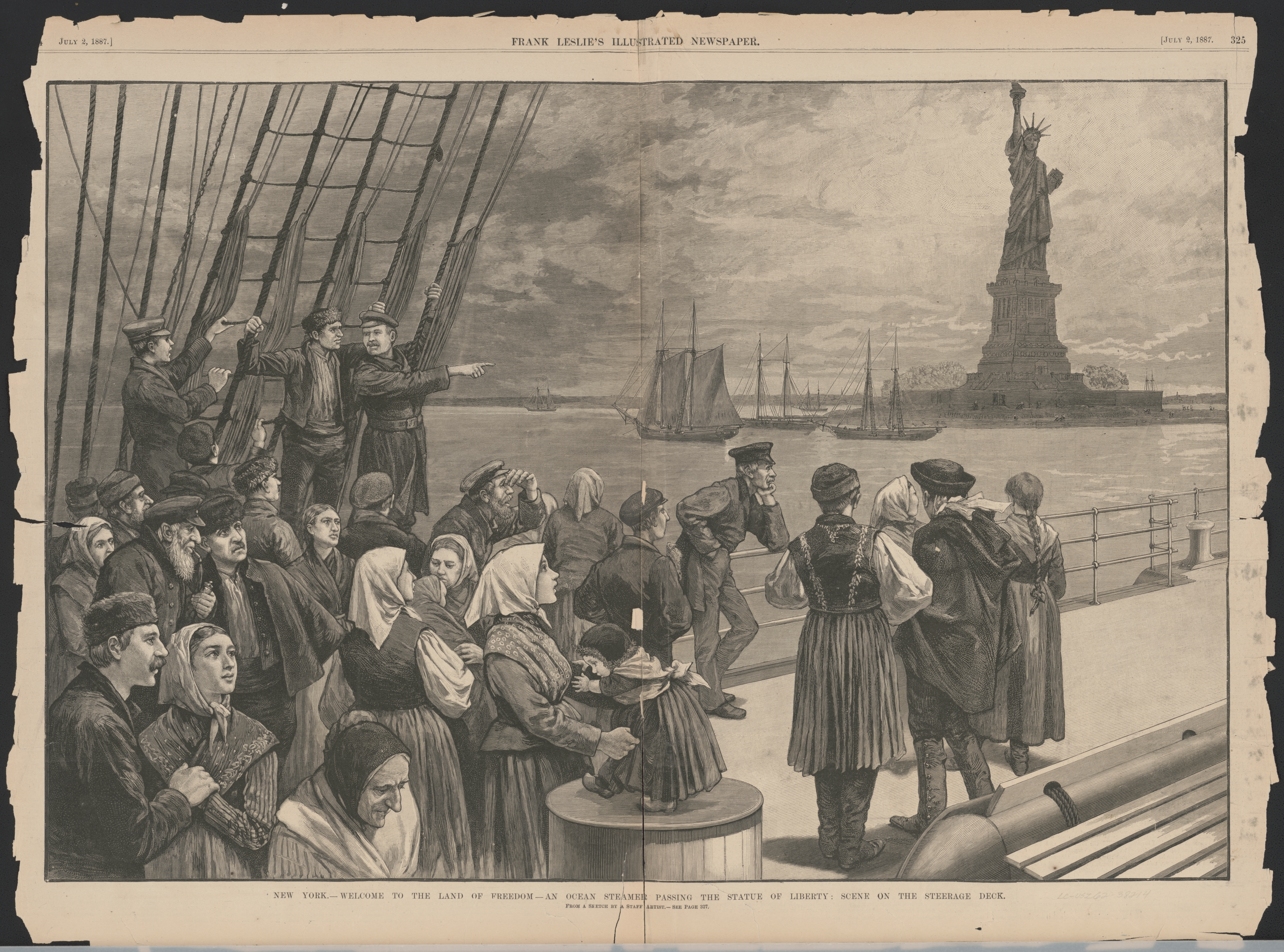
The Statue of Liberty (formally Liberty Enlightening the World), a famous landmark of New York City and the United States, greets newly arrived immigrants and is located near Ellis Island, where millions of immigrants first touched U.S. soil.

In Old English, the word landmearc (from land + mearc (mark)) was used to describe a boundary marker, an "object set up to mark the boundaries of a kingdom, estate, etc." Starting around 1560, this interpretation of "landmark" was replaced by a more general one. A landmark became a "conspicuous object in a landscape".

A landmark literally meant a geographic feature used by explorers and others to find their way back to their departure point, or through an area. For example, Table Mountain near Cape Town, South Africa, was used as a landmark to help sailors navigate around the southern tip of Africa during the Age of Exploration. Artificial structures are also sometimes built to assist sailors in navigation. The Lighthouse of Alexandria and the Colossus of Rhodes are ancient structures built to lead ships to the port. In modern usage, a landmark includes anything that is easily recognizable, such as a monument, building, or other structure. In American English it is the main term used to designate places that might be of interest to tourists, due to notable physical features or historical significance. Landmarks in the British English sense are often used for casual navigation, such as giving directions. This is done in American English as well.

In urban studies as well as in geography, a landmark is furthermore defined as an external point of reference that helps orientation in a familiar or unfamiliar environment. Landmarks are often used in verbal route instructions ("Turn left at the big church and then right over the bridge.")

== Types ==
Landmarks are usually classified as either natural landmarks or human-made landmarks, both are originally used to support navigation on finding directions. A variant is a seamark or daymark, a structure usually built intentionally to aid sailors navigating featureless coasts.

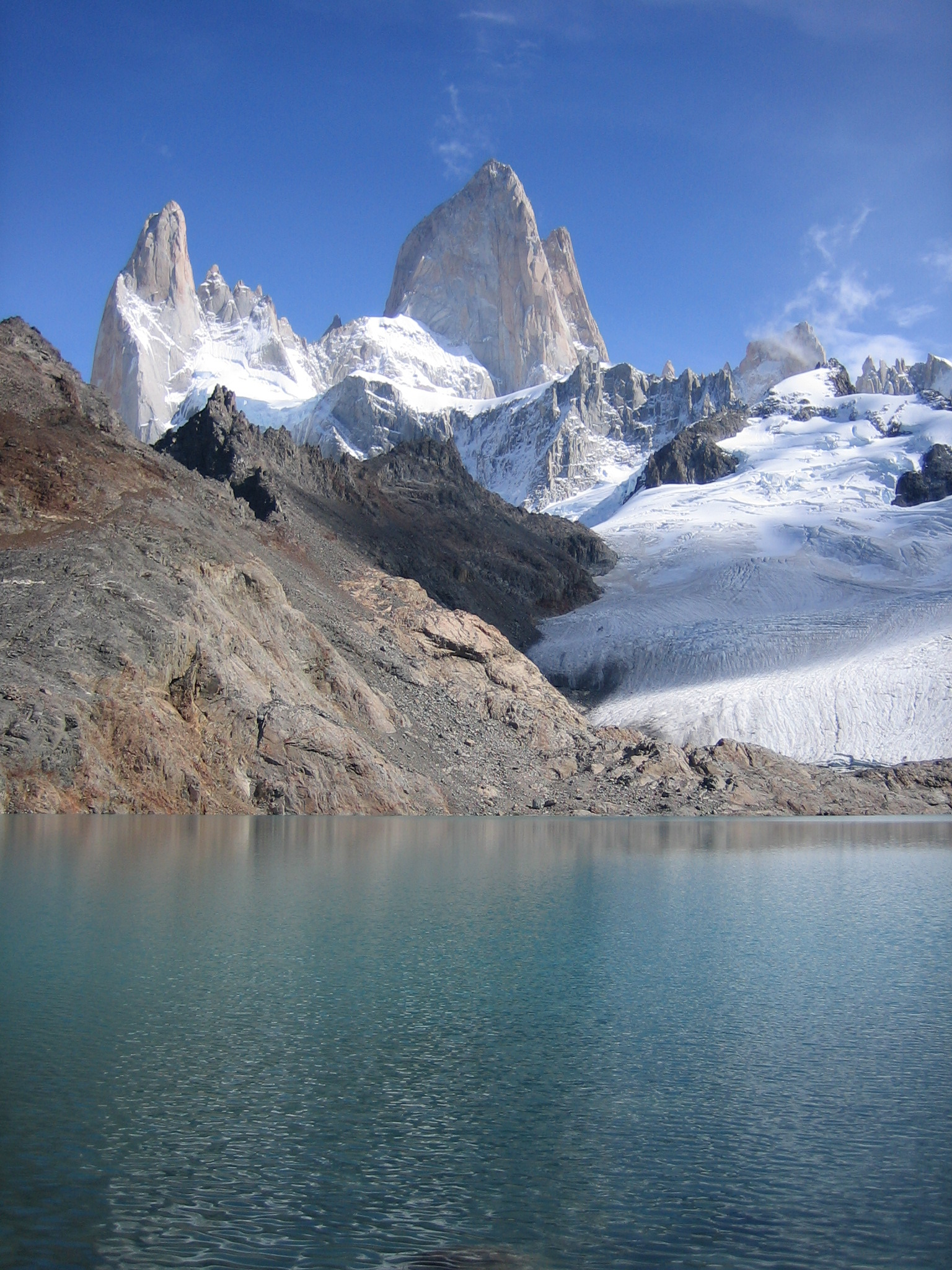
Mount Fitz Roy in Argentina

=== Natural ===
Natural landmarks can be characteristic features, such as mountains or plateaus. Examples of natural landmarks are Mount Everest in the Himalayas, Table Mountain in South Africa, Mount Ararat in Turkey, Uluru in Australia, Mount Fuji in Japan and the Grand Canyon in the United States. Trees might also serve as local landmarks, such as jubilee oaks or conifers. Some landmark trees may be named, such as Queen's Oak, Hanging Oak and Centennial Tree.

Bases of fallen trees, known in this context as rootstocks, are used as navigational aids on high-resolution maps and in the sport of orienteering. Because most woods have many fallen trees, generally only very large rootstocks are mapped.

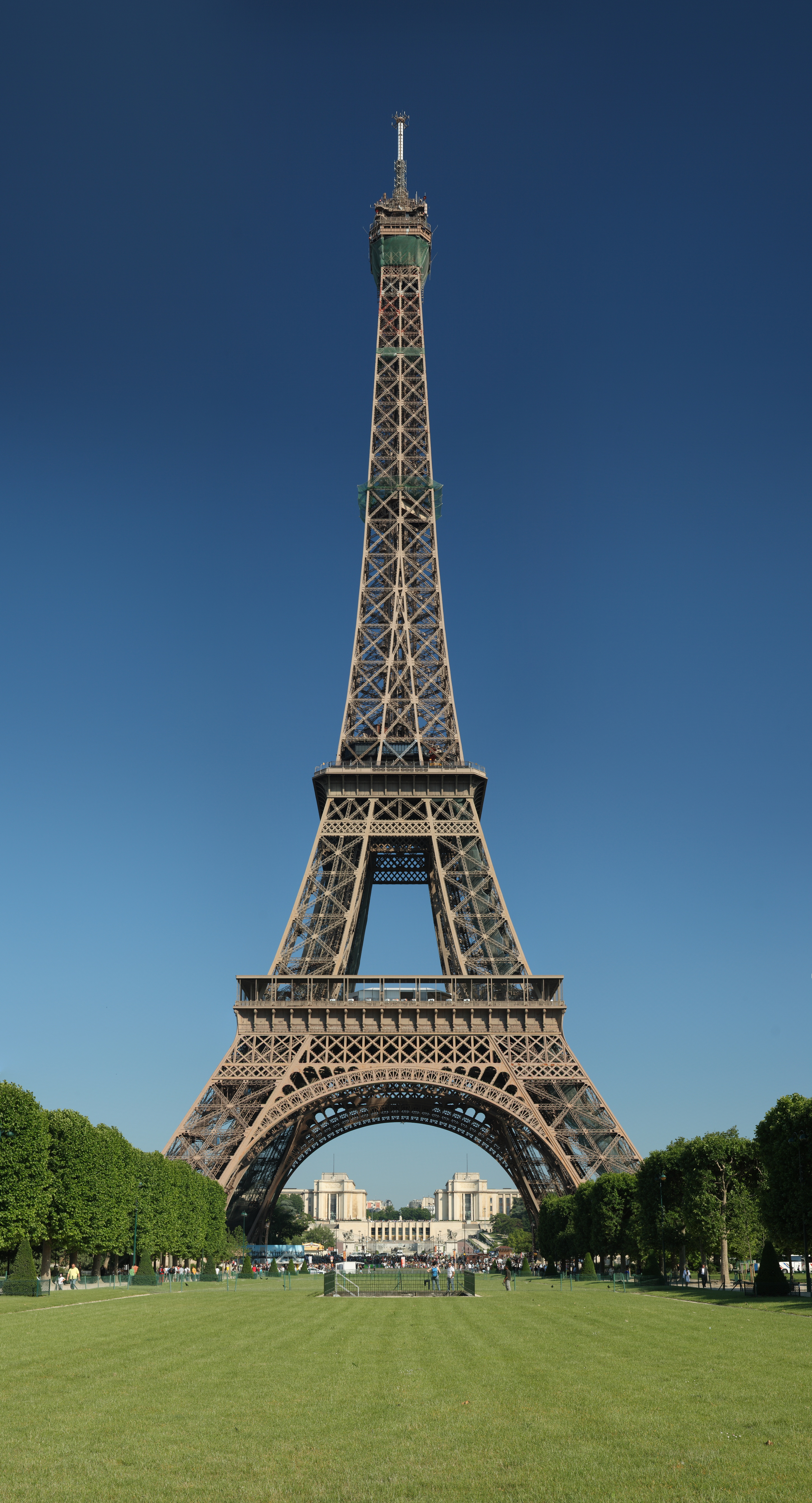
The Eiffel Tower – tallest in the world from 1889 to 1930 and a famous Paris landmark

=== Human made ===
In the modern sense, landmarks are usually referred to as monuments or prominent distinctive buildings, used as the symbol of a certain area, city, or nation. Examples include:

- Tokyo Tower in Tokyo
- the White House in Washington, D.C.
- the Statue of Liberty and Empire State Building in New York City
- the Eiffel Tower in Paris
- Saint Basil's Cathedral in Moscow
- the Lotte World Tower in Seoul
- the Colosseum in Rome
- the Umayyad Mosque in Damascus
- Big Ben in London
- the Tsūtenkaku in Osaka
- the Forbidden City in Beijing
- the Great Pyramid in Giza
- Christ the Redeemer in Rio de Janeiro
- Statue of Unity in Narmada
- Bratislava Castle in Bratislava
- Helsinki Cathedral in Helsinki
- the Space Needle in Seattle
- the Marina Bay Sands in Singapore
- the Sydney Opera House in Sydney
- the Brandenburg Gate in Berlin
- the Prophet's Mosque in Medina
- the Château Frontenac in Quebec (city)
- Place Stanislas in Nancy
- the CN Tower in Toronto
- the Palace of Culture and Science in Warsaw
- the Atomium in Brussels
- Gateway Arch in St Louis
- the Moai of Easter Island
- the Great Mosque of Samarra in Samarra

Church spires and mosque minarets are often very tall and visible from many miles around and thus often serve as built landmarks. Also town hall towers and belfries often have a landmark character.

== See also ==
- Boundary marker – Physical marker that identifies a land boundary
- Contemporary history – Era from 1945–present
- Cultural heritage management – Vocation and practice of managing cultural heritage
- Daymark – Daytime aid to navigation
- Heritage tourism – Tourism based on cultural heritage sites
- National landmark (disambiguation)
- National symbol – Symbol of a national community
