= Landmark Theatre =

Landmark Theatre may refer to:

- Landmark Theatre, Devon, in North Devon, England
- Landmark Theatre (Syracuse, New York), USA
- Altria Theater, formerly the Landmark Theater in Richmond Virginia, USA

== See also ==
- Landmark Theatres, American chain of movie theaters
- Landmark Theater (Richmond, Virginia), now the Altria Theater
