= Heron Tower =

Skyscraper in the City of London, England

Coordinates: 51°30′58″N 0°4′51″W

110 Bishopsgate
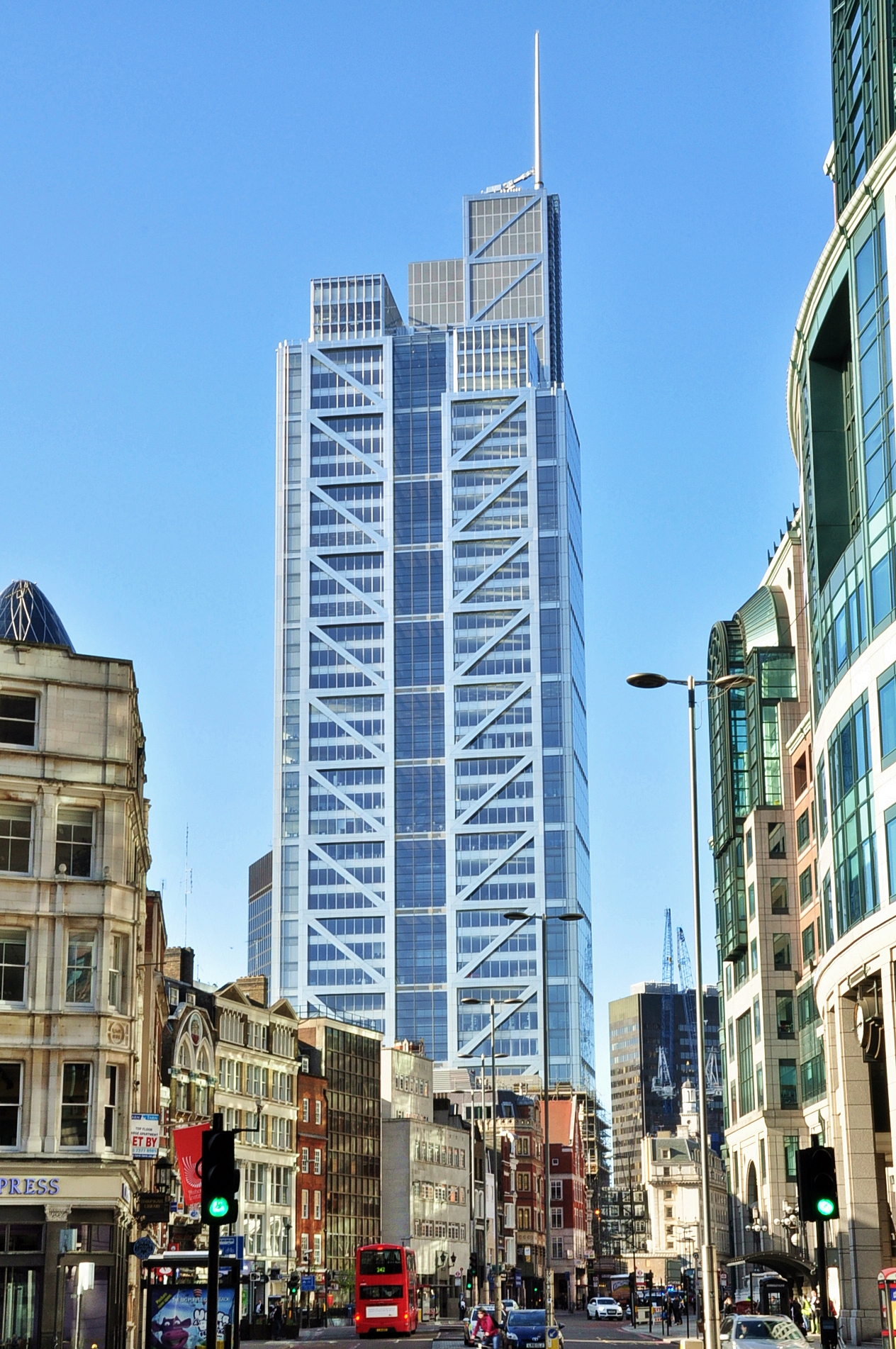
- Interactive map of the 110 Bishopsgate area

General information
- Status: Completed
- Type: Commercial
- Location: London, EC2; United Kingdom
- Construction started: 2007
- Completed: 2011

Height
- Antenna spire: 230 metres (755 ft)
- Roof: 202 metres (663 ft)

Dimensions
- Other dimensions: 2,400-square-metre (26,000 sq ft) site

Technical details
- Floor count: 46
- Floor area: 461,478 sq ft (43,000 m^{2})

Design and construction
- Architect: Kohn Pedersen Fox
- Structural engineer: Arup
- Main contractor: Skanska

Website
- http://110bishopsgate.com/

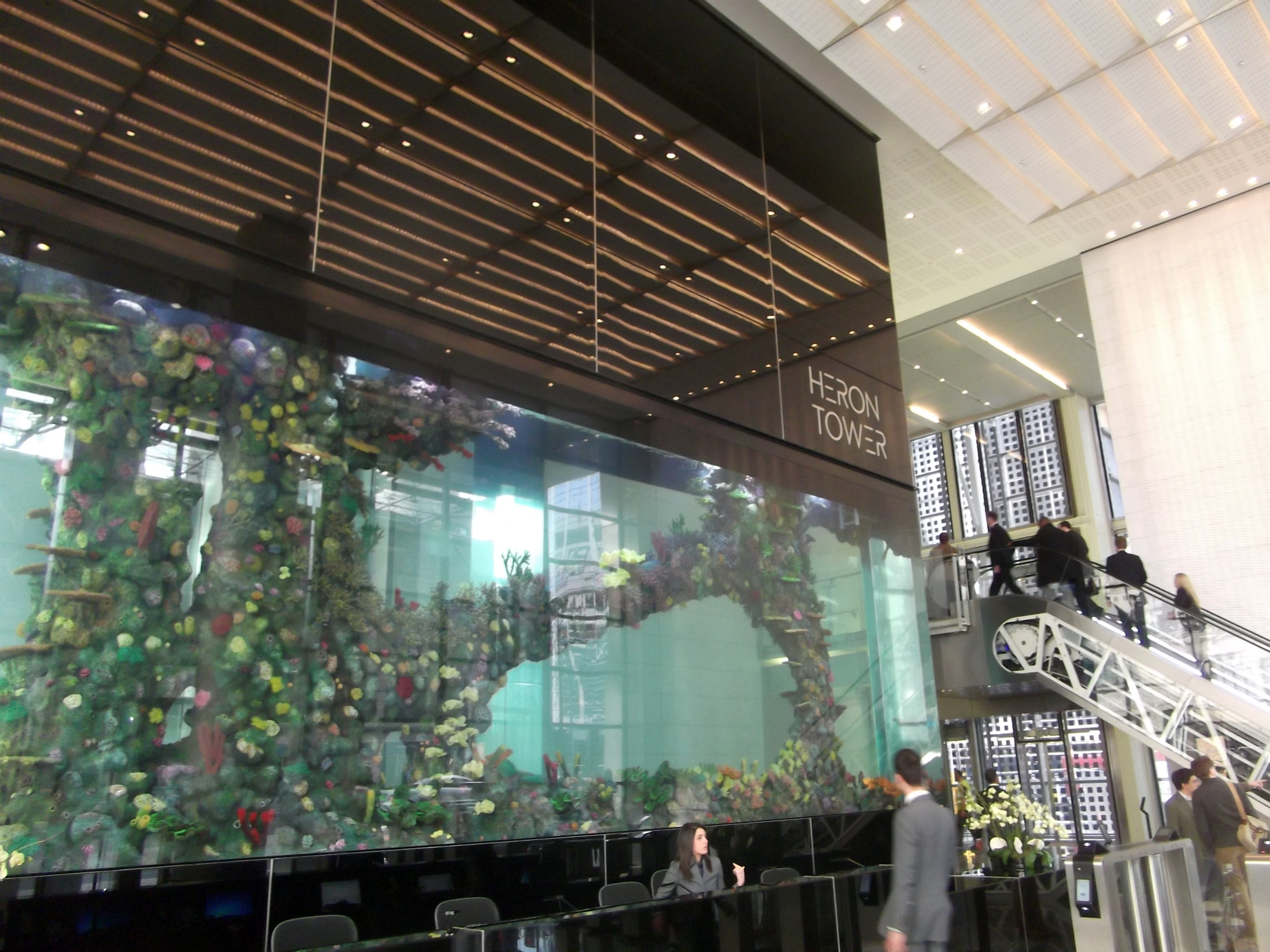
The lobby features a 70,000-litre aquarium containing hundreds of fish.

Heron Tower (formally 110 Bishopsgate, and informally known as Salesforce Tower) is a commercial skyscraper in London. It stands 230 metres (755 ft) tall including its 28-metre (92 ft) mast making it the second tallest building in the City of London financial district and the fifth tallest in Greater London and the United Kingdom, after the Shard in Southwark, 22 Bishopsgate, One Canada Square and Landmark Pinnacle both at Canary Wharf. 110 Bishopsgate is located on Bishopsgate and is bordered by Camomile Street, Outwich Street and Houndsditch.

Construction of the building started in 2007 and was completed in 2011. It is owned by Heron International and is still popularly known as Heron Tower, though following a naming dispute in 2014 involving the tenant Salesforce.com the City of London planning committee made it clear they would rule in favour of the property being officially named 110 Bishopsgate, although the application was withdrawn before it went to committee. The tower initially struggled to attract tenants in the depths of the Great Recession, but is now fully let.

== Design and planning ==
Designed by architects Kohn Pedersen Fox, 110 Bishopsgate was initially planned to reach a height of 183 metres (600 ft), the same as the NatWest Tower (officially Tower 42), which had been the tallest building in the City of London since 1977.

It attracted some controversy when first announced due to its proximity to St Paul's Cathedral when viewed from Waterloo Bridge. English Heritage was notably vocal in expressing concerns. A public inquiry was subsequently held, the outcome of which was decided by deputy prime minister John Prescott, who ruled in the developers' favour. The tower was given final approval for construction in July 2002.

Three years later, the project had yet to begin construction. In September 2005 the Heron Property Corporation submitted a planning application to increase the height of its approved building. Heron's revised plans now proposed a 202-metre (663 ft) tall tower topped by a 28-metre (92 ft) mast, giving it a total height of 230 metres (755 ft). Although the design was largely identical to the previous scheme, the tower's crown and southern façades were refined. In January 2006, the revised project was approved by the City of London Corporation.

In February 2013, it was revealed in The Times that backers of the tower included Prince Abdul Aziz bin Fahd, a son of the late King Fahd of Saudi Arabia.

=== Interior ===
110 Bishopsgate was designed to feature a concierge-style entrance and reception area, incorporating a 70,000-litre (15,000 imp gal; 18,000 US gal) aquarium containing around 1,200 fish. The aquarium is the largest privately owned example in the United Kingdom and contains over 60 species of fish in an entirely sustainable ecosystem; the species were selected by expert biologists and animal curators to ensure compatibility and adaptability to the environment. The tank is attended to by a team of two full-time fish attendants, who feed the fish a diet rich in natural ingredients according to their requirements and monitor the tank for water chemistry and fish health, and two to three part-time divers who clean the rockwork and glass regularly.

A bar-restaurant called The Drift occupies part of the ground and first floors. There is a restaurant and "sky bar" leased to Sushi Samba and Duck & Waffle, both open to the public, on floors 38–40. Situated 175 metres (574 ft) above the City and accessed by scenic lifts from a dedicated entrance on Bishopsgate, the restaurant and bar also have external terraces.

=== Environment ===
The building uses photovoltaic cells to generate renewable energy, allowing it to achieve a BREEAM rating of 'excellent' in January 2010.

== Construction ==
In March 2007, it was confirmed that Heron had signed a funding deal with the State General Reserve Fund of Oman to provide the equity for the development. The works were carried out by Skanska and completed in January 2011.

=== Gallery ===
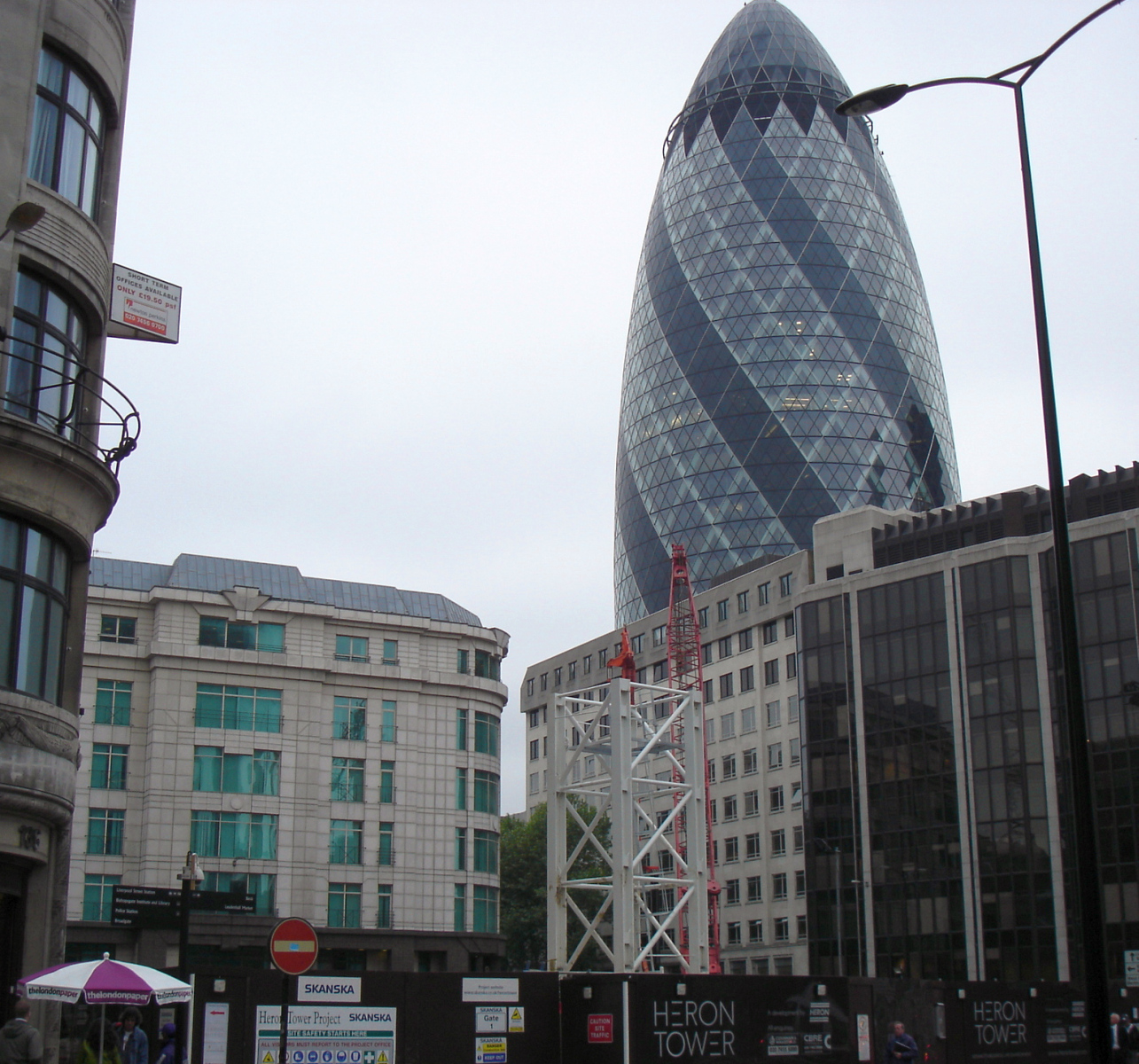
May 2008

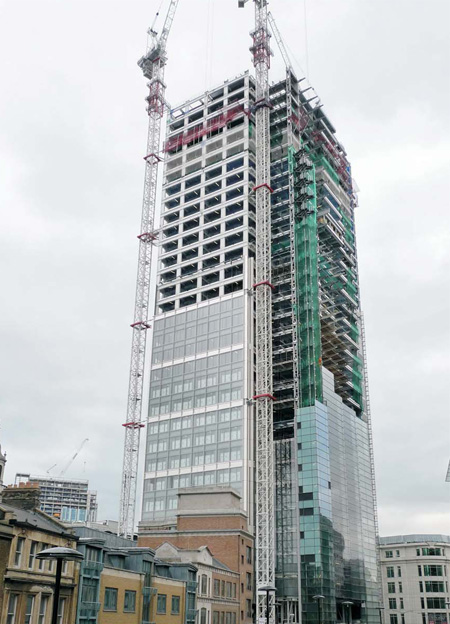
October 2009

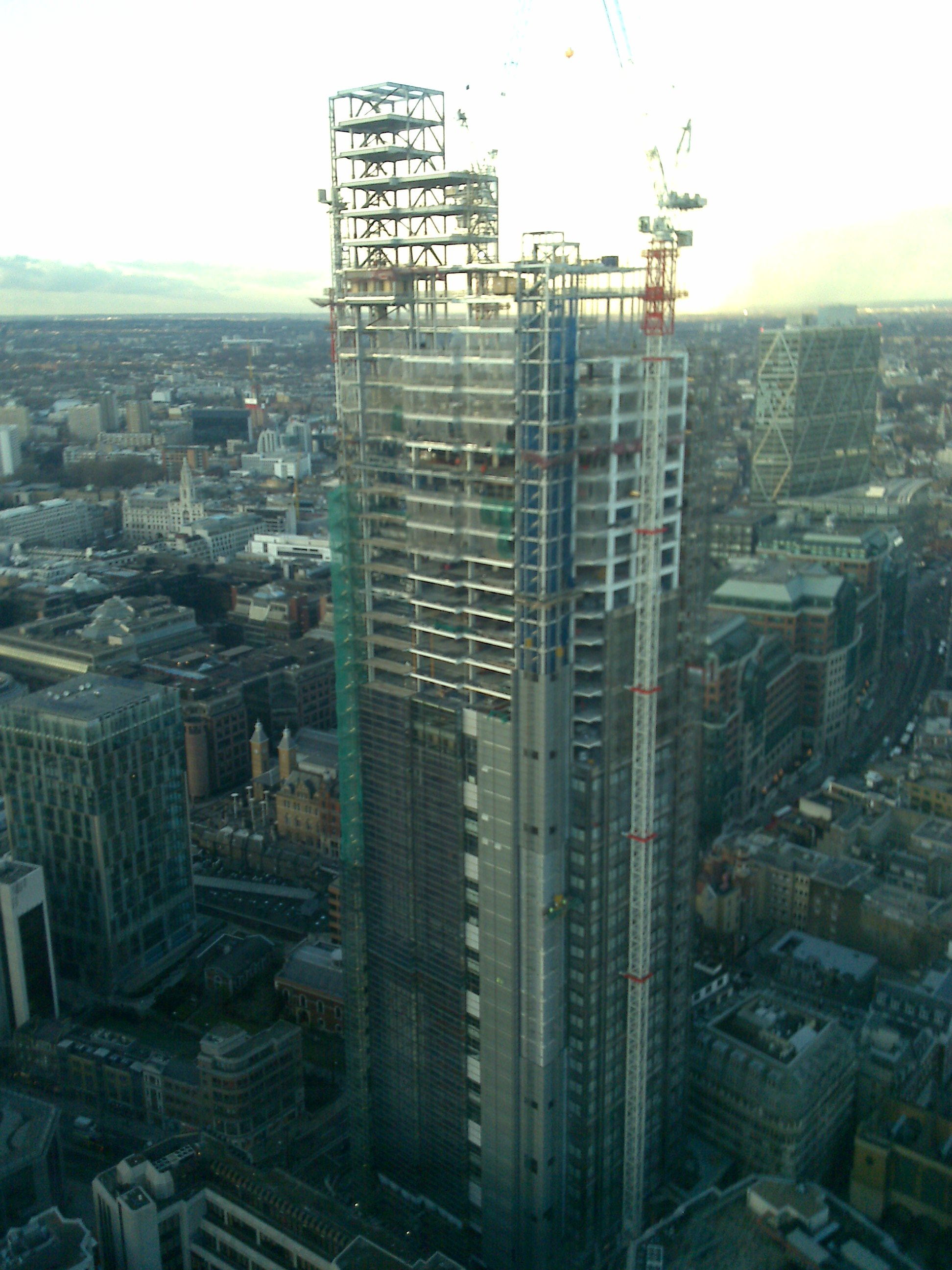
January 2010

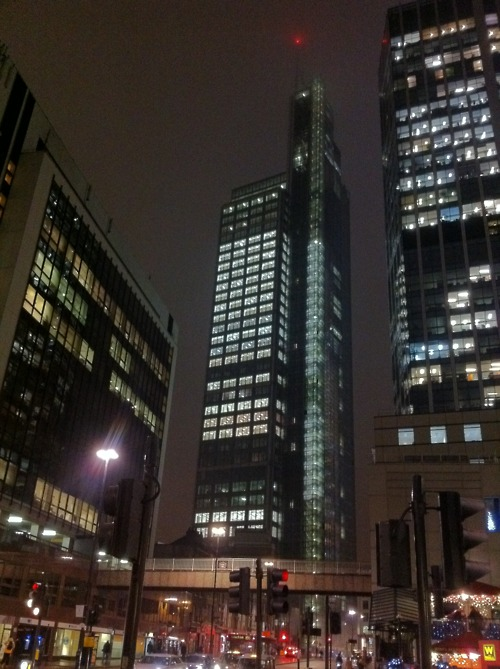
December 2010

== Tenancy ==
The tower's first confirmed tenant was the law firm McDermott Will & Emery, which signed up in July 2010 while the building was still under construction. However, in a difficult lettings market the building struggled to find enough tenants to fill it and in September 2013 only 59% of the available office space had been let. As a result, the project required refinancing, with Starwood Capital Group stepping in to provide a £288 million refinancing facility to avoid the project going into receivership.

Subsequent agreed tenants included the pensions company Partnership Assurance, investment fund manager Securis Investment Partners, stockbroker Westhouse Securities, POWA, recruitment firm Harvey Nash, Openwork, and Salesforce.com, the software firm. As part of Salesforce's deal to take an additional 50,000 sq ft on levels 28-31 on a 15-year lease, it reportedly purchased naming rights to the tower, just as it had for its headquarters building in San Francisco. After much deliberation with the City of London planners, the building's official name was confirmed as 110 Bishopsgate, with Salesforce Tower able to be used as an informal name.

Landmark has offered serviced office space from floors 17-19 of the tower since 2011, achieving above-average occupancy rates for London. The top floors of the building are occupied by the Sushi Samba and Duck & Waffle restaurants.

Proskauer Rose, another law firm, moved into the building in 2015, taking out an 18,000 sq ft lease.

The London office of the Interactive Brokers, a U.S. low cost online brokerage platform, is also present on level 20.

In January 2016, it was confirmed that the building was fully let.

== Heron Plaza ==
The tower was designed to form the centrepiece of a larger Heron Plaza development, incorporating new public spaces and a network of squares and gardens. In July 2009, Heron International confirmed that it had signed heads of terms with Four Seasons Hotels and Resorts to develop a mixed-use project adjacent to 110 Bishopsgate. In January 2011, Heron announced that planning permission for the development had been secured. In August 2014, Heron sold the site, with planning permission, to UOL Group, who said it would push ahead with the scheme and operate the hotel under its 'Pan Pacific' brand.

== See also ==
- List of tallest buildings and structures in London
- 100 Bishopsgate
- City of London landmarks
- The Heron
- Double-deck elevator
- Tower 42

Records
Preceded by Tower 42; 183m	Tallest building in the City of London; 2010 - Present; 230m	Succeeded by None
