= Westfield World Trade Center =

Shopping mall in New York City

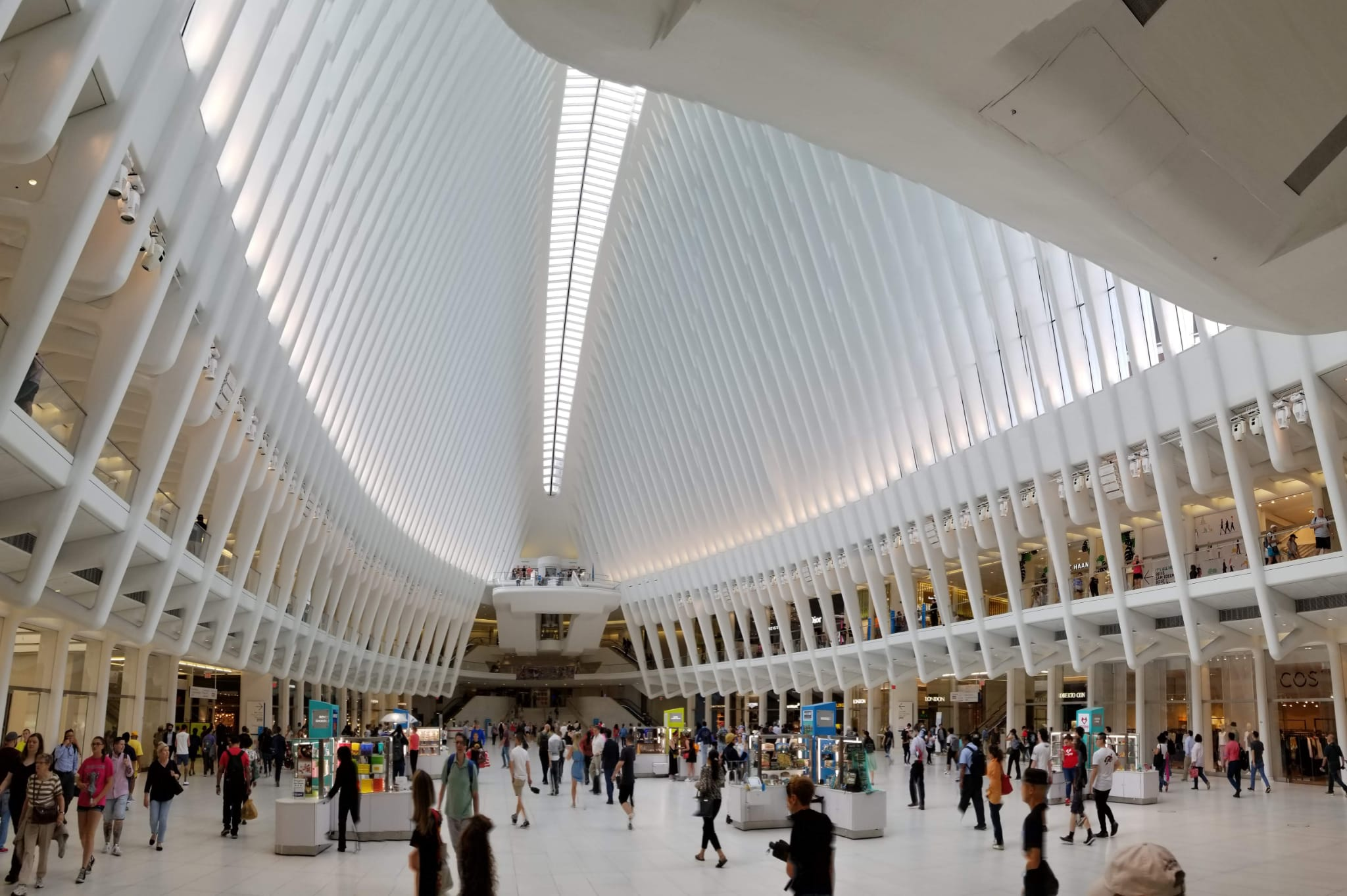
- Shops at the Oculus (2018)
- Location: Manhattan, New York, U.S.
- Coordinates: 40°42′41″N 74°00′43″W
- Address: 185 Greenwich Street, 10007
- Opened: August 16, 2016; 10 years ago
- Developer: Westfield Corporation; Port Authority of New York and New Jersey
- Manager: Unibail-Rodamco-Westfield SE
- Owner: Port Authority of New York and New Jersey
- Architect: Santiago Calatrava
- Num. of stores: 110+ (at peak)
- Floor area: 365,000 square feet (33,900 m^{2})
- Floors: 2
- Public transit: New York City Subway: at WTC Cortlandt at World Trade Center at Cortlandt Street; PATH: NWK-WTC HOB-WTC at World Trade Center; New York City Bus: M55
- Website: www.westfield.com/en/united-states/westfieldworldtradecenter; officialworldtradecenter.com/shopping

Westfield World Trade Center is a shopping mall at the World Trade Center complex in Manhattan, New York City, which is operated and managed by Unibail-Rodamco-Westfield. The mall opened on August 16, 2016, as the largest shopping complex in Manhattan, with 125 retail spaces. It replaced The Mall at the World Trade Center, the underground shopping mall under the original World Trade Center, which was destroyed during the September 11, 2001 attacks.

== Original mall (1975–2001) ==
The Mall at the World Trade Center
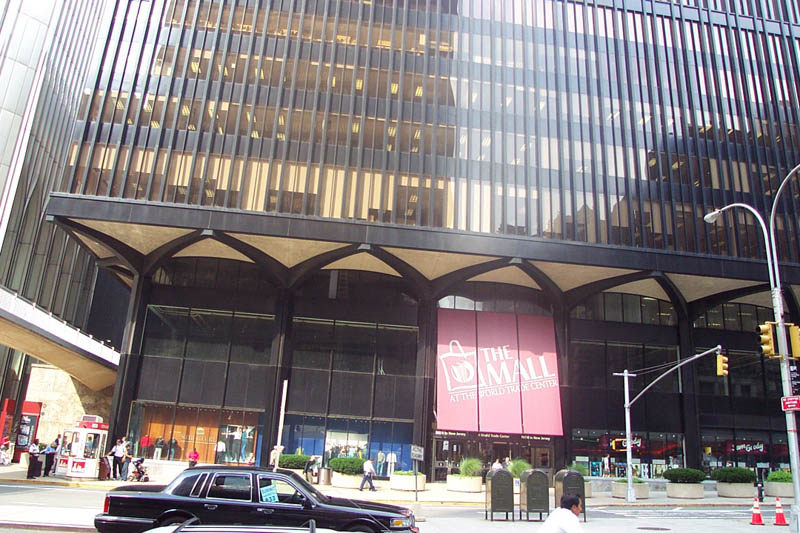
- 4 WTC entrance from Liberty Street (August 2001)
- Address: 4 World Trade Center, 10048
- Opened: 1975; 51 years ago
- Renovated: July 2001 – September 2001 (permanently canceled)
- Closed: September 11, 2001; 25 years ago
- Demolished: December 2001 (heavily damaged in 9/11)
- Developer: Port Authority of New York and New Jersey
- Manager: Westfield Group
- Owner: Port Authority of New York and New Jersey
- Architect: Yamasaki & Associates; Emery Roth & Sons
- Num. of stores: ≈80 (at peak)
- Floors: 2 (Plaza and Concourse level)
- Parking: Paid parking
- Website: panynj.gov/wtc/wtcsfram.HTM (2000 archive)
- Building details
- Map of the original mall prior to its destruction on September 11, 2001

General information
- Status: Destroyed and demolished

Renovating team
- Renovating firm: Westfield Group

The Mall at the World Trade Center was an indoor underground shopping mall that was located in the concourse area of the original World Trade Center complex which was destroyed during the September 11 attacks. If it were not destroyed, the mall would have been renamed to Westfield Shoppingtown World Trade Center in 2002.

Most of the mall was located underneath 4 and 5 World Trade Center, as well as under the Austin J. Tobin Plaza. Completed in 1975, it was the largest shopping mall in New York City, and was managed by the Westfield Group. The main entrance was located on the south side of 4 World Trade Center facing Liberty Street with escalators going down into the concourse. The other entrance was located on the east side of 5 World Trade Center facing Church Street. The mall was also accessible from the lobbies of the Twin Towers, and it served as the point of access or transfer to the Chambers Street–World Trade Center subway station on the A, C, and E trains. PATH trains intersected in the basement levels, which were located under the mall.

The mall included eateries as well as approximately 80 stores, including Borders, Banana Republic, Coach, The Children's Place, Tourneau, J.Crew, Cole Haan, Sephora, Duane Reade, Gap, Johnston & Murphy, Sam Goody, Victoria's Secret and the Warner Bros. Studio Store. Thousands of people traveled through the mall daily.

On April 26, 2001, the Port Authority of New York & New Jersey agreed to lease the mall to the Westfield Group on a 99-year agreement. On July 24, 2001, the deal was accepted. After the purchase, Westfield was planning a massive renovation and expansion of the mall, and was going to rename it Westfield Shoppingtown World Trade Center in 2002. A McDonald's was also planned to open at the mall.

=== September 11 attacks ===
A commonly reported story of eyewitnesses inside the mall at 8:46 a.m. EDT, when American Airlines Flight 11 struck the North Tower, is of fireballs being fed by flaming jet fuel shooting down the elevator shafts and bursting out of the elevators inside the lobby, with many of the fireballs reaching as far as the mall itself.

As stated in the 9/11 Commission Report:

The Port Authority's on-site commanding police officer was standing in the concourse when a fireball exploded out of the North Tower lobby, causing him to dive for cover.

Survivor Allison Summers described the conditions in the mall right after the terrorist attack:

I had almost reached the [Cortlandt Street] Uptown 1 and 9 station when there was an enormous explosion. The building shook. I heard people say, 'Oh, no.' Some, not many, were screaming. ... I looked ahead past Banana Republic, past Citibank to the plaza outside. At that moment, there was a terrifying tidal wave of smoke filling the doorway. It began to shoot forward. The smoke had this enormous momentum that started to come towards us, as if it had a will of its own. We ran. We ran together past the Coach store. We ran to get out of the path of this enormous wave of smoke. It was like we were being chased. All the people on the concourse ran. We turned right, heading toward the PATH trains. As we ran, shop assistants were calling in doorways, 'What happened? What happened?' But we were running so fast we couldn't answer them and they ran with us. Some people were crying; some people were screaming. We moved as one body. No one pushed and no one shoved. We all had the same intention: to get out of the building.

Shortly after the first impact, water began spraying into the mall from broken pipes and activated/broken sprinkler systems. As Erik Ronningen describes:

I drag my body down through the decimated main lobby [of the North Tower], through a waterfall from the Mall ceiling, and wade the darkened Mall corridor through 75 yards [69 m] of ankle-deep water to Tower Two."

=== After 9/11: Search and demolition ===
On September 13, 2001, two days after half of the mall was destroyed in the attacks, Westfield Group and the Port Authority (through Port Authority Police Department) sent the FEMA's Massachusetts Task Force 1 (MATF 1) to investigate the mall, find victims, and determine whether the mall would be repaired or not. Every storefront and entrance in the mall was marked with an orange "X" after a search had been completed in the area. A single slash indicated that a search was in process, and an X in a square meant that the facility was too dangerous to enter. Every X included the date of the search (9 13, meaning September 13, 2001), and additional details such as structural problems and victims found. As of September 2023, these marks can still be found at the preserved subway entrance of the current mall, marked with a plaque explaining what it means.

During the search, it was found that the Bugs Bunny statue at the Warner Bros. Studio Store remained intact, but was covered in dust. The storefront was also intact, but in horrible condition. Subsequently, Warner Bros. was invited to inspect the statues, being offered the option to take them back. However, Warner Bros. allowed the city to keep them, and Bugs Bunny – alongside Tweety Bird, Foghorn Leghorn, a mangled "That's All Folks!" sign and several other statues – were moved to the New York State Museum in Albany, and the 9/11 Memorial Museum. Even before the attacks, the Warner Bros. Studio Store already planned to close all of its stores nationwide – including the WTC location – with liquidation sales starting in February 2001. The chain was expected to be fully defunct by October 2001 after the AOL Time Warner merger was completed. This meant that even if the mall was not destroyed, the store would have already vacated.

People who were evacuating the Twin Towers could not exit outside onto the plaza because of falling debris, so they traveled through the mall and exited through either 4 or 5 World Trade Center.

Westfield and Port Authority confirmed that the original mall was beyond repair. The planned McDonald's was never developed, the renovations were canceled, and the remaining space of the mall was demolished during cleanup of the entire WTC site.

== Current mall (2016–present) ==
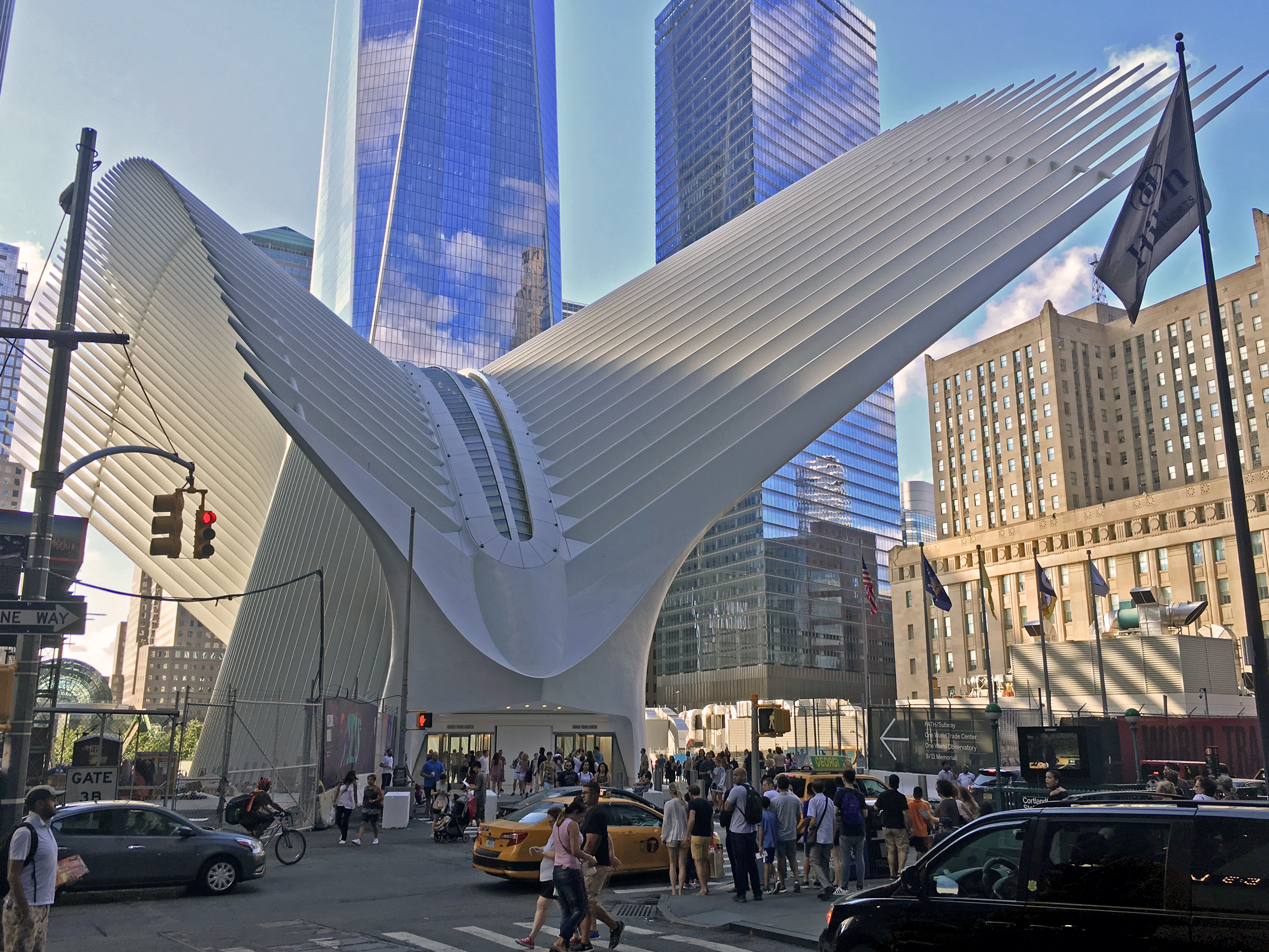
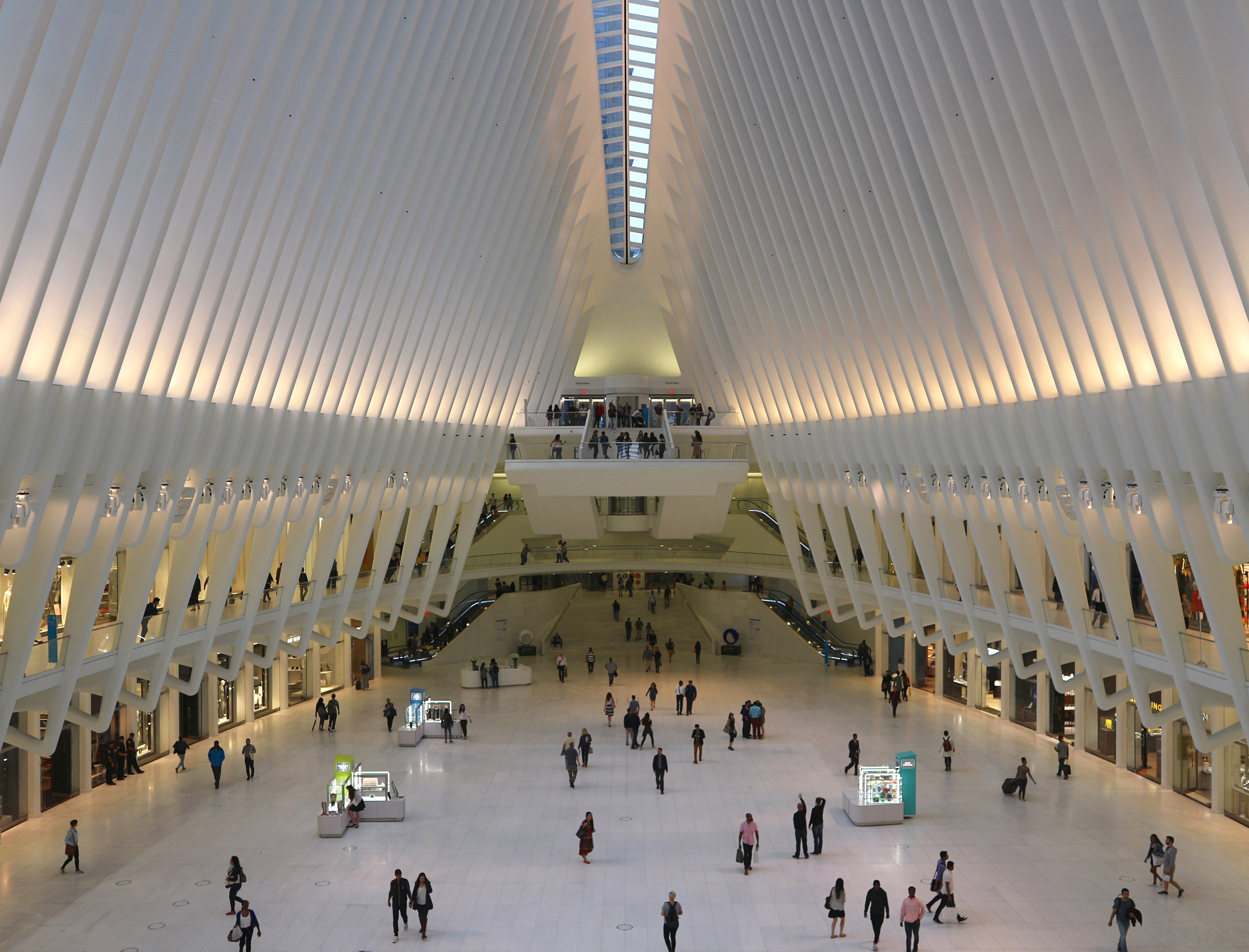
Exterior (top) and interior (bottom) of the Oculus building at Westfield World Trade Center

=== Redevelopment ===
The Oculus has roughly 365,000 square feet (33,900 m^{2}) of retail space. Although the new mall is only spread over roughly one-half of the original mall's footprint (due to the new space required for the below-ground National September 11 Memorial & Museum), the mall is double-level, whereas the original mall was a single level. 3 and 4 World Trade Center currently house three and four aboveground levels, respectively. 2 World Trade Center is planned to contain three additional levels. The World Trade Center station's head house, the Oculus, also houses a large amount of retail space.

According to developer Larry Silverstein, whose firm Silverstein Properties was replaced by Westfield Corporation as the developer:

The design we have developed with the Port Authority calls for not only rebuilding the retail space that was lost on 9/11, but going above and beyond what was there before. We want to create a real destination for visitors and shoppers, a center that will share many of the attributes of the city's great retail hubs.

Construction on the One World Trade Center portion of the mall began in 2007. In February 2012, Westfield Corporation entered an agreement with the Port Authority, which owns the rest of the World Trade Center site, to jointly own and manage the mall. At the same time, Westfield began marketing space in the mall and opened a leasing office in 7 World Trade Center. In December 2013, the Port Authority sold its remaining stake in the retail development to Westfield. This also brings retail at the World Trade Center to Westfield's complete control. The mall was 80% leased as of June 2014. The mall's 125 retail spaces were fully leased by October 2015.

The mall opened on August 16, 2016, with a concert headlined by John Legend and Leslie Odom Jr., the opening of a food court and stores such as Pandora and Apple. In total, there were about 60 stores in the mall when it opened. By 2017, there were 82 stores within the mall, although much of the mall's space had not been leased. Some tenants were also moving out, and the Port Authority was also rebuilding nine storefronts in front of the PATH station's entrance. These nine storefronts, which were considered prime retail space, were not available because that location had been the site of the former entrance to the temporary PATH station.

Oculus Plaza

The neighboring Oculus Plaza has had public art installations and events.
