= Larry Silverstein =

American businessman (born 1931)

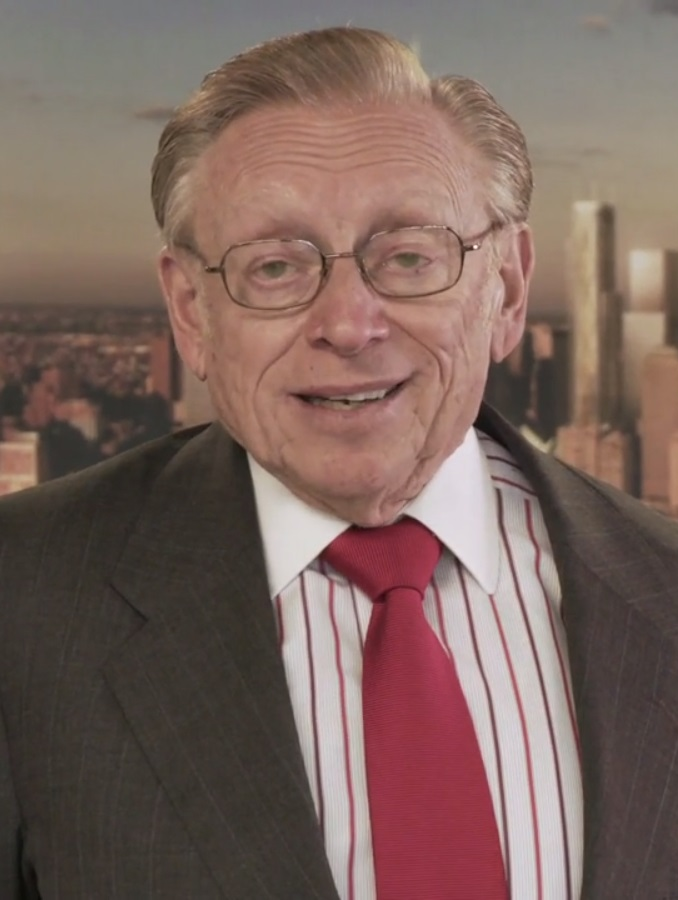
- Silverstein appearing for UJA-Federation of New York in 2014
- Born: May 30, 1931 (age 95); New York City, U.S.
- Education: New York University (BA); Brooklyn Law School (JD)
- Occupation: Owner of Silverstein Properties
- Spouse: Klara (m. 1956)
- Children: 3

Larry A. Silverstein (born May 30, 1931) is an American billionaire businessman. Among his real estate projects, he is the developer of the rebuilt World Trade Center complex in Lower Manhattan, New York City, as well as one of New York's tallest residential towers at 30 Park Place, where he owns a home. As of December 2024, he had an estimated net worth of US$1 billion according to Forbes.

Silverstein was born in Brooklyn, and became involved in real estate, together with his father, establishing Silverstein Properties. Silverstein separated from his business partner, Bernard Mendik, in 1977, and bought a number of large office buildings in Midtown and Lower Manhattan in the late 1970s. In 1980, he won a bid from the Port Authority of New York and New Jersey to construct 7 World Trade Center on Vesey Street, just north of the main World Trade Center site. He was interested in acquiring the original World Trade Center complex, and put in a bid when the Port Authority put it up for lease in 2000. He won the bid when a deal between the initial winner and the Port Authority fell through, and he signed the lease on July 24, 2001.

Soon after the September 11 attacks, in 2001, Silverstein declared his intent to rebuild, though he and his insurers became embroiled in a multi-year dispute over whether the attacks had constituted one event or two under the terms of the insurance policy, which provided for a maximum of $3.55 billion coverage per event. A settlement was reached in 2007, with insurers agreeing to pay out $4.55 billion, which was not as much as Silverstein had sought. He also ran into multiple disputes with other parties in the rebuilding effort, including with the Port Authority. In an agreement reached in April 2006, Silverstein retained rights to build three office towers (150 Greenwich Street, 175 Greenwich Street, and 200 Greenwich Street), while One World Trade Center (previously referred to as the "Freedom Tower") would be owned by the Port Authority, as would Tower Five, which meant it would have the option of leasing to a different private developer and being redesigned as a residential building.

== Early life and education ==
Silverstein was born in Bedford–Stuyvesant, Brooklyn, in 1931 into a Jewish family. Growing up, he enjoyed classical music and played the piano. He attended the High School of Music and Art in New York, and then New York University, graduating in 1952. During college, he worked at a summer camp, where he met his wife-to-be, Klara. They married in 1956, and had three children: Lisa, Roger and Sharon. His wife worked as a school teacher, supporting the family on her salary for the first few years of their marriage while Silverstein attended classes at Brooklyn Law School.

Silverstein became involved in real estate with his father, Harry G. Silverstein, and then with his friend and brother-in-law, Bernard H. Mendik. In 1957, they established Silverstein Properties, as Harry G. Silverstein & Sons, and bought their first building in Manhattan. Mendik and Silverstein continued the business after the elder Silverstein's death in 1966. In 1977, Mendik divorced Annette Silverstein Mendik, and the business partnership also ended at that time. Mendik cited disagreements over real estate strategies, as Mendik wanted to buy buildings while Silverstein wanted to build.

== Career ==
Silverstein and Mendik remained involved in the real-estate industry, but in separate firms. By 1978, Silverstein owned five buildings on Fifth Avenue, as well as 44 Wall Street and a shopping center in Stamford, Connecticut. In 1980, he renovated the building at 11 West 42nd Street, and acquired the lease for the Equitable Building at 120 Broadway. In 1983, he sold the building at 711 Fifth Avenue to Coca-Cola for $57.6 million.

Also in 1980, Silverstein bought the building at 120 Wall Street, which was constructed in 1930. In 1991, he set aside 20 floors of 120 Wall Street to be leased by non-profit organizations, as an Association Center, with tax incentives for the tenants and bonds for Silverstein to undertake building renovations. By 1994, he had signed up 14 nonprofit tenants, and the building was nearly at capacity by 1997, with 38 nonprofit tenants including the National Urban League and the Illuminating Engineering Society of North America.

In 1980, Silverstein won a bid to lease and develop the last undeveloped parcel from the Port Authority of New York and New Jersey, to build the 47-story 7 World Trade Center.

=== World Trade Center ===
During the 1990s, New York was suffering from the effects of the 1987 stock market crash, which led to high vacancy rates at the World Trade Center. George Pataki became Governor of New York in 1995 on a campaign of cutting costs, including privatizing the World Trade Center. A sale of the property was considered too complex, so it was decided by the Port Authority to open a 99-year lease to competitive bidding.

In January 2001, Silverstein, via Silverstein Properties, made a $3.22 billion bid to lease-purchase the World Trade Center. He was outbid by $30 million by Vornado Realty, with Boston Properties and Brookfield Properties also competing for the lease. However, Vornado withdrew in March, giving Silverstein 14 days to negotiate a new bid. His negotiated bid was finalized on April 26, 2001, in partnership with Westfield America, Inc. and accepted on July 24, 2001. It was the first time in the complex's 31-year history that it had changed management. After it withdrew, Vornado announced a deal with Bloomberg LP to finance Bloomberg's new headquarters at 731 Lexington Avenue.

The lease agreement applied to One, Two, Four, and Five World Trade Center, and about 425,000 square feet (39,500 m^{2}) of retail space. Silverstein put up $14 million of his own money to secure the deal. The agreement gave Silverstein, as leaseholder, the right and the obligation to rebuild the structures if they were destroyed.

==== September 11 attacks ====
Silverstein has said in interviews that he usually spent his mornings in breakfast meetings at Windows on the World on top of the World Trade Center North Tower, and with new tenants in the building. However, on the morning of September 11, 2001, his wife insisted he attend a medical appointment, inadvertently saving him from certain death.

All of the buildings at the World Trade Center were either destroyed or damaged beyond repair on September 11, 2001. After a protracted dispute with insurers over the amount of coverage for rebuilding World Trade Center buildings 1, 2, 4 and 5, a series of court decisions determined that a maximum of $4.55 billion was payable, and settlements were reached with the insurers in 2007.

==== Insurance dispute ====
The insurance policies for World Trade Center buildings 1 WTC, 2 WTC, 4 WTC and 5 WTC had a collective face amount of $3.55 billion. After the September 11 attacks, Silverstein sought to collect double the face amount (~$7.1 billion) on the basis that the two separate airplane strikes into two separate buildings constituted two occurrences within the meaning of the policies. The insurance companies took the opposite view, and the matter went to court. Based on differences in the definition of "occurrence" (the insurance policy term governing the amount of insurance) and uncertainties over which definition of "occurrence" applied, the court split the insurers into two groups for jury trials on the question of which definition of "occurrence" applied and whether the insurance contracts were subject to the "one occurrence" interpretation or the "two-occurrence" interpretation.

The first trial resulted in a verdict on April 29, 2004, that ten of the insurers in this group were subject to the "one occurrence" interpretation, so their liability was limited to the face value of those policies, and three insurers were added to the second trial group. The jury was unable to reach a verdict on one insurer, Swiss Reinsurance, at that time, but did so several days later on May 3, 2004, finding that the company was also subject to the "one-occurrence" interpretation. Silverstein appealed the Swiss Re decision, but he lost that appeal on October 19, 2006. The second trial resulted in a verdict on December 6, 2004, that nine insurers were subject to the "two occurrences" interpretation and, therefore, liable for a maximum of double the face value of those particular policies ($2.2 billion). The total potential payout, therefore, was capped at $4.577 billion for buildings 1, 2, 4, and 5. An appraisal followed to determine the value of the insured loss.

In July 2006, Silverstein and the Port Authority of New York and New Jersey filed a lawsuit against some of its insurers, for refusing to waive requirements of the insurance contracts that Silverstein claimed were necessary to allow renegotiation of the original July 2001 World Trade Center leases. This litigation was settled, together with the federal lawsuits and appraisal (described in the prior paragraph), in a series of settlements announced on May 23, 2007. Silverstein's lease with the Port Authority for the World Trade Center complex requires him to continue paying $102 million annually in base rent. As of 2007, he was applying insurance payments toward the redevelopment of the World Trade Center site.

In March 2007, Silverstein appeared at a rally of construction workers and public officials outside of an insurance industry conference to highlight what he describes as the failures of insurers Allianz & Royal and Sun Alliance to pay $800 million in claims related to the attacks. Insurers cite an agreement to split payments between Mr. Silverstein and the Port Authority as a cause for concern.

==== Rebuilding ====
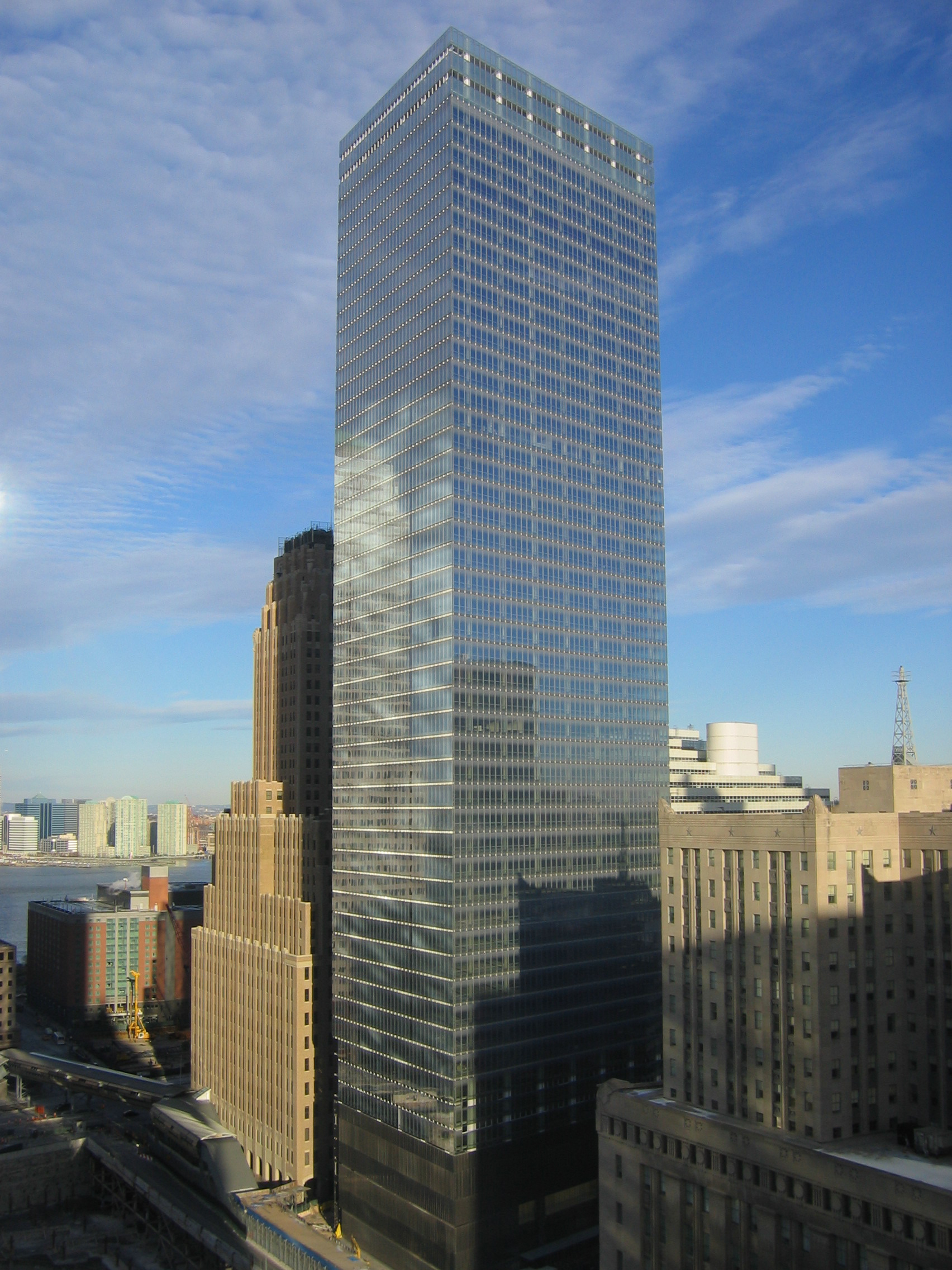
The new, 52-story 7 World Trade Center

As leaseholder of buildings One, Two, Four and Five, Silverstein had the legal right to rebuild the buildings, including 1 World Trade Center at the World Trade Center site which would later be designated as building One. While the site remains unoccupied, he continues to pay $10 million per month in rent to the Port Authority of New York and New Jersey.

After the September 11 attacks, the United States Congress approved $8 billion in tax-exempt Liberty Bonds to fund development in the private sector at lower-than-market interest rates. $3.4 billion remained unallocated in March 2006 designated for Lower Manhattan, with about half of the funds under the control of Mayor Michael Bloomberg and the other half under the control of former governor Pataki.

In April 2006, after several months of negotiation aimed toward permitting reconstruction to commence, Silverstein yielded some of his rights back to the Port Authority to facilitate rebuilding at the site. Silverstein ceded his rights to building One (and its pro-rata share of the above-noted Liberty Bond funds), and allocated a portion of the insurance proceeds to the rebuilding of building One in favor of the Port Authority. In return, the remaining pro-rata shares of the Liberty Bond funds were allocated to Silverstein Properties for purposes of rebuilding the remaining buildings, and government agencies are expected to be among their tenants.

The construction of One World Trade Center started on April 27, 2006. Lack of financing had prevented construction from commencing earlier. The proceeds of the insurance policies arising from the destruction of the previous buildings were insufficient to cover the cost of rebuilding all the insured buildings. The first rebuilt building in the World Trade Center complex, 7 World Trade Center, reopened on May 23, 2006, and by the end of September 2011, was fully leased. The second building, 4 World Trade Center, reopened on November 13, 2013. This was followed by One World Trade Center on November 3, 2014. 3 World Trade Center opened on June 11, 2018, while 2 World Trade Center has yet to be completed, having been delayed indefinitely because of the loss of a prospective anchor tenant.

External videos
- Q&A interview with Silverstein on The Rising, December 15, 2024, C-SPAN

In 2024, Silverstein released his memoir, The Rising: The Twenty-Year Battle to Rebuild the World Trade Center, about the events leading up to his purchase of the World Trade Center, his experiences on and subsequent to 9/11, and the circumstances surrounding the new construction on that site.

=== Other projects ===
While Silverstein is most famous for his involvement at the World Trade Center, his holdings include many other buildings in New York City, including 1177 Avenue of the Americas, 529 Fifth Avenue, and 570 Seventh Avenue.

Among his residential projects is an extensive complex that takes up the entire block between 42nd and 41st Street and between 11th and 12th Avenue in the Hell's Kitchen neighborhood. Projects on the block include One River Place which opened in 2001. In May 2009, the twin-towered Silver Towers opened. At 60 stories, it is the tallest rental building in New York.

Silverstein was also involved as a developer of the Ronald Reagan Building in Washington, D.C., which is home to the Woodrow Wilson Center.

In November 2006, Silverstein agreed to buy the building at 99 Church Street from Moody's for $170 million. Moody's moved its headquarters two blocks west into Silverstein's rebuilt 7 World Trade Center in 2007. The old building at 99 Church Street (between Barclay Street and Park Place, behind the Woolworth Building) was promptly razed to make way for Silverstein's new project on the site. The 2008 plan proposed a 68-story, 912-foot tower, composed of a Four Seasons Hotel on the first 22 stories, and condominiums in the upper two-thirds. However, due to lack of financing, the project was on hold until 2013, and completed in 2016. The building, the tallest residential tower downtown, designed by Robert A. M. Stern and marketed as 30 Park Place, officially opened on October 5, 2016. Silverstein bought a $34 million penthouse on the 80th floor of the building, which overlooks the World Trade Center complex. He sold his previous apartment, custom designed by James Stewart Polshek at 500 Park Avenue, in January 2019.

One West End, a 42-story, 246-unit condominium tower designed by Pelli Clarke Pelli, opened in 2017. It was the first of five towers to open at the new Riverside Center megadevelopment on Manhattan's far West Side, which Silverstein developed in partnership with the Elad Group.

In 1989, Silverstein proposed to members of the Israeli government that a free trade zone should be created within the Negev region of Israel. The project ultimately failed, but enjoyed popular support among leading Israeli political figures.

In 2020, Silverstein Properties acquired the U.S. Bank Tower in downtown Los Angeles for about $430 million.

== Philanthropy ==
Silverstein has been involved in his alma mater, as founder and chairman emeritus of New York University's Real Estate Institute, and as a trustee of the New York University Medical Center and Health System. Silverstein also has served as chairman of the United Jewish Appeal in New York, the Realty Foundation, trustee of the Museum of Jewish Heritage, and treasurer of the National Jewish Medical and Research Center in Denver. Silverstein is also a governor of The Real Estate Board of New York.

In 2012, Silverstein donated $5 million to Hunter College, his wife Klara's alma mater, to fund the Klara and Larry Silverstein Student Success Center. Silverstein surprised Klara with the gift after she gave her farewell remarks as chairwoman of the Hunter College Foundation board of directors. That same year, he and Klara donated $5.25 million to New York University School of Medicine to create the Silverstein Scholarship Fund. On May 17, 2017, Silverstein delivered the keynote address to the School of Medicine's graduating class, which included seven Silverstein Scholars.
