= 5 World Trade Center (1972–2001) =

Former building in Manhattan, New York

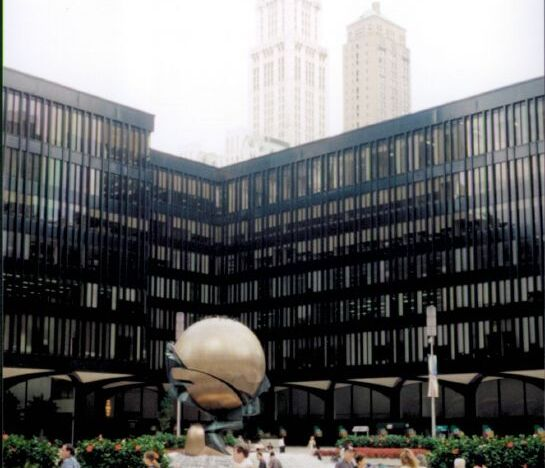
- 5 World Trade Center as seen from the Austin J. Tobin Plaza
- Alternative names: 5 WTC; WTC 5; Building 5

General information
- Status: Demolished
- Type: Office
- Architectural style: Modern
- Location: Lower Manhattan, New York City, United States
- Coordinates: 40°42′43″N 74°0′41″W
- Current tenants: List
- Construction started: 1970
- Opened: March 1972
- Demolished: December 2001 (heavily damaged on September 11, 2001)
- Owner: Port Authority of New York and New Jersey

Height
- Height: 118 ft (36 m)

Technical details
- Floor count: 9

Design and construction
- Architects: Yamasaki & Associates; Emery Roth & Sons

5 World Trade Center, also known as the Northeast Plaza Building, was a nine-story building in Lower Manhattan in New York City. Part of the World Trade Center complex, it opened in March 1972. The building was damaged during the September 11 attacks and was later demolished. The former site is now the location of the World Trade Center Transportation Hub and the proposed 2 World Trade Center.

== History ==
5 World Trade Center (5 WTC) was originally a steel-framed nine-story low-rise office building built in 1970–72 at New York City's World Trade Center. The building was designed by Minoru Yamasaki and Emery Roth & Sons. The structure was 118 ft (36 m) tall and had a black exterior. The building was L-shaped and occupied the northeast corner of the World Trade Center site. Overall dimensions were 330 by 420 feet (100 by 130 m), with an average area of 120,000 square feet (11,000 m^{2}) per floor. It hosted a police desk.

The Chambers Street and World Trade Center (A, C, and E trains) subway stations were located directly east of the building, and one exit to the station was available through the lobby. The building's remaining underground concourse space housed The Mall at the World Trade Center. The largest Borders in New York City spread across three floors of 5 World Trade Center, on the corner of the building adjacent to the intersection of Church and Vesey Street.

In 1984, artist Joanna Gilman Hyde painted the 10,000-square-foot (930 m^{2}) canvas titled "Self Organizing Galaxy" on the roof of 5 World Trade Center, a temporary art exhibit. It took eight days to paint and was signed on October 10, 1984.

=== September 11 attacks ===
5 WTC was the least damaged building of the entire complex. Floors 4–9 suffered partial collapse and/or fire damage as a result of the September 11 attacks, while Floors 1–3 were not damaged. The building's structural integrity on its upper floors were partially compromised due to the impact of steel and other debris from the North Tower. Other collapsed sections were due to fire damage. Portions of internal collapse and burnout were found on upper floors, mainly floors 6–8. The black exterior facade suffered severe fire damage. Floors 5–9 were on fire after the collapse of the South Tower. A section of the fuselage from United Airlines Flight 175 landed on the roof and a plane engine was found in the ninth floor cafeteria. The Borders was undamaged after both towers collapsed.

The building was declared safe and salvagable but was still condemned for demolition and was demolished by weakening its internal structure and using cables to pull down the rest of the structure, the same way 4 and 6 World Trade Center were demolished. The last standing section of 5 WTC was removed by December 2001.

The Federal Emergency Management Agency (FEMA)/ASCE Building Performance Study Team found that some connections between the structural steel beams failed in the fire. This was most apparent in the collapse of 5 World Trade Center, where the fireproofing did not protect the connections, causing the structure to fail. The structural failure didn't cause the entire building to collapse, as seen after the attacks that the structural framework remained intact.

The building was the location of the Survivors' Staircase, which was moved 200 feet along Vesey Street in 2008 to prevent further damage. In 2010, the staircase was placed inside the National September 11 Memorial & Museum, where it resides today.

2 World Trade Center will stand at the exact location where the original 5 World Trade Center once stood.

== Tenants ==
The following is a list of tenants of 5 World Trade Center prior to its destruction:

FL#	Companies
9	Credit Suisse First Boston, American Shipper Magazine, Council of State Governments, Howard Publications, Hunan Resources and Tech Institute, Lower Manhattan Cultural Council, Our Planet Management Institute
8	Credit Suisse First Boston, Continental Forwarding, New York Court of Claims, Hon. Christopher J. Mega
7	Credit Suisse First Boston
6	Morgan Stanley
5	Morgan Stanley
4	Morgan Stanley
3	Borders, Affiliated Physicians of St. Vincent, World Trade Center Dental
2	Borders
PL	Chase Bank, Citibank, Borders, Children's Discovery Center, Krispy Kreme, Morgan Stanley, HSBC Bank, FedEx, DHL, Satellite Airlines Counter, Daniel Pehr, Inc.
C	The Mall at the World Trade Center

The Satellite Airlines Counter, in the Plaza Level, was a retail space where airlines would lease out "booths" to house airline services. Tenants included Delta Air Lines, United Airlines, US Airways, and many others.

== Gallery ==
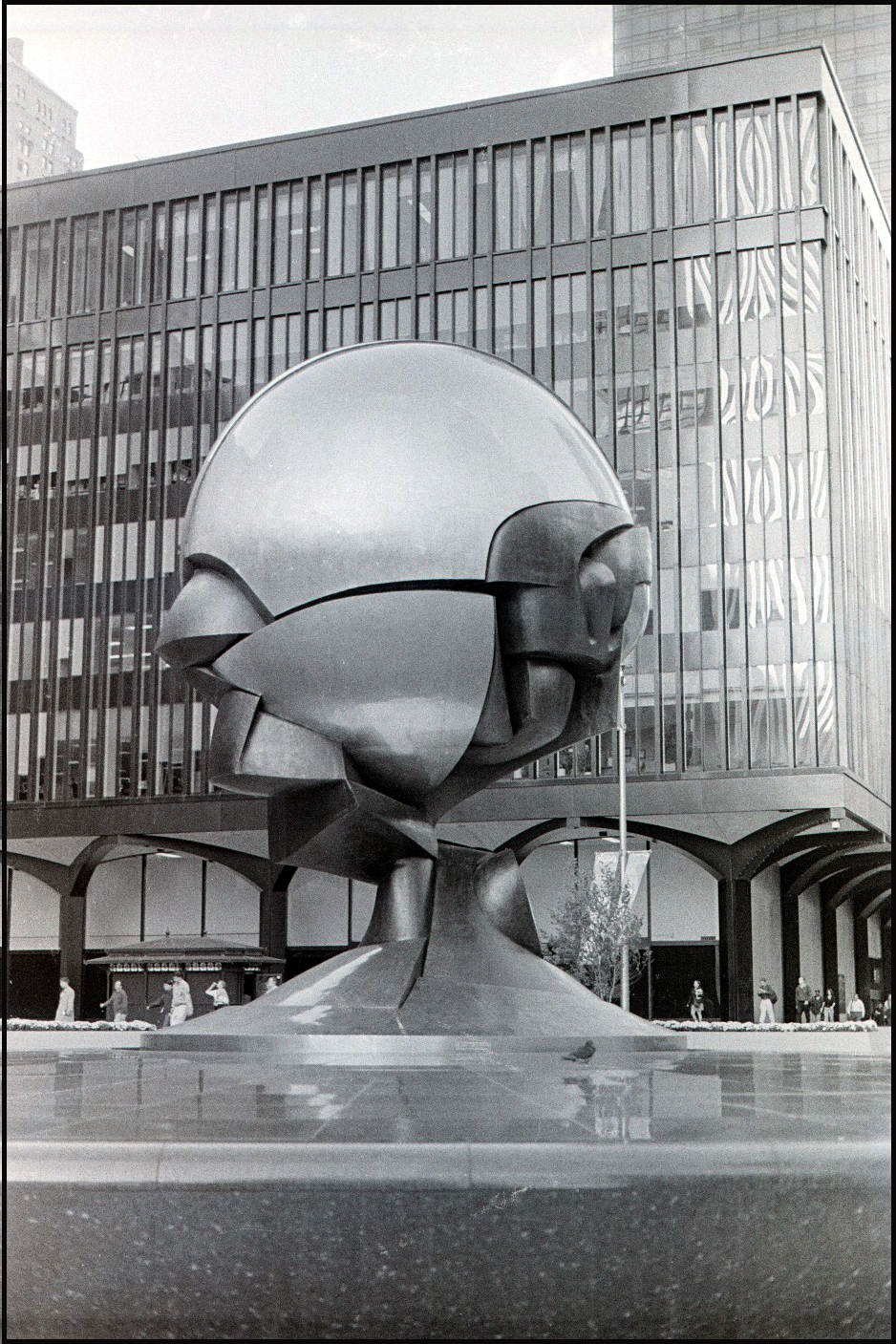
Original 5 World Trade Center building seen from the courtyard of The Sphere, 1998.

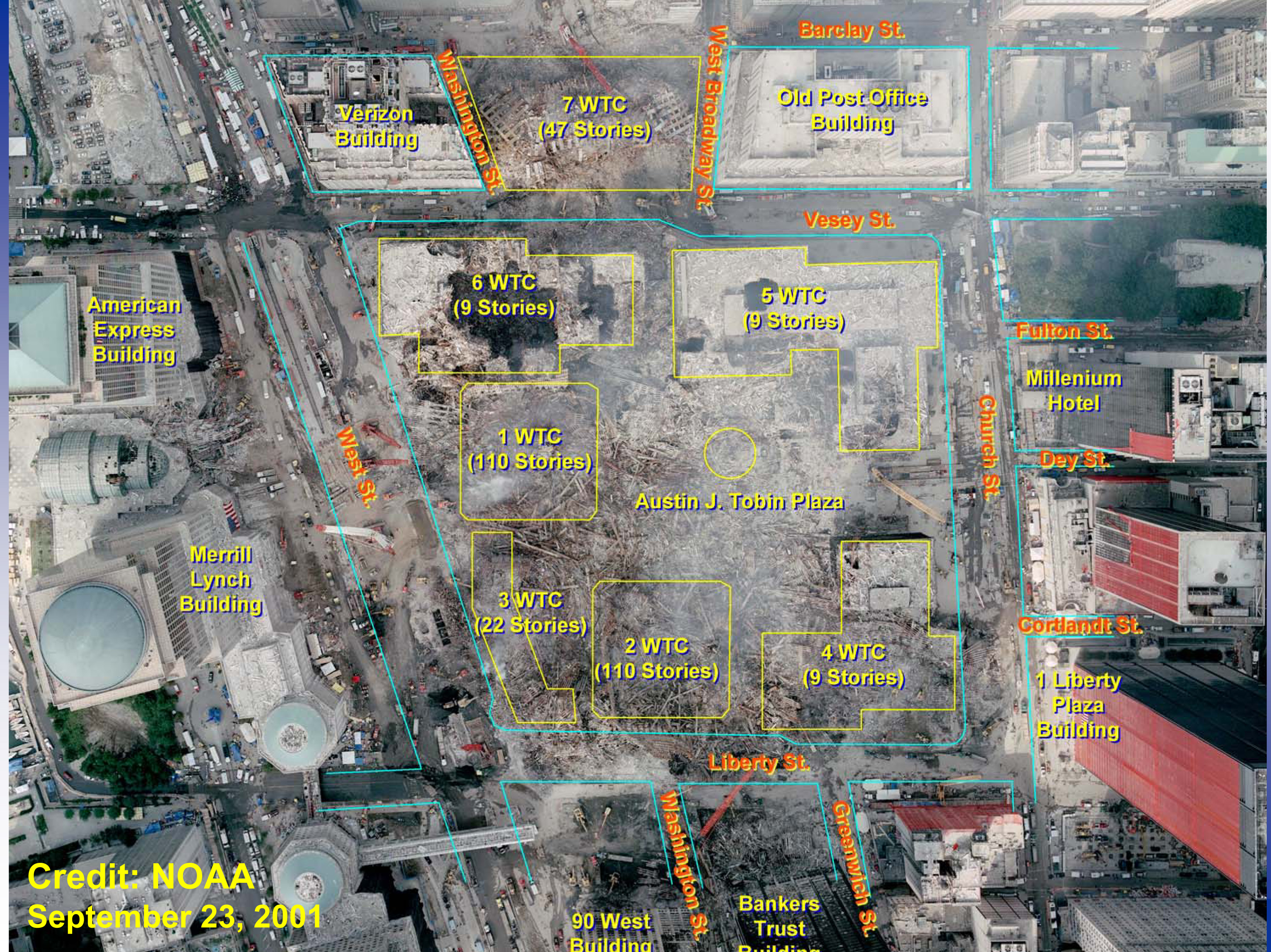
An aerial view of the World Trade Center site, including 5 WTC, after the September 11 attacks, featuring the building footprints.

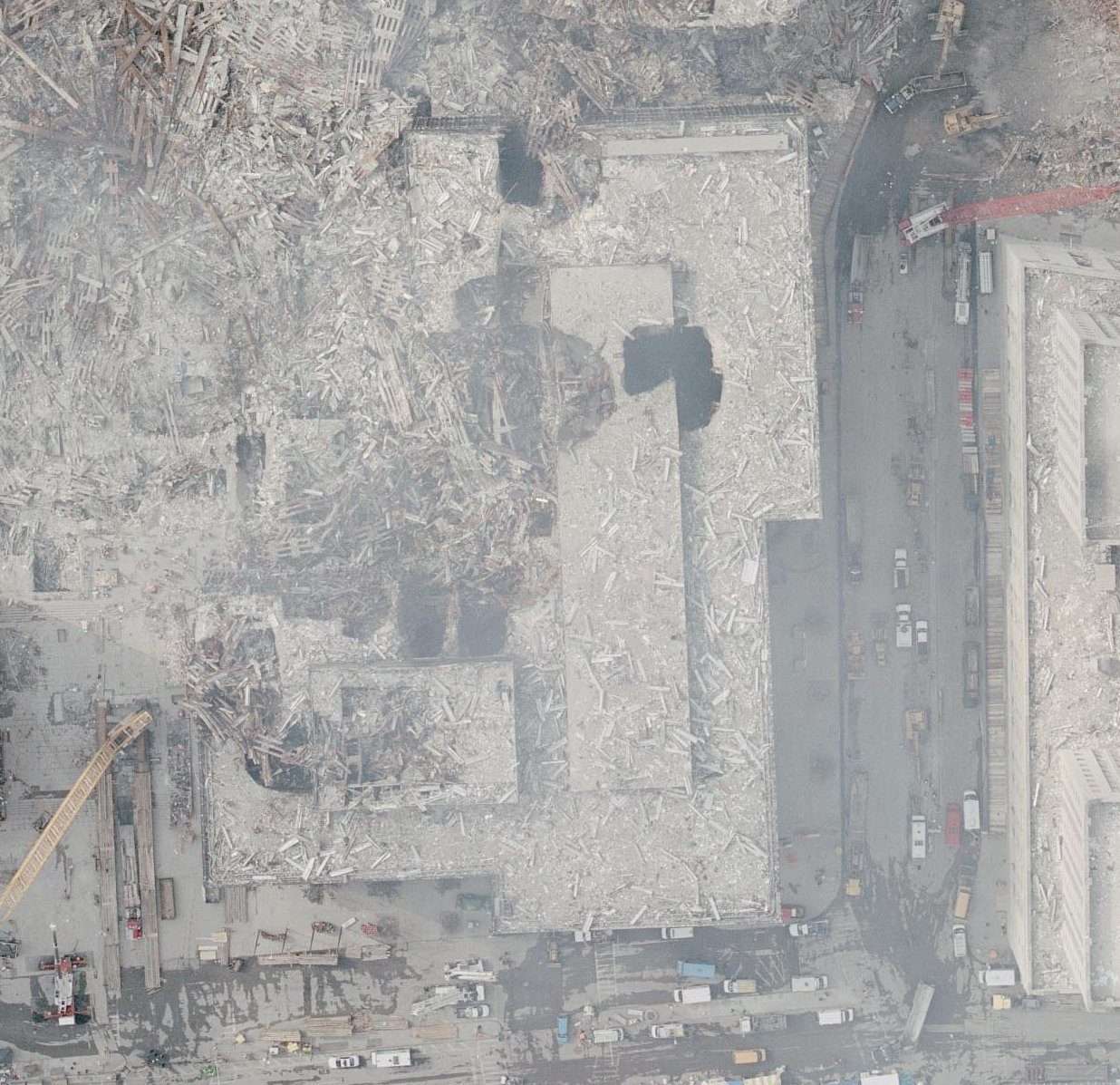
Closeup of WTC 5's remains from the air.
