= 2 World Trade Center =

Planned skyscraper in Manhattan, New York

- 200 Greenwich Street
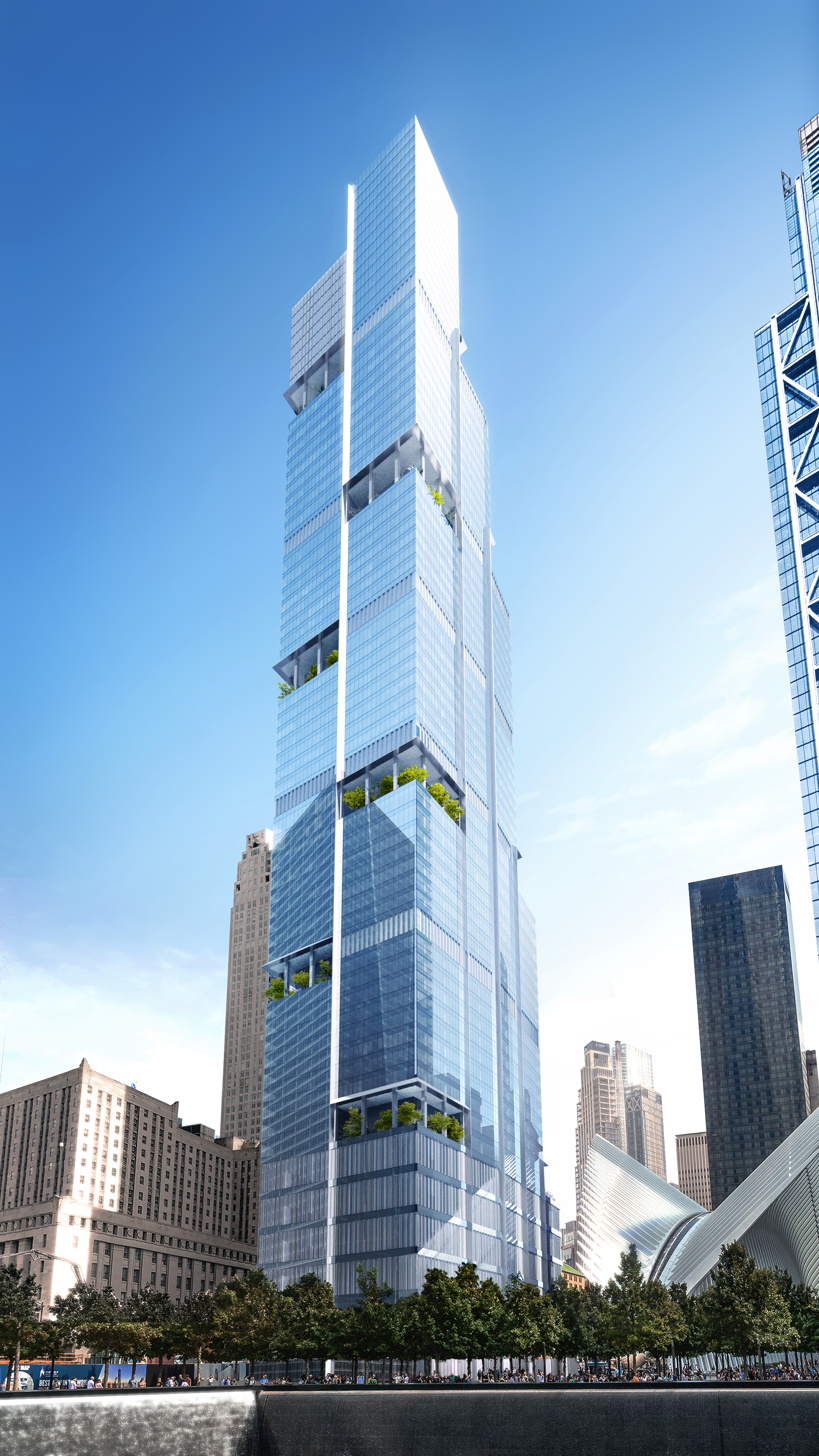
- Artist's impression of the proposal revealed by American Express in February 2026, designed by Foster and Partners

General information
- Status: Under construction
- Type: Commercial
- Architectural style: Neomodern
- Location: 200 Greenwich Street, Manhattan, New York City 10007, United States
- Coordinates: 40°42′44″N 74°00′40″W
- Construction started: July 9, 2026
- Estimated completion: 2031
- Owner: Port Authority of New York and New Jersey

Height
- Architectural: 1,226 ft (374 m)

Technical details
- Floor count: 55
- Floor area: 2,800,000 ft^{2} (260,000 m^{2})

Design and construction
- Architects: Foster and Partners, AAI Architects, P.C. (as architect of record)
- Developer: Silverstein Properties
- Engineer: Jaros Baum & Bolles
- Structural engineer: WSP Cantor Seinuk
- Services engineer: Van Deusen & Associates

References
- https://www.curbed.com/2022/02/2-world-trade-center-new-design-foster-partners.html

2 World Trade Center (2 WTC; also known as 200 Greenwich Street) is a skyscraper under construction as part of the rebuilt World Trade Center complex in Manhattan, New York City. It takes the name of the original 2 World Trade Center, which was part of the first World Trade Center in 1973 and subsequently destroyed during the September 11 attacks in 2001. It will occupy the position of the original 5 World Trade Center. The foundation work was completed in 2013.

Foster and Partners originally proposed a design for the new tower in 2006. Successive designs contained between 60 and 80 floors with heights ranging from 1,230 to 1,360 feet. In February 2026, American Express announced it would develop and occupy the tower; the revised design called for a 55-story, approximately 2-million-square-foot tower. A groundbreaking ceremony took place in July 2026, and the tower is expected to be completed in 2031.

== Original building (1972–2001) ==
The construction of the original World Trade Center was conceived as an urban renewal project and spearheaded by David Rockefeller. The project was intended to help revitalize Lower Manhattan. The project was planned by the Port Authority of New York and New Jersey (PANYNJ), which hired architect Minoru Yamasaki. The twin towers at 1 and 2 World Trade Center were designed as framed tube structures, giving tenants open floor plans, unobstructed by columns or walls. One World Trade Center was the North Tower, and Two World Trade Center was the South Tower. Each tower was over 1,350 feet (410 m) high, and occupied about 1 acre (0.40 ha) of the total 16 acres (6.5 ha) of the site's land. Of the 110 stories in each tower, 8 were set aside as mechanical floors. All the remaining floors were open for tenants. Each floor of the tower had 40,000 square feet (3,700 m^{2}) of available space. The North and South towers had 3,800,000 square feet (350,000 m^{2}) of total office space.

Construction of the South Tower began in August 1966; extensive use of prefabricated components sped up the construction process. The first tenants moved into the South Tower in January 1972. In the 1970s, four other low-level buildings were built as part of the World Trade Center complex. A seventh building was built in the mid-1980s. The entire complex of seven buildings had a combined total of 13,400,000 square feet (1,240,000 m^{2}) of office space.

At 9:03 a.m. EDT on September 11, 2001, five terrorists crashed United Airlines Flight 175 into the southern face of the South Tower, shortly after American Airlines Flight 11 had hit the North Tower. Three buildings in the World Trade Center complex, including 2 WTC, collapsed due to fire-induced structural failure. The South Tower collapsed at 9:59 a.m. after burning for 56 minutes in the fire caused by the impact of United Airlines Flight 175 and the explosion of its fuel.

== New building ==
=== Site redevelopment ===
Preliminary site plans for the World Trade Center rebuild

Larry Silverstein had leased the original World Trade Center from the PANYNJ in July 2001. His company Silverstein Properties continued to pay rent on the site even after the September 11 attacks. In the months following the attacks, architects and urban planning experts held meetings and forums to discuss ideas for rebuilding the site. The architect Daniel Libeskind won a competition to design the master plan for the new World Trade Center in February 2003. The master plan included five towers, a 9/11 memorial, and a transportation hub. By July 2004, the 65-story 2 World Trade Center was being proposed for the northeast corner of the site. The plans were delayed due to disputes over who would redevelop the five towers. The PANYNJ and Silverstein ultimately reached an agreement in 2006. Silverstein Properties ceded the rights to develop 1 and 5 WTC in exchange for financing with liberty bonds for 2, 3, and 4 WTC.

British architect Norman Foster of Foster and Partners was hired to design the new 2 World Trade Center, on the northeastern part of the World Trade Center site at 200 Greenwich Street, in May 2006. Meanwhile, Richard Rogers and Fumihiko Maki were selected as the architects for 3 and 4 World Trade Center, respectively. The plans for 2, 3, and 4 World Trade Center were announced in September 2006. 2 World Trade Center would be a 78-story, 1,254-foot-tall (382 m) building, rising to a pinnacle with four diamonds. The building would have contained 143,000 ft^{2} (13,300 m^{2}) of retail space in its base; four trading floors; and 2.3×10^{6} ft^{2} (210,000 m^{2}) of offices across 60 stories. The lowest stories of 2 World Trade Center and several neighboring buildings would be part of a rebuilt Westfield World Trade Center Mall.

In Foster and Partners' original design, the structural engineer for the building was WSP Cantor Seinuk. The four diamonds on the roof would have sloped down toward the memorial, indicating the sites of the original towers on the skyline. The tower was designed to resemble a diamond, with cross bracing and indentations breaking up each elevation of the facade. The Port Authority of New York and New Jersey said that Foster's design "incorporates WTC master planner Daniel Libeskind's 'wedge of light' concept, and will cast no shadow on the memorial park on September 11."

=== Initial construction ===
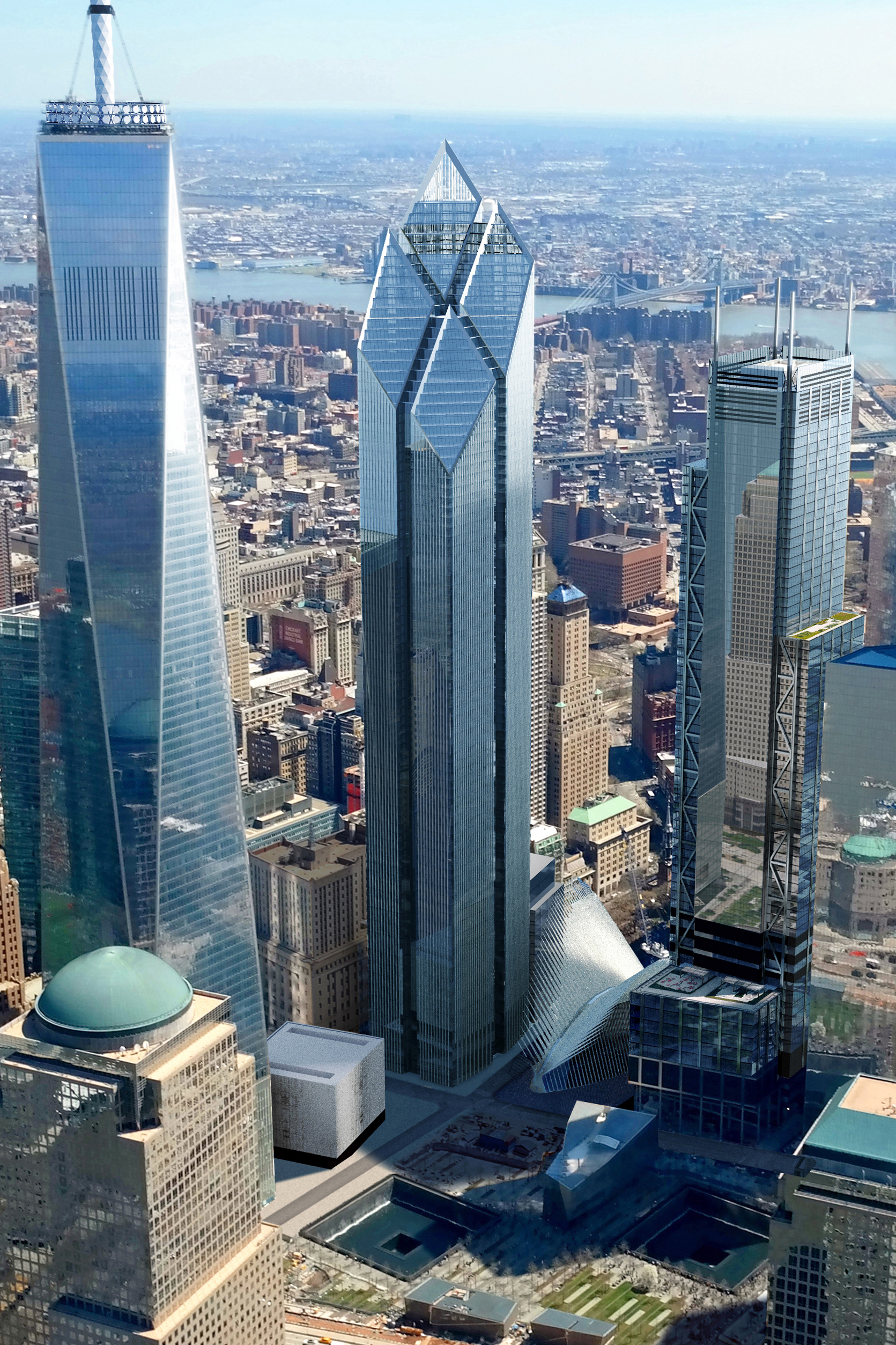
The initial design by Norman Foster featured a diamond-shaped crown that sloped towards the memorial.

Excavation for 200 Greenwich Street commenced in 2008, at which point the building was scheduled to be completed sometime between 2012 and 2016. By May 2009, the Port Authority was seeking to reduce the size of 2 and 3 WTC and postpone the construction of 5 WTC, citing the Great Recession and disagreements with Silverstein. The developer had requested that the Port Authority fund two of the towers, but the agency wanted to take control of the 3 WTC site and was willing to provide funding for only one tower. New York City mayor Michael Bloomberg attempted to mediate the dispute with little success. In July 2009, Silverstein wrote a letter to the development's stakeholders, recommending that the dispute go to arbitration. Silverstein officially requested arbitration the next month. He requested that the Port Authority pay $2.7 billion in damages. An arbitration panel ruled in January 2010 that the agency did not owe him any damages. However, the panel also voided a clause that would have forced Silverstein to hand over the towers to Port Authority if they were not completed by 2014.

As part of the arbitration process, Silverstein requested a $2.6 billion tax-free bond issue for the redevelopment of the World Trade Center site. The New York state government approved the bond issue in December 2009, though the construction of 2 and 3 WTC remained on hold. In February 2010, Silverstein proposed constructing 3 WTC and delaying plans for 2 WTC, a move that was expected to save $262 million in the short term. The next month, the PANYNJ and the city and state governments of New York agreed to fund $600 million for 3 WTC's construction after Silverstein had found tenants for at least 40,000 square feet (3,700 m^{2}) of the space. Silverstein would build the first five stories by 2013 if he were unable to finance the project and lease the office space. PANYNJ board members from New Jersey acquiesced to the deal with Silverstein, but only on the condition that the agency also fund a reconstruction of the Bayonne Bridge.

Tower 2 foundation work began on June 1, 2010, but construction was halted in August 2012. The street-level foundation was finished by November 2012 and construction of everything up to street level was completed in mid-2013. The rest of the building, however, was yet to be built unless tenants for Tower 2 could be found.

=== Bjarke Ingels Group redesign ===
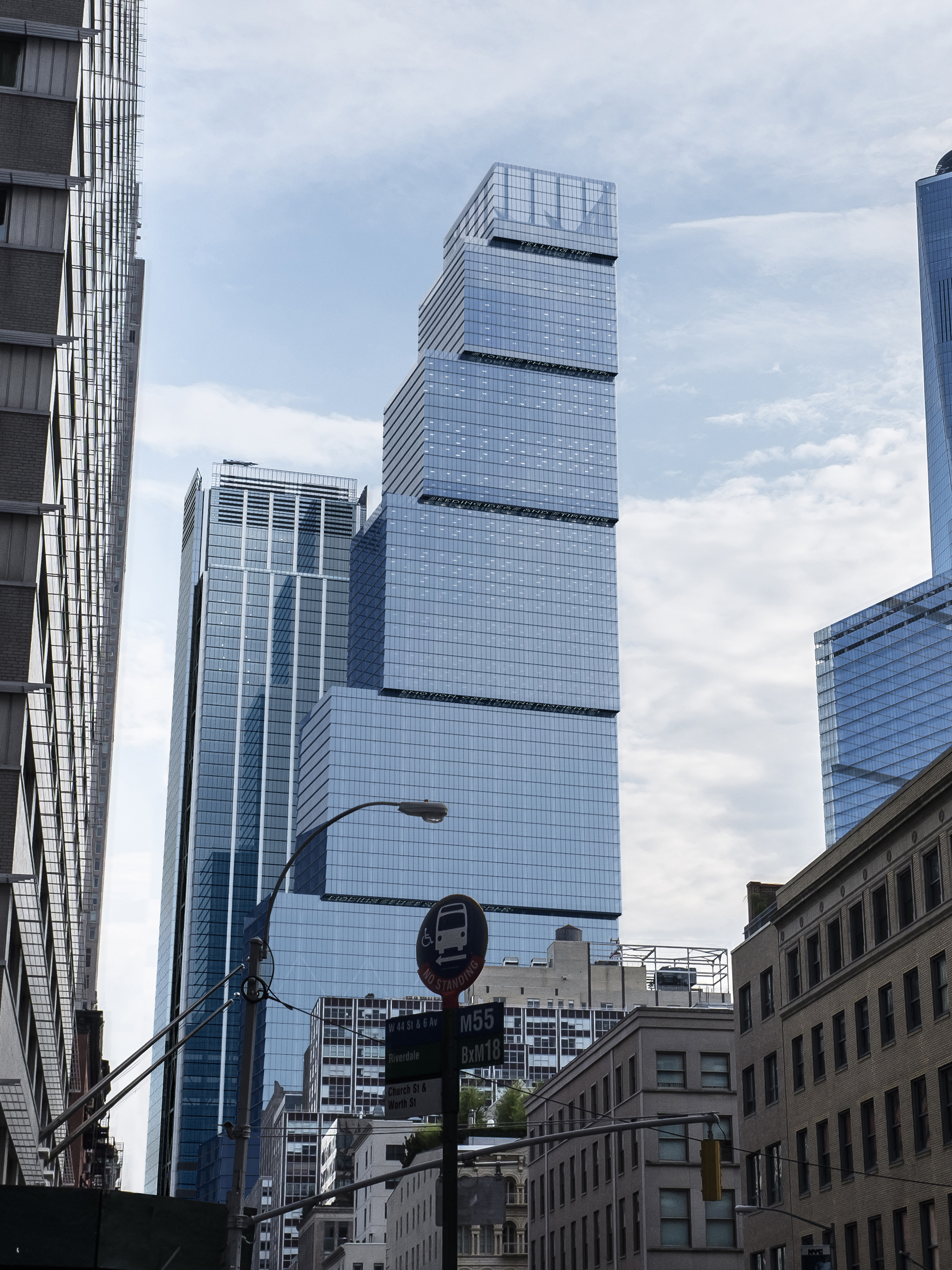
The building's proposed design by Bjarke Ingels Group in 2015

On June 9, 2015, Wired magazine reported that Two World Trade Center would be redesigned by Bjarke Ingels of Bjarke Ingels Group (BIG), and be built by 2020. The bottom half of the new design would have been leased out to 21st Century Fox and News Corp until they decided against leaving their current headquarters.

Bjarke Ingels Group began redesigning 2 World Trade Center in May 2015, upon the requests of the property's developer Silverstein Properties and its possible future media tenants. This design featured a cantilever on the northern elevation and terraces on the eastern elevation. The southern and western elevations rose straight from the ground; the massing appeared to be leaning slightly toward One World Trade Center because of the cantilevering design. In an interview, Bjarke Ingels described the concept of the redesign as such: "Two World Trade is almost like a vertical village of bespoke buildings within the building, that also can be seen as a single tower. It actually has an inclination towards One World Trade Center, so the two towers – even though they're not twinning – by having a mutual relationship, the space between them is parallel, although at an incline." The first three floors of the 2,800,000 square feet (260,000 m^{2}) office building, including the ground level, would have featured about 100,000 square feet (9,300 m^{2}) of retail space.

=== Early negotiations with tenants ===
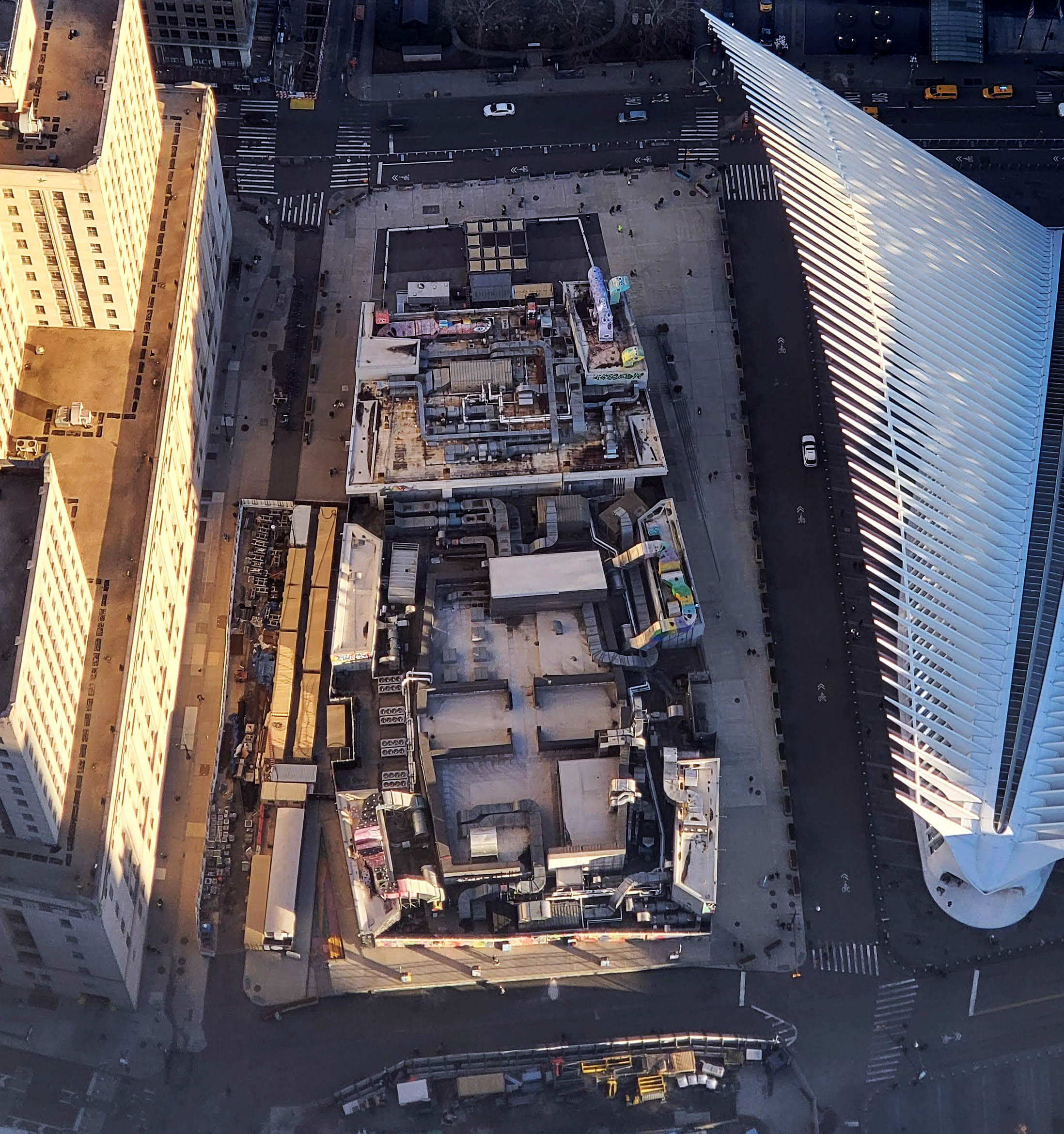
The unfinished construction during 2 World Trade Center's rebuilding in 2023

In 2013, Citigroup had shortlisted the tower as one of three potential locations for its headquarters for when its lease on 399 Park Avenue expired in 2017. The company eventually chose nearby 388 Greenwich Street, however: a building that it already had under lease.

Silverstein has faced considerable difficulty in persuading tenants to lease floor space in Two World Trade Center. Most commonly, businesses ultimately decide against doing so because of the costs of moving in, but others prefer their current locations in Midtown Manhattan despite the leases sometimes being more costly, since Midtown Manhattan offers easier access to the Upper East Side, North Jersey, Long Island, Westchester, and Connecticut. Silverstein has tried to appeal to the Downtown's proximity to nearby Brooklyn, the residence of many technology and media companies' employees. At present, prospective companies either are too large to be housed adequately in 2 World Trade Center (such as Facebook or Google), or conclude it would save money to remain where they are (such as News Corp and Fox Corporation).

Bloomberg Business reported on June 2, 2015, that News Corp and 21st Century Fox, both owned by Rupert Murdoch, had signed a non-binding agreement with the Port Authority of New York and New Jersey to create a joint headquarters at Two World Trade Center. Silverstein said, "A decision by 21st Century Fox and News Corp. to move to the new World Trade Center would cap a seismic shift that has taken place in Lower Manhattan over the past decade. This isn't your grandfather's Wall Street." The change of lead architects, from Norman Foster to Bjarke Ingels, was dependent on the Murdoch companies' relocations to the site; a redesign was deemed necessary given the different requirements for TV studios as opposed to financial companies, the assumed major tenants for the Foster design. Ingels's design would be kept at the same height as Foster's, but it was unclear how the redesign would conflict with the below-grade work already completed, which conformed to the original building design. On January 15, 2016, it was reported that the two companies had decided against moving into 2 World Trade Center, instead keeping their current headquarters on the Avenue of the Americas. They had concluded "given the scale of investment in a relocation of this size, that our resources would be better directed elsewhere."

In September 2017, Deutsche Bank was considering relocating their U.S. headquarters to 2 WTC, signing on as anchor tenant once their lease expires at their current location along nearby 60 Wall Street. However, in May 2018, it was announced the bank was instead relocating to Time Warner Center at Columbus Circle. Larry Silverstein said in a 2019 interview that he was considering building the tower without a signed tenant. He stated, "For all intents and purposes, it wouldn't be a bad idea to start on Tower 2 because it won't be finished until about 2022, 2023."

=== Return to Foster and Partners ===
After the pulling out of News Corp and 21st Century Fox, the future of the site became uncertain, with calls for the tower's design to be reverted to its original incarnation. In a press interview, site developer Larry Silverstein signaled that both the Foster and BIG site plans were under consideration, and that a choice between the two would be made by a future prospective tenant. In February 2019, Silverstein suggested in an interview that construction may soon begin "on spec", or without an anchor tenant, given the strong economy and leasing progress made on neighboring towers. In January 2020, Silverstein announced that he and Norman Foster were working together to update Foster's original design, and that it would be "significantly modified to be more reflective of contemporary needs and taste". Renderings of a revised Foster and Partners design were published in early 2022.

Scale models of the building were publicly revealed in September 2024, although Silverstein was still trying to secure funding for the tower at the time. That month, Silverstein began negotiating with American Express to sign them on as the anchor tenant for 2 WTC. The deal, if finalized, would allow construction of the long-stalled tower to resume. To pay for the tower, Silverstein also requested a loan of nearly $4 billion from the federal government's Railroad Rehabilitation and Improvement Financing program, but he withdrew his loan application in early 2025. In May 2025, the design was refined, shortening the building and adding a spire. But the spire was short-lived as it was removed during late 2025 and in the finalized renderings on February 25, 2026.

=== American Express agreement and resumption of construction ===
Construction of 2 World Trade Center in October 2026

On February 25, 2026, American Express announced it would sign on as the sole tenant of the new 2 World Trade Center. The building was rescheduled to open in 2031. American Express will own the building while leasing the land, and it will not require any public financing for the building. Foster + Partners further revised the design for American Express, drawing up plans for a 55-story tower with landscaped terraces.

Silverstein Properties is leading development of the building, and is Turner Construction responsible for construction for the base of the building. On July 9, 2026, a groundbreaking ceremony was hosted for the tower.

== In popular culture ==
The original diamond-shaped design of the new World Trade Center appeared prominently in several science fiction films set in the future such as Iron Sky, and Oblivion, in the years following 9/11. However, by the early 2010s, uncertainty surrounding the tower's design led to more recent science fiction works such as The Wandering Earth and Westworld depicting a futuristic New York skyline without 2 World Trade Center.

== See also ==
- List of tallest buildings in New York City
