= 3 World Trade Center =

Office skyscraper in Manhattan, New York

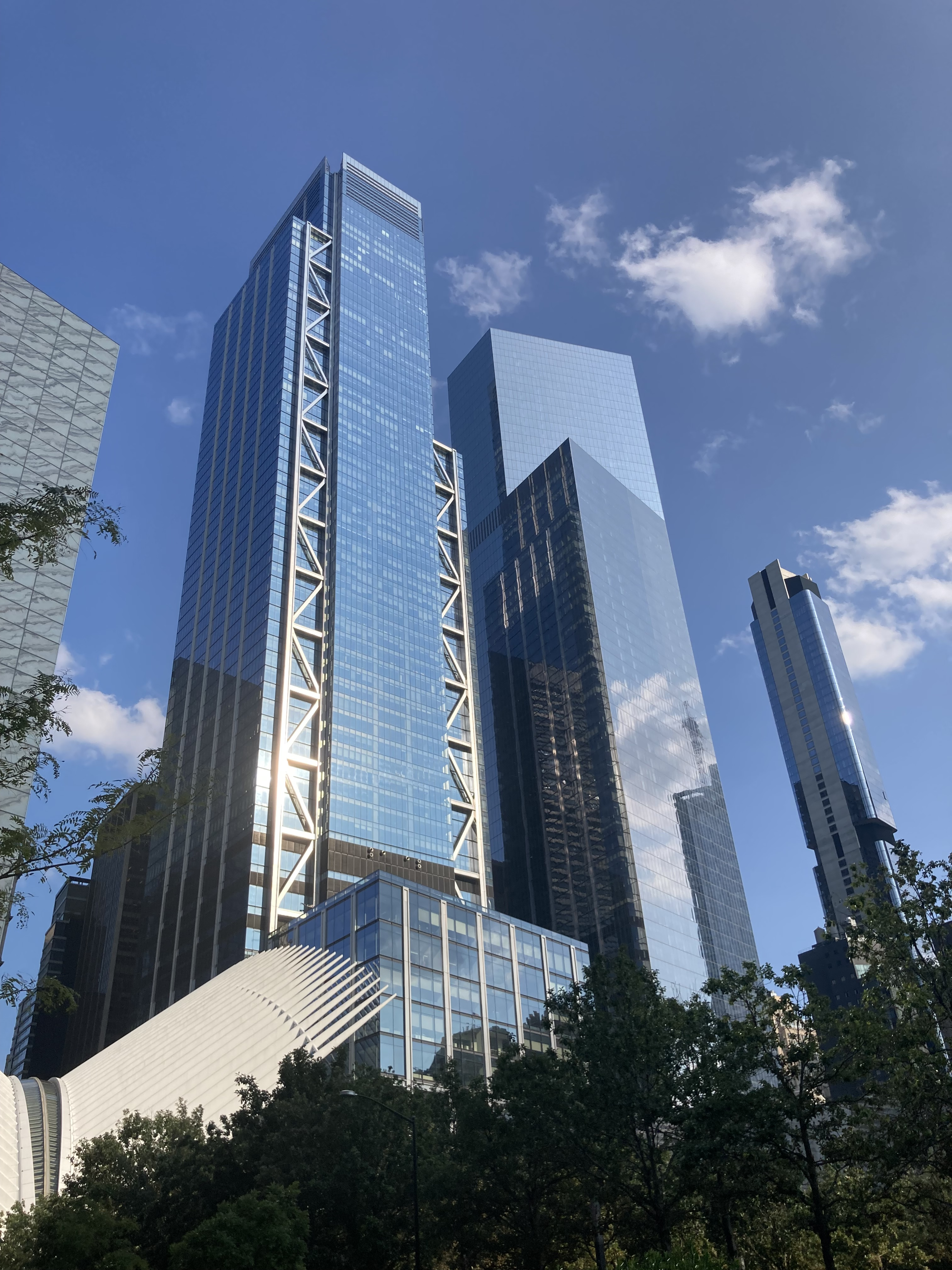
- 3 World Trade Center (left) in August 2026
- Alternative names: 3 WTC; 175 Greenwich Street

General information
- Status: Completed
- Type: Mixed-use: (Office; Retail)
- Architectural style: Modern
- Location: 175 Greenwich Street, Manhattan, New York City 10007
- Coordinates: 40.710923°N 74.011608°W
- Construction started: March 8, 2010
- Completed: 2018
- Opened: June 11, 2018
- Cost: US$2.75 billion
- Owner: Port Authority of New York and New Jersey

Height
- Height: 1,079 ft (329 m)

Technical details
- Floor count: 80
- Floor area: 2,232,984 sq ft (207,451.0 m^{2})
- Lifts/elevators: 53

Design and construction
- Architects: Rogers Stirk Harbour + Partners, AAI Architects, P.C. (as architect of record)
- Developer: Silverstein Properties
- Engineer: Jaros, Baum & Bolles (MEP, Vertical Transportation); Fisher Marantz Stone (Lighting); Permasteelisa Group (Facade)
- Structural engineer: WSP Cantor Seinuk Weidlinger Associates (Peer Review)
- Main contractor: Tishman Construction

3 World Trade Center (3 WTC; also known as 175 Greenwich Street) is a skyscraper constructed as part of the new World Trade Center in Lower Manhattan, New York City. The tower is located on Greenwich Street along the eastern side of the World Trade Center site. The building was designed by Rogers Stirk Harbour + Partners, and is managed by Silverstein Properties through a ground lease with the Port Authority of New York and New Jersey (PANYNJ), the landowner. It is 1,079 ft (329 m) high, with 80 stories. As of 2025, it is the tenth-tallest building in the city.

The current edifice is the second on the World Trade Center site to bear the address 3 World Trade Center. The original building was the Marriott World Trade Center, a 22-story, 825-room hotel located in the southwest corner of the World Trade Center complex. Opened in July 1981 as the Vista International Hotel, it was destroyed during the September 11 attacks in 2001, along with the rest of the World Trade Center.

The current 3 World Trade Center was planned as a skyscraper measuring 1,240 feet (378 m) tall. The building's groundbreaking took place in January 2008, but only the lower stories were built because the skyscraper lacked an anchor tenant. Construction resumed in 2014 after advertising company GroupM was signed on as anchor tenant. The building's concrete core was topped out during August 2016, with the perimeter steel structure following on October 6, 2016. The building opened on June 11, 2018.

== Site ==
3 World Trade Center is at 175 Greenwich Street, within the new World Trade Center (WTC) complex, in the Financial District neighborhood of Lower Manhattan in New York City. The land lot is bounded by Greenwich Street to the west, Dey Street to the north, Church Street to the east, and Cortlandt Way to the south. Within the World Trade Center complex, nearby structures include the National September 11 Memorial & Museum to the west; One World Trade Center to the northwest; World Trade Center Transportation Hub and 2 World Trade Center to the north; and 4 World Trade Center to the south. Outside World Trade Center, nearby buildings include 195 Broadway and the Millennium Hilton New York Downtown hotel to the northeast, as well as One Liberty Plaza to the southeast.

=== Previous buildings ===
For most of the 20th century, the site of 3 WTC was occupied by the Cortlandt Building, built in 1907 and one of two office structures that comprised the Hudson Terminal complex. The site was also abutted by several low-rise buildings on Greenwich Street to the west. During the late 19th and early 20th centuries, the adjoining section of Cortlandt Street had been part of Manhattan's Radio Row, which contained many electronics stores. The Hudson Terminal complex was demolished in 1972, when the original World Trade Center was built.

The Port Authority of New York and New Jersey (PANYNJ), which was responsible for the construction of the World Trade Center, had demolished several streets to make way for the towers within the World Trade Center, including parts of Cortlandt, Dey, and Greenwich Streets. The site of the current skyscraper was occupied by 5 World Trade Center at the northeast corner of the World Trade Center site. Terrorists destroyed the World Trade Center during the September 11 attacks. Greenwich Street was restored as part of the redevelopment of the World Trade Center, and the block of Cortlandt Street next to 3 WTC was rebuilt as a pedestrian walkway. The intersection of Cortlandt Way and Greenwich Street reopened in 2014, improving access to the National September 11 Memorial.

The 3 World Trade Center address was originally used by the Marriott World Trade Center (originally the Vista International Hotel), a 22-story hotel building with 825 rooms. The Vista Hotel was on the western side of the World Trade Center, near the intersection of West Street and Liberty Street. Construction began in 1979, and it opened on July 1, 1981. The hotel was heavily damaged in the 1993 World Trade Center bombing and reopened in 1994 after repairs. The Host Marriott Corporation acquired the hotel in 1995 for $141.5 million. Forty people in the hotel died when the complex was destroyed during the September 11 attacks. Marriott, which held a long-term lease on the hotel site, surrendered its lease in 2003, allowing the National September 11 Memorial & Museum to be built there.

== History ==
=== Site redevelopment ===
3 World Trade Center's design as originally revealed in September 2006, with expressed cross-bracing and four spires.

Larry Silverstein had leased the original World Trade Center from the PANYNJ in July 2001. His company Silverstein Properties continued to pay rent on the site even after the September 11 attacks. In the months following the attacks, architects and urban planning experts held meetings and forums to discuss ideas for rebuilding the site. The architect Daniel Libeskind won a competition to design the master plan for the new World Trade Center in February 2003. The master plan included five towers, a 9/11 memorial, and a transportation hub. By July 2004, two towers were planned on the southeast corner of the site: the 62-story 3 World Trade Center and the 58-story 4 World Trade Center. The plans were delayed due to disputes over who would redevelop the five towers. The PANYNJ and Silverstein ultimately reached an agreement in 2006. Silverstein Properties ceded the rights to develop 1 and 5 WTC in exchange for financing with Liberty Bonds for 2, 3, and 4 WTC.

British architect Richard Rogers of Rogers Stirk Harbour + Partners was hired to design the new 3 World Trade Center, on the eastern part of the World Trade Center site at 175 Greenwich Street, in May 2006. Additionally, Norman Foster and Fumihiko Maki were selected as the architects for 2 and 4 World Trade Center, respectively. The plans for 2, 3, and 4 World Trade Center were announced in September 2006. 3 World Trade Center would be a 71-story, 1,155-foot-tall (352 m) building with diagonal bracing on its facade for structural reinforcement. The tentative plans also called for four spires, one at each corner, rising 100 feet (30 m) above the flat roof. The building would have contained 133,000 ft^{2} (12,400 m^{2}) of retail space in its base; five trading floors; and 2.1×10^{6} ft^{2} (200,000 m^{2}) of offices across 54 stories. The lowest stories of 3 World Trade Center and several neighboring buildings would be part of a rebuilt Westfield World Trade Center Mall.

As part of the project, Cortlandt Street (which had been closed to make way for the original World Trade Center) was planned to be rebuilt between 3 and 4 WTC. The plans for Cortlandt Street affected the design of the lower stories of both 3 and 4 WTC, as one of the proposals called for an enclosed shopping atrium along the path of Cortlandt Street, connecting the two buildings. The street was eventually rebuilt as an outdoor path. Final designs for 2, 3, and 4 WTC were announced in September 2007. The three buildings would comprise the commercial eastern portion of the new World Trade Center, contrasting with the memorial in the complex's western section. At the time, construction of 3 WTC was planned to begin in January 2008. As part of its agreement with the PANYNJ, Silverstein Properties was obliged to complete 3 and 4 WTC by the end of 2011.

=== Construction ===
==== Initial construction and disputes ====
Preliminary site plans for the World Trade Center rebuild

In 2007, the PANYNJ started constructing the East Bathtub, a 6.7-acre (2.7 ha) site that was to form the foundations of 3 and 4 WTC. The process involved excavating a trench around the site to a depth of 70 feet (21 m), then constructing a slurry wall around the site. The PANYNJ was supposed to give the site to Silverstein Properties at the end of 2007; the contractors would have received a $10 million bonus if they had completed the work early. If Silverstein did not receive the site by January 1, 2008, the PANYNJ would pay Silverstein $300,000 per day until the site was transferred. The agency ultimately gave the site to Silverstein on February 17, 2008. The PANYNJ paid a $14.4 million penalty for turning over the site 48 days after the deadline.

Merrill expressed interest in relocating its headquarters to 3 World Trade Center in mid-2008. Following this, the PANYNJ voted to extend the deadline for the building's completion to June 2012. Merrill had been the first private firm to show interest in leasing significant amounts of space at the World Trade Center, and the announcement raised the possibility that 3 WTC could be redesigned for Merrill's use. The PANYNJ offered to lease the underlying land to Merrill for $510 million, 25% lower than the agency's original asking price for the land, and Silverstein offered to sell his stake in the project for $340 million. Merrill balked at Silverstein's offer, and it withdrew from the project in July 2008 after failing to secure a lease on favorable terms. Merrill's withdrawal came shortly after the PANYNJ had announced that the World Trade Center redevelopment would be delayed significantly. Meanwhile, police officials expressed concern that the building's all-glass design posed a security risk. A study published in early 2009 predicted that 3 WTC would not be fully occupied until 2037, due to the 2008 financial crisis.

By May 2009, the PANYNJ was seeking to reduce the size of 2 and 3 WTC and postpone the construction of 5 WTC, citing the Great Recession and disagreements with Silverstein. The developer had requested that the PANYNJ fund two of the towers, but the agency wanted to take control of the 3 WTC site and was willing to provide funding for only one tower. The PANYNJ wanted to build 3 WTC only to the fourth story, allowing Silverstein to construct a hotel or office building above when market conditions improved. New York City mayor Michael Bloomberg attempted to mediate the dispute with little success. In July 2009, Silverstein wrote a letter to the development's stakeholders, recommending that the dispute go to arbitration. Silverstein officially requested arbitration the next month. He requested that the PANYNJ pay $2.7 billion in damages. An arbitration panel ruled in January 2010 that the agency did not owe him any damages. However, the panel also voided a clause that would have forced Silverstein to hand over the towers to PANYNJ if they were not completed by 2014. The panel gave Silverstein and the PANYNJ two months to reach an agreement.

As part of the arbitration process, Silverstein requested a $2.6 billion tax-free bond issue for the redevelopment of the World Trade Center site. The New York state government approved the bond issue in December 2009, though the construction of 2 and 3 WTC remained on hold. In February 2010, Silverstein proposed constructing 3 WTC and delaying plans for 2 WTC, a move that was expected to save $262 million in the short term. The next month, the PANYNJ and the city and state governments of New York agreed to fund $600 million for 3 WTC's construction after Silverstein had found tenants for at least 40,000 square feet (3,700 m^{2}) of the space. Silverstein would build the first five stories by 2013 if he were unable to finance the project and lease the office space. PANYNJ board members from New Jersey acquiesced to the deal with Silverstein, but only on the condition that the agency also fund a reconstruction of the Bayonne Bridge.

Three PureCell fuel cells were delivered at the World Trade Center site in November 2010, providing about 30 percent of 3 WTC's power. In the meantime, the 1,137-foot (347 m) tower had been delayed indefinitely. The investment bank UBS was considering leasing space at 3 WTC in mid-2011 but ultimately decided against it. At the time, although the complex was originally supposed to have been anchored by large financial firms, these companies were generally no longer seeking to expand their space.

==== Funding compromise and anchor tenant ====
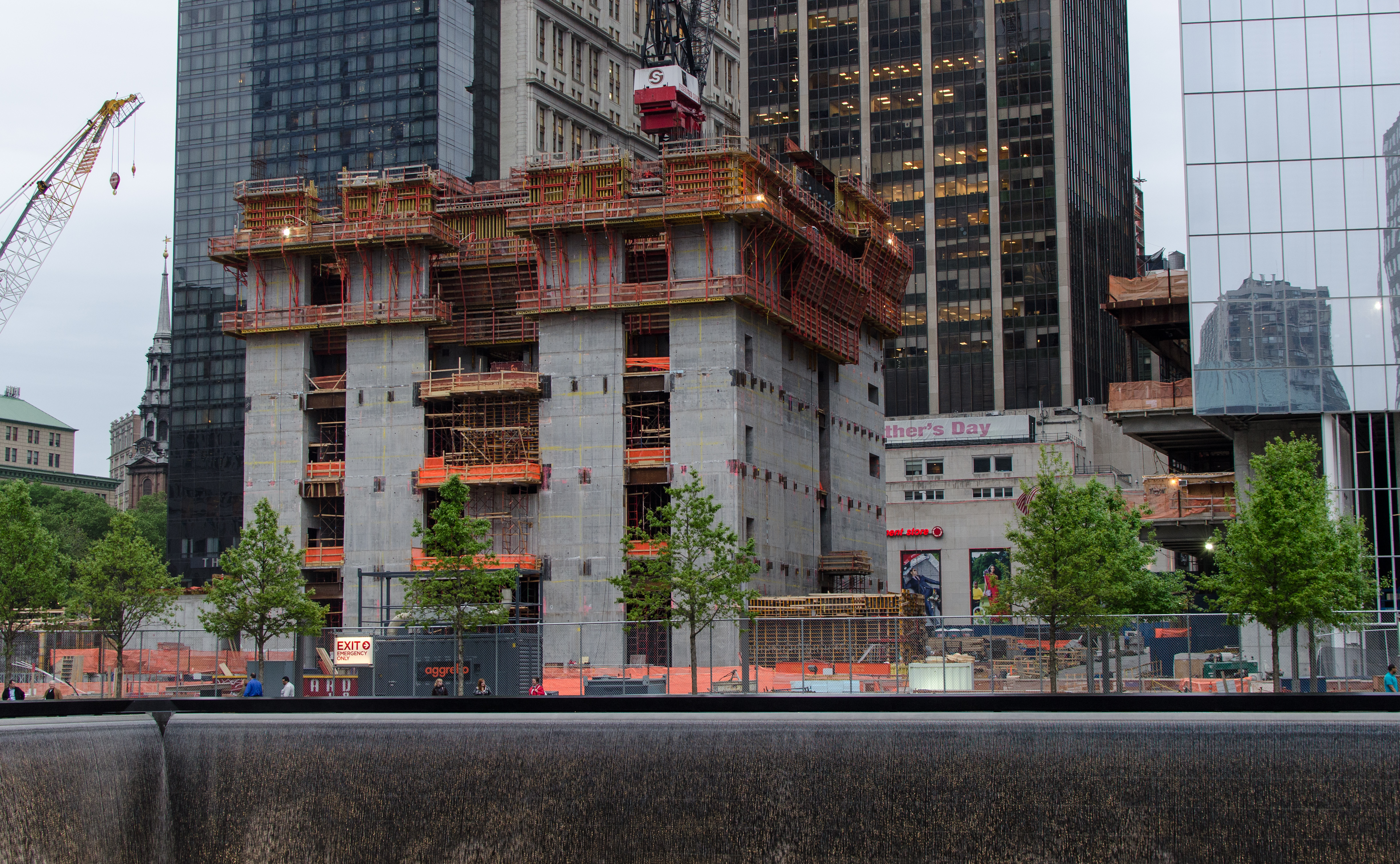
Construction of Three World Trade Center as of May 2012. A portion of the National 9/11 Memorial's South Pool can be seen in the foreground.

Silverstein Properties and the PANYNJ agreed in early 2012 to complete only the first seven stories of 3 WTC unless tenants could be found by the end of the year. The base had been built entirely with insurance proceeds, and the tower stories would only be built after Silverstein met the requirements. By that February, the ground floor concrete was almost done and the lower podium had reached the 5th floor; the podium was then planned to be completed in September 2012. Owen Steel's president David Zalesne announced in June 2012 that his company had been selected to provide the structural steel for the building. The next month, the concrete core had reached the 8th floor, and all concrete work had halted. Media conglomerate Viacom and financial firm Citigroup had both declined to relocate to 3 WTC. The lower podium was completed by November 2012. If Silverstein were unable to finalize a lease by the end of 2013, he would have been required to build a semi-permanent roof above the 7th story.

By late 2012, advertising company GroupM was negotiating to lease 550,000 square feet (51,000 m^{2}) at 3 WTC, and law firm White & Case was looking for about 500,000 square feet (46,000 m^{2}). Either of these deals would be large enough to qualify the project for up to $600 million in public benefits. GroupM signed a letter of intent for the building in mid-2013, and the company finalized its lease that December, taking 500,000 square feet (46,000 m^{2}). The following month, U.S. senator Chuck Schumer obtained $340 million in federal Recovery Zone bonds to finance the project's construction.

Silverstein asked the city, state, and PANYNJ in 2014 to refinance the project on terms that were more favorable to him. In exchange, he would contribute a greater share of private capital. The PANYNJ postponed a vote on whether to guarantee $1.2 billion of construction loans in March 2014, and the vote was delayed again that April. Although PANYNJ chairman Scott Rechler supported the subsidy, other PANYNJ board members said the guarantee was wasteful because the majority of the proposed building still did not have tenant commitments. The PANYNJ voted against guaranteeing the construction loans in May 2014, but the PANYNJ and Silverstein reached a financing agreement the next month. The large amount of unleased space made it difficult for Silverstein to sell bonds to private investors, so the building was instead mainly funded by the sale of $1.6 billion of tax-exempt bonds, the largest-ever unrated bond deal in the municipal bond market. Other sources of funding included $600 million in insurance proceeds, $210 million in cash from the city and state governments of New York, and $55 million in cash from Silverstein Properties. Silverstein sold the municipal bonds at the end of October 2014.

==== Resumption of construction ====
Following the financing agreement, the tower crane returned, and the PANYNJ and Silverstein announced that the building would be completed by 2017. Unusual for a high-rise, the building's concrete core was built before the rest of the structure was completed. Fintech company Fundrise sold $5 million of the building's municipal bonds to private investors in January 2015. Work above the second story had begun by the next month. That June, the architects eliminated the planned rooftop masts, reduced the building to its final height of 1,079 feet (329 m). Nonetheless, by August 2015, the building had reached half of its final height. The construction process was complicated by the fact that water started leaking into the construction site in late 2015, delaying the opening of the adjacent Westfield World Trade Center mall. The site was completely exposed to the outdoors, and workers were constantly spraying water onto the building's concrete to decrease dust levels, both of which caused water to seep into the building.

On May 20, 2016, the tower's concrete core reached the symbolic height of 1,000 feet (300 m), thus officially reaching supertall status and exceeding the roof height of neighboring 4 World Trade Center. 3 World Trade Center's core was topped out one month later on June 23, 2016. In a ceremony held at the base of the building, a 2-ton bucket of concrete was signed by workers, and executives, including developer Larry Silverstein, and was hoisted up with an American flag, which was also used with the topping out of 7 and 4 World Trade Center, to the top of the tower.

On the evening of August 11, 2016, a construction crane struck one of 3 World Trade Center's windows. There was a heavy wind gust at the time, and construction workers were securing the crane when it veered into a 12th-story glass panel, cracking it. No one was injured. On October 6, 2016, the entire building was topped out when the last steel beam was lifted and installed on top. The glass facade was completed in August 2017, at which point several retailers had signed leases for the atrium retail space.

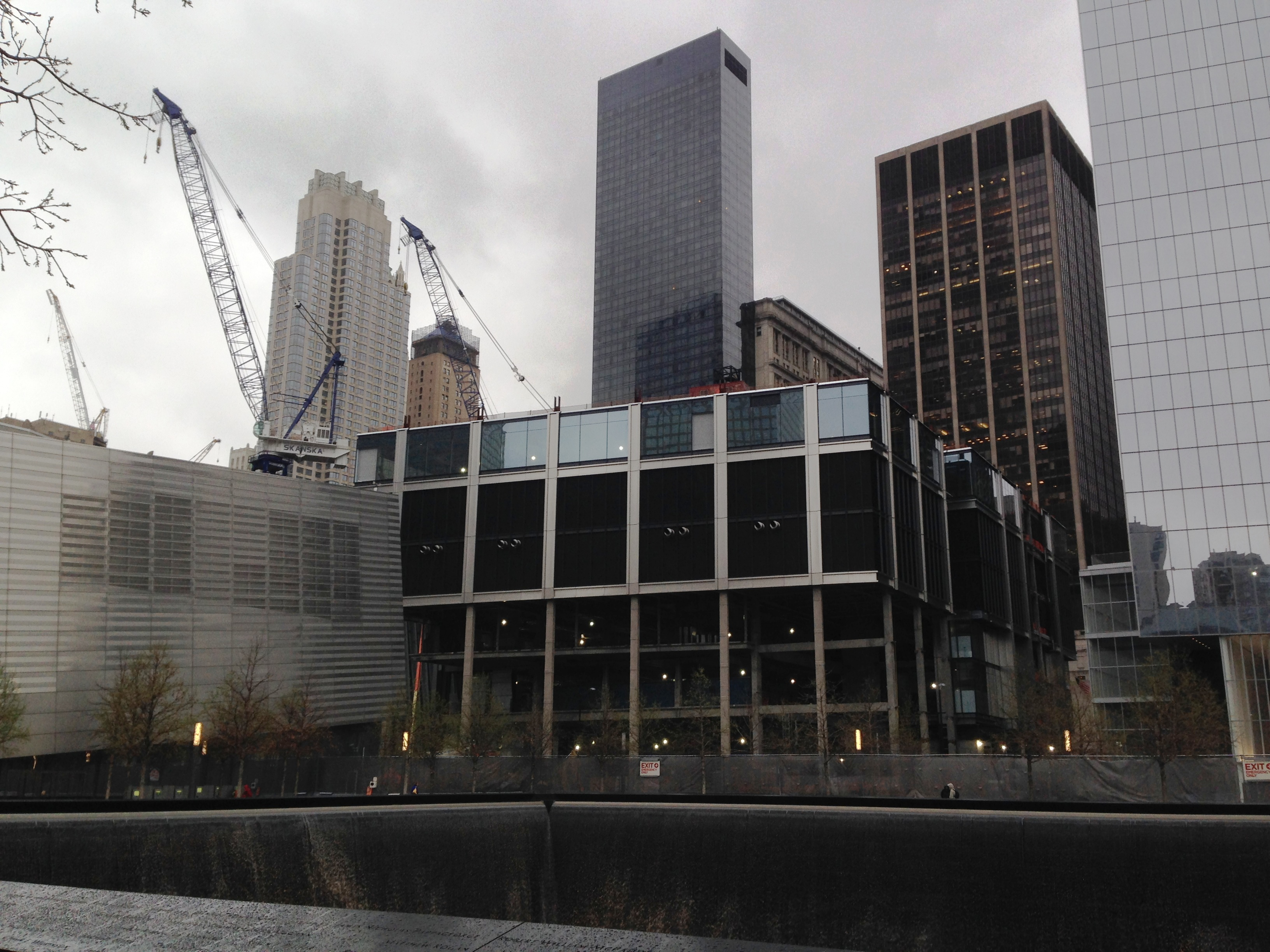
Construction of 3 World Trade Center as of April 2014

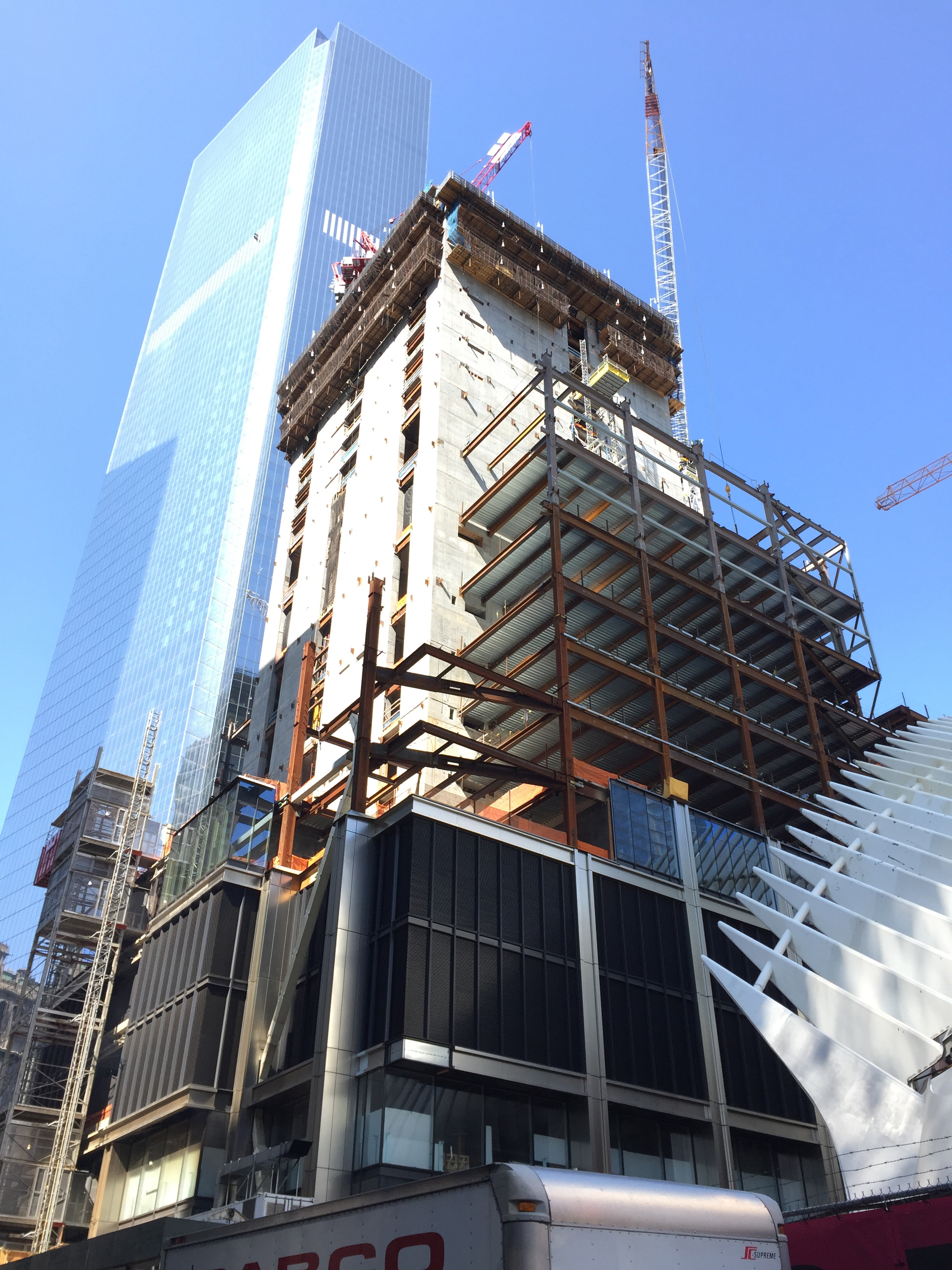
3 World Trade Center under construction on June 10, 2015. The PATH station is visible to the right.

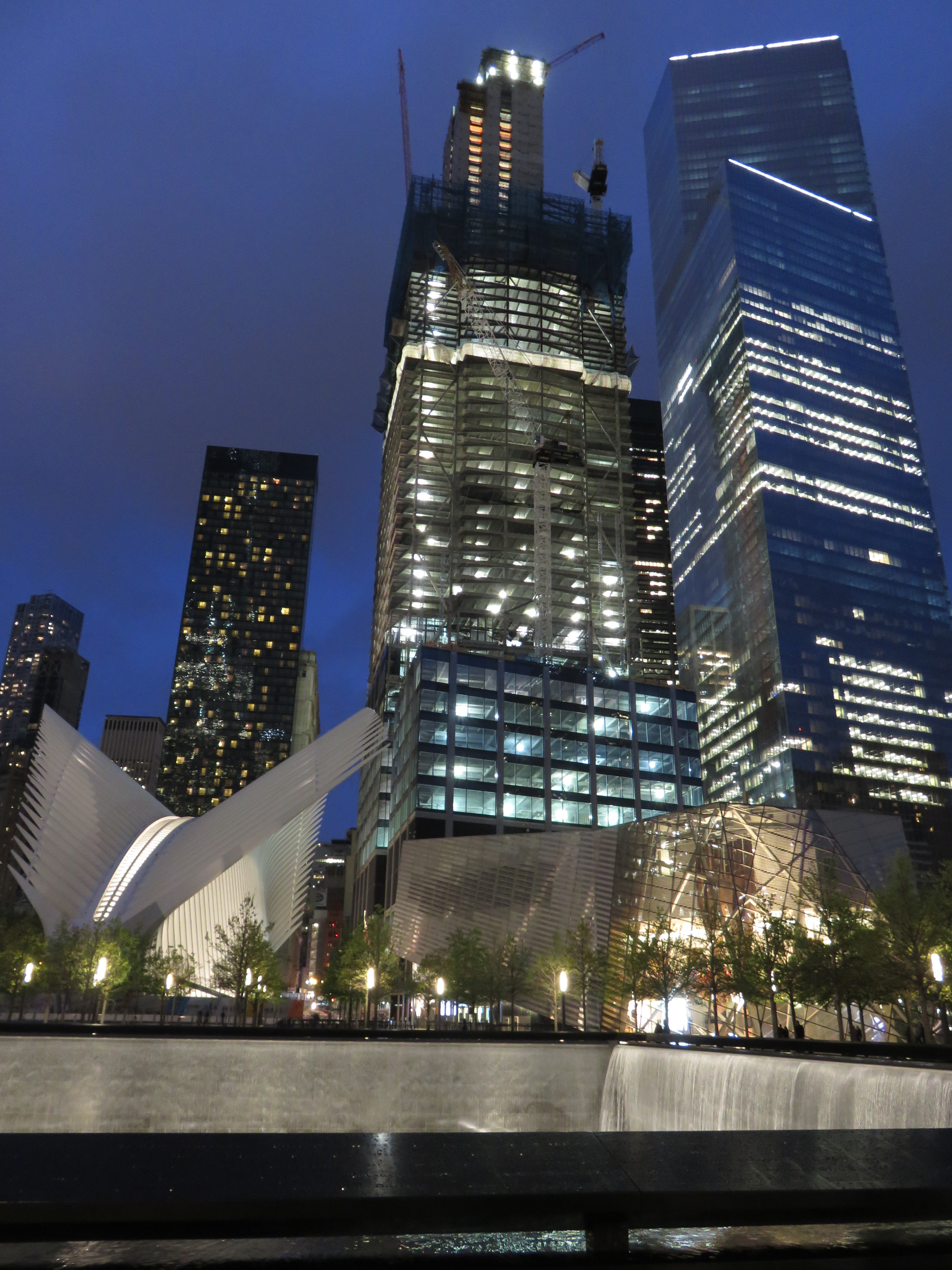
The PATH Station, 3, and 4 World Trade Center at night in May 2016

Developer Larry Silverstein and construction workers sign the last bucket of concrete during the topping-off ceremony on June 23, 2016.

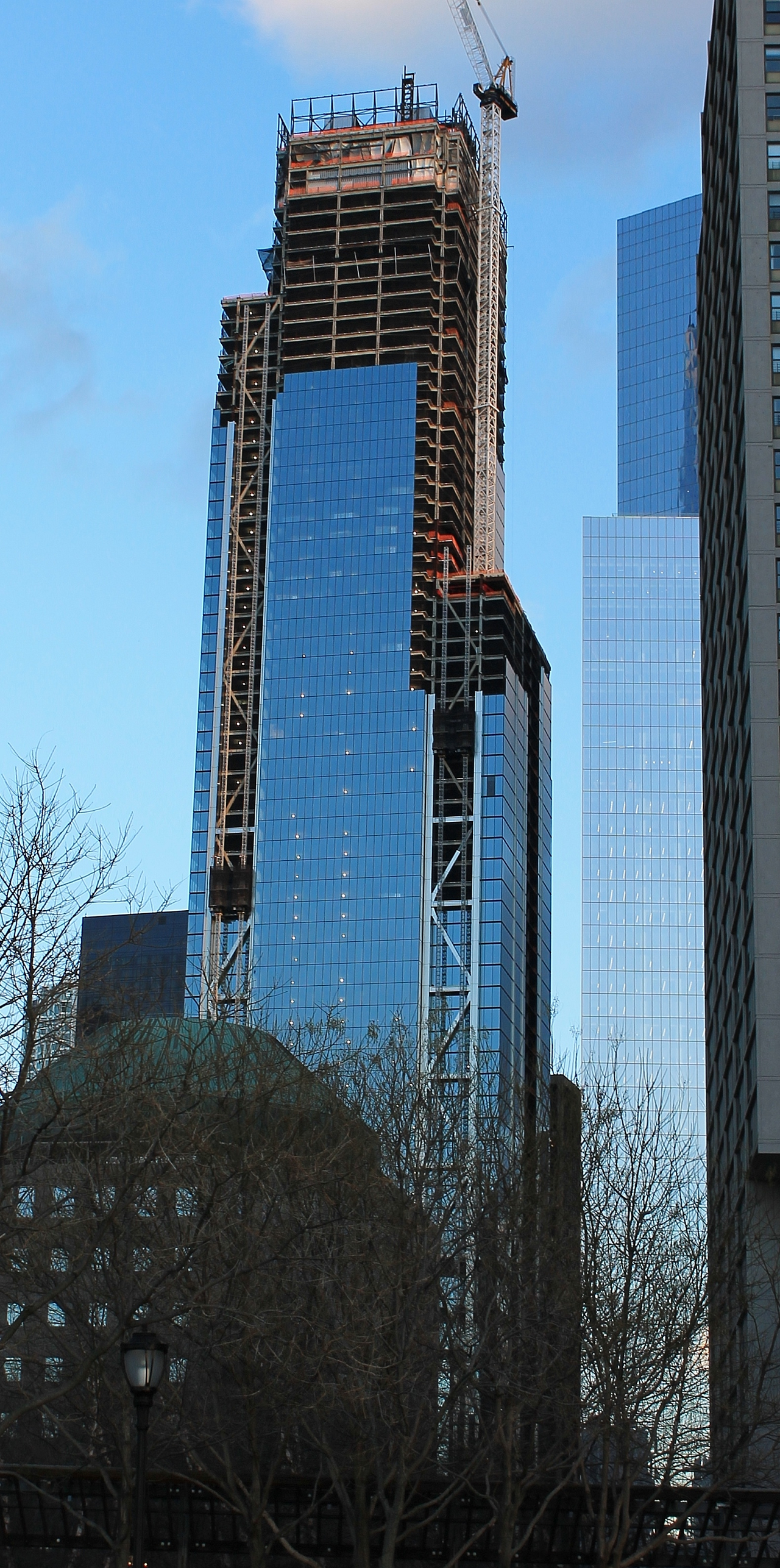
3 World Trade Center under construction on January 26, 2017

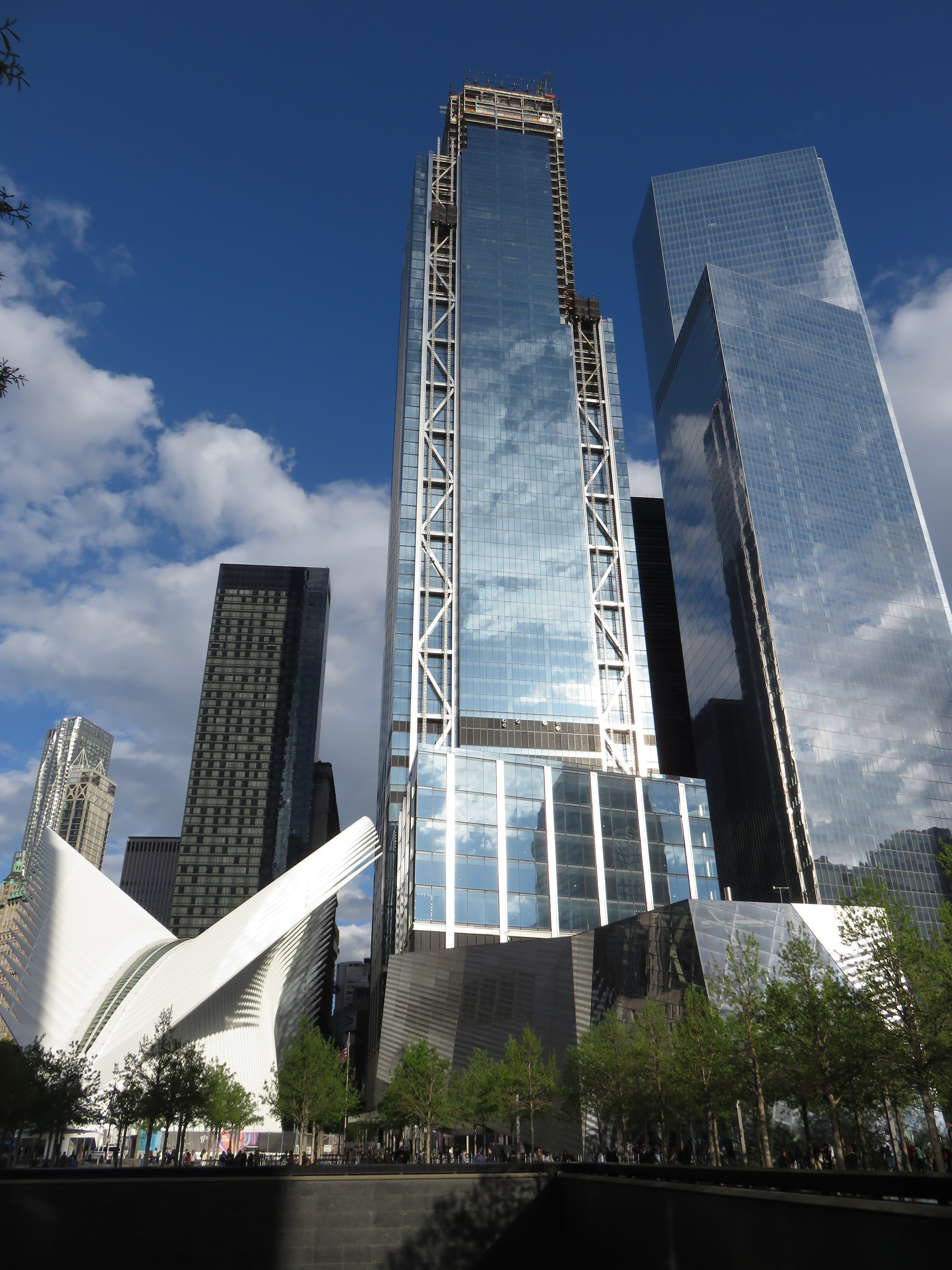
3 World Trade Center under construction on May 8, 2017

=== Opening and early years ===
3 WTC's anchor tenant GroupM had expanded its space to 700,000 square feet (65,000 m^{2}) in January 2016, and GroupM hired the architectural firm to redesign 15 floors in the building for its nine constituent companies. The stock exchange platform IEX leased 45,000 ft^{2} (4,200 m^{2}) in the building in April 2018. This was followed the next month by global consulting company McKinsey & Company, which leased 186,000 square feet (17,300 m^{2}). The building officially opened on June 11, 2018. At the time, the building was 38 percent occupied.

In the first three months of 2019, Silverstein leased space to Hudson River Trading, Casper Sleep, beverage firm Diageo, technology startup Asana Inc., and mortgage lender Better.com. These five leases totaled 355,000 square feet (33,000 m^{2}). Later that year, ridesharing company Uber leased more than 300,000 square feet (28,000 m^{2}), and law firms Kelley Drye & Warren and Cozen O'Connor also leased space there. Private equity firm Blue Wolf Capital Partners leased space in early 2020, and Uber sought to sublease some of its space by the end of that year. Casper subleased some of its space to advertising company Index Exchange in 2021. In addition, the law firm Freshfields Bruckhaus Deringer leased four stories at 3 WTC in August 2022.

== Architecture ==
3 World Trade Center was designed by Richard Rogers of Rogers Stirk Harbour + Partners. The structural engineer for the building was WSP Global. It is 1,079 feet (329 m) tall with 80 above-ground stories. The lowest 17 stories of the tower comprise a podium. There are five stories of retail, spanning the basement and sub-basement levels as well as the first three above-ground stories.

=== Facade ===
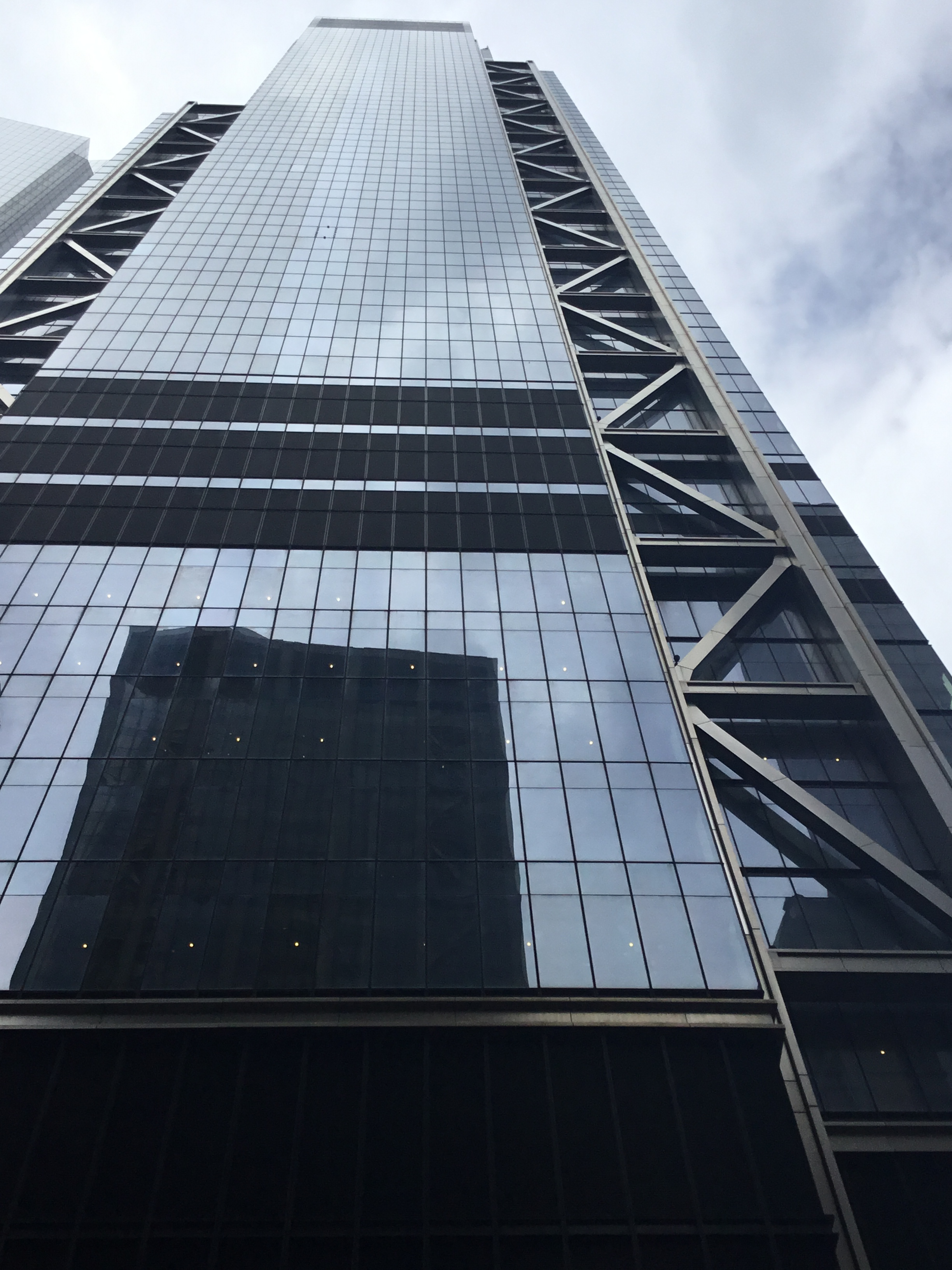
K-bracing on the tower's facade

The facade is composed of double-glazed, low emissivity glass panels. Most of the facade is a curtain wall with 10,000 panels of annealed glass, which are more resistant to shattering compared with traditional glass panels. The curtain wall panels span from the floor to the ceiling on each story. They measure 13.5 feet (4.1 m) high on each of the podium stories and 24 feet (7.3 m) high on each of the tower stories. At the base of the building, a cable-net wall surrounds the lobby on three sides. The cable-net wall is composed of panels measuring 5 feet (1.5 m) wide and 10 feet (3.0 m) tall.

The eastern and western elevations of the facade contain K-shaped bracing, which is composed of diagonal beams clad in stainless steel. The diagonal beams reinforce the superstructure and remove the need for structural columns at the corner. The stainless steel cladding is used to protect the beams from weathering, and it was also intended to complement the glass panels on the facade. The roof of the building is flat, though originally it was planned with several spires.

=== Features ===
3 World Trade Center covers 2.5 million square feet (230,000 m^{2}) in total. Each of the building's stories spans 30,000 to 70,000 square feet (2,800 to 6,500 m^{2}). The building uses 27,000 short tons (24,000 long tons; 24,000 t) of steel and 145,000 cubic yards (111,000 m^{3}) of concrete. 3 WTC also includes 44 passenger elevators and five service elevators. Four of the service elevators are also specifically designed to be used for emergency evacuations. Eight of the passenger elevators serve the first 17 stories exclusively, and there are two passenger and two service elevators within the retail section of the building. There are also four staircases within the podium and two staircases within the upper stories.

==== Lobby and retail ====
There are nine entrances to 3 WTC's lobby. The floor of the lobby is made of Sardinian gray granite. The western wall of the lobby is made of Zimbabwe black granite and measures 43 feet (13 m) high. The walls of the elevator banks contain glass panels with a metallic mesh embedded into them. There are also LED wall panels next to the elevators themselves. The lobby's ceiling measures up to 62 feet (19 m) high, though it slopes down to as low as 22 feet (6.7 m). The ceiling is made of a stretched material, behind which are LED lights; at the time of 3 WTC's opening, this was the largest stretched ceiling in the world.

One wall of the lobby contains Joystick, a 46-foot-wide (14 m) mural by James Rosenquist, which was originally painted in 2002 and reinstalled at 3 WTC in 2020. Untitled (Fish on Fire, Greenwich Street) 2024, a copper sculpture by Frank Gehry, has been mounted in the lobby of 3 WTC since 2025. The sculpture, measuring 20 by 7 feet (6.1 by 2.1 m) across, can rotate and is illuminated from inside.

The rest of the ground, second, and third stories are used as retail space. There are two basement levels, which also contain retail and are part of Westfield World Trade Center mall. The five retail stories are connected by two passenger elevators and four staircases. The mall connects to the World Trade Center Transportation Hub, which in turn links with the New York City Subway and PATH trains.

==== Upper stories ====
The building has ceiling heights ranging from 13 to 24 feet (4.0 to 7.3 m). There are terraces wrapping around 3 World Trade Center on floors 17, 60, and 76. The terrace on floor 17 is 205 feet (62 m) high and is divided into two sections, each measuring 5,500 square feet (510 m^{2}). One of the terraces on floor 17 is shared by all of the building's tenants, while the other is a private terrace. The terrace on floor 17 was originally designed as a mechanical area with space for financial companies' equipment, but this was scrapped when GroupM became the building's anchor tenant. The terrace on floor 60 is 718 feet (219 m) high, while that on floor 76 is 934 feet (285 m) high.

The air-conditioning systems on each story are controlled separately, thus reducing energy consumption. In addition, the building's filtration systems are able to extract 95 percent of particulates, in addition to ozone and volatile organic compounds. The building contains air intake openings on its upper stories, since the air on higher stories was supposed to be cleaner than the air near ground level. Jaros, Baum & Bolles installed the mechanical, electrical, and plumbing system.

== Critical reception ==
When 3 WTC was completed in 2018, James Gardner of The Real Deal New York wrote: "I can say with reasonable confidence that it will prove to be the least architecturally interesting of the four main buildings on the hallowed site." In particular, Gardner criticized "the arbitrary asymmetries, the industrial aesthetic in one part but not another, the shift in cladding patterns" in the design.

== See also ==
- Buildings and architecture of New York City
- List of tallest buildings in New York City
- Tallest buildings in the United States
