= 4 World Trade Center (1975–2001) =

Former building in Manhattan, New York

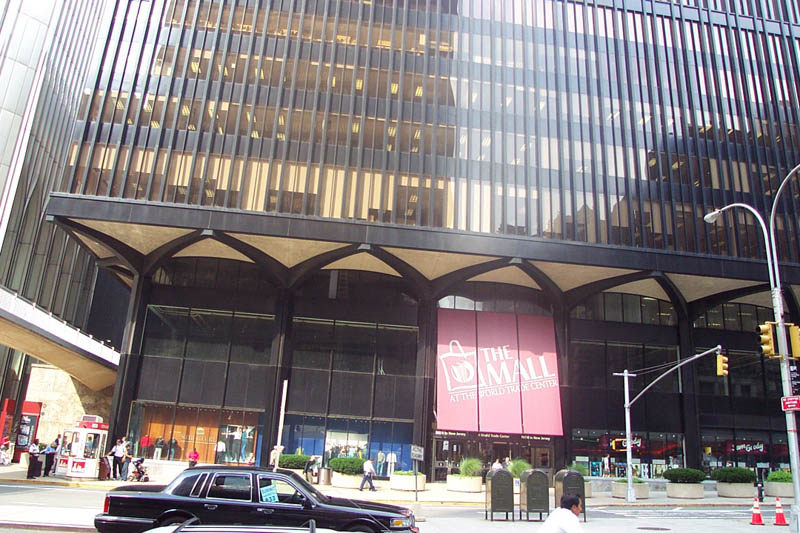
- The southwest corner of the original 4 World Trade Center, as seen from Liberty Street on August 21, 2001, also showing The Mall at the World Trade Center entrance. 2 World Trade Center can be seen on the far left.
- Alternative names: 4 WTC; WTC 4; Building 4

General information
- Status: Demolished
- Type: Office
- Architectural style: Modern
- Location: Lower Manhattan, New York City, United States
- Coordinates: 40°42′38″N 74°0′45″W
- Current tenants: List
- Construction started: c. 1972
- Completed: 1975
- Opened: January 1977
- Demolished: After September 2001 (heavily damaged on September 11, 2001)
- Owner: Port Authority of New York and New Jersey

Height
- Height: 118 ft (36 m)

Technical details
- Floor count: 9

Design and construction
- Architects: Yamasaki & Associates; Emery Roth & Sons

The original 4 World Trade Center (4 WTC), also known as the Southeast Plaza Building, was a nine-story, 118 ft (36 m)-tall building at the southeast corner of the World Trade Center complex in Lower Manhattan, New York City. Completed in 1975, the building was designed by Minoru Yamasaki and Emery Roth & Sons. On September 11, 2001, the building was heavily damaged as a result of attacks carried out by the Islamic terrorist group al-Qaeda, and was later demolished. Its site is now the location of 3 World Trade Center and the new 4 World Trade Center.

== History ==
4 World Trade Center was built on the site of the Hudson Terminal complex. Construction began in late 1972 after Hudson Terminal was demolished. The building and its portion of The Mall at the World Trade Center was completed in 1975. The first tenants, the Commodities Exchange Center, started to move into the building in January 1977. On July 1, 1977, the Mercantile Traders finalized the move. The building's major tenants were Deutsche Bank (Floor 4, 5, and 6) and the New York Board of Trade (Floors 7, 8, and 9). The building's side facing Liberty Street housed the street-level entrance to The Mall at the World Trade Center on the basement concourse level of the WTC.

4 World Trade Center was home to commodities exchanges on what was at the time one of the world's largest trading floors (featured in the Eddie Murphy movie Trading Places). These commodities exchanges collectively had 12 trading pits.

=== Destruction ===
The Twin Towers of the World Trade Center were destroyed during the September 11 attacks, creating debris that destroyed or severely damaged nearby buildings, such as the original 4 World Trade Center. Much of the southern two-thirds of the building was destroyed, and the remaining north portion virtually destroyed, as a result of the collapse of the South Tower. The structure was subsequently demolished to make way for reconstruction.

At the time of the September 11 attacks, the building's commodities exchanges had 30.2 million ounces (860,000,000 g) of silver coins and 379,036 ounces (10,745,500 g) of gold coins in the basement. The coins in the basement were worth an estimated $200 million. Much of the coins had been removed by November 2001; trucks transported the coins out of the basement through an intact but abandoned section of the Downtown Hudson Tubes. Many coins belonging to the Bank of Nova Scotia were purchased in 2002, repackaged by the Professional Coin Grading Service, and resold to collectors.

== Tenants ==
The following tenants had space at 4 World Trade Center at the time of the attacks:

Tenant	Square Feet Leased	Floors Occupied	Industry	Notes
Deutsche Bank	273,991	4–6	Financial Institutions	
New York Board of Trade	125,000	7–9	Government	
Overseas-Chinese Banking Corp.	6,516	7	Financial Institutions	
Green Coffee Association	7,500	5	Personal Services	
Gelderman, Inc.	4,000	7	Personal Services	
Tony May's Gemelli Restaurant & Bar	10,000	0	Retailers/Wholesalers	

== Gallery ==
Former site plan, with original 4 World Trade Center at the southeast corner.

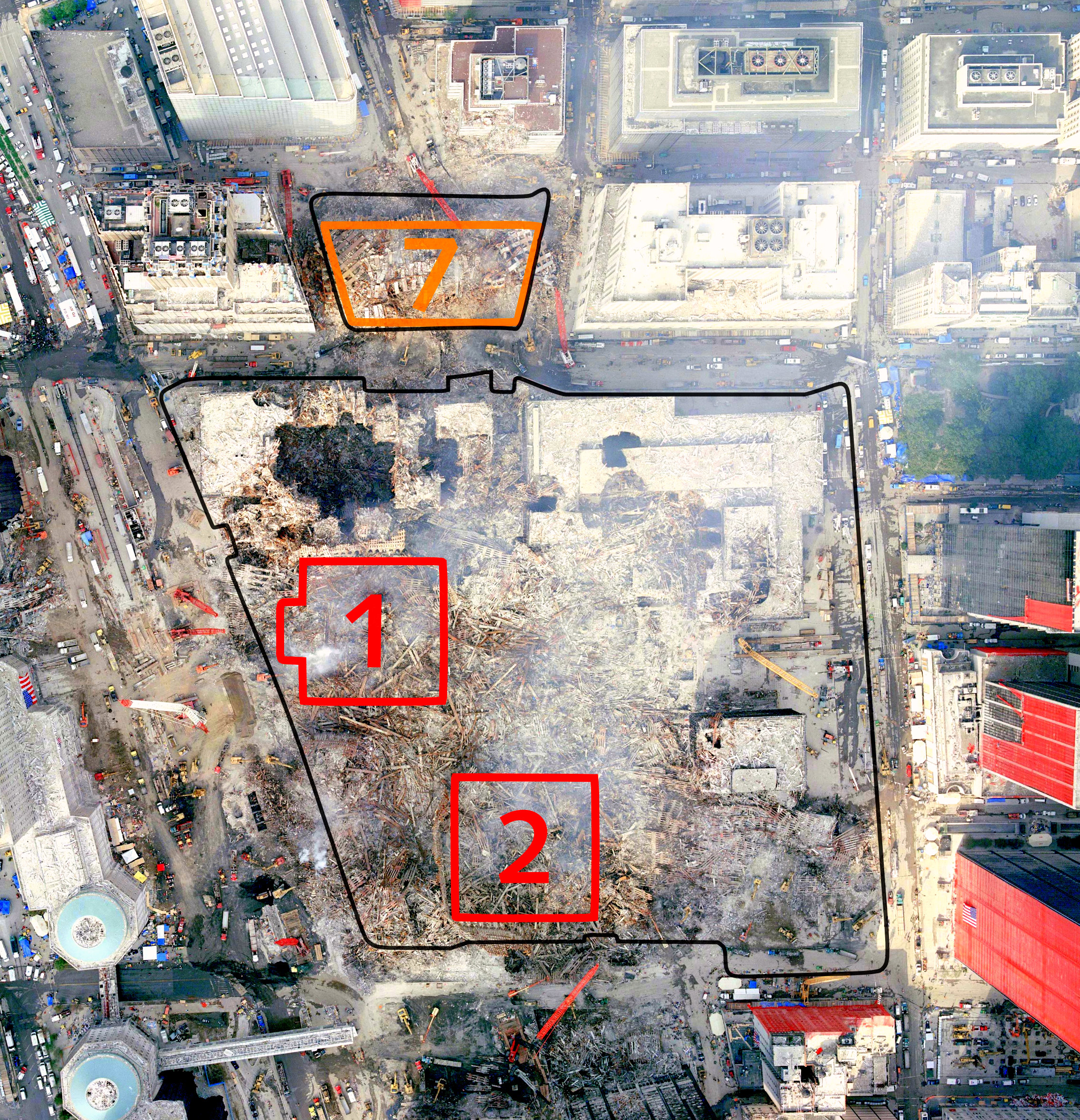
WTC complex and neighboring buildings, on September 23, 2001. Remaining portion of 4 WTC visible at southeast corner. Footprints of the Twin Towers and 7 WTC highlighted.

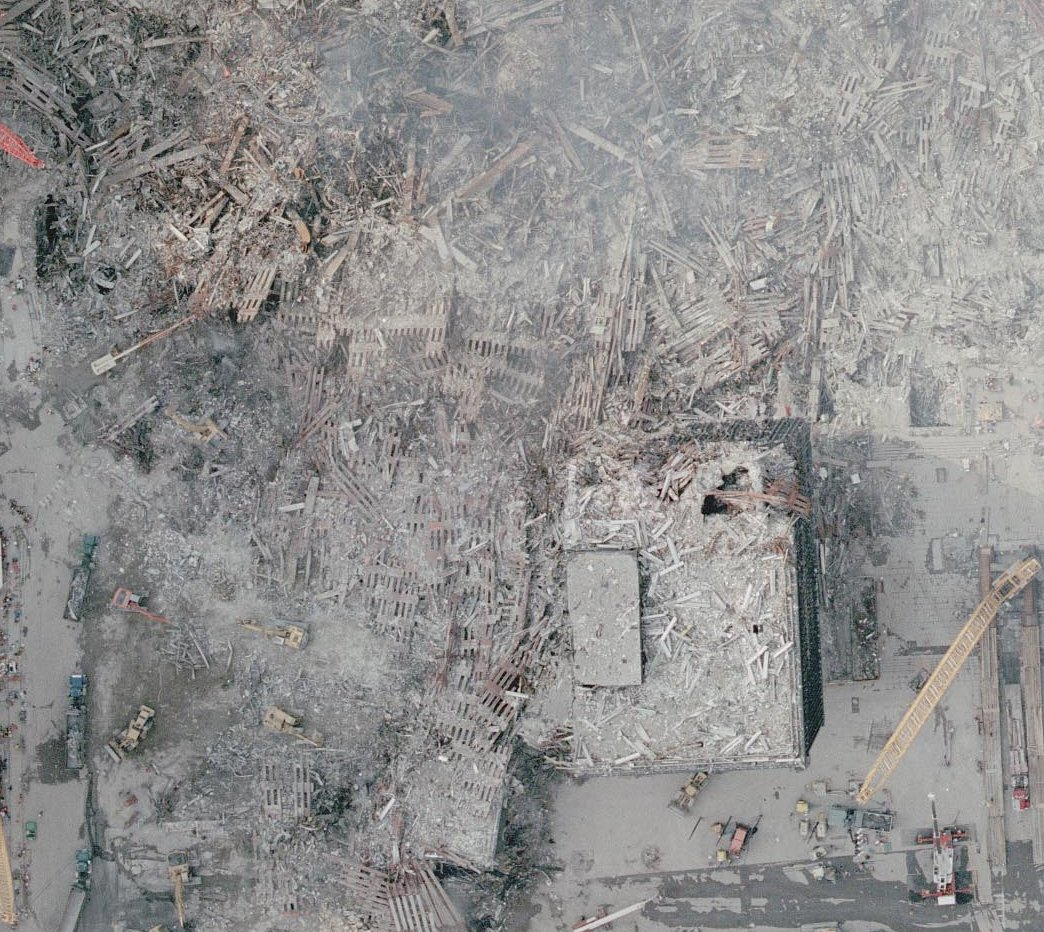
Site of 4 WTC in NOAA aerial image, oriented with south at left of image (September 23, 2001). Much of 4 WTC is destroyed (entire left of image), with only the damaged northern portion identifiable (at right).

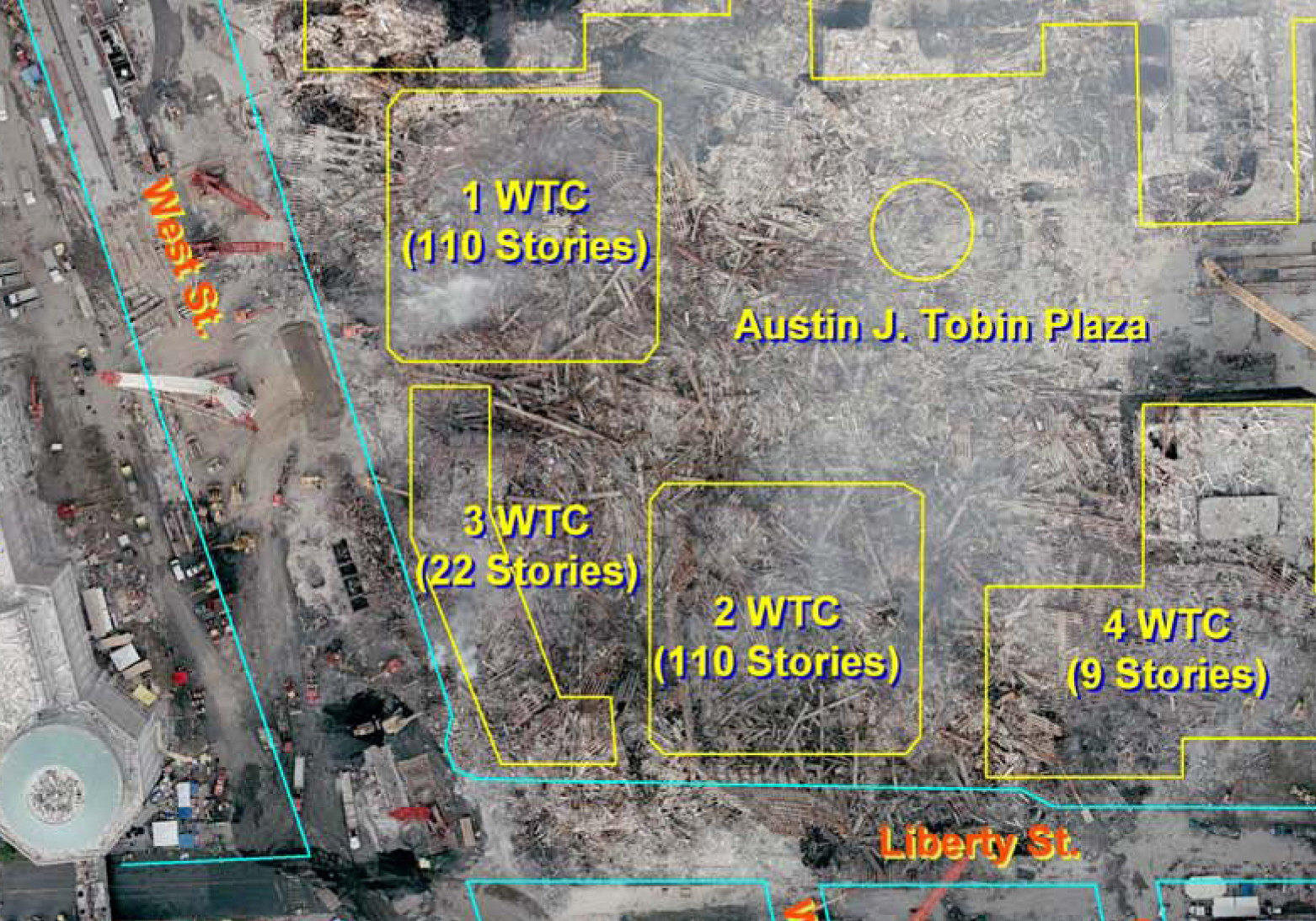
A bird's-eye view of the World Trade Center complex, September 17, 2001, with the original locations of the buildings.
