= World Trade Center (1973–2001) =

Complex of buildings in New York City

- Brandmark of the WTC, used from 1993 to 2001

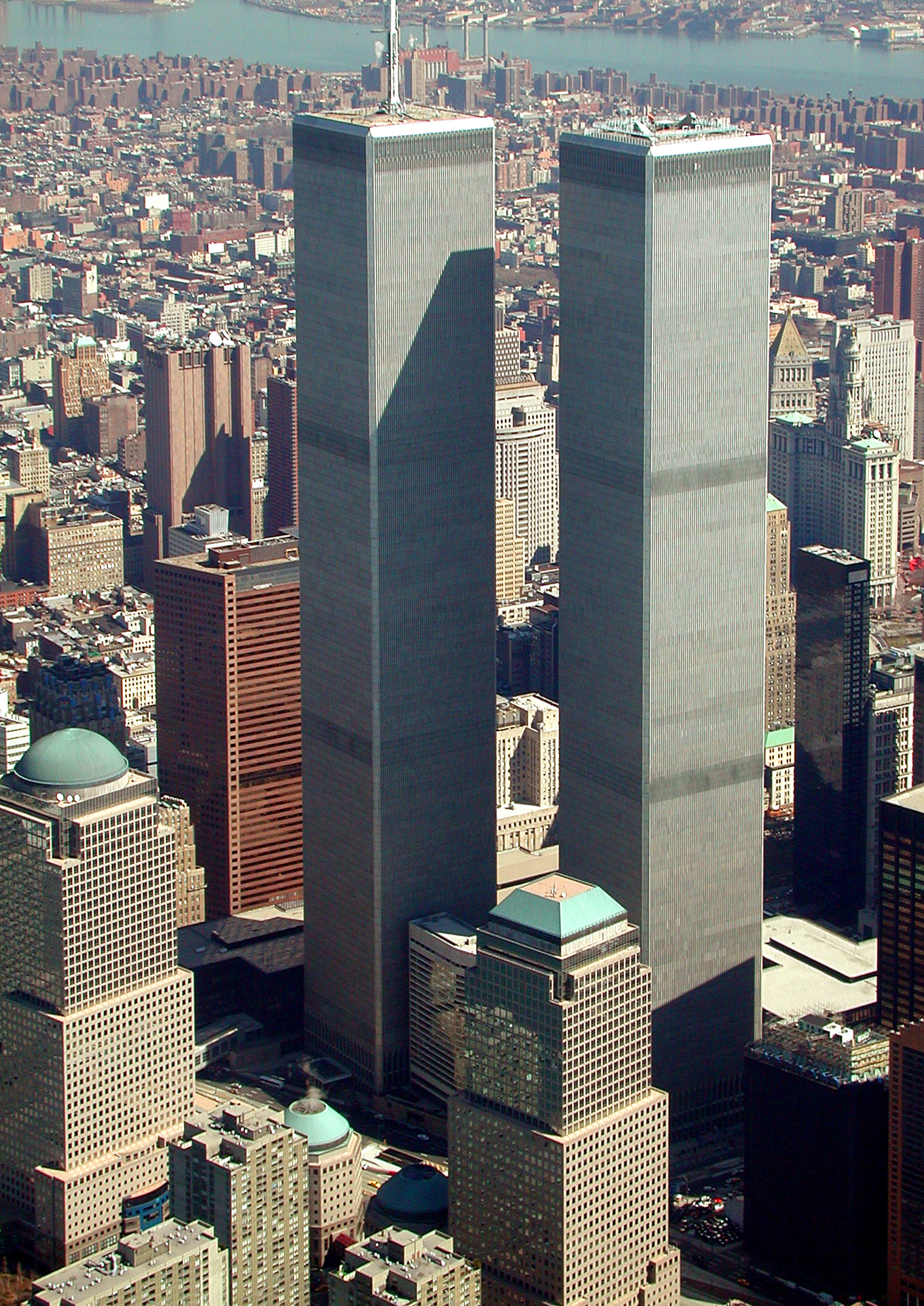
- The original complex in March 2001. The tower on the left, with the antenna spire, was 1 WTC. The tower on the right was 2 WTC. All seven buildings of the WTC complex are partially visible. The red granite-clad building left of the Twin Towers was the original 7 World Trade Center. In the background is the East River.

Record height
- Tallest in the world from 1970 to 1973^{[I]}
- Preceded by: Empire State Building
- Surpassed by: Sears Tower

General information
- Status: Destroyed
- Architectural style: New Formalism (Buildings 1, 2, 4, 5, 6)
- Location: Lower Manhattan, New York, U.S.
- Coordinates: 40°42′42″N 74°00′45″W
- Groundbreaking: August 5, 1966; January 18, 1967 (South Tower)
- Construction started: 1 WTC: August 6, 1968; 2 WTC: January 1969; 3 WTC: March 1979; 4 WTC: 1974; WTC Mall: 1974; 5 WTC: 1970; 6 WTC: 1969; 7 WTC: October 2, 1984
- Topped-out: 1 WTC: December 23, 1970; 2 WTC: July 19, 1971
- Completed: 1 WTC: 1972; 2 WTC: 1973; 3 WTC: April 1, 1981; 4 WTC: 1975; WTC Mall: 1975; 5 WTC: 1972; 6 WTC: 1973; 7 WTC: March 1987
- Opening: 1 WTC: December 15, 1970; 2 WTC: September 1971; 3 WTC: July 1, 1981; 4 WTC: January 1977; 5 WTC: March 1972; 6 WTC: January 1974; 7 WTC: May 1987
- Inaugurated: April 4, 1973
- Destroyed: September 11, 2001 (28 years, 5 months and 7 days after inauguration)
- Owner: Port Authority of New York and New Jersey
Other information
Height
Antenna spire	1 WTC: 1,728 feet (526.7 m)
Roof	1 WTC: 1,368 feet (417.0 m); 2 WTC: 1,362 feet (415.1 m); 3 WTC: 250 feet (76.2 m); 4 and 5 WTC: 120 feet (36.6 m); 6 WTC: 110 feet (33.5 m); 7 WTC: 610 feet (185.9 m)
Top floor	1 WTC: 1,355 feet (413 m); 2 WTC: 1,348 ft (411 m)
Technical details
Floor count	1 and 2 WTC: 110 floors; 3 WTC: 22 floors; 4 and 5 WTC: 9 floors; WTC Mall: 2 floors; 6 WTC: 8 floors; 7 WTC: 47 floors
Floor area	1 and 2 WTC: 4,300,000 sq ft (400,000 m^{2}) each; 4, 5, and 6 WTC: 500,000 sq ft (50,000 m^{2}) each; 7 WTC: 1,868,000 sq ft (170,000 m^{2})
Lifts/elevators	1 WTC: 99; 2 WTC: 95

Design and construction
- Architects: Minoru Yamasaki; Emery Roth & Sons
- Developer: Port Authority of New York and New Jersey
- Engineer: Worthington, Skilling, Helle & Jackson, Leslie E. Robertson Associates
- Main contractor: Tishman Realty & Construction Company

Website
- panynj.gov at the Wayback Machine (archived 2001-04-13)

References
- I.

The original World Trade Center (WTC) was a complex of seven buildings in the Financial District of Lower Manhattan in New York City. Built primarily between 1966 and 1975, it was dedicated on April 4, 1973. The complex included the 110-story-tall Twin Towers, the tallest buildings in the world at the time of completion—with the original 1 World Trade Center (the North Tower) at 1,368 feet (417 m), and 2 World Trade Center (the South Tower) at 1,362 feet (415.1 m)—and the tallest twin skyscrapers in the world until the Petronas Towers opened in 1996. The other buildings in the complex were the Marriott World Trade Center (3 WTC), 4 WTC, 5 WTC, 6 WTC, and 7 WTC. The complex contained 13,400,000 square feet (1,240,000 m^{2}) of office space and, prior to its completion, was projected to accommodate an estimated 130,000 people. The complex was destroyed on September 11, 2001, after two hijacked planes were flown into the towers in a coordinated terrorist attack.

The core complex cost about $400 million (equivalent to $2.43 billion in 2025). David Rockefeller suggested the construction of a large office building complex to help stimulate urban renewal in Lower Manhattan, and his brother Nelson, at that time New York's 49th governor, signed the legislation to build it. The buildings at the complex were designed by Minoru Yamasaki. In 1998, the Port Authority of New York and New Jersey decided to privatize the complex by leasing the buildings to a private company to manage. It awarded the lease to Silverstein Properties in July 2001. During its existence, the World Trade Center symbolized globalization and the economic power and prosperity of the United States. Although their design was initially criticized by New Yorkers and architectural critics, the Twin Towers became an icon of New York City. They had a major role in popular culture, and according to one estimate were depicted in 472 films. The Twin Towers were also used in Philippe Petit's tightrope-walking performance on August 7, 1974. Following the September 11 attacks, mentions of the complex in various media were altered or deleted, and several dozen "memorial films" were created.

The World Trade Center, a symbol of New York City and a major economic center, was the target of several major crime and terrorist incidents, including a fire on February 12, 1975; a bombing on February 26, 1993; and a bank robbery on January 14, 1998. On September 11, 2001, al-Qaeda-affiliated hijackers flew two Boeing 767 jets, one into each of the Twin Towers, seventeen minutes apart; between 16,400 and 18,000 people were in the Twin Towers when they were struck. The fires from the impacts were intensified by the planes' burning jet fuel, which, along with the initial damage to the buildings' structural columns, ultimately caused both towers to collapse. The attacks killed 2,606 people in and around the towers, as well as all 157 on board the two aircraft (including the 10 hijackers). Falling debris from the towers, combined with fires in several surrounding buildings that were initiated by falling debris, led to the partial or complete collapse of all the WTC complex's buildings, including 7 World Trade Center, and caused catastrophic damage to 10 other large structures in the surrounding area.

The cleanup and recovery process at the World Trade Center site took eight months, during which the remains of the other buildings were demolished. On May 30, 2002, the last piece of WTC steel was ceremonially removed. A new World Trade Center complex is being built with six new skyscrapers and several other buildings, many of which are complete. A memorial and museum to those killed in the attacks, a new rapid transit hub, and an elevated park have opened. The memorial features two square reflecting pools in the center marking where the Twin Towers stood. One World Trade Center, the tallest building in the Western Hemisphere at 1,776 feet (541 m) and the lead building for the new complex, completed construction in May 2013 and opened in November 2014.

== Before the World Trade Center ==
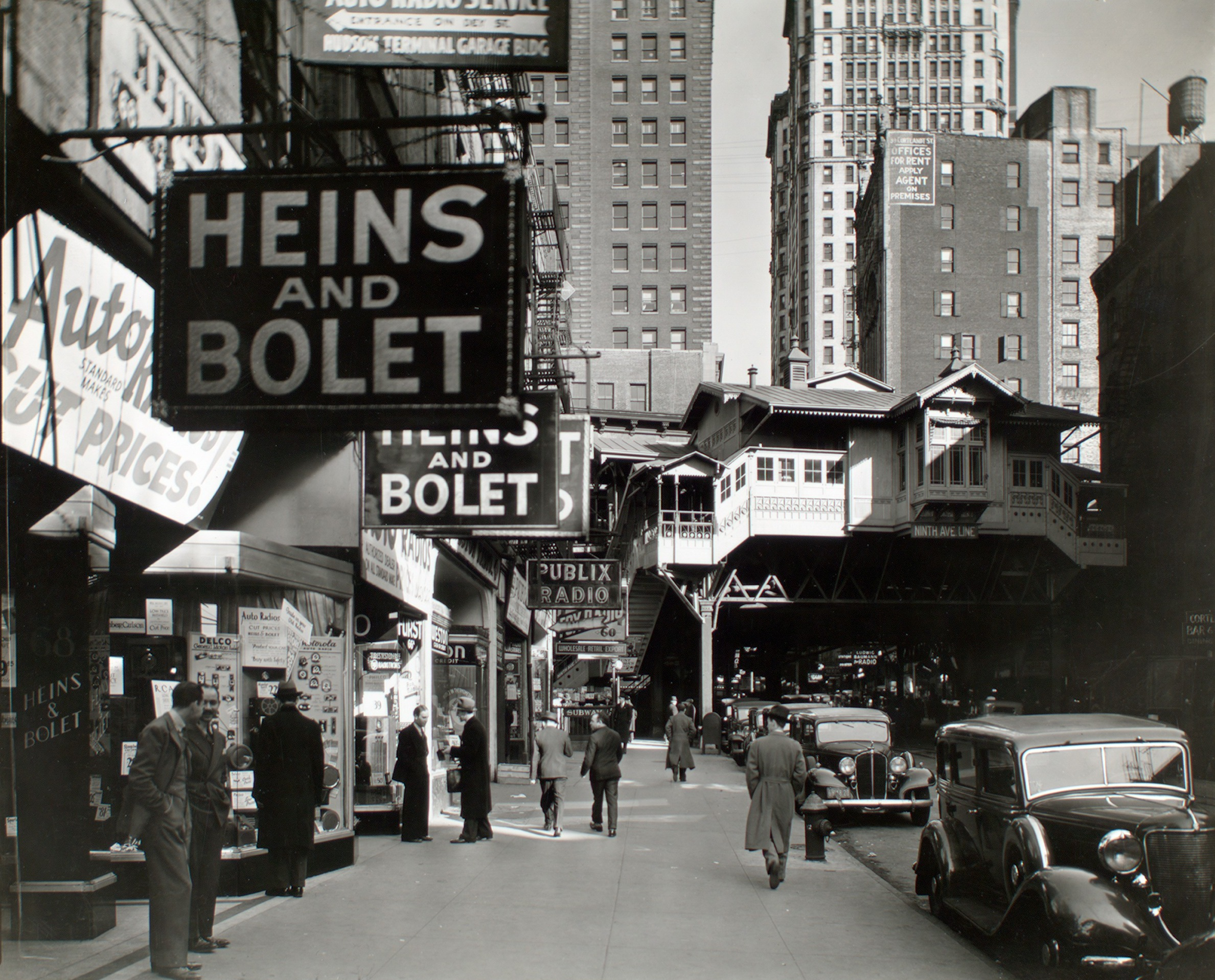
Radio Row and Cortlandt Street station (background) in 1936

=== Site ===
The western portion of the World Trade Center site was originally under the Hudson River. The shoreline was in the vicinity of Greenwich Street, which is closer to the site's eastern border. It was on this shoreline, close to the intersection of Greenwich and the former Dey Street, that Dutch explorer Adriaen Block's ship, Tyger, burned to the waterline in November 1613, stranding him and his crew and forcing them to overwinter on the island. They built the first European settlement in Manhattan. The remains of the ship were buried under landfill when the shoreline was extended beginning in 1797 and was discovered during excavation work in 1916. The remains of a second eighteenth-century ship were discovered in 2010 during excavation work at the site. The ship, believed to be a Hudson River sloop, was found just south of where the Twin Towers stood, about 20 feet (6 meters) below the surface.

Later, the area became New York City's Radio Row, which existed from 1921 to 1966. The neighborhood was a warehouse district in what is now Tribeca and the Financial District. Harry Schneck opened City Radio on Cortlandt Street in 1921, and eventually, the area held several blocks of electronics stores, with Cortlandt Street as its central axis. The used radios, war surplus electronics (e.g., AN/ARC-5 radios), junk, and parts were often piled so high they would spill out onto the street, attracting collectors and scroungers. According to a business writer, it also was the origin of the electronic component distribution business.

=== Establishment of the World Trade Center ===
The idea of establishing a World Trade Center in New York City was first proposed in 1943. The New York State Legislature passed a bill authorizing New York Governor Thomas E. Dewey to begin developing plans for the project, but the plans were put on hold in 1949. During the late 1940s and 1950s, economic growth in New York City was concentrated in Midtown Manhattan. To help stimulate urban renewal in Lower Manhattan, David Rockefeller suggested that the Port Authority build a World Trade Center there.

Plans for the use of eminent domain to remove the shops in Radio Row bounded by Vesey, Church, Liberty, and West Streets began in 1961 when the Port Authority of New York and New Jersey was deciding to build the world's first world trade center. They had two choices: the east side of Lower Manhattan, near the South Street Seaport; or the west side, near the Hudson and Manhattan Railroad (H&M) station, Hudson Terminal. Initial plans, made public in 1961, identified a site along the East River for the World Trade Center. As a bi-state agency, the Port Authority required approval for new projects from the governors of both New York and New Jersey. New Jersey Governor Robert B. Meyner objected to New York getting a $335 million project. Toward the end of 1961, negotiations with outgoing New Jersey Governor Meyner reached a stalemate.

At the time, ridership on New Jersey's H&M Railroad had declined substantially—from a high of 113 million riders in 1927, to 26 million in 1958—after new automobile tunnels and bridges had opened across the Hudson River. In a December 1961 meeting between Port Authority director Austin J. Tobin and newly elected New Jersey Governor Richard J. Hughes, the Port Authority offered to take over the H&M Railroad. They also decided to move the World Trade Center project to the Hudson Terminal building site on the west side of Lower Manhattan, a more convenient location for New Jersey commuters arriving via PATH. With the new location and the Port Authority's acquisition of the H&M Railroad, New Jersey agreed to support the World Trade Center project. As part of the deal, the Port Authority renamed the H&M "Port Authority Trans-Hudson", or PATH for short.

To compensate Radio Row business owners for their displacement, the Port Authority gave each business $3,000 without regard to how long the business had been there or how prosperous it was. The Port Authority began purchasing properties in the area for the World Trade Center by March 1965, and demolition of Radio Row began in March 1966. It was completely demolished by the end of the year.

Approval was also needed from New York City Mayor John Lindsay and the New York City Council. Disagreements with the city centered on tax issues, and the New York City Planning Commission wanted the Port Authority to increase its payments in lieu of taxes (PILOT) to the city government. On August 3, 1966, an agreement was reached whereby the Port Authority would make annual PILOTs for the portion of the World Trade Center leased to private tenants. In subsequent years, the payments would rise as the real estate tax rate increased. In May 1967, the New York City Planning Commission approved several changes to the street grid that would allow the Port Authority to begin acquiring land for the complex.

== Development ==
=== Design ===
Video of the World Trade Center in the 1960s and early 70s, including scenes of its construction

On September 20, 1962, the Port Authority announced the selection of Minoru Yamasaki as lead architect and Emery Roth & Sons as associate architects. Yamasaki devised the plan to incorporate twin towers. His original plan called for the towers to be 80 stories tall, but to meet the Port Authority's requirement for 10,000,000 square feet (930,000 m^{2}) of office space, the buildings would each have to be 110 stories tall. The Port Authority publicly presented a model for the complex on January 18, 1964. The original plans called for two towers rising 1,350 feet (410 m), as well as several six-story buildings surrounding a central plaza (later the Austin J. Tobin Plaza). These buildings were to include office space, restaurants, a hotel, exhibition space, stores, and an information center about world trade.

The agency released its final model of the complex in March 1966. Despite public criticism over the height of the 110-story twin towers, Yamasaki & Associates and Emery Roth & Sons made only relatively minor changes to the plans, which were released in May 1966. The revised plans called for the twin towers and four additional low-rise structures to surround the central plaza.

==== Design features ====
Yamasaki's design for the World Trade Center called for a square plan approximately 208 feet (63 m) in dimension on each side. The buildings were designed with narrow office windows 18 inches (46 cm) wide, which reflected Yamasaki's fear of heights as well as his desire to make building occupants feel secure. His design included building facades clad in aluminum-alloy. The World Trade Center was one of the most striking American implementations of the architectural ethic of Le Corbusier and was the seminal expression of Yamasaki's gothic modernist tendencies. He was also inspired by Islamic architecture, elements of which he incorporated in the building's design, having previously designed Saudi Arabia's Dhahran International Airport with the Saudi Binladin Group.

A major limiting factor in building height is the issue of elevators; the taller the building, the more elevators are needed to service it, requiring more space-consuming elevator banks. Yamasaki and the engineers decided to use a new system with two "sky lobbies"—floors where people could switch from a large-capacity express elevator to a local elevator that goes to each floor in a section. This system, inspired by the local-express train operation used in New York City's subway system, allowed the design to stack local elevators within the same elevator shaft. Located on the 44th and 78th floors of each tower, the sky lobbies enabled the elevators to be used efficiently. This increased the amount of usable space on each floor from 62 to 75 percent by reducing the number of elevator shafts. Altogether, the World Trade Center had 95 express and local elevators.

The structural engineering firm Worthington, Skilling, Helle & Jackson worked to implement Yamasaki's design, developing the framed-tube structural system used in the twin towers. The Port Authority's Engineering Department served as foundation engineers, Joseph R. Loring & Associates as electrical engineers, and Jaros, Baum & Bolles (JB&B) as mechanical engineers. Tishman Realty & Construction Company was the general contractor on the World Trade Center project. Guy F. Tozzoli, director of the World Trade Department at the Port Authority, and Rino M. Monti, the Port Authority's Chief Engineer, oversaw the project. As an interstate agency, the Port Authority was not subject to the local laws and regulations of the City of New York, including building codes. Nonetheless, the World Trade Center's structural engineers ended up following draft versions of New York City's new 1968 building codes.

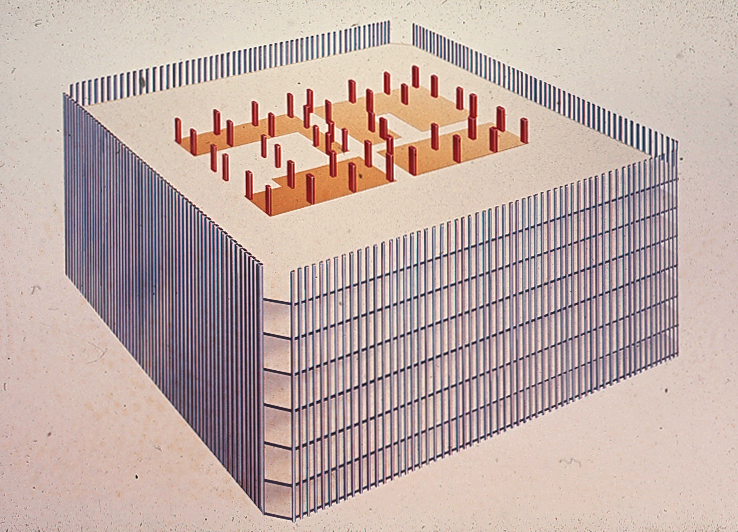
World Trade Centers 1 and 2 were constructed with a framed tube structure

The framed-tube design, introduced in the 1960s by Bangladeshi-American structural engineer Fazlur Rahman Khan, was a new approach that allowed more open floor plans than the traditional design that distributed columns throughout the interior to support building loads. Each of the World Trade Center towers had 236 high-strength, load-bearing perimeter steel columns which acted as Vierendeel trusses. The perimeter columns were spaced closely together to form a strong, rigid wall structure, supporting virtually all lateral loads such as wind loads, and sharing the gravity load with the core columns. The perimeter structure containing 59 columns per side was constructed with extensive use of prefabricated modular pieces, each consisting of three columns, three stories tall, connected by spandrel plates. The spandrel plates were welded to the columns to create the modular pieces off-site at the fabrication shop. Adjacent modules were bolted together with the splices occurring at mid-span of the columns and spandrels. The spandrel plates were located at each floor, transmitting shear stress between columns, allowing them to work together in resisting lateral loads. The joints between modules were staggered vertically so that the column splices between adjacent modules were not on the same floor. Below the 7th floor to the foundation, there were fewer, wider-spaced perimeter columns to accommodate doorways.

The core of the towers housed the elevator and utility shafts, restrooms, three stairwells, and other support spaces. The core of each tower was a rectangular area 87 by 135 feet (27 by 41 m) and contained 47 steel columns running from the bedrock to the top of the tower. The large, column-free space between the perimeter and core was bridged by prefabricated floor trusses. The floors supported their own weight as well as live loads, providing lateral stability to the exterior walls and distributing wind loads among the exterior walls. The floors consisted of 4-inch (10 cm) thick lightweight concrete slabs laid on a fluted steel deck. A grid of lightweight bridging trusses and main trusses supported the floors. The trusses connected to the perimeter at alternate columns and were on 6 foot 8 inch (2.03 m) centers. The top chords of the trusses were bolted to seats welded to the spandrels on the exterior side and a channel welded to the core columns on the interior side. The floors were connected to the perimeter spandrel plates with viscoelastic dampers that helped reduce the amount of sway felt by building occupants.

Hat trusses (or "outrigger trusses") located from the 107th floor to the top of the buildings were designed to support a tall communication antenna on top of each building. Only 1 WTC (North Tower) actually had a spire antenna fitted, which was added in late May to early June 1979. The truss system consisted of six trusses along the long axis of the core and four along the short axis. This truss system allowed some load redistribution between the perimeter and core columns and supported the transmission tower.

The framed-tube design, using steel core and perimeter columns protected with sprayed-on fire-resistant material, created a relatively lightweight structure that would sway more in response to the wind compared to traditional structures, such as the Empire State Building, that has thick, heavy masonry for fireproofing of steel structural elements. During the design process, wind tunnel tests were done to establish design wind pressures that the World Trade Center towers could be subjected to and structural response to those forces. Experiments also were done to evaluate how much sway occupants could comfortably tolerate; however, many subjects experienced dizziness and other ill effects. One of the chief engineers, Leslie Robertson, worked with Canadian engineer Alan G. Davenport to develop viscoelastic dampers to absorb some of the sways. These viscoelastic dampers, used throughout the structures at the joints between floor trusses and perimeter columns along with some other structural modifications, reduced the building sway to an acceptable level.

=== Construction ===
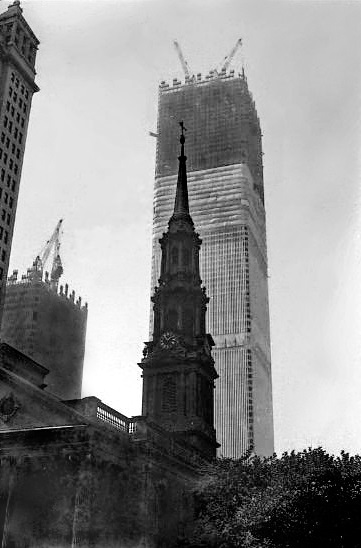
The World Trade Center under construction in May 1970

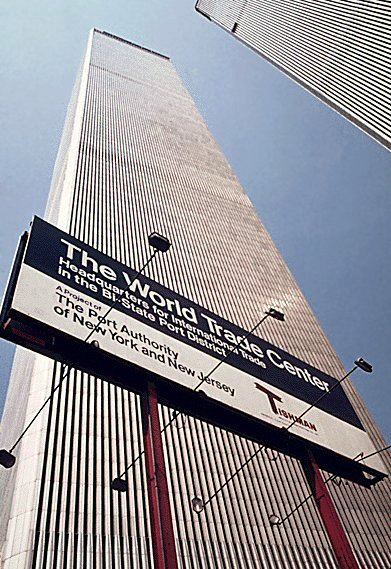
The Twin Towers of the World Trade Center in May 1973

In March 1965, the Port Authority began acquiring property at the World Trade Center site. Demolition work began on March 21, 1966, to clear thirteen square blocks of low rise buildings in Radio Row for its construction. Groundbreaking for the construction of the World Trade Center took place on August 5, 1966.

The site of the World Trade Center was located on filled land with the bedrock located 65 feet (20 m) below. To construct the World Trade Center, it was necessary to build a "bathtub" with a slurry wall around the West Street side of the site, to keep water from the Hudson River out. The slurry method selected by the Port Authority's chief engineer, John M. Kyle Jr., involved digging a trench, and as excavation proceeded, filling the space with a slurry consisting of a mixture of bentonite and water, which plugged holes and kept groundwater out. When the trench was dug out, a steel cage was inserted and concrete was poured in, forcing the slurry out. It took fourteen months for the slurry wall to be completed. It was necessary before the excavation of material from the interior of the site could begin. The 1,200,000 cubic yards (920,000 m^{3}) of excavated material were used (along with other fill and dredge material) to expand the Manhattan shoreline across West Street to form Battery Park City.

The Port Authority awarded $74 million in contracts to various steel suppliers in January 1967, and excavation of the bathtub began in late 1967. Construction work began on the North Tower in August 1968, and construction on the South Tower was under way by January 1969. The original Hudson Tubes, which carried PATH trains into Hudson Terminal, remained in service during the construction process until 1971, when a new station opened. The topping out ceremony of 1 WTC (North Tower) took place on December 23, 1970, while 2 WTC's ceremony (South Tower) occurred on July 19, 1971. Extensive use of prefabricated components helped to speed up the construction process, and the first tenants moved into the North Tower on December 15, 1970, while it was still under construction, while the South Tower began accepting tenants in January 1972. The complex had 111 tenants with a combined 1,800 employees by late 1971.

When the Twin Towers were completed, the total costs to the Port Authority had reached $900 million. The ribbon-cutting ceremony took place on April 4, 1973. In addition to the Twin Towers, the plan for the World Trade Center complex included four other low-rise buildings, which were built in the early 1970s. The 47-story 7 World Trade Center building was added in the 1980s, to the north of the main complex. Altogether, the main World Trade Center complex occupied a 16-acre (6.5 ha) superblock.

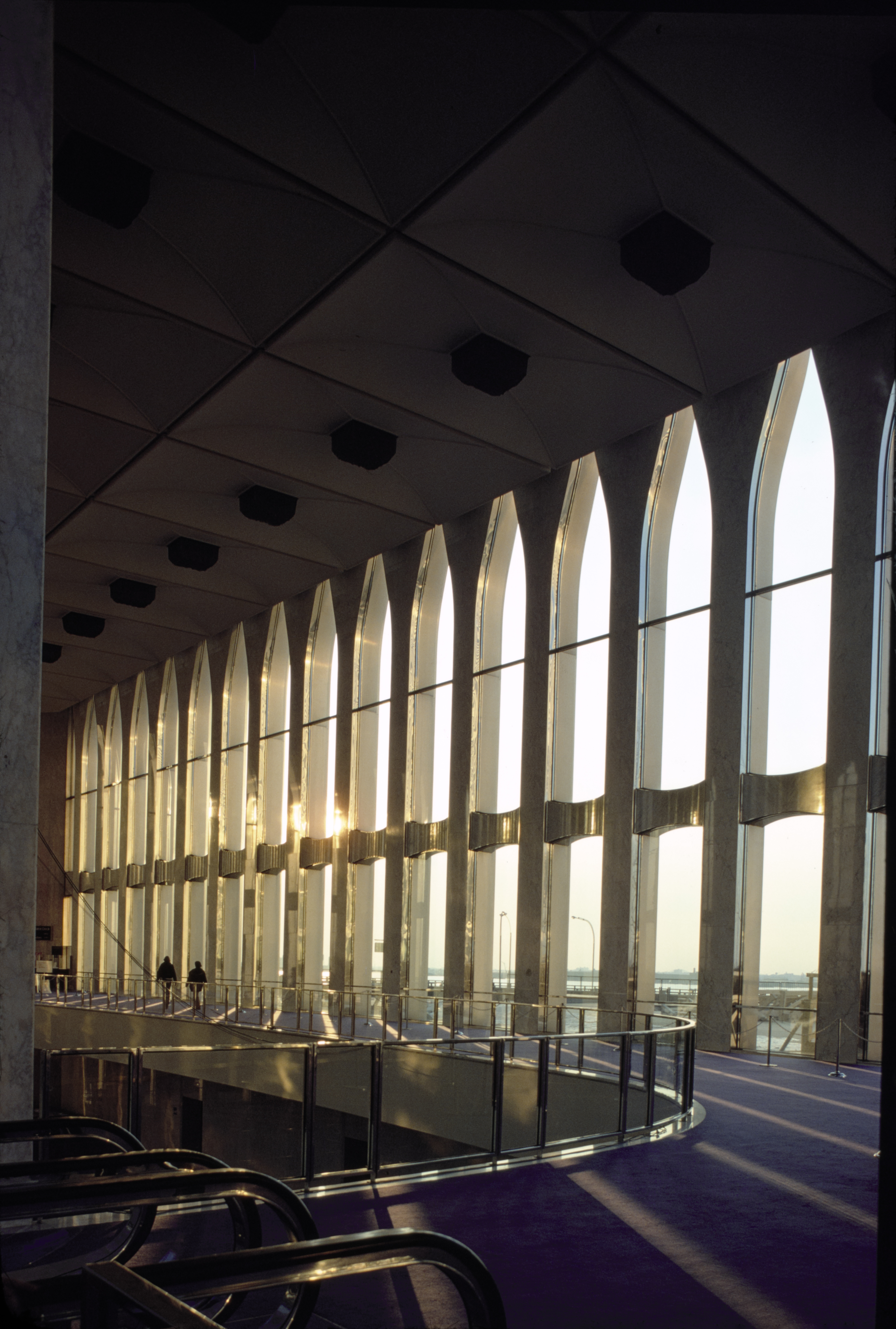
World Trade Center lobby interior with large cathedral-like arched windows

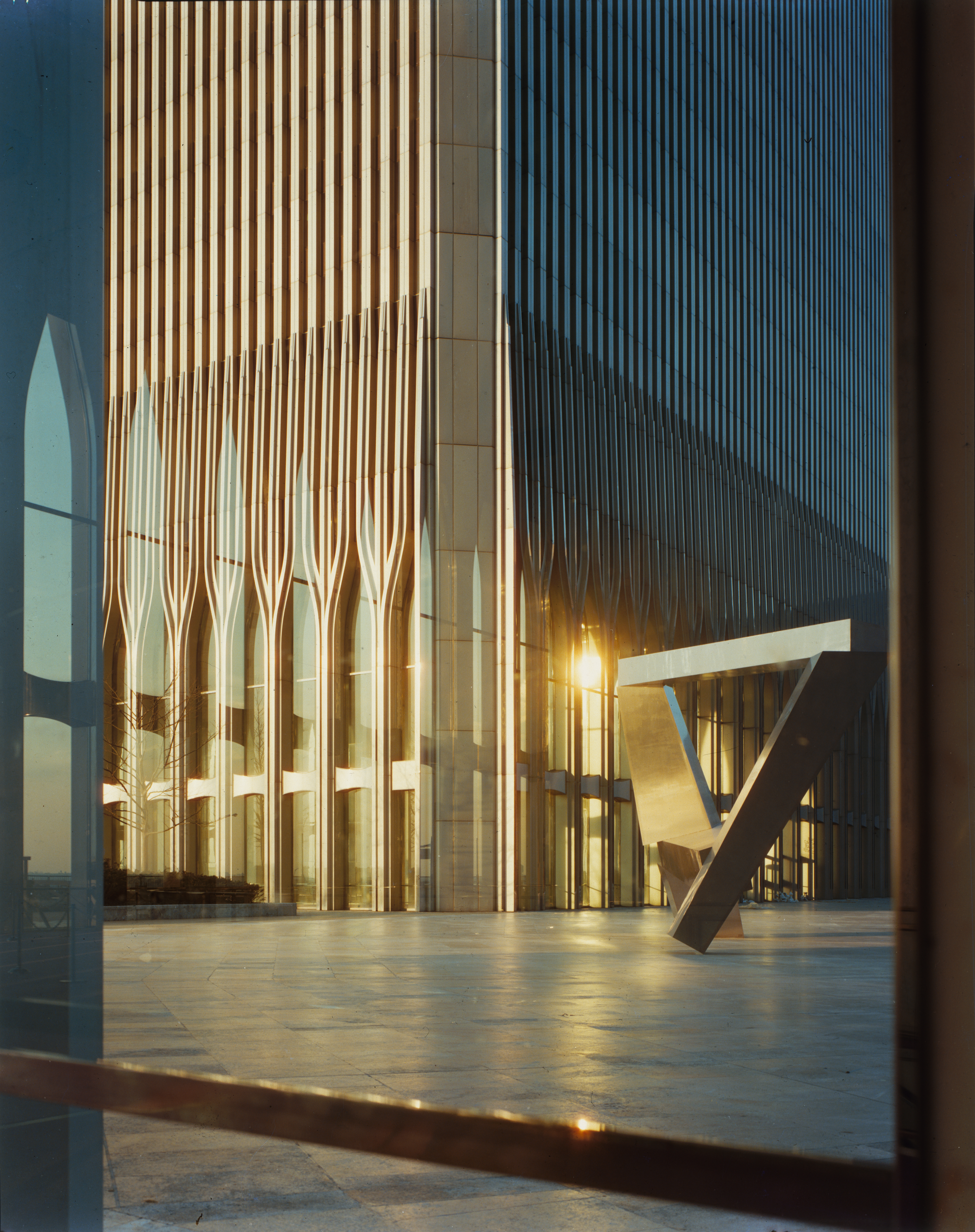
Exterior entrance trident columns with Ideogram sculpture

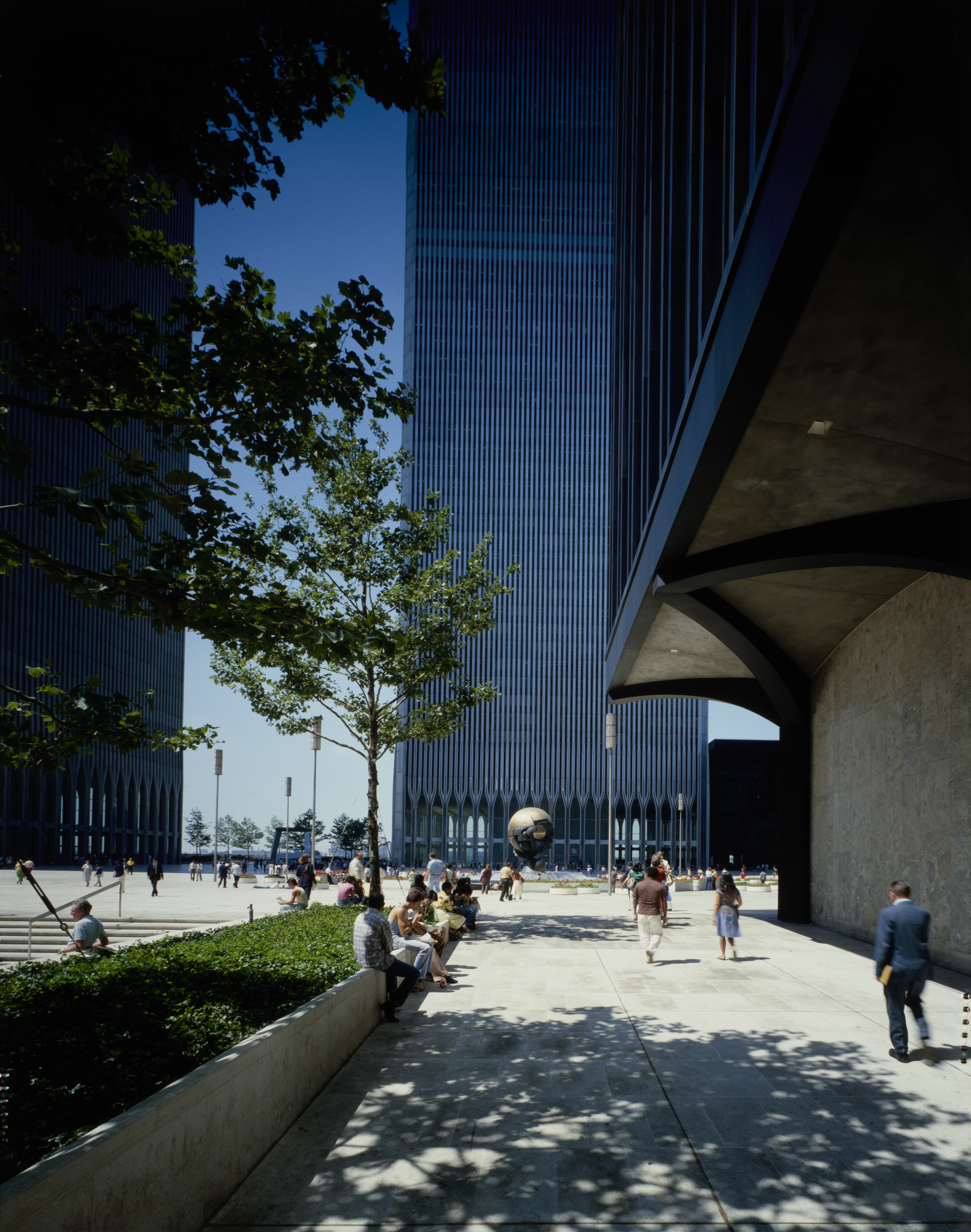
Exterior view from plaza

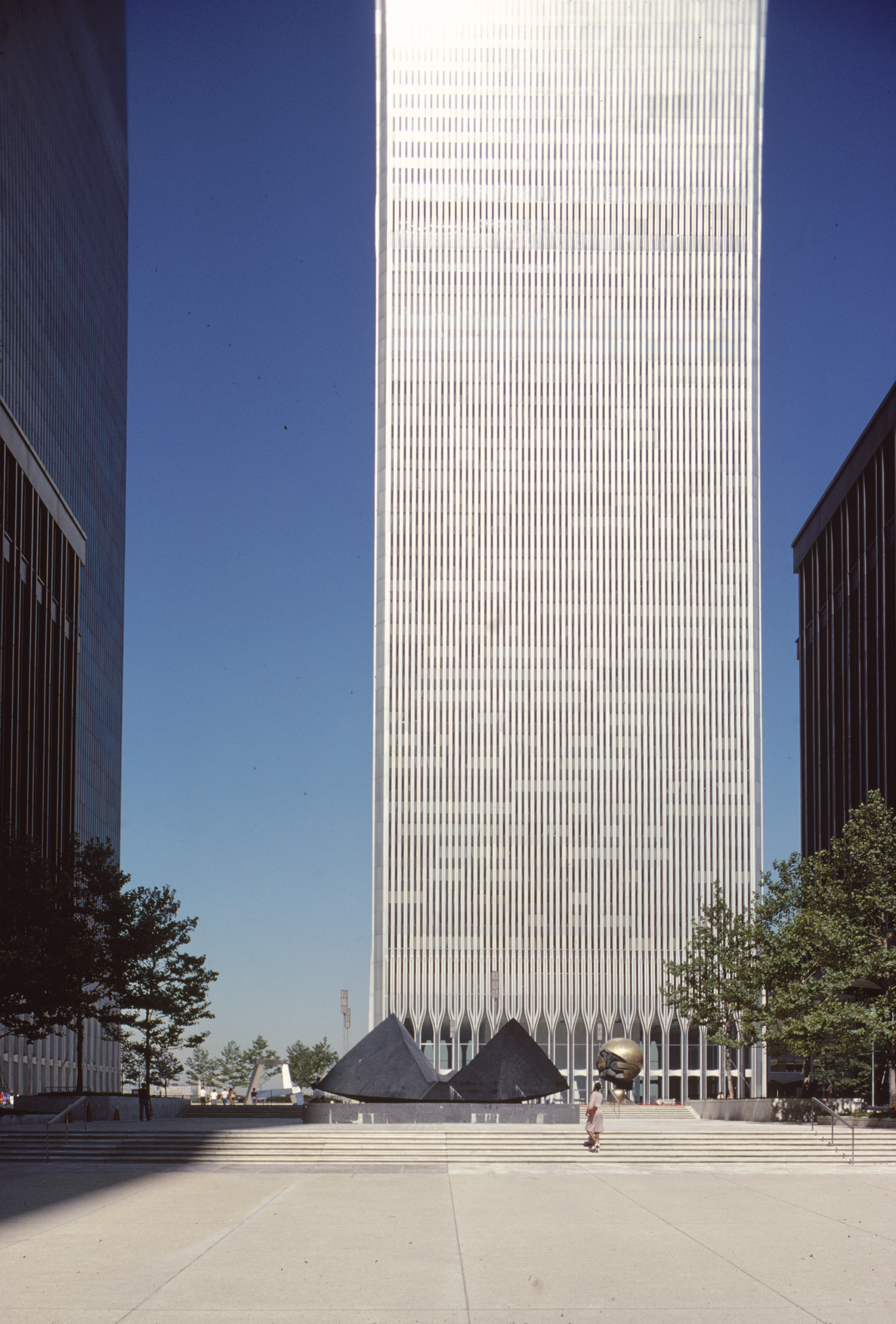
Exterior view with Cloud Fortress sculpture in front

== Complex ==
Map of complex

The World Trade Center complex housed more than 430 companies that were engaged in various commercial activities. The complex hosted 13,400,000 square feet (1,240,000 m^{2}) of office space, which according to a 1970 account was supposed to accommodate 130,000 people. On a typical weekday, an estimated 50,000 people worked in the complex and another 140,000 passed through as visitors. The World Trade Center was so large that it had its own ZIP Code, 10048. The towers offered expansive views from the observation deck atop the South Tower and the Windows on the World restaurant on top of the North Tower. The Twin Towers became known worldwide, appearing in numerous movies and television shows as well as on postcards and other merchandise. It became a New York icon, in the same league as the Empire State Building, the Chrysler Building, and the Statue of Liberty. The World Trade Center was compared to Rockefeller Center, which David Rockefeller's brother Nelson Rockefeller had developed in midtown Manhattan.

=== North and South Towers ===
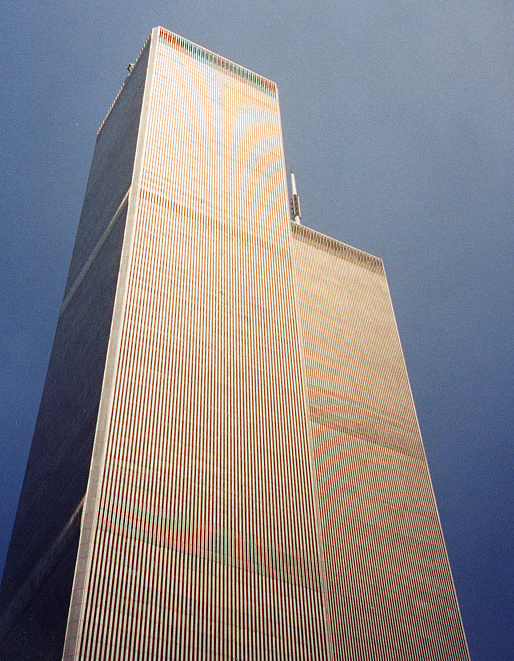
View from the ground, 1999

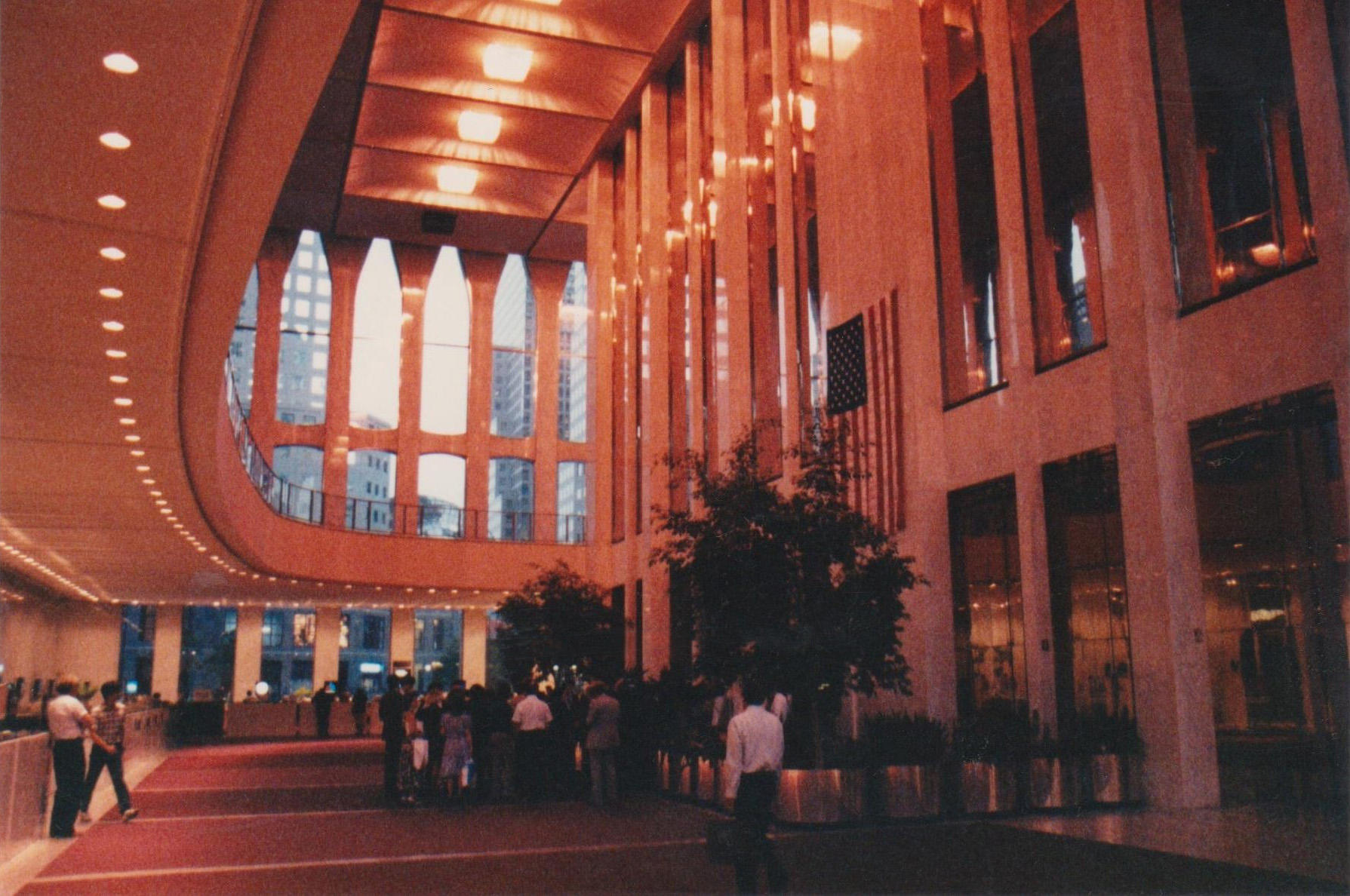
North Tower lobby, showing the elevator core with mirrors and red carpet, all lit with sodium light, 1990s

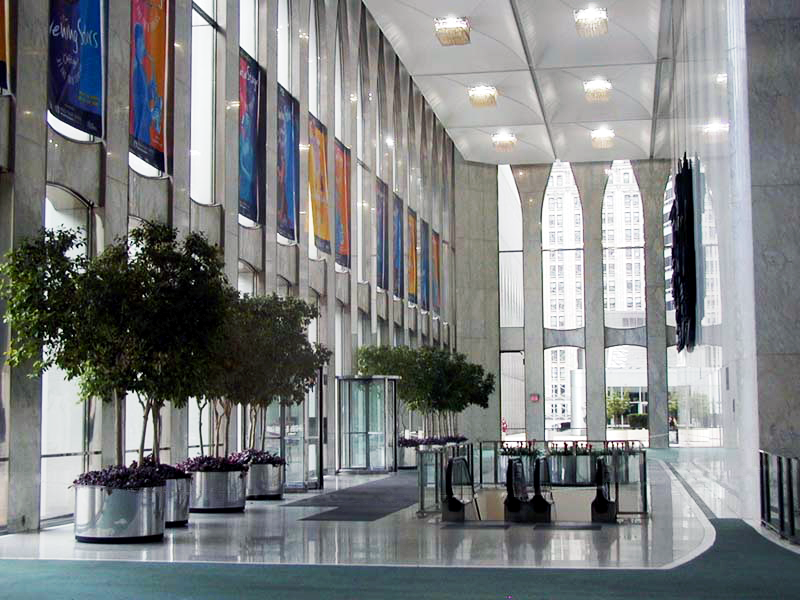
North Tower lobby, looking south along the east side of the building, 2000

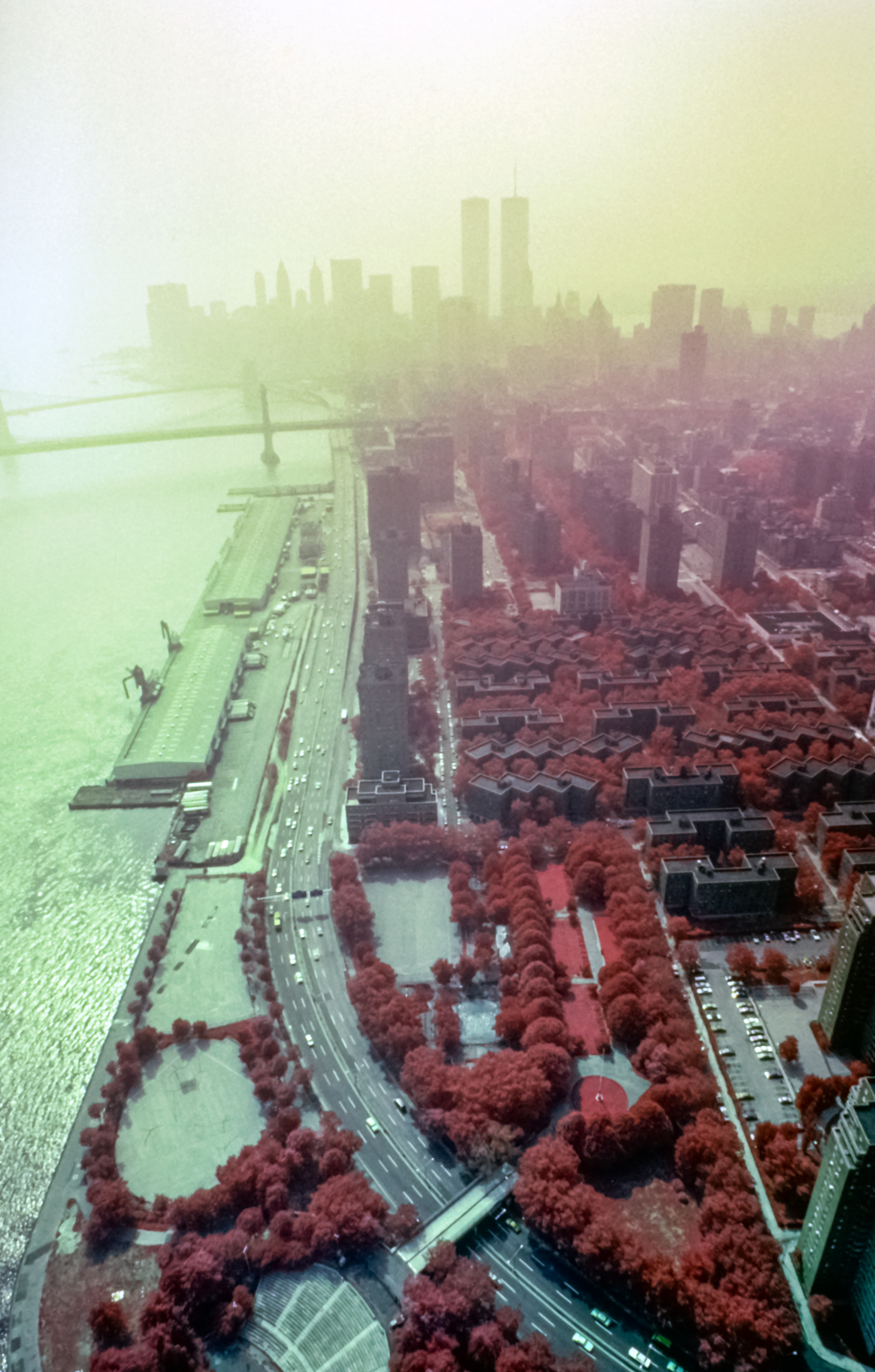
Lower Manhattan in 1980 with the twin towers visible in the background

1 World Trade Center (the North Tower) and 2 World Trade Center (the South Tower) were the main buildings of the complex. The visually nearly identical skyscrapers, commonly referred to as the Twin Towers, were designed by architect Minoru Yamasaki as framed tube structures, an at the time novel design which provided tenants with open floor plans, uninterrupted by columns or walls. Construction of the towers began in 1966. When completed in 1972, 1 World Trade Center became the tallest building in the world for two years, surpassing the Empire State Building after its 40-year reign. The North Tower stood 1,368 feet (417 m) tall and featured a 362 foot (110 m) telecommunications antenna or mast that was built on the roof in 1979 (which was upgraded in 1999 to accommodate DTV broadcasts). With this addition, the highest point of the North Tower reached 1,730 feet (530 m). Chicago's Willis Tower, then called Sears Tower, which was finished in May 1973, reached 1,450 feet (440 m) at the rooftop.

When completed in 1973, the South Tower became the second tallest building in the world at 1,362 feet (415 m). Its rooftop observation deck was 1,362 ft (415 m) high and its indoor observation deck was 1,310 ft (400 m) high. Each tower stood over 1,350 feet (410 m) high, and occupied about 1 acre (0.40 ha) of the total 16 acres (6.5 ha) of the site's land. During a press conference in 1973, Yamasaki was asked, "Why two 110-story buildings? Why not one 220-story building?" His tongue-in-cheek response was: "I didn't want to lose the human scale." Architectural critic Ada Louise Huxtable criticized the design of the twin towers when they were first announced, saying: "Here we have the world's daintiest architecture for the world's biggest buildings."

The Twin Towers had more floors (at 110) than any other building before the completion of the Sears Tower in 1973. This number of floors was not surpassed until the construction of the Burj Khalifa, which opened in 2010. The towers were also the world's tallest twin buildings until 1996, when the Petronas Towers opened. Each tower had a total mass of around 500,000 tons.

==== Floor plan ====
Floors	Purpose		Diagram of floors color-coded by function	
Floors	North Tower	South Tower	North Tower	South Tower
Roof	Communication and broadcast(antenna)	Outdoor observation deck		
108–109	Mechanical			
107	Windows on the World restaurant	Top of the World observatory		
106	Windows on the World restaurant	Tenant area		
79–105	Tenant area			
78	Skylobby			
77	Tenant area			
75–76	Mechanical			
45–74	Tenant area			
44	Skylobby			
43	Tenant area			
41–42	Mechanical			
9–40	Tenant area			
7–8	Mechanical			
Plaza, 2–6	Mezzanine, lobby, tenant area			
Concourse	Lobby, Shopping concourse			
B1–B3	Parking			
B4	Parking, mechanical			
B5–B6	Mechanical			

=== Austin J. Tobin Plaza ===
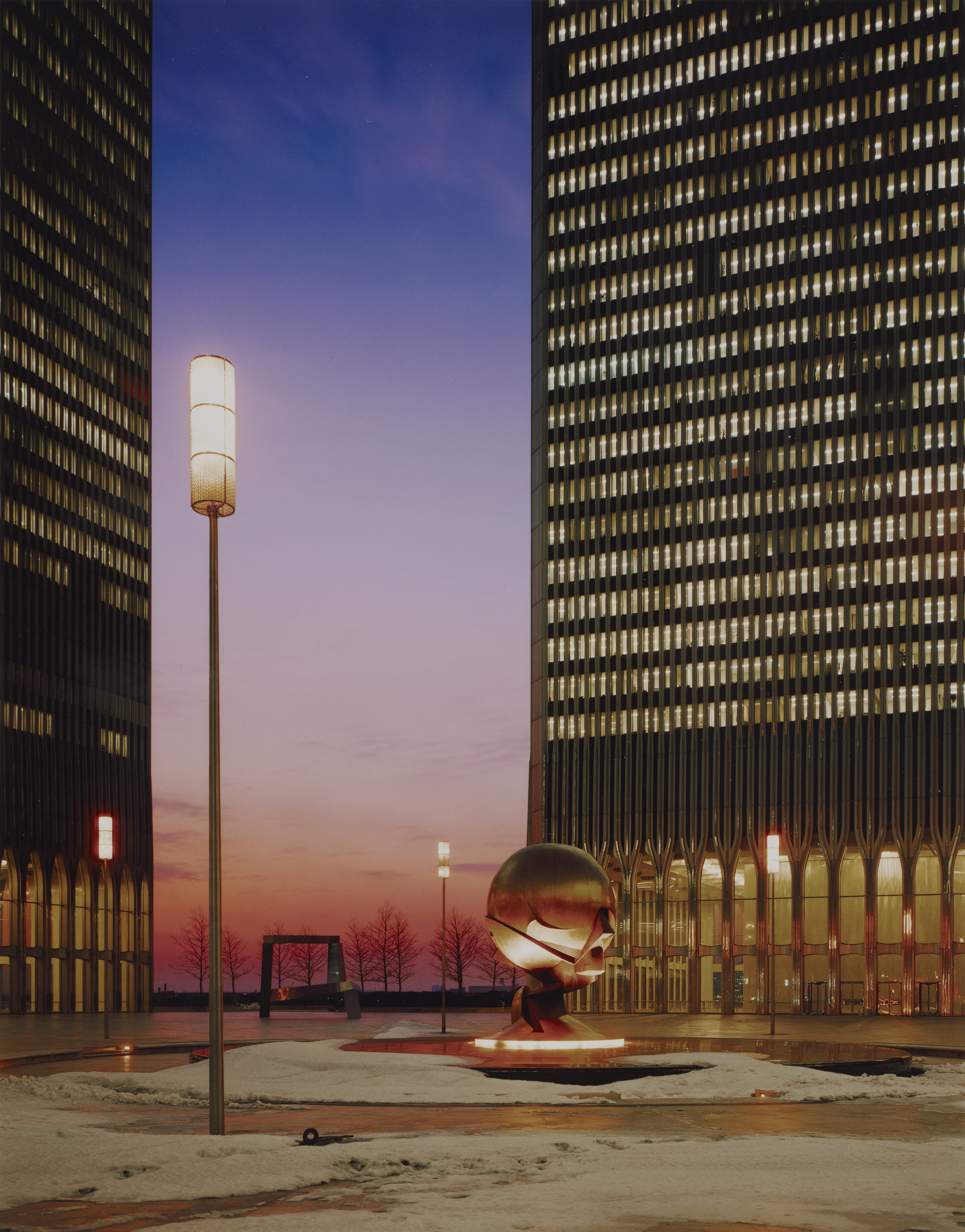
World Trade Center Plaza in 1976 with The Sphere by German artist Fritz Koenig, and Ideogram in the background

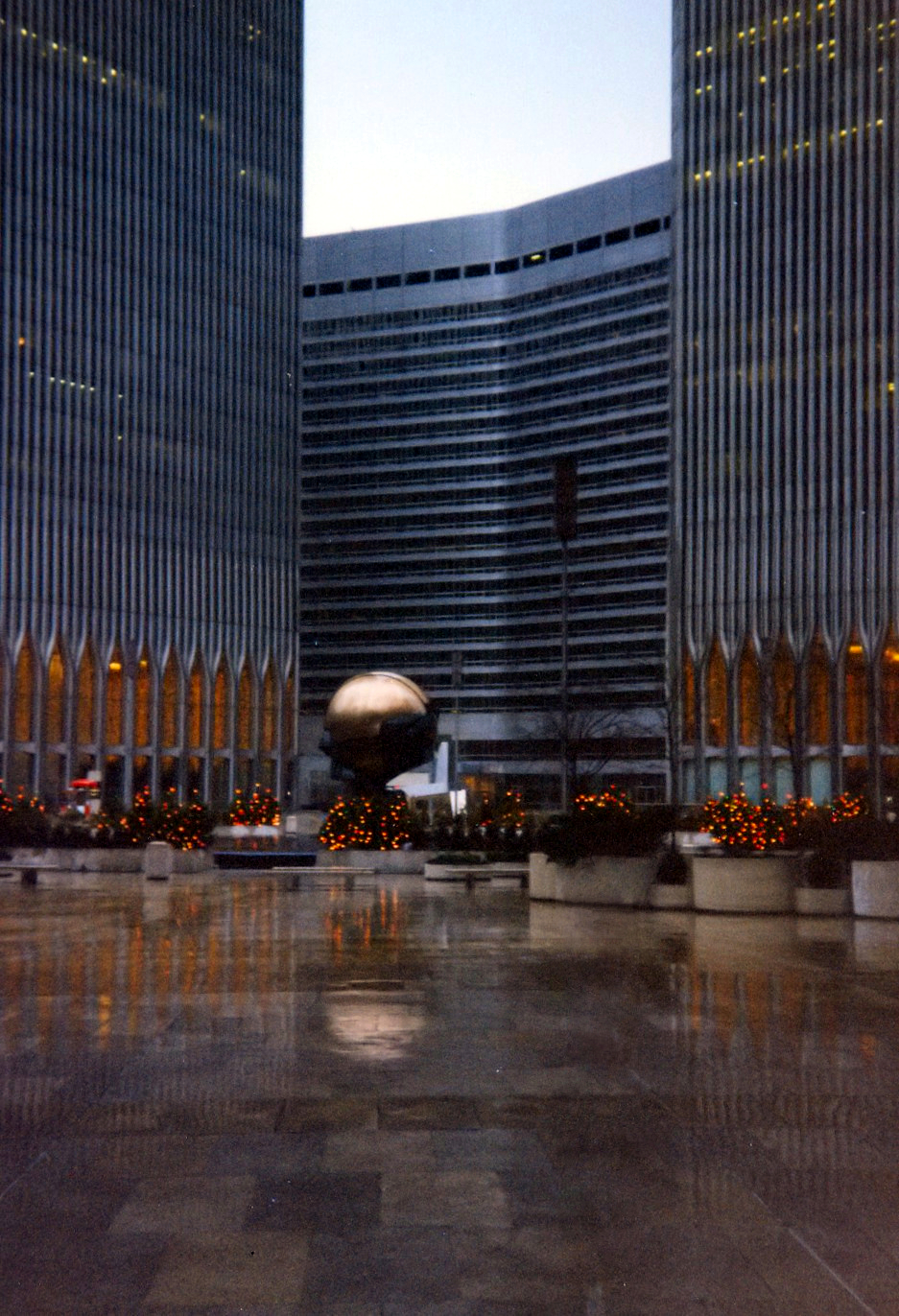
The Austin J. Tobin Plaza in 1995, looking west toward the Vista Hotel in 3 World Trade Center

The original World Trade Center had a five-acre (two-hectare) plaza around which all of the buildings in the complex, including the Twin Towers, were centered. World Trade Center officials had wanted the plaza to be a "contemplative space" or a Zen garden. In 1982, the plaza was renamed after the Port Authority's late chairman, Austin J. Tobin, who authorized the construction of the original World Trade Center. During the summer, the Port Authority installed a portable stage, typically backed up against the North Tower within Tobin Plaza for musicians and performers. The series of concerts and events was called "OnStage at the Twin Towers". At the center of the plaza stood the monumental sculpture The Sphere by German artist Fritz Koenig. The bronze sculpture was located at the center of a fountain, completing a full rotation every 24 hours. The site had other sculptures such as Ideogram, Cloud Fortress, and the 1993 World Trade Center Bombing Memorial fountain. The plaza was pervaded by Muzak background music that came from installed loudspeakers.

For many years, the Plaza was often beset by brisk winds at ground level owing to the Venturi effect between the two towers. Some gusts were so strong that pedestrians' travel had to be aided by ropes. In 1997 Tony May opened an Italian restaurant in the plaza next to 4 World Trade Center called "Gemelli". The following year, he opened another restaurant in an adjacent place called "Pasta Break". On June 9, 1999, the outdoor plaza reopened after undergoing $12 million in renovations. This involved replacing marble pavers with over 40,000 gray and pink granite stones, as well as adding benches, planters, food kiosks, and outdoor dining areas.

=== Top of the World observation deck ===
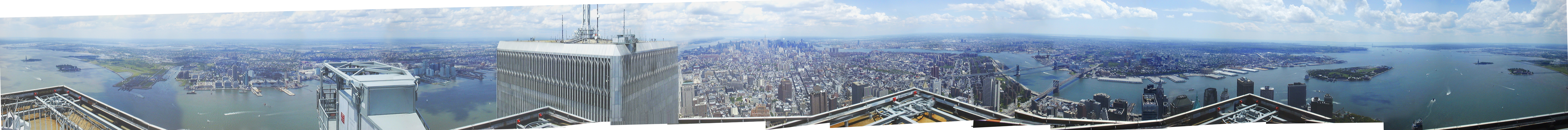
A 360° panoramic view of New York City and surrounding areas from the Top of the World observation deck, circa August 2001. North is near center and the North Tower is left.

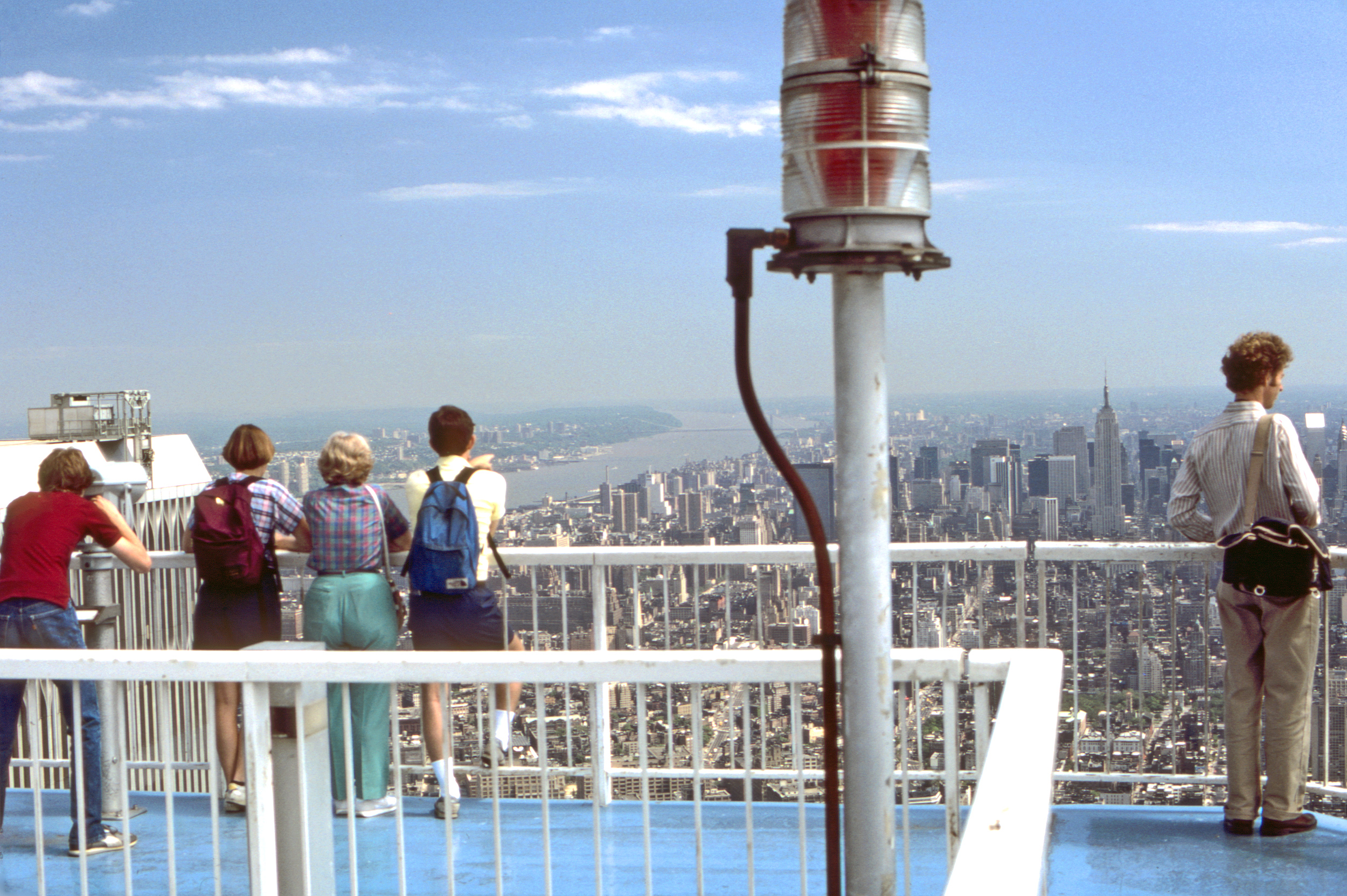
Visitors on the viewing platform on the South Tower's roof, looking north toward Midtown Manhattan in 1984

Although most of the space in the World Trade Center complex was off-limits to the public, the South Tower featured a public glass-enclosed observation deck on the 107th floor called Top of the World and an open-air deck with the height of 110 stories. The observation deck opened in December 1975 and operated from 9:30 a.m. to 11:30 p.m. (June to August) and from 9:30 a.m. to 9:30 p.m. (September to May). After paying an entrance fee in the second floor, visitors were required to pass through security checks added after the 1993 World Trade Center bombing. They were then sent to the 107th-floor indoor observatory at a height of 1,310 feet (400 m) by a dedicated express elevator, which could be only accessed by entering the core. The exterior columns were narrowed to allow 28 inches of window width between them. In 1995, the Port Authority leased operation of the observatory to Ogden Entertainment, which decided to renovate it. On April 30, 1997, the Top of the World tour reopened after renovations were finished. Attractions added to the observation deck included 24 video monitors, which provided descriptions of 44 points of interest in six languages; a theater showing a film of a simulated helicopter tour around the city called "Manhattan Magic"; a model of Manhattan with 750 buildings; a Kodak photo booth and two gift shops. The 107th-floor also featured a subway-themed food court that featured Sbarro Street Station and Nathan's Famous Hot Dogs with a dining area that simulated Central Park.

Weather permitting, visitors could ride two short escalators up from the 107th-floor viewing area to an outdoor platform at a height of 1,377 ft (420 m). On a clear day, visitors could see up to 50 miles (80 km). An anti-suicide fence was placed on the roof itself, with the viewing platform set back and elevated above it, requiring only an ordinary railing. This left the view unobstructed, unlike the observation deck of the Empire State Building.

=== Windows on the World Restaurant ===
Windows on the World, the restaurant on the North Tower's 106th and 107th floors, opened in April 1976. It was developed by restaurateur Joe Baum at a cost of more than $17 million. As well as the main restaurant, two offshoots were located at the top of the North Tower: Hors d'Oeuvrerie (offered a Danish smorgasbord during the day and sushi in the evening) and Cellar in the Sky (a small wine bar). Windows on the World also had a wine school program run by Kevin Zraly, who published a book on the course.

Windows on the World was forced to close following the 1993 World Trade Center bombing as the explosion damaged receiving areas, storage and parking spots used by the restaurant complex. On May 12, 1994, the Joseph Baum & Michael Whiteman Company won the contract to run the restaurants after Windows's former operator, Inhilco, gave up its lease. After its reopening on June 26, 1996, the Greatest Bar on Earth and Cellar in the Sky (reopened after Labor Day) replaced the original restaurant offshoots. In 1999, Cellar in the Sky was changed into an American steakhouse and renamed Wild Blue. In 2000 (its last full year of operation), Windows on the World reported revenues of $37 million, making it the highest-grossing restaurant in the United States. The Skydive Restaurant, which was a 180-seat cafeteria on the 44th floor of 1 WTC conceived for office workers, was also operated by Windows on the World.

In its last iteration, Windows on the World received mixed reviews. Ruth Reichl, a New York Times food critic, said in December 1996 that "nobody will ever go to Windows on the World just to eat, but even the fussiest food person can now be content dining at one of New York's favorite tourist destinations". She gave the restaurant two out of four stars, signifying a "very good" quality. In his 2009 book Appetite, William Grimes wrote that, "At Windows, New York was the main course". In 2014, Ryan Sutton of Eater.com compared the now-destroyed restaurant's cuisine to that of its replacement, One World Observatory. He said, "Windows helped usher in a new era of captive audience dining in that the restaurant was a destination in itself, rather than a lazy by-product of the vital institution it resided in."

=== Other buildings ===
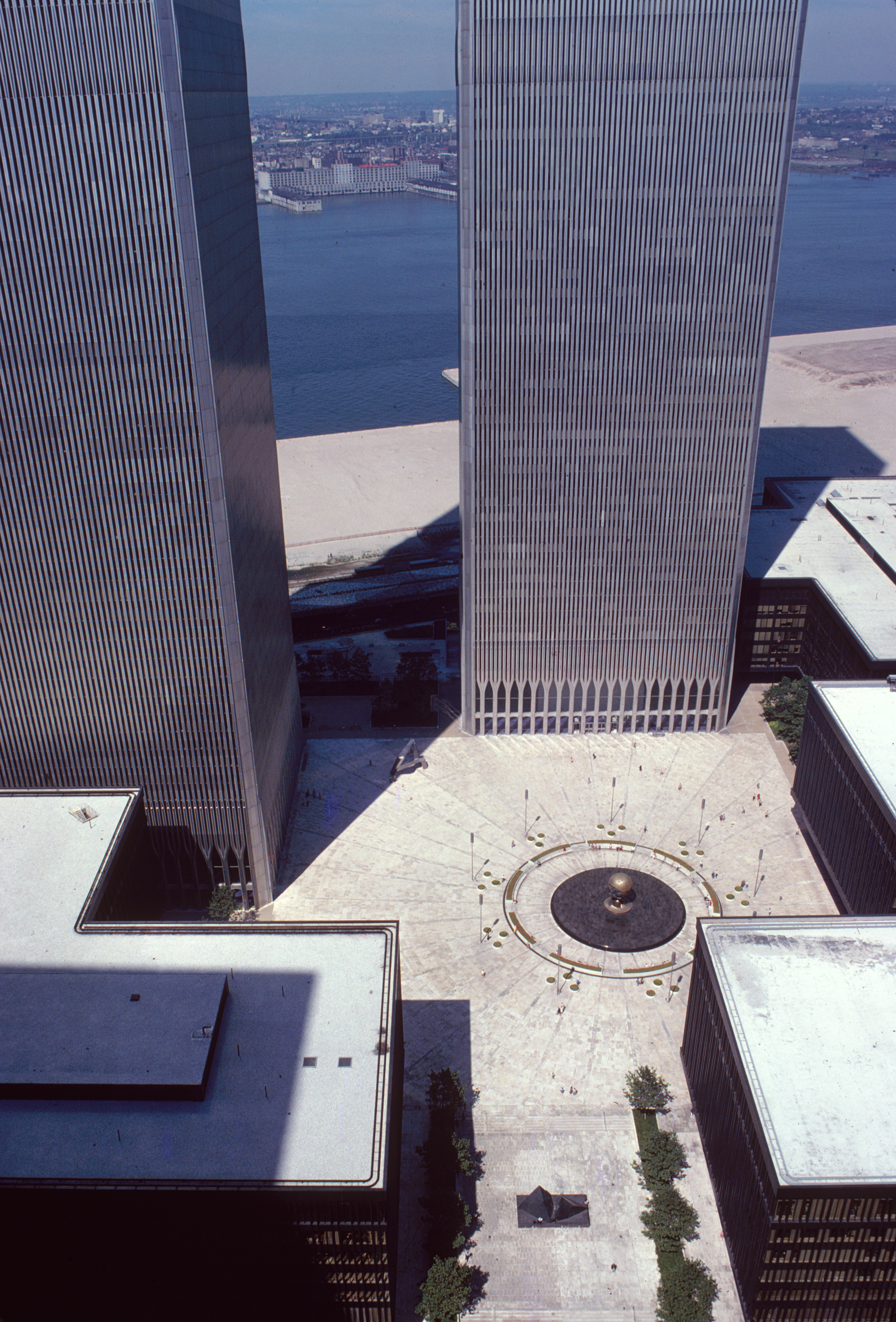
(Counterclockwise) A view of 4, 5 and 6 World Trade Center (the black buildings) surrounding the central plaza and Twin Towers, in 1978

Five smaller buildings stood on the 16-acre (6.5 ha) block. One was the 22-floor hotel, which opened at the southwest corner of the site in 1981 as the Vista Hotel; in 1995, it became the Marriott World Trade Center (3 WTC). Three low-rise buildings (4 WTC, 5 WTC, and 6 WTC), which were steel-framed office buildings, also stood around the plaza. 6 World Trade Center, at the northwest corner, housed the United States Customs Service. 5 World Trade Center was located at the northeast corner above the PATH station, and 4 World Trade Center, located at the southeast corner, housed the U.S. Commodities Exchange. In 1987, construction was completed on a 47-floor office building, 7 World Trade Center, located to the north of the superblock. Beneath the World Trade Center complex was an underground shopping mall. It had connections to various mass transit facilities, including the New York City Subway system and the Port Authority's PATH trains.

One of the world's largest gold depositories was located underneath the World Trade Center, owned by a group of commercial banks. The 1993 bombing detonated close to the vault. Seven weeks after the September 11 attacks, $230 million in precious metals was removed from basement vaults of 4 WTC. This included 3,800 100-Troy-ounce 24 carat gold bars and 30,000 1,000-ounce silver bars.

== Major events ==
=== February 12, 1975 fire ===
On February 12, 1975, a three-alarm fire broke out on the North Tower's 11th floor. It spread to the 9th and 14th floors after igniting telephone cable insulation in a utility shaft that ran vertically between floors. Areas at the furthest extent of the fire were extinguished almost immediately; the original fire was put out in a few hours. Most of the damage was concentrated on the 11th floor, fueled by cabinets filled with paper, alcohol-based fluid for office machines, and other office equipment. Fireproofing protected the steel and there was no structural damage to the tower. In addition to fire damage on the 9th through the 14th floors, the water used to extinguish the fire damaged a few of the floors below. At that time, the World Trade Center had no fire sprinkler systems. On March 12, 1981, the Port Authority announced a $45 million plan to install sprinklers throughout the World Trade Center. A disgruntled custodian, 19-year-old Oswald Adorno, was discovered to have deliberately started the fire and was criminally charged.

=== February 26, 1993 bombing ===
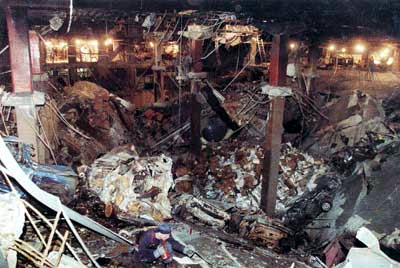
Damage inside the World Trade Center following the 1993 bombing

The first terrorist attack on the World Trade Center occurred on February 26, 1993, at 12:17 p.m. A Ryder truck filled with 1,500 pounds (680 kg) of explosives (planted by Ramzi Yousef) detonated in the North Tower's underground garage. The blast opened a 100 ft (30 m) hole through five sublevels, with the greatest damage occurring on levels B1 and B2 and significant structural damage on level B3. Six people were killed and 1,042 others were injured in the attacks, some from smoke inhalation. Sheikh Omar Abdel Rahman and four other individuals were later convicted for their involvement in the bombing, while Yousef and Eyad Ismoil were convicted for carrying out the bombing. According to a presiding judge, the conspirators' chief aim at the time of the attack was to destabilize the North Tower and send it crashing into the South Tower, toppling both skyscrapers.

Following the bombing, floors that were blown out needed to be repaired to restore the structural support they provided to columns. The slurry wall was in peril following the bombing and the loss of the floor slabs that provided lateral support against pressure from Hudson River water on the other side. The refrigeration plant on sublevel B5, which provided air conditioning to the entire World Trade Center complex, was heavily damaged. After the bombing, the Port Authority installed photoluminescent pathway markings in the stairwells. The fire alarm system for the entire complex needed to be replaced because critical wiring and signaling in the original system were destroyed.

The South Tower did not reopen for tenants until March 18, 1993, while the North Tower remained closed until April 1. The cost to repair both buildings was estimated at $250 million. The Vista International Hotel at 3 World Trade Center remained closed until November 1, 1994, after extensive repairs and renovations that amounted to $65 million. A memorial to the victims of the bombing, a reflecting pool, was installed with the names of those who were killed in the blast. It was later destroyed following the September 11 attacks. The names of the victims of the 1993 bombing are included in the National September 11 Memorial & Museum.

=== Robbery of January 14, 1998 ===
In January 1998, a DeCavalcante crime family member, Ralph Guarino, gained maintenance access to the World Trade Center. He arranged a three-man crew for a heist that netted over $2 million from a Brinks delivery to the North Tower's 11th floor.

=== Other events ===
On the morning of August 7, 1974, Philippe Petit performed a high-wire walk between the North and South Towers of the World Trade Center. For his unauthorized feat 1,312 feet (400 m) above the ground, he rigged a 440-pound (200 kg) cable and used a custom-made 30-foot-long (9.1 m), 55-pound (25 kg) balancing pole. He performed for 45 minutes, making eight passes along the wire. Though Petit was charged with criminal trespass and disorderly conduct, he was later freed in exchange for performing for children in Central Park. The event was the subject of books, a film, and a documentary.

On February 20, 1981, Aerolíneas Argentinas Flight 342, operated by a Boeing 707-387B, nearly hit the transmitting antenna of the North Tower of the World Trade Center in New York during its approach to John F. Kennedy International Airport. The air traffic controller's intervention avoided the impact with less than 90 seconds of distance between the aircraft and the North Tower.

The 1995 PCA world chess championship was played on the 107th floor of the South Tower.

On February 8, 2000, a worker was crushed to death and another was injured by an industrial cooling unit.

On August 11, 2000, an elevator passed its stop at the 78th floor and slammed into the top of the elevator shaft. Eight people were taken to hospitals, and another four were treated at the scene.

=== Proposed lease ===
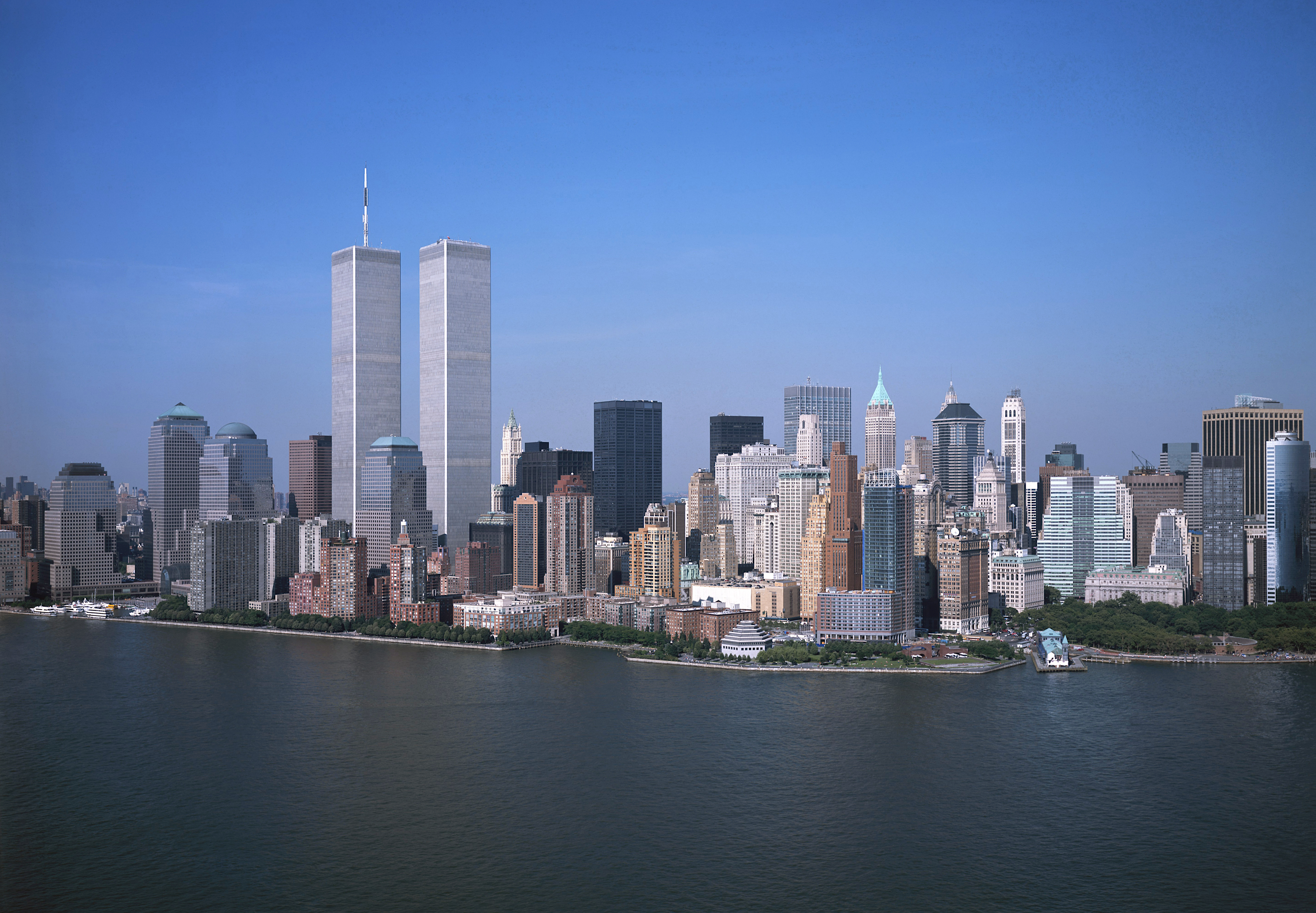
The World Trade Center seen from the Hudson River in July 2001, two months prior to the September 11 attacks

Slow leasing was a hallmark of the old World Trade Center complex. The Twin Towers suffered high vacancy rates for decades. The complex achieved 95% occupancy only in mid-2001.

Following the Port Authority's approved plans to privatize the World Trade Center in the late 1990s, they sought to lease it to a private entity in 2001. Bids for the lease came from Vornado Realty Trust; a joint bid between Brookfield Properties and Boston Properties; and a joint bid by Silverstein Properties and the Westfield Group. Privatizing the World Trade Center would add it to the city's tax rolls and provide funds for other Port Authority projects.

On February 15, 2001, the Port Authority announced that Vornado Realty Trust had won the World Trade Center lease, paying $3.25 billion for the 99-year lease. Vornado outbid Silverstein by $600 million, though Silverstein upped his offer to $3.22 billion. However, Vornado insisted on last-minute changes to the deal, including a shorter 39-year lease, which the Port Authority considered nonnegotiable. Vornado later withdrew and Silverstein's bid for the lease to the World Trade Center was accepted on April 26, 2001, and closed on July 24, 2001.

== Destruction ==
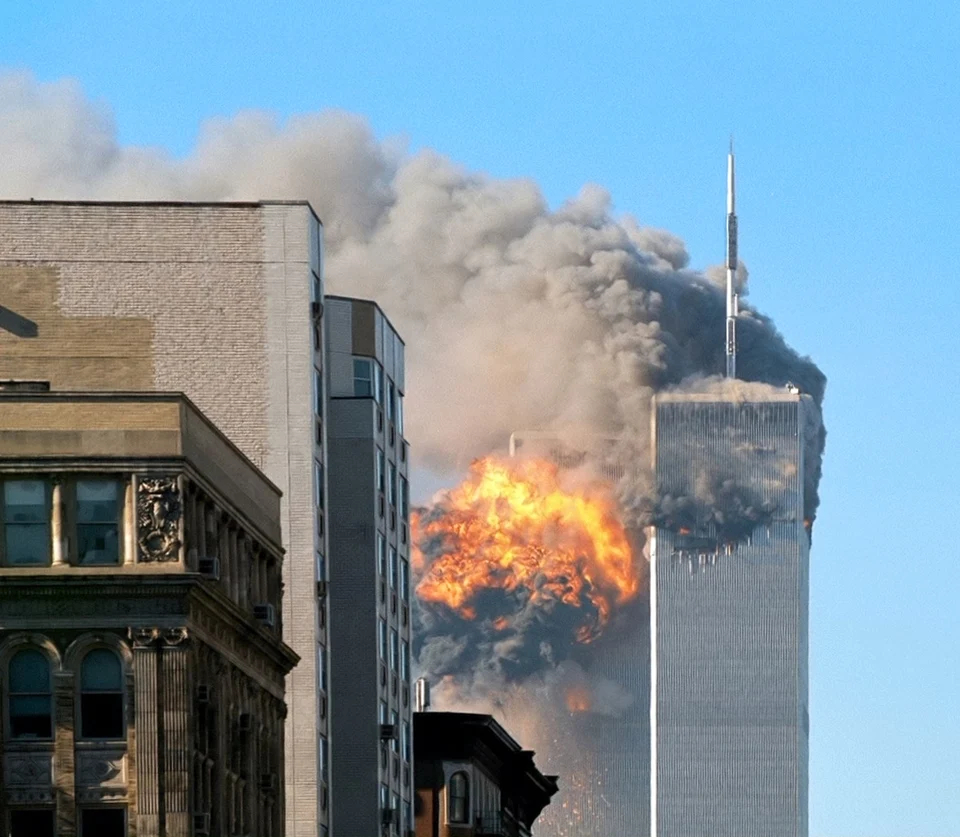
A fireball rises in the immediate aftermath of United Airlines Flight 175 hitting the South Tower during the September 11 attacks.

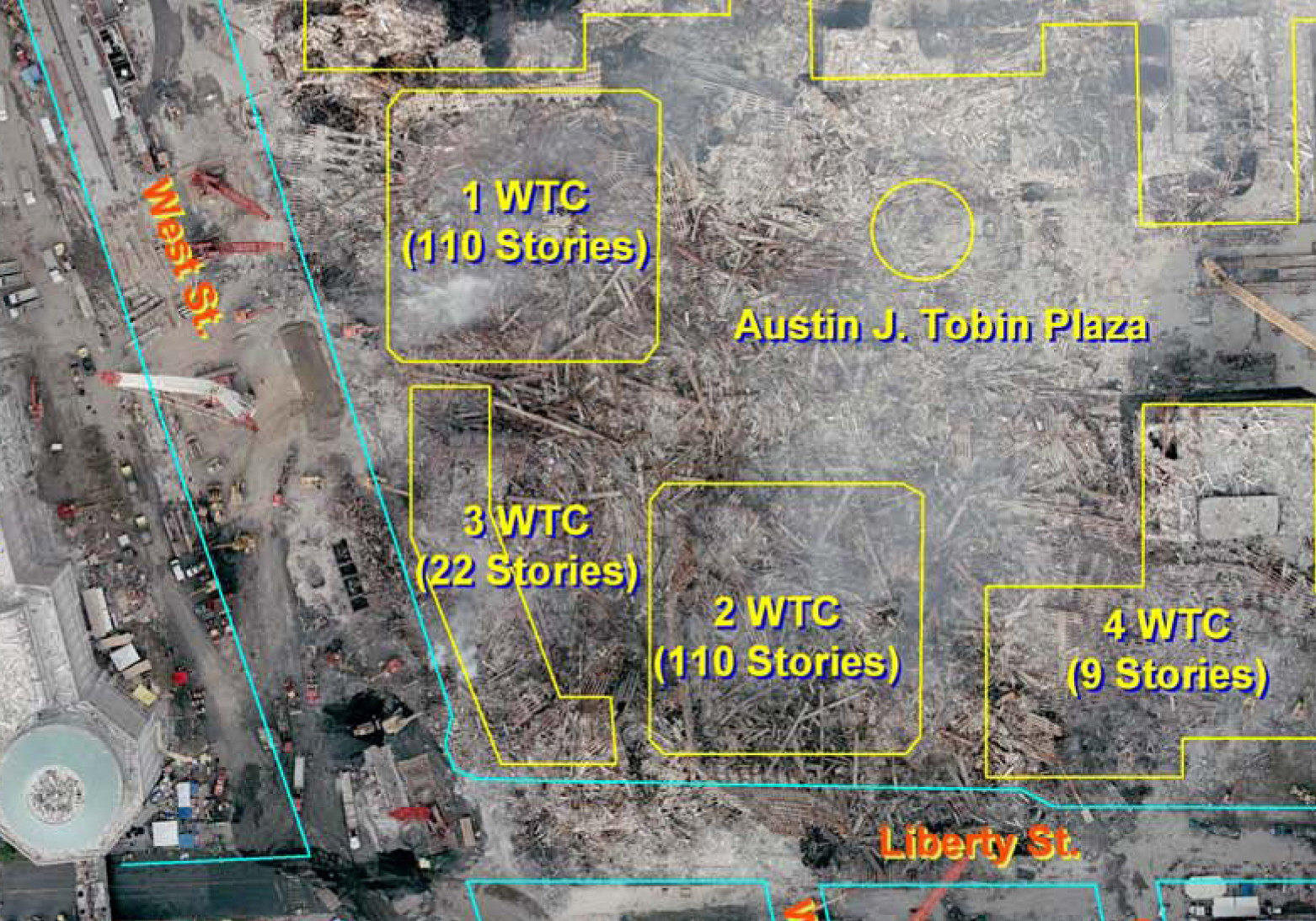
The World Trade Center site after the September 11 attacks seen from above the original building locations (outlined in yellow)

On September 11, 2001, Islamist terrorists hijacked two commercial airliners and crashed them into the Twin Towers. One group led by Mohamed Atta crashed American Airlines Flight 11 into the northern facade of the North Tower at 8:46:40 a.m.; the aircraft struck between the 93rd and 99th floors. Seventeen minutes later, at 9:03:11 a.m., (Note: The exact time is disputed. The 9/11 Commission report says 9:03:11, NIST reports 9:02:59, some other sources report 9:03:02.) a second group led by Marwan al-Shehhi crashed the similarly hijacked United Airlines Flight 175 into the southern facade of the South Tower, striking it between the 77th and 85th floors.

The terrorist organization al-Qaeda, led by Osama bin Laden, carried out the attacks in retaliation for certain aspects of American foreign policy, particularly U.S. support of Israel and the presence of U.S. troops in Saudi Arabia. The damage caused to the North Tower by Flight 11 destroyed any means of escape from above the impact zone, trapping 1,344 people. Flight 175 had a much more off-centered impact compared to Flight 11, and a single stairwell was left intact; however, only a few people managed to descend successfully before the tower collapsed. Although the South Tower was struck lower than the North Tower, thus affecting more floors, a smaller number (fewer than 700) were killed instantly or trapped.

At 9:59 a.m., the South Tower collapsed after burning for approximately 56 minutes. The fire caused steel structural elements, already weakened from the plane's impact, to fail. The North Tower collapsed at 10:28 a.m., after burning for approximately 102 minutes. At 5:20 p.m., 7 World Trade Center began to collapse with the crumbling of the east penthouse and collapsed completely at 5:21 p.m. due to uncontrolled fires causing structural failure.

The Marriott World Trade Center hotel was destroyed during the two towers' collapse. The three remaining buildings in the WTC plaza were extensively damaged by debris and later demolished. The cleanup and recovery process at the World Trade Center site took eight months. A small church, the St. Nicholas Greek Orthodox Church, sat directly south of the towers and was destroyed during the South Tower's collapse. It was rebuilt and opened in December 2022. The Deutsche Bank Building across Liberty Street from the World Trade Center complex was later condemned because of the uninhabitable toxic conditions inside; it was deconstructed, with work completed in early 2011. The Borough of Manhattan Community College's Fiterman Hall at 30 West Broadway was also condemned due to extensive damage, being eventually demolished and completely rebuilt.

In the immediate aftermath of the attacks, media reports suggested that tens of thousands might have been killed in the attacks, as over 50,000 people could have been inside the World Trade Center. The National Institute of Standards and Technology (NIST) estimated approximately 17,400 individuals were in the towers at the time of the attacks. Ultimately, 2,753 death certificates (excluding those for hijackers) were filed relating to the 9/11 attacks.

There were 2,192 civilians who died in and around the World Trade Center, including 658 employees of Cantor Fitzgerald L.P. (an investment bank on the 101st to 105th floors of One World Trade Center), 295 employees of Marsh & McLennan Companies (located immediately below Cantor Fitzgerald on floors 93 to 100, the location of Flight 11's impact), and 175 employees of Aon Corporation. In addition to the civilian deaths, 414 sworn personnel were also killed: 343 New York City Fire Department (FDNY) firefighters, including two FDNY paramedics and one FDNY chaplain, and 71 law enforcement officers, including 37 members of the Port Authority Police Department (PAPD) and 23 members of the New York City Police Department (NYPD). Eight EMS personnel from private agencies also died in the attacks. Ten years after the attacks, the remains of only 1,629 victims had been identified. Of all the people who were still in the towers when they collapsed, only 20 were pulled out alive. After the collapse of the World Trade Center, the World Trade Center site became known as "Ground Zero".

== New World Trade Center ==
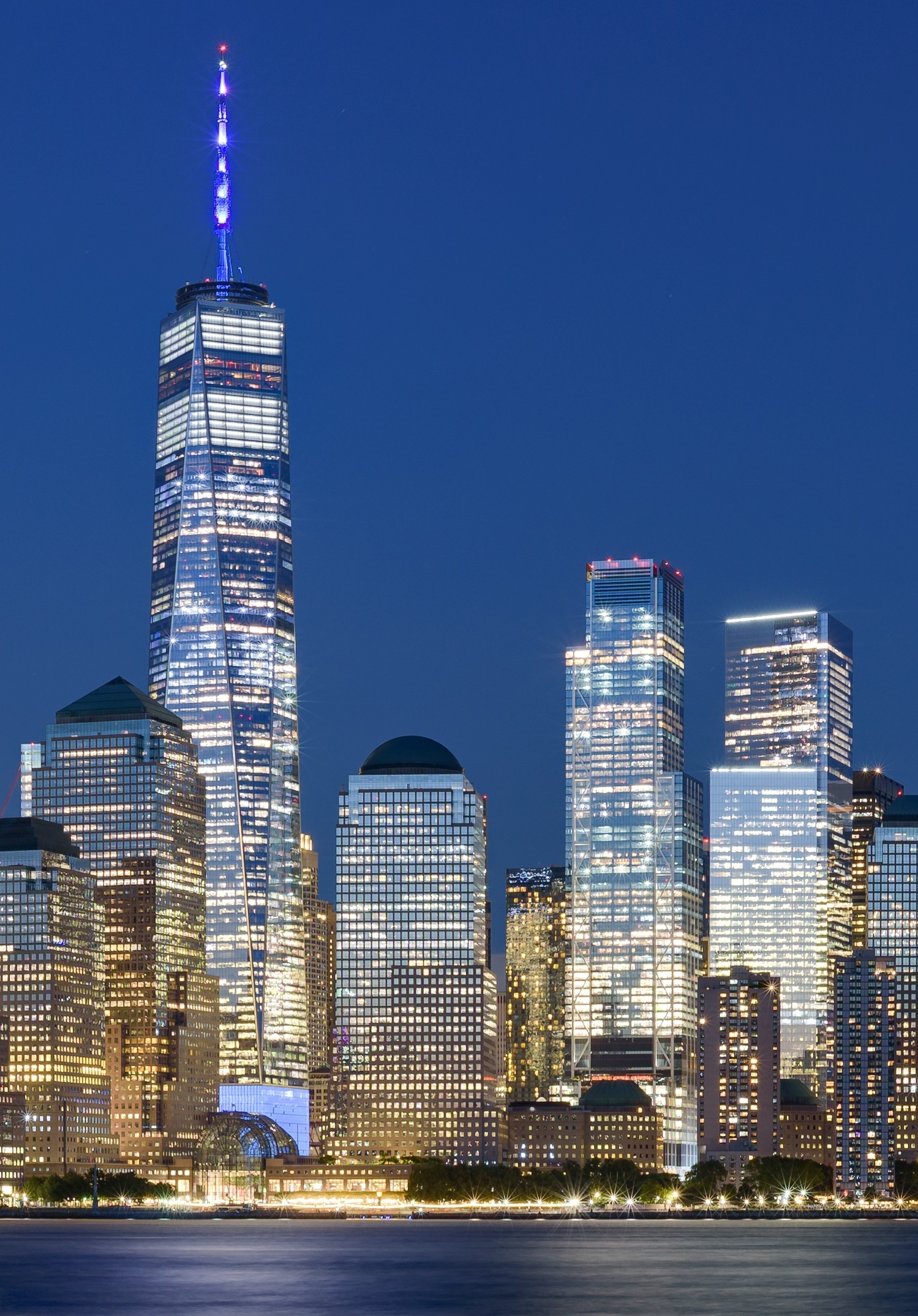
The New World Trade Center in September 2020

Over the following years, plans were devised for the reconstruction of the World Trade Center. The Lower Manhattan Development Corporation (LMDC), established in November 2001 to oversee the rebuilding process, organized competitions to select a site plan and memorial design. Memory Foundations, designed by Daniel Libeskind, was selected as the master plan; however, substantial changes were made to the design.

The first new building at the site was 7 WTC, which opened on May 23, 2006. The memorial section of the National September 11 Memorial & Museum opened on September 11, 2011, and the museum opened on May 21, 2014. 1 WTC opened on November 3, 2014; 4 WTC opened on November 13, 2013; and 3 WTC opened on June 11, 2018.

In November 2013, according to an agreement made with Silverstein Properties Inc., the new 2 WTC would not be built to its full height until sufficient space was leased to make the building financially viable. Above-ground construction of 5 WTC was also suspended due to a lack of tenants as well as disputes between the Port Authority and the Lower Manhattan Development Corporation. In mid-2015, Silverstein Properties revealed plans for a redesigned 2 WTC, to be designed by Bjarke Ingels and completed by 2020 with News Corp as anchor tenant. In February 2026, plans to resume construction of 2 World Trade Center were announced after American Express agreed to become that building's anchor tenant; at the time, the building was to be complete in 2031.

== Aftermath and legacy ==
=== Reception ===
Plans to build the World Trade Center were controversial. Its site was the location of Radio Row, home to hundreds of commercial and industrial tenants, property owners, small businesses, and approximately 100 residents, many of whom fiercely resisted forced relocation. A group of affected small businesses sought an injunction challenging the Port Authority's power of eminent domain. The case made its way through the court system to the United States Supreme Court, which refused to hear the case.

Private real-estate developers and members of the Real Estate Board of New York, led by Empire State Building owner Lawrence A. Wien, expressed concerns about this much "subsidized" office space going on the open market, competing with the private sector, when there was already a glut of vacancies; the World Trade Center itself was not rented out completely until after 1979, and only then due to subsidies. Another critic questioned whether the Port Authority should have taken on a project described by some as a "mistaken social priority".

The World Trade Center's design aesthetics attracted criticism from the American Institute of Architects and other groups. Lewis Mumford, author of The City in History and other works on urban planning, criticized the project, describing it and other new skyscrapers as "just glass-and-metal filing cabinets". The Twin Towers were described as looking similar to "the boxes that the Empire State Building and the Chrysler Building came in". Cultural critic Paul Fussell dismissed the Twin Towers for being "charmless, merely tall, and huge blunt buildings" in his 1991 book BAD Or, The Dumbing of America, adding that they were "brutal and despotic. Dull and witless, expressive only of dumb, raw power, they are widely touted as among the major achievements of the late twentieth century." In his 1996 book Home from Nowhere, James Howard Kunstler wrote in regard to skyscrapers like the Twin Towers and the Empire State Building that "it was probably necessary for mankind's collective ego to prove that such buildings . . . could be built," but he added that they were not worth the "distortions of population density" that they produced, and that they also "overload neighborhoods and strain the infrastructure."

In his book The Pentagon of Power, Lewis Mumford described the World Trade Center as an "example of the purposeless giantism and technological exhibitionism that are now eviscerating the living tissue of every great city". Other critics disliked the twin towers' narrow office windows, which were 18 inches (46 cm) wide and framed by pillars that restricted views on each side to narrow slots. Activist and sociologist Jane Jacobs argued the waterfront should be kept open for New Yorkers to enjoy. Retrospectively, the American Institute of Architects ranked the World Trade Center complex as 19th among 150 buildings in its List of America's Favorite Architecture, published in 2007.

=== On the surrounding community ===
The original World Trade Center created a superblock that cut through the area's street grid, isolating the complex from the rest of the community. The Port Authority had demolished several streets to make way for the towers within the World Trade Center. The project involved combining the 12-block area bounded by Vesey, Church, Liberty, and West Streets on the north, east, south, and west, respectively. 7 World Trade Center was built on the superblock's north side in the late 1980s over another block of Greenwich Street. The building acted as a physical barrier separating Tribeca to the north and the Financial District to the south. The underground mall at the World Trade Center also drew shoppers away from surrounding streets.

The project was seen as being monolithic and overambitious, with the design having had no public input. By contrast, the rebuilding plans had significant public input. The public supported rebuilding a street grid through the World Trade Center site. One of the rebuilding proposals included building an enclosed shopping street along the path of Cortlandt Street, one of the streets demolished to make room for the original World Trade Center. The Port Authority ultimately decided to rebuild Cortlandt, Fulton, and Greenwich Streets, which were destroyed during the original World Trade Center's construction.

=== As popular culture icon ===
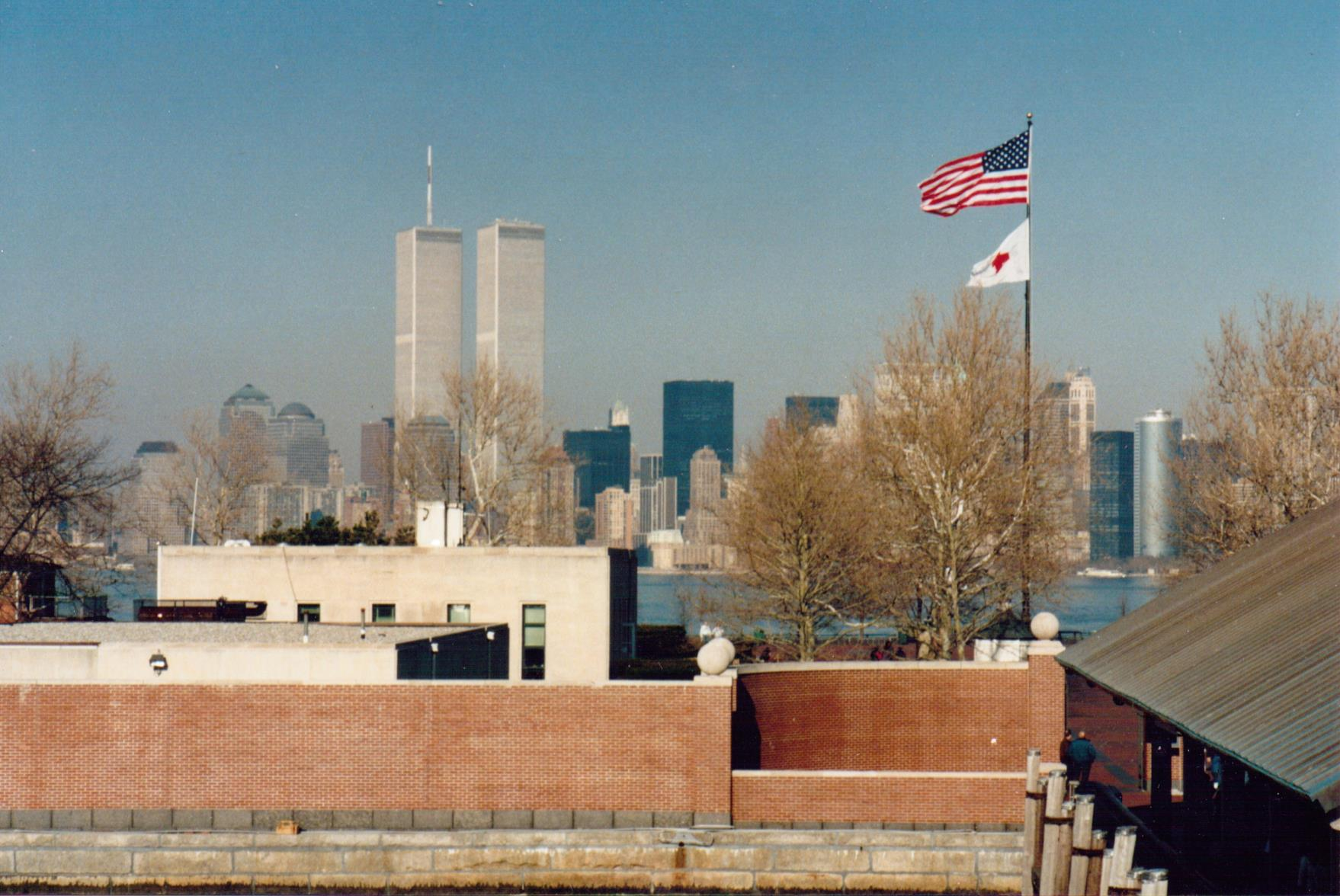
The World Trade Center seen from Liberty Island in 1995

View of Manhattan from the Brooklyn Bridge, through which the Twin Towers of the World Trade Center are visible

Before its destruction, the World Trade Center was a New York City icon, and the Twin Towers were the centerpiece that represented the entire complex. They were used in film and TV projects as "establishing shots", standing for New York City as a whole. In 1999, one writer noted: "Nearly every guidebook in New York City lists the Twin Towers among the city's top ten attractions." Among the films that used the complex as a filming location was Sidney Lumet's The Wiz (1978), where the World Trade Center was used to represent Emerald City. Some films such as King Kong (1976) used the World Trade Center's Twin Towers as a setting for lengthy scenes, while others such as Independence Day (1996) and Home Alone 2: Lost in New York (1992) depicted the complex only briefly.

There were several high-profile events that occurred at the World Trade Center. The most notable was held at the original WTC in 1974. French high wire acrobatic performer Philippe Petit walked between the two towers on a tightrope, as shown in the documentary film Man on Wire (2008) and depicted in the feature film The Walk (2015). Petit walked between the towers eight times on a steel cable. In 1975, Owen J. Quinn base-jumped from the roof of the North Tower and safely landed on the plaza between the buildings. Quinn claimed that he was trying to publicize the plight of the poor. On May 26, 1977, Brooklyn toymaker George Willig scaled the exterior of the South Tower. He later said, "It looked unscalable; I thought I'd like to try it." Six years later, high-rise firefighting and rescue advocate Dan Goodwin successfully climbed the outside of the North Tower on May 30, 1983 to call attention to the inability to rescue people potentially trapped in the upper floors of skyscrapers. In 1991, an amateur BASE jumper named John Vincent successfully smuggled a parachute past security, leaped from the roof of the South Tower's observation deck and landed safely on a nearby street.

The complex was featured in numerous works of popular culture; in 2006, it was estimated that the World Trade Center had appeared in some form in 472 films. Several iconic meanings were attributed to the World Trade Center. Film critic David Sterritt, who lived near the complex, said that the World Trade Center's appearance in the 1978 film Superman "summarized a certain kind of American grandeur [...] the grandeur, I would say, of sheer American powerfulness". Remarking on the towers' destruction in the 1996 film Independence Day, Sterritt said: "The Twin Towers have been destroyed in various disaster movies that were made before 9/11. That became something that you couldn't do even retroactively after 9/11." Other motifs included romance, depicted in the 1988 film Working Girl, and corporate avarice, depicted in Wall Street (1987) and The Bonfire of the Vanities (1990). Comic books, animated cartoons, television shows, video games, and music videos also used the complex as a setting.

==== After the September 11 attacks ====
After the September 11 attacks, some movies and TV shows deleted scenes or episodes set within the World Trade Center. For example, The Simpsons episode "The City of New York vs. Homer Simpson", which first aired in 1997, was removed from syndication after the attacks because a scene showed the World Trade Center. Songs that mentioned the World Trade Center were no longer aired on radio, and the release dates of some films, such as the 2001–2002 films Sidewalks of New York; People I Know; and Spider-Man were delayed so producers could remove film and poster scenes that included the World Trade Center. The 2001 film Kissing Jessica Stein, which was shown at the 2001 Toronto International Film Festival the day before the attacks, had to be modified before its general public release so the filmmakers could delete scenes that depicted the World Trade Center.

Other episodes and films mentioned the attacks directly or depicted the World Trade Center in alternate contexts. The production of some family-oriented films was also sped up due to a large demand for the genre after the attacks. Demand for horror and action films decreased, but within a short time demand returned to normal. By the attacks' first anniversary, over sixty "memorial films" had been created. Filmmakers were criticized for removing scenes related to the World Trade Center. Rita Kempley of The Washington Post said "if we erase the towers from our art, we erase it [sic] from our memories". Author Donald Langmead compared the phenomenon to the 1949 novel Nineteen Eighty-Four, where historic mentions of events are retroactively "rectified". Other filmmakers such as Michael Bay, who directed the 1998 film Armageddon, opposed retroactively removing references to the World Trade Center based on post-9/11 attitudes.

Oliver Stone's film World Trade Center—the first movie that specifically examined the attacks' effects on the World Trade Center as contrasted with the effects elsewhere—was released in 2006. Several years after the attacks, works such as "The City of New York vs. Homer Simpson" were placed back in syndication. The National September 11 Museum has preserved many of the works that feature depictions of the original World Trade Center.

== Logo ==
1973–1993 and 1993–2001 logos of the World Trade Center

The World Trade Center used two different logos over its lifetime. The first logo, used from 1973 to 1993, consisted of two open rectangles, one of which was upside down. When the complex reopened after the 1993 bombing, a new logo was unveiled, consisting of the towers encircled by a globe. This logo was found throughout the complex, and was printed on commemorative mugs given out to tenants with the caption "Welcome back to the World Trade Center".

== See also ==
- Artwork damaged or destroyed in the September 11 attacks
- List of tallest freestanding steel structures
- List of tallest freestanding structures

Records
Preceded by Empire State Building	Tallest building in the world 1970–1974 (North Tower)	Succeeded by Willis Tower
Preceded by Empire State Building	Tallest building in the United States; 1970–1974 (North Tower)	Succeeded by Willis Tower
Preceded by Empire State Building	Tallest building with the most floors 1970–2001	Succeeded by Willis Tower
Preceded by Empire State Building	Tallest building in New York City; 1970–2001 (North Tower)	Succeeded by Empire State Building
Preceded by Empire State Building	Tallest building with the most floors ever 1970–2008	Succeeded by Burj Khalifa
Preceded by Inaugural Holder	Tallest twin towers in the world July 19, 1971 – March 11, 1996	Succeeded by Petronas Towers
