= Four Seasons Hotel New York Downtown =

Skyscraper in Manhattan, New York

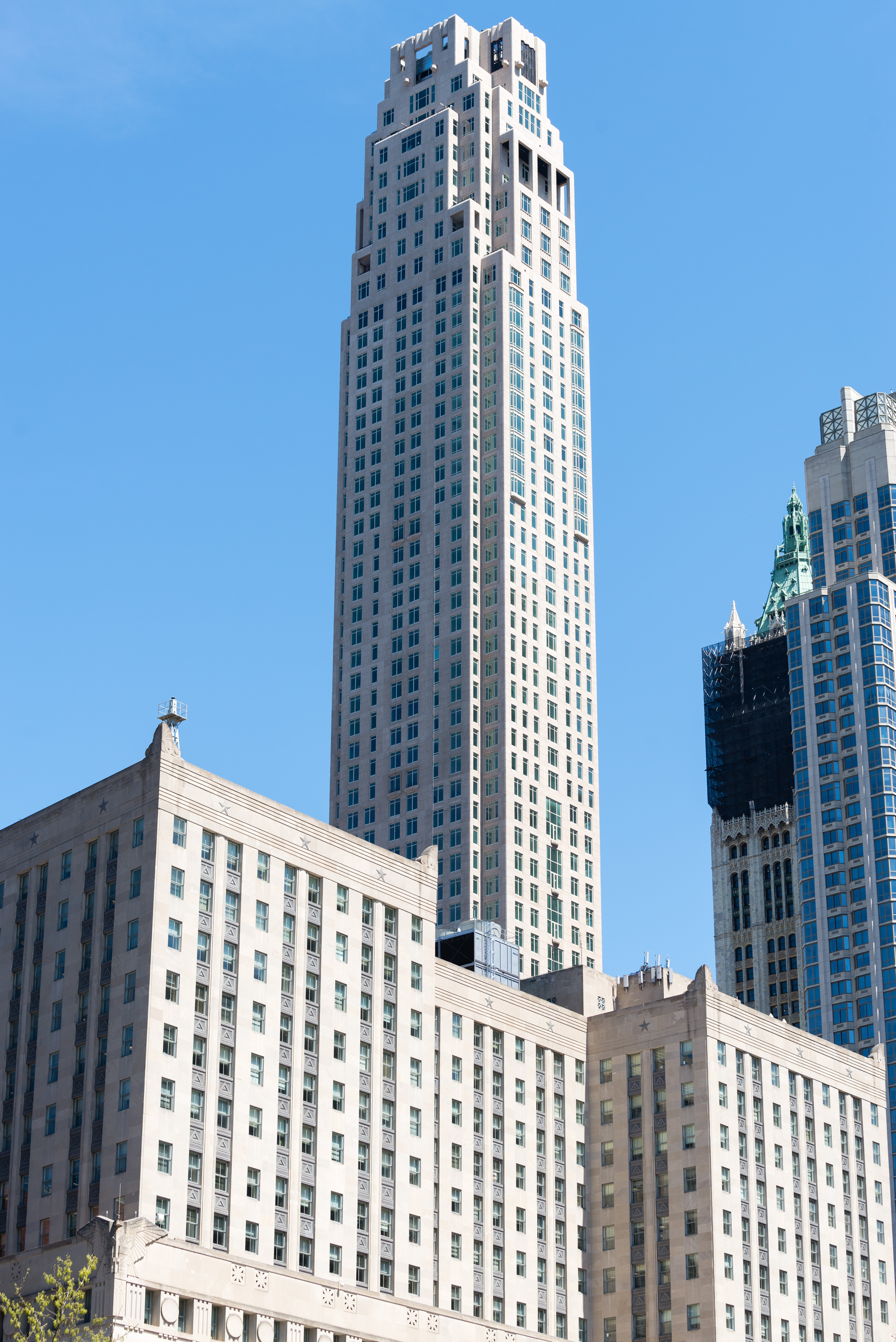
- The Four Seasons Hotel
- Interactive map of the Four Seasons Hotel New York Downtown area
- Alternative names: 30 Park Place; 99 Church Street; Four Seasons Private Residences New York Downtown

General information
- Status: Completed
- Type: Residential, hotel
- Architectural style: New classical
- Coordinates: 40°42′46″N 74°00′33″W
- Construction started: November 2007
- Completed: 2016
- Opening: March 22, 2016

Height
- Antenna spire: 926 ft (282 m)
- Roof: 926 ft (282 m)
- Top floor: 869 ft (265 m)

Technical details
- Floor count: 82
- Floor area: 683,002 ft^{2} (63,453.0 m^{2})

Design and construction
- Architect: Robert A. M. Stern
- Developer: Silverstein Properties
- Structural engineer: WSP Cantor Seinuk
- Main contractor: Tishman Construction

The Four Seasons Hotel New York Downtown, also known as 30 Park Place, is a hotel and residential skyscraper in Tribeca, Manhattan, New York City. At 926 feet (282 m), the tower is one of the tallest residential buildings in Lower Manhattan. The top floors of the 82-story building, known as the Four Seasons Private Residences New York Downtown, have 157 residences, ranging from one to six bedrooms, all reached through a dedicated residential lobby at 30 Park Place. Below is a 189-room Four Seasons Hotel, with its own lobby on Barclay Street, which opened in September 2016.

== History ==
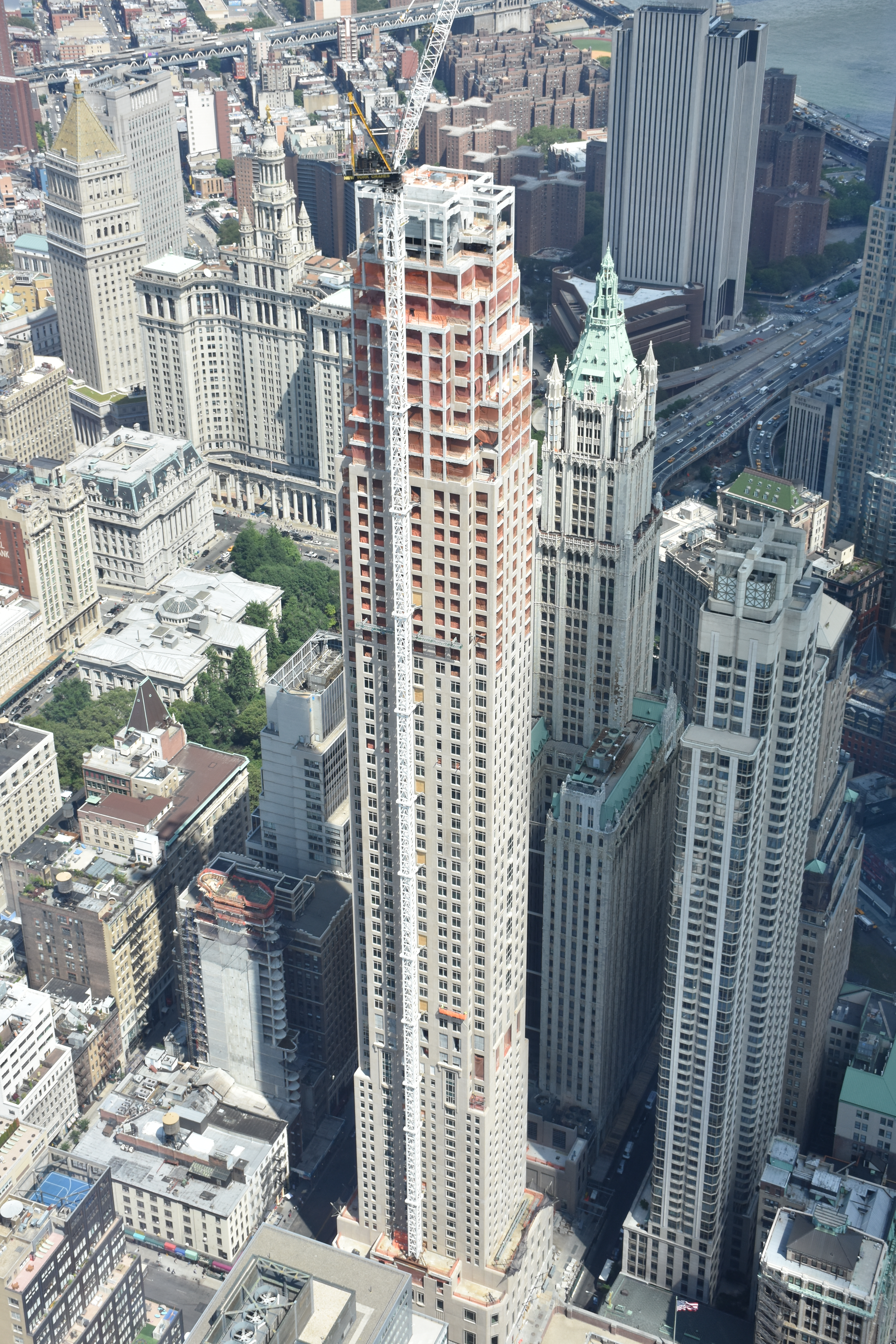
30 Park Place under construction, as seen from One World Observatory in 2015

Larry Silverstein's Silverstein Properties, developer of the nearby World Trade Center, purchased the property at 99 Church Street for $170 million from Moody's Corporation in November 2006. At the time, the site was occupied by an 11-story, 441,000-square-foot (41,000 m^{2}) office building built in 1951 that served as Moody's headquarters. However, Moody's had recently agreed to move to Silverstein's 7 World Trade Center which would leave the Church Street building vacant in 2007. At the time, the developer and CalSTRS planned to tear down the offices and replace it with a 58-story residential tower.

In March 2007, Silverstein officially unveiled plans for a 60-story, mixed-use tower on the site that would include a boutique hotel on the building's first 20 stories. The 2011 Driehaus Prize winner Robert A. M. Stern was revealed as the architect in November 2007 when Silverstein announced that the building would begin construction in mid 2008 for an early 2011 completion. Demolition of the previous 11-story building began in November 2007. The building's 80-story, 912-foot-tall (278 m) design was showcased in January 2008 during which Four Seasons Hotels and Resorts (partly owned by Cascade Investment controlled by Bill Gatеs) was revealed as the hotel operator, along with the official address of 30 Park Place. However, by March 2009 the project was on hold as Silverstein was unable to acquire financing during the 2008 financial crisis.

Larry Silverstein announced a new start date of 2012 and a completion date of 2014 at the Bloomberg Real Estate Briefing in November 2010. In May 2013, Silverstein Properties secured $660 million for construction financing from UK hedge fund The Children's Investment Fund. Tishman Construction managed the project. Construction began in the fall of 2013, the building topped out in early 2015, and installation of the exterior and windows was finished in August 2015. The hotel celebrated its grand opening on September 19, 2016. At the time it was the second tallest residential building in Downtown Manhattan, after 70 Pine Street.

== Amenities ==
Four Seasons Hotel New York Downtown features 189 guest rooms and suites, a 75-foot lap pool, a spa with seven treatment rooms, 24-hour business services, and a 24-hour gym. Just off the lobby is CUT by Wolfgang Puck, the celebrity chef's first New York City restaurant.

== See also ==
- List of tallest buildings in New York City
- Silverstein Properties
