= Americas Tower =

Office skyscraper in Manhattan, New York

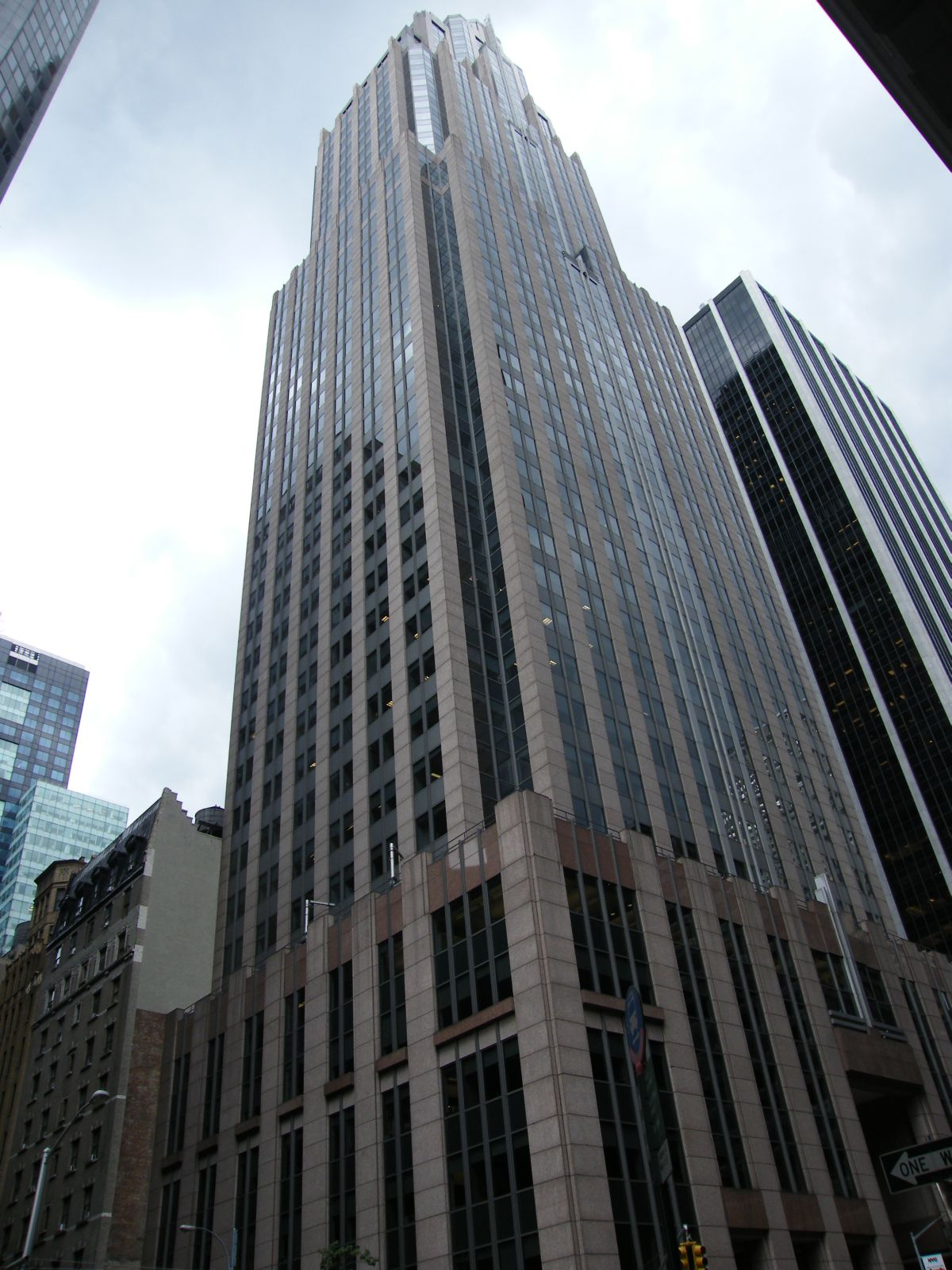

General information
- Type: Office
- Location: Manhattan, New York, United States
- Coordinates: 40°45′26″N 73°58′58″W
- Construction started: 1989
- Completed: 1992
- Opening: 1992
- Owner: Norges Bank Investment Management

Height
- Roof: 692 feet (211 m)

Technical details
- Floor count: 50
- Floor area: 933,995 sq ft (86,771.0 m^{2})
- Lifts/elevators: 45

Design and construction
- Architect: Swanke Hayden Connell Architects
- Developer: Americas Tower Partners

Americas Tower, also known as 1177 Avenue of the Americas, is a 50-story, 692-foot (211 m) skyscraper in Midtown Manhattan, New York City, at Sixth Avenue and 45th Street. Construction began in 1989 and was expected to be completed in 1991. This schedule was altered when construction was halted in December 1989 due to lawsuits. In February 1991, construction resumed. Swanke Hayden Connell Architects designed the tower in a mixture of the art deco and postmodern styles. The facade is made of polished reddish-pink granite. The tower was sold in 2002 for US$500 million to a group of German-American investors. Silverstein Properties and CalSTRS resold the building to Norges Bank Investment Management in 2025 for US$542.6 million.

== Tenants ==
- The Weather Channel (floor 6)
- Kramer Levin Naftalis & Frankel (concourse and floors 22–30)
- Practising Law Institute (floor 2)
- Turing Pharmaceuticals (floor 39)
- Starr Insurance (floor 7 & 8)

== See also ==
- List of tallest buildings in New York City
