= Silverstein Properties =

American real estate development firm

Silverstein Properties Inc.
- Type: Private
- Industry: Real estate development
- Founded: 1957; 69 years ago
- Founder: Larry Silverstein
- Headquarters: 7 World Trade Center, Manhattan, New York, U.S.
- Area served: Worldwide
- Number of employees: 500+
- Website: silversteinproperties.com

Silverstein Properties Inc. is an American family-held, full-service real estate development, investment and management firm based in New York City. Founded in 1957 by Chairman Larry Silverstein, the company specializes in developing, acquiring, and managing office, residential, hotel, retail, and mixed-use properties. The firm is New York City's fifth-largest commercial landlord.

Silverstein Properties' real estate business has been one of the largest investors in New York City real estate over the past fifty years, having developed, owned and managed more than 40 million square feet of office, residential, hotel and retail properties including the new World Trade Center, 30 Park Place (Four Seasons Private Residences New York Downtown), 120 Wall Street, Equitable Building, and Americas Tower.

Silverstein Properties is headquartered at 7 World Trade Center in Manhattan, New York City.

== Company ==
Silverstein Properties has developed, owned, and managed more than 40 million SF (3.25 million m^{2}) of commercial, residential, and retail space. Prior to joining the firm, Silverstein Properties' executives and professionals developed in excess of 100 million SF (9.3 million m^{2}) in the United States and abroad.

Silverstein Properties' portfolio includes 13.4 million square feet of office, residential and retail properties and $10 billion of current development. Notable past and current projects include:

- Four Seasons Resort at Walt Disney World
- Four Seasons Hotel and Private Residences at 30 Park Place
- World Trade Center complex in downtown Manhattan (7 World Trade Center, 4 World Trade Center, 3 World Trade Center, 2 World Trade Center)
- One West End Luxury Condominiums
- 120 Wall Street
- 619 West 54th Street
- River Place (Manhattan)
- Equitable Building
- Silver Towers (Manhattan)
- Salmon Tower Building (Manhattan)
- 1177 Avenue of the Americas
- 529 Fifth Avenue
- 521 Fifth Avenue
- 530 Fifth Avenue
- Ronald Reagan Office Building
- 711 Fifth Avenue
- 105 Madison Avenue
- Beekman Tower
- 11 West 42nd Street
- 520 West 41st Street
- Disney Campus 125 West End Avenue
- Disney Campus 320 West 66th Street
- Disney Campus 147 Columbus Avenue
- Disney Campus 149 Columbus Avenue
- Disney Campus 77 West 66th Street
- Disney Campus 47 West 66th Street
- Disney Campus 7 West 66th Street
- Disney Campus 30 West 67th Street
- Stratos Office Center
- U.S. Bank Tower (Los Angeles)
- Ethos
- Qianhai Economic Zone Shenzhen, China
- Several projects in Washington, D.C., Poland, and mainland China

== New York casino bid ==
The Avenir
- Location: Hell’s Kitchen New York City, New York
- Opened: cancelled
- No. of rooms: 1,000
- Casino type: Resort
- Owner: Silverstein Properties
- Operating license holder: Rush Street Gaming; Greenwood Gaming and Entertainment
- Website: https://www.theavenir.com/

Silverstein Properties was one of eight bidders looking to open a casino in downstate New York. Silverstein Properties had proposed building a 1,000 room casino hotel called The Avenir in Hell's Kitchen, in conjunction with Hyatt International. In May of 2025, the design of the hotel was revealed. If built, the building will be 785 feet tall. Silverstein Properties submitted their bid for a commercial casino license on June 27, 2025. On September 17, 2025, a community advisory committee, appointed by the state government, voted against the proposed development, thus ending the proposal.

== Recognition ==
Since 2012, SPI has been ranked 33rd of the "Best Places to Work in New York City" by Crain's.
