= World Trade Center site =

Region in New York City

Coordinates: 40°42′42″N 74°00′48″W

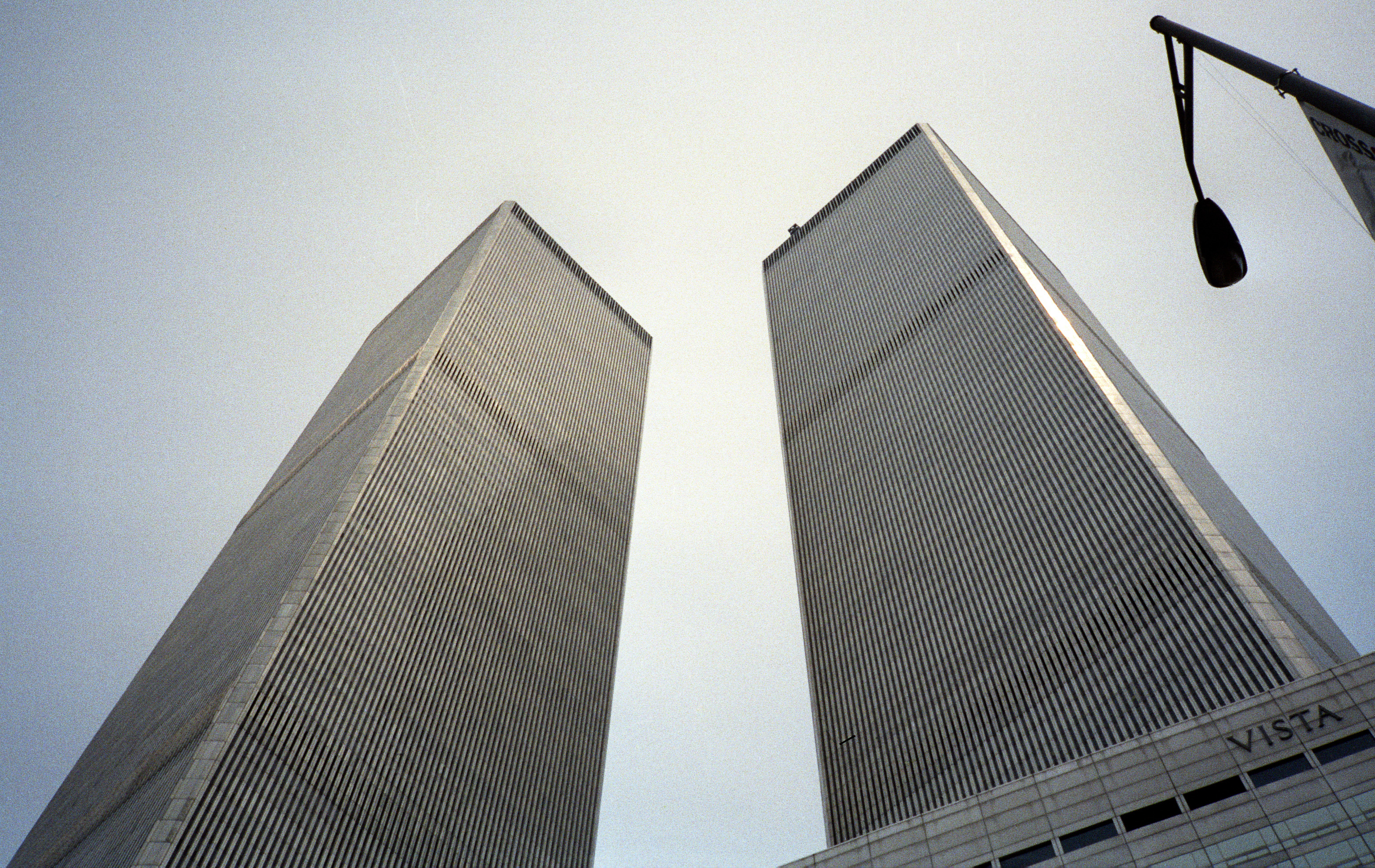
The Twin Towers of the World Trade Center in 1992

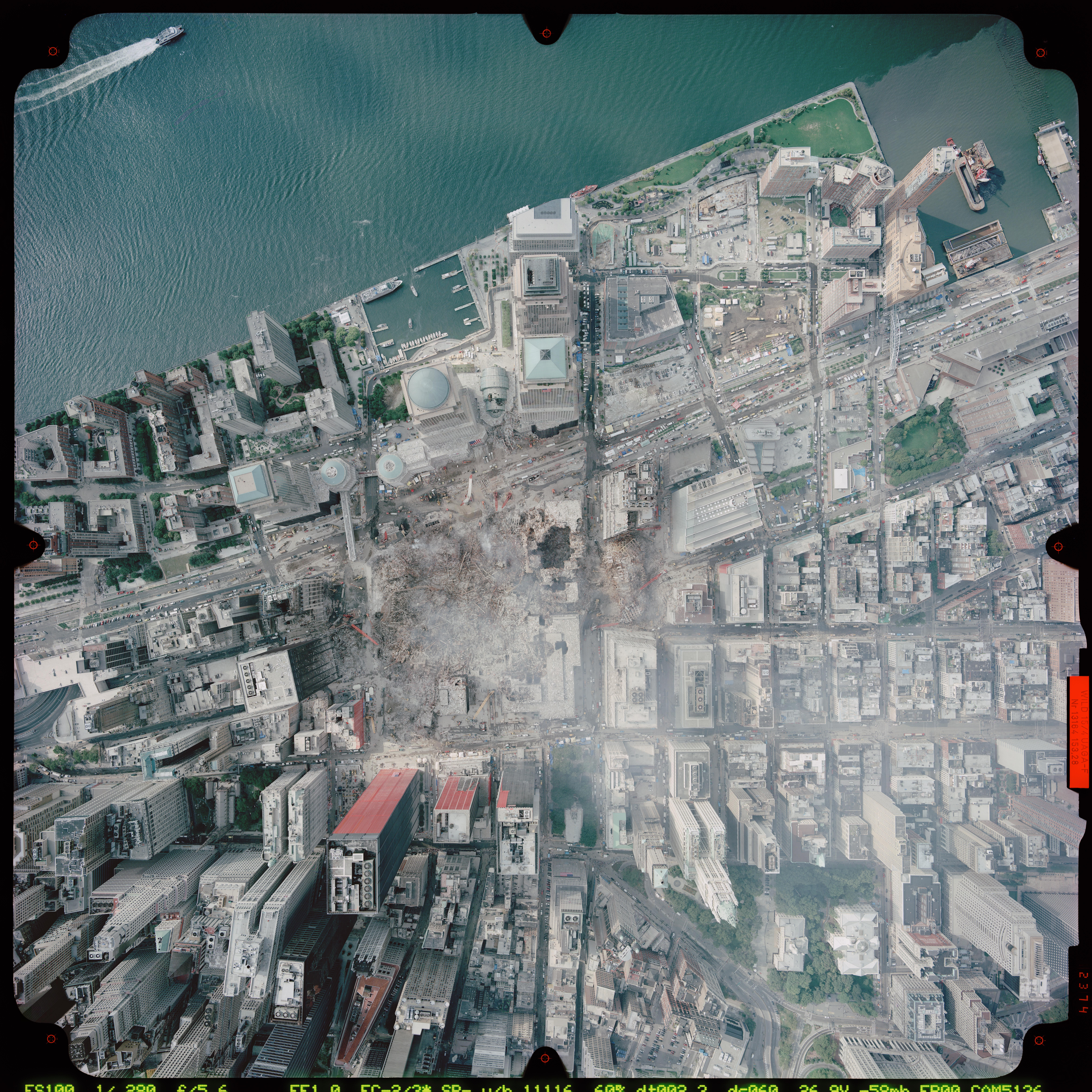
The site as it appeared 12 days after 9/11

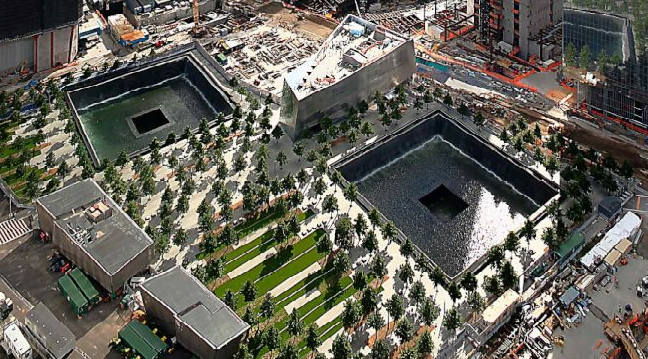
The site as it appeared in 2012: The pools lie on the approximate site of each tower. Left is the North Tower and right is the South Tower.

The World Trade Center site, often referred to as "Ground Zero" or "the Pile" immediately after the September 11 attacks, is a 14.6-acre (5.9 ha) area in Lower Manhattan in New York City. The site is bounded by Vesey Street to the north, the West Side Highway to the west, Liberty Street to the south, and Church Street to the east. The Port Authority of New York and New Jersey (PANYNJ) owns the site's land (except for 7 World Trade Center). The original World Trade Center complex stood on the site until it was destroyed in the September 11 attacks.

The Port Authority, Silverstein Properties, and the Lower Manhattan Development Corporation (LMDC) have overseen the reconstruction of the site as part of the new World Trade Center, following a master plan by Studio Daniel Libeskind. Developer Larry Silverstein holds the lease to retail and office space in four of the site's buildings.

== Before the World Trade Center ==
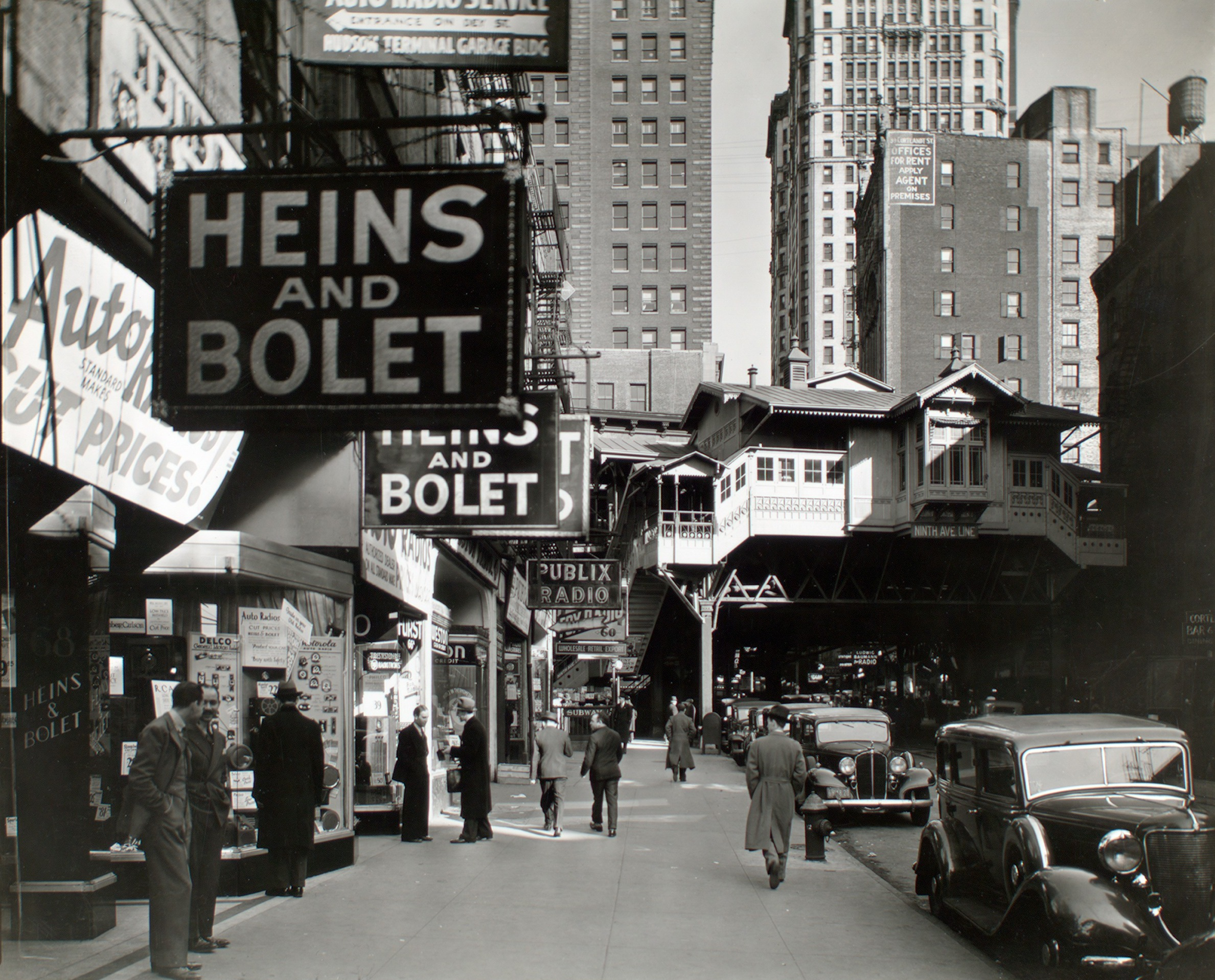
Berenice Abbott's photograph showing Radio Row in 1936, with Cortlandt Street station seen in the background

The western portion of the World Trade Center site was originally under the Hudson River, with the shoreline in the vicinity of Greenwich Street. On this shoreline close to the intersection of Greenwich Street and the former Dey Street, Dutch explorer Adriaen Block's ship, the Tyger, burned to the waterline in November 1613, stranding Block and his crew and forcing them to overwinter on the island. The remains of the ship were buried under landfill when the shoreline was extended starting in 1797, and were discovered during excavation work in 1916. The remains of another ship from the eighteenth century were found in 2010 during excavation work at the site. The ship, believed to be a Hudson River sloop, was found just south of where the Twin Towers used to stand, about 20 feet (6.1 m) below the surface.

The area that was cleared for construction of the original World Trade Center complex was previously occupied by various electronics stores in what was called Radio Row. These streets and stores were demolished in the 1960s to make way for the World Trade Center.

== Original buildings ==
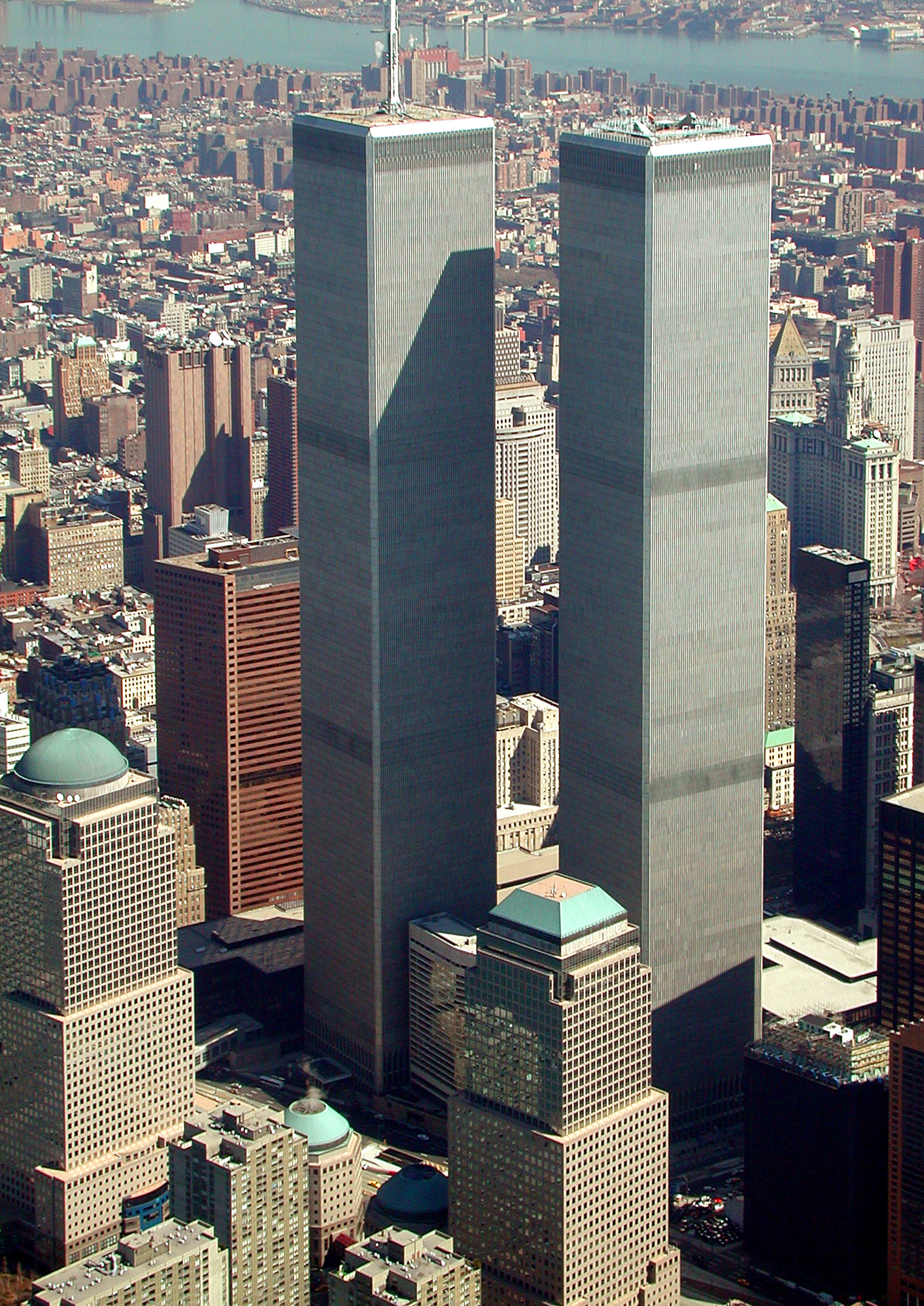
The original World Trade Center complex

At the time of their completion the "Twin Towers"—the original 1 World Trade Center (the North Tower), at 1,368 ft (417 m), and 2 World Trade Center (the South Tower)—were the tallest buildings in the world. The other buildings in the complex included the Marriott World Trade Center (3 WTC), 4 WTC, 5 WTC, 6 WTC, and 7 WTC. All of these buildings were built between 1972 and 1987, with a construction cost of $400 million (equivalent to $3,200,000,000 in 2025 dollars). The complex was located in New York City's Financial District and contained 13,400,000 square feet (1,240,000 m^{2}) of office space.

The World Trade Center experienced a fire on February 13, 1975, a bombing on February 26, 1993 and a robbery on January 14, 1998. In 1998, the Port Authority decided to privatize the World Trade Center, leasing the buildings to a private company to manage, and awarded the lease to Silverstein Properties on July 24, 2001.

=== September 11 attacks ===
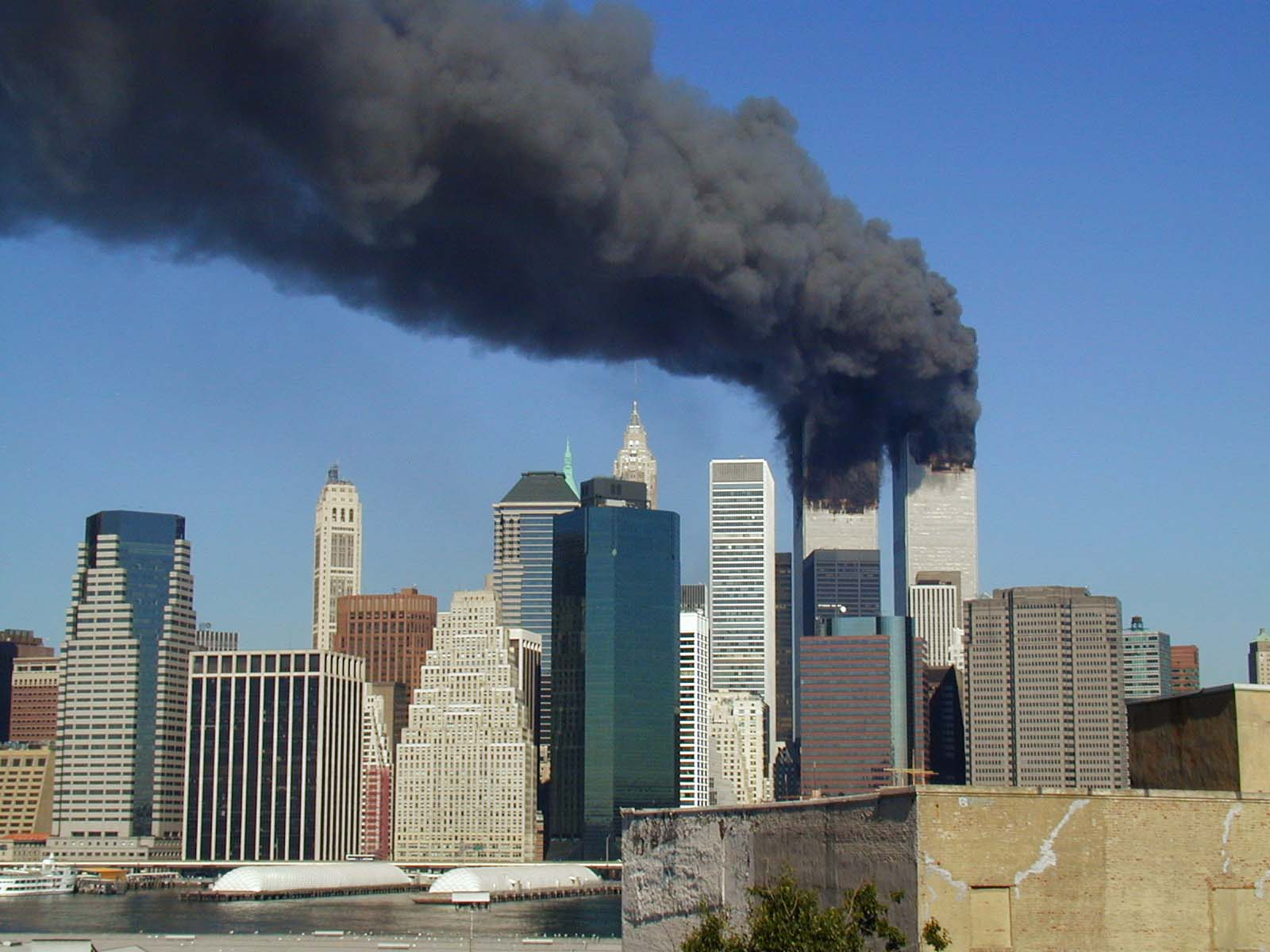
World Trade Center towers following American Airlines Flight 11 and United Airlines Flight 175 both crashing into North and South Towers respectively

On the morning of September 11, 2001, terrorists affiliated with Al-Qaeda hijacked American Airlines Flight 11 and United Airlines Flight 175, both of which were en route from Boston to Los Angeles, and intentionally crashed them into the two main towers of the World Trade Center. The towers collapsed less than two hours later. 2,606 people, including 2,192 civilians, 343 firefighters, and 71 law enforcement officers who were in the towers and in the surrounding area died in the attacks, as well as 147 civilians and the 10 hijackers aboard the two airliners.

After the collapse of the World Trade Center, hospital workers and law enforcement officers began referring to the World Trade Center site as "Ground Zero". Rescue workers also used the term "the pile", referring to the pile of rubble that was left after the buildings collapsed.

Even after the site was cleaned up reconstruction well underway, the term was still frequently used to refer to the site, as when opponents of the Park51 project that was to be located two blocks away from the site labeled it the "Ground Zero mosque".

In advance of the 10th anniversary of the attacks, New York City mayor Michael Bloomberg urged that the "ground zero" moniker be retired, saying, "…the time has come to call those 16 acres [6.5 hectares] what they are: The World Trade Center and the National September 11th Memorial and Museum."

=== Debris and clean-up ===
The collapse of the towers spread dust across New York City and left hundreds of thousands of tons of debris at the site. To organize the cleanup and search for survivors and for human remains, the New York City Fire Department divided the disaster site into four sectors, each headed by its own chief. Cleanup workers trucked most of the building materials and debris from Ground Zero to Fresh Kills Landfill in Staten Island. Some people, such as those affiliated with World Trade Center Families for Proper Burial, were worried that human remains might also have been inadvertently transported to the landfill.

Thousands of immigrant laborers, including many undocumented workers, were employed by contractors and subcontractors to help remove debris, clean surrounding buildings, and sort materials from the site. According to journalist Karla Cornejo Villavicencio, these workers often performed hazardous tasks without adequate protective equipment or health insurance. Many developed serious health problems related to dust and chemical exposure. Despite their contributions to the cleanup effort, undocumented workers have rarely been officially acknowledged or included in public commemorations of the recovery. According to NIST, when WTC 1 (the North Tower) collapsed, falling debris struck 7 World Trade Center and ignited fires on multiple floors. The uncontrolled fires ultimately led to the progressive collapse of the structure.

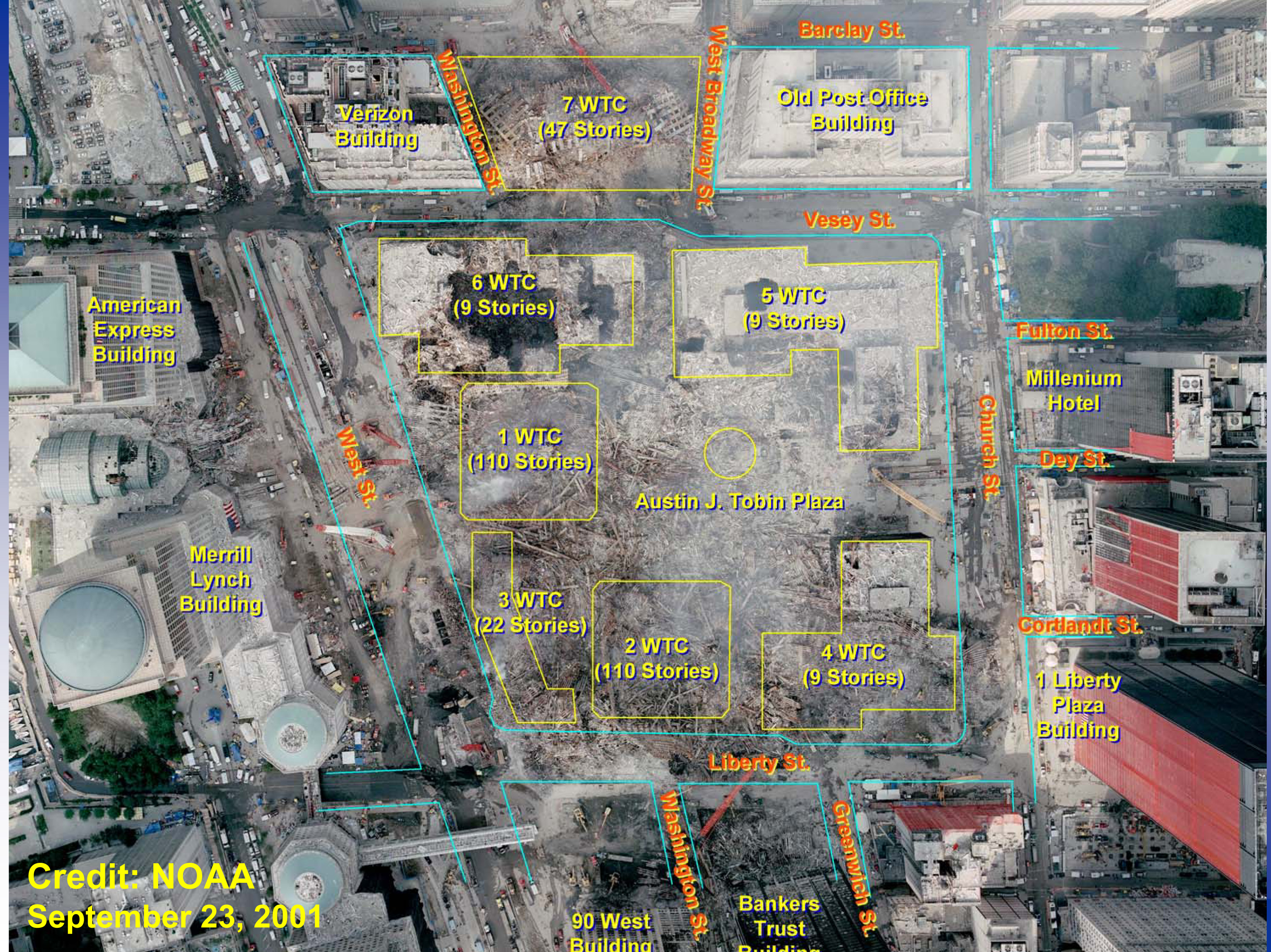
Aerial image of the World Trade center site after the attacks with the location of the Twin Towers and other buildings in the complex superimposed over the debris field

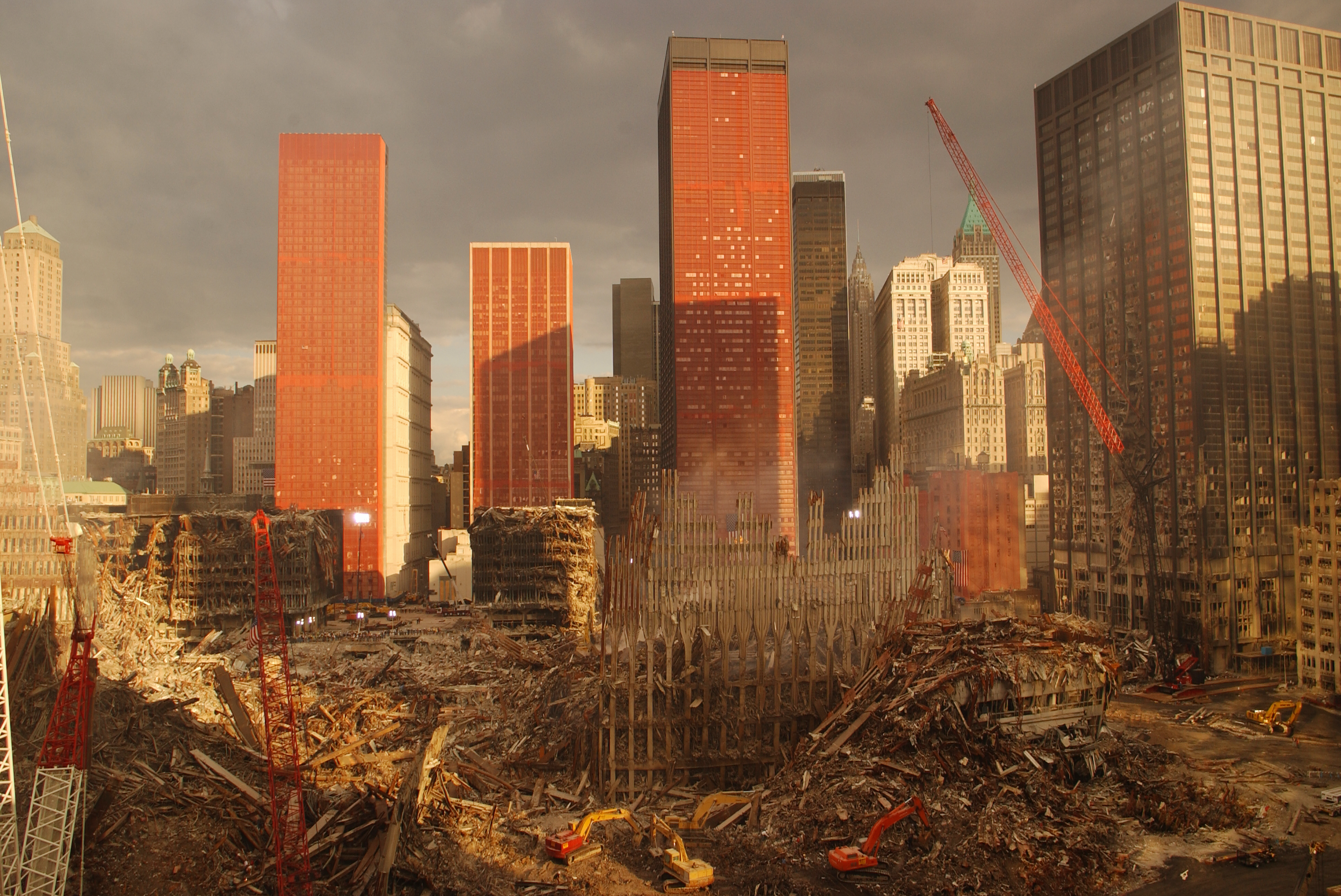
The World Trade Center site 17 days after the September 11, 2001 terrorist attacks. Buildings surrounding the site of the collapsed towers are fitted with mesh to prevent further damage and large construction vehicles are being used to clear debris.

Shortly after the attacks, the surrounding buildings were fitted with red mesh to prevent further damage. In November 2001, the remaining portions of Building 4 were leveled. The absence of the Twin Towers also became a prominent feature of contemporary descriptions of the site and the Lower Manhattan skyline. In the immediate aftermath of the attacks, Time described New York as feeling as though something were missing, comparing the sensation to having a tooth pulled and repeatedly feeling the resulting space with one's tongue. The resulting gap in the Lower Manhattan skyline was subsequently likened to a "missing tooth", reflecting the conspicuous absence of the towers that had previously dominated it.

In December 2001, a temporary viewing platform at Fulton Street, between Church Street and Broadway, was opened to the public. That month, the last standing perimeter columns from the North Tower and the last remaining portions of Building 6 were removed. Early estimates suggested that debris removal would take a year, but cleanup ended in May 2002, under budget and without a single serious injury. The Winter Garden Atrium was reopened to the public on September 17, 2002, the first major structure to be completely restored following the attacks.

Starting March 11, 2002, eighty-eight searchlights were installed and arranged to form two beams of light shooting straight up into the sky. This was called the Tribute in Light, and was originally lit every day at dusk until April 14, 2002. After that, the lights were lit on the second anniversary of the attack and have been lit on each subsequent September 11 since then. In February 2005, the New York City Medical Examiner's office ended its process of identifying human remains at the site.

In August 2008, New York City firefighters donated a cross made of steel from the World Trade Center to the Shanksville Volunteer Fire Company. The beam, mounted atop a platform shaped like the Pentagon, was erected outside the Shanksville firehouse near the crash site of United Airlines Flight 93.

Portions of the South Tower had also damaged the nearby Deutsche Bank Building, which soon became filled with toxic dust. By 2002, Deutsche Bank determined that its building was unsalvageable and it was scheduled for demolition. In January 2011, the demolition of the Deutsche Bank Building was completed.

=== Archaeology ===
In July 2010, a team of archaeologists at the site discovered the remains of a 32-foot (9.8 m)-long boat over 200 years old; it was probably made in the 18th century and dumped there along with wooden beams and trash in about 1810 to make up the land. The boat had been weighted to make it sink as part of foundations for a new pier. Samples of its wood have been taken for dendrochronology.

=== Ownership status ===
While the PANYNJ is often identified as the owner of the WTC site, the ownership situation was complicated after the September 11 attacks. The Port Authority did own a "significant" internal portion of the site of 16 acres (6.5 ha) but has acknowledged "ambiguities over ownership of miscellaneous strips of property at the World Trade Center site" going back to the 1960s. It was unclear who owned 2.5 acres (1.0 ha) of the site comprising land where streets had been before the World Trade Center was built. In subsequent deals, the Port Authority gave some land to Larry Silverstein, including the land under 2 and 3 WTC in 2008.

== Planning for the new World Trade Center ==
U.S. President George W. Bush making remarks from "Ground Zero" on September 14, 2001

Soon after the September 11 attacks, Mayor Rudy Giuliani, Governor George Pataki, and President George W. Bush vowed to rebuild the World Trade Center site. On the day of the attacks, Giuliani proclaimed, "We will rebuild. We're going to come out of this stronger than before, politically stronger, economically stronger. The skyline will be made whole again."

In a later address before Congress, the president declared, "As a symbol of America's resolve, my administration will work with Congress, and these two leaders, to show the world that we will rebuild New York City." The immediate response from World Trade Center leaseholder Larry Silverstein was that "it would be the tragedy of tragedies not to rebuild this part of New York. It would give the terrorists the victory they seek." However, by 2011, only one building, 7 World Trade Center, had been rebuilt. The buildings that have been rebuilt as of June 2018 include 7 World Trade Center, One World Trade Center, 4 World Trade Center, and 3 World Trade Center. The original twin towers took less than three years from start of construction to be finished and five years from the beginning planning stages. However, given the complexity and highly political nature of the rebuilding efforts, they are often cited as an example of a successful public-private collaboration and are taught as a case study in successful negotiations.

=== Early proposals for redesign ===
==== Lower Manhattan Development Corporation ====
Governor Pataki established the Lower Manhattan Development Corporation (LMDC) in November 2001, as an official commission to oversee the rebuilding process. The LMDC coordinates federal assistance in the rebuilding process, and works with the PANYNJ, Larry Silverstein, and Studio Daniel Libeskind, the master plan architect for the site's redesign. The corporation also handles communication with the local community, businesses, the city of New York, and relatives of victims of the September 11 attacks. A 16-member board of directors, half appointed by the governor and half by the mayor of New York, governs the LMDC.

The LMDC had questionable legal status regarding the restoration of the World Trade Center site, because the Port Authority owns most of the property and Larry Silverstein leased the World Trade Center's office space in July 2001. But the LMDC, in an April 2002 articulation of its principles for action, asserted its role in revitalizing lower Manhattan.

==== Directly after the attacks ====
In the months following the attacks, architects and urban planning experts held meetings and forums to discuss ideas for rebuilding the site. In January 2002, New York City art dealer Max Protetch solicited 50 concepts and renderings from artists and architects, which were put on exhibit in his Chelsea art gallery.

In April 2002, the LMDC sent out requests for proposals to redesign the World Trade Center site to 24 Manhattan architecture firms, but then soon withdrew them. The following month, the LMDC selected Beyer Blinder Belle as planner for the redesign of the World Trade Center site.

On July 16, 2002, Beyer Blinder Belle unveiled six concepts for redesigning the World Trade Center site. All six designs were voted "poor" by the roughly 5,000 New Yorkers that submitted feedback, so the LDMC announced a new, international, open-design study.

==== 2002 World Trade Center site design competition ====
World Trade Center site layout

Above: The World Trade Center site prior to the September 11 attacks.

Above: Preliminary site plans for the World Trade Center rebuild.

Comparison (background: pre-9/11, blue overlay: planned rebuild)

In an August 2002 press release, the LMDC announced a design study for the World Trade Center site. The following month, the LMDC, along with New York New Visions – a coalition of 21 architecture, engineering, planning, landscape architecture and design organizations – announced seven semifinalists. The following seven architecture firms were then invited to compete to be the master plan architect for the World Trade Center:

- Foster and Partners (Norman Foster)
- Studio Daniel Libeskind (Daniel Libeskind)
- Meier Eisenman Gwathmey Holl (Peter Eisenman, Richard Meier, Charles Gwathmey and Steven Holl), known as "The New York Five"
- Skidmore, Owings & Merrill
- THINK Team (Shigeru Ban, Frederic Schwartz, Ken Smith, Rafael Viñoly)
- United Architects

Peterson Littenberg, a small New York architecture firm, had been enlisted by the LMDC earlier that summer as a consultant, and was invited to participate as the seventh semifinalist.

The seven semifinalists presented their entries to the public on December 18, 2002, at the Winter Garden of the World Financial Center. In the following weeks, Skidmore, Owings & Merrill withdrew its entry from the competition.

Days before the announcement of the two finalists in February 2003, Larry Silverstein wrote to LMDC Chair John Whitehead to express his disapproval of all of the semifinalists' designs. As the Twin Towers' insurance money recipient, Silverstein claimed that he had the sole right to decide what would be built. He announced that he had already picked Skidmore, Owings & Merrill as his master planner for the site.

On February 1, 2003, the LMDC selected two finalists, the THINK Team and Studio Daniel Libeskind, and planned on picking a single winner by the end of the month. Rafael Viñoly of the THINK Team and Studio Daniel Libeskind presented their designs to the LMDC, which selected the THINK design. Earlier the same day, however, Roland Betts, a member of the LMDC, had called a meeting and the corporation had agreed to vote for the THINK design before hearing the final presentations. Governor Pataki, who had originally commissioned the LMDC, intervened and overruled the LMDC's decision. On February 27, 2003, Studio Daniel Libeskind officially won the competition to be the master planner for the World Trade Center redesign.

Libeskind's original proposal, which is titled Memory Foundations, underwent extensive revisions during collaboration with Larry Silverstein, and Skidmore, Owings & Merrill, whom Silverstein hired. Though Libeskind designed the site, the individual buildings have been designed by different architects. While not all of Liebeskind's ideas were incorporated into the final design, his design and the public support it garnered did solidify the principle that the original footprints of the Twin Towers should be turned into a memorial and not be used for commercial purposes. As a result, Liebeskind's lawyers at the New York firm of Wachtell Lipton embarked on the multi-year negotiation process to frame a master plan for the rebuilding. The first step in this process, completed in 2003, was the "swap" in which Silverstein gave up his rights to the footprints of the Twin Towers so that they could become a memorial, and in exchange received the right to build five new office towers around the memorial. The "swap" and the ensuing negotiations, which lasted for many years, have been referred to as the most complex real estate transaction in human history because of the complexity of the issues involved, the many stakeholders, and the difficulty of reaching consensus.

=== Criticism of progress ===
An episode of CBS's 60 Minutes in 2010 focused on the lack of progress at Ground Zero, particularly on the lack of completion dates for a majority of the buildings. The episode also featured how the main tower, One World Trade Center, had undergone three different designs, and the delays and monetary expense involved. Investor Larry Silverstein said the Port Authority's estimated completion date for the entire site was 2037, and billions of dollars had already been spent on the project, even though Ground Zero was "still a hole in the ground". During an interview for the episode, Larry Silverstein mentioned he was "the most frustrated person in the world" and said "I'm seventy-eight years of age; I want to see this thing done in my lifetime". However, it was noted that in early 2011, all five office towers of the World Trade Center had begun construction.

The social center of the former World Trade Center included a notable restaurant on the 107th Floor, called Windows on the World, and its Greatest Bar in the World; these were tourist attractions in their own right, and a social gathering spot for people who worked in the towers. This restaurant also housed one of the most prestigious wine schools in the United States, called "Windows on the World Wine School", run by wine personality Kevin Zraly. Despite numerous assurances that these local landmarks and global attractions would be rebuilt, the Port Authority scrapped plans to rebuild these WTC attractions, which has outraged some observers.

== New structures ==
As of May 2026, the current structures on the site include:

Name	Image	Date construction started	Date of completion	Height	Current status
One World Trade Center		April 27, 2006; 20 years ago	November 3, 2014; 12 years ago	1,776 feet (541 m)	Completed
2 World Trade Center		July 9, 2026; 4 months ago	2031; 5 years' time	1,226 feet (374 m)	Under construction
3 World Trade Center		March 8, 2010; 16 years ago	June 11, 2018; 8 years ago	1,079 feet (329 m)	Completed
4 World Trade Center		January 22, 2008; 18 years ago	November 13, 2013; 13 years ago	978 feet (298 m)	Completed
5 World Trade Center		2027; 1 year's time	2030; 4 years' time	902 feet (275 m)	On hold
Ronald O. Perelman Performing Arts Center (6 World Trade Center)		August 31, 2017; 9 years ago	September 13, 2023; 3 years ago	138 feet (42 m)	Completed
7 World Trade Center		May 7, 2002; 24 years ago	May 23, 2006; 20 years ago	745 feet (227 m)	Completed
National September 11 Memorial		March 13, 2006; 20 years ago	September 11, 2011; 15 years ago		Completed
National September 11 Museum		March 13, 2006; 20 years ago	May 21, 2014; 12 years ago		Completed
World Trade Center Transportation Hub		April 26, 2010; 16 years ago	March 3, 2016; 10 years ago		Completed
Vehicular Security Center		November 10, 2011; 15 years ago	2017; 9 years ago		Completed
Liberty Park		November 20, 2013; 13 years ago	June 29, 2016; 10 years ago		Completed
St. Nicholas Greek Orthodox Church		October 18, 2014; 12 years ago	December 6, 2022; 3 years ago		Completed
Fiterman Hall		December 2009; 16 years ago	August 27, 2012; 14 years ago		Completed

=== Towers ===
One World Trade Center (previously coined the "Freedom Tower" by Governor Pataki) is the centerpiece of Libeskind's design. The building rises to 1,368 feet (417 m), the height of the original World Trade Center's North Tower, and its antenna rises to the symbolic height of 1,776 feet (541 m). This height refers to 1776, the year in which the United States Declaration of Independence was signed. The tower was a collaboration between Studio Daniel Libeskind and Skidmore, Owings & Merrill architect David Childs. Childs acted as the design architect and project manager for the tower, and Daniel Libeskind collaborated on the concept and schematic design. The design was finalized in 2004, but was revised extensively after the NYPD raised security concerns, which delayed the start of the construction by two years. In 2006, the Port Authority took over from Silverstein Properties. The project's developer Tishman Construction Corporation was the construction manager at the time. Construction began in April 2006. Digging the foundation and installing tower-foundation steel columns, concrete, and rebar took twice as long as it normally would due to the existence of the subway line under West Broadway nearby. The building reached grade level by 2010, progressed at a pace of one floor a week, topped out in August 2012, and was structurally completed in May 2013. The building opened on November 3, 2014, and the first 170 employees of anchor tenant Conde Nast began their work there.

Danish architect Bjarke Ingels designed Two World Trade Center, also known as 200 Greenwich Street. The building's gardens integrate Tribeca with the Financial District at the World Trade Center. As part of a 2010 lease deal to finance 4 WTC, there were plans to build 2 and 3 World Trade Center to ground level. Construction of everything up to street level was completed in mid-2013. The rest of the building, however, has yet to be built until tenants for Tower 2 can be found.

Richard Rogers Partnership designed Three World Trade Center, or 175 Greenwich Street, which stands across Greenwich Street from the Memorial's two reflecting pools. Groundbreaking occurred in fall 2008, and in May 2009, the Port Authority proposed reducing the tower to four stories. In 2012, with Silverstein still unable to find tenants, construction on the above-ground levels was delayed indefinitely, with plans for only 7 stories. However, work progressed on below-grade foundations and the ground-level podium, which was completed by October 2013. Anchor tenant Group M was finally signed in late 2013, but finance negotiations between Silverstein Properties and the Port Authority dragged, until an agreement was reached in June 2014. Construction resumed in August 2014, and the building opened on June 11, 2018.

Maki and Associates designed Four World Trade Center, also known as 150 Greenwich Street. Construction started in 2008, and the steel skeleton was mostly complete by 2012. The building opened in November 2013, making it the second tower on the site to open behind 7 World Trade Center, as well as the first building on the Port Authority property. The first tenants to move in were two government agencies, and as of July 2015, the building is 62% leased.

Five World Trade Center was designed by Kohn Pedersen Fox and will stand where the Deutsche Bank Building once stood. On June 22, 2007, the Port Authority announced that JP Morgan Chase will lease the 42-story building for its investment banking headquarters; however, JPMorgan's March 2008 acquisition of Bear Stearns had caused construction to stagnate, as the company changed its plans and relocated its headquarters to 383 Madison Avenue. Construction began on September 9, 2011. Although the foundation was completed, construction on the main structure never commenced.

7 World Trade Center stands off of Port Authority property. David Childs of Skidmore, Owings & Merrill designed the tower. Construction of the new 7 World Trade Center began in 2002 and the building opened on May 23, 2006, achieving LEED gold status and being the first tower in the complex to reopen. The building is 52 stories tall (plus one underground floor), making it the 28th-tallest in New York.

=== Memorial and museum ===
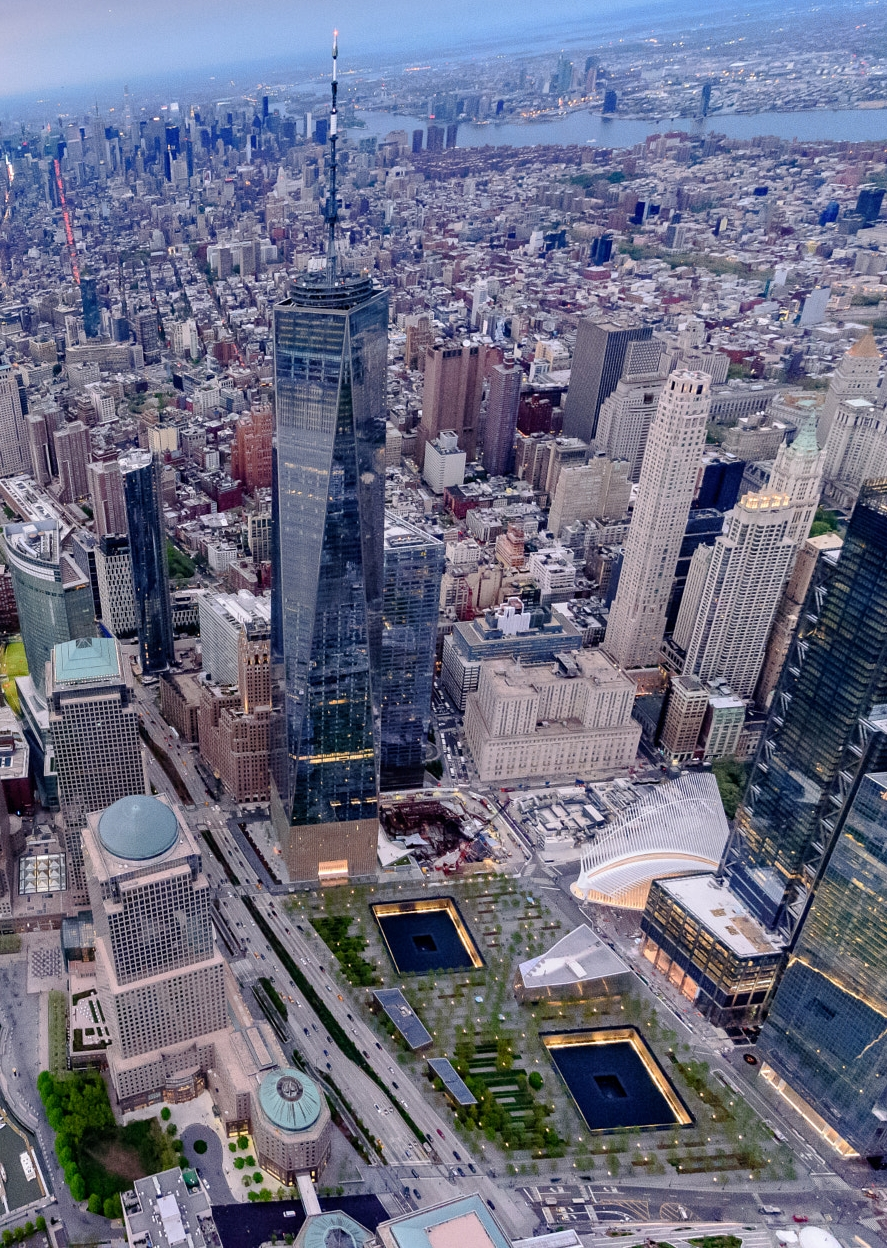
The National September 11 Memorial & Museum in the new World Trade Center complex

A memorial called Reflecting Absence honors the victims of the September 11 attacks and the 1993 World Trade Center bombing. The memorial, designed by Peter Walker and Israeli-American architect Michael Arad, consists of a field of trees interrupted by the footprints of the twin towers. Pools of water fill the footprints, underneath which sits a memorial space whose walls bear the names of the victims. The slurry wall, which holds back the Hudson River in the west and was an integral part of Libeskind's proposal, remains exposed. Walker and Arad were selected from more than 5,000 entrants in the World Trade Center Site Memorial Competition in January 2004.

On October 12, 2004, the LMDC announced that Gehry Partners LLP and Snøhetta, an architectural firm from Norway, would design the site's performing arts and museum complexes, respectively, in the same area as the memorial. The Snøhetta-designed museum will act as a memorial museum and visitors' center, after family members of 9/11 victims objected to the building's original occupant, the International Freedom Center. The Ground Zero Museum Workshop is a privately run 501(c) nonprofit museum that is not connected to the official Ground Zero Memorial or Gehry's museum.

Construction of the memorial was completed by early 2011. The memorial opened on September 11, 2011, coinciding with the 10th anniversary of the attacks. The museum was initially scheduled to open on September 11, 2012, one year after the opening of the memorial. However, construction was halted in December 2011 due to financial disputes between the Port Authority of New York and New Jersey and the National September 11 Memorial and Museum Foundation, deciding on who should be responsible for infrastructure costs. Those disputes were resolved and construction resumed on September 10, 2012. Further delays were caused when Hurricane Sandy significantly damaged the site in November 2012. The museum was completed and opened to families of the victims on May 15, 2014 and opened to the general public on May 21, 2014.

=== Retail space ===
In early December 2013, Australian retail corporation Westfield announced that it will invest US$800 million for complete control of the retail space at the rebuilt center. Westfield purchased the Port Authority of New York and New Jersey's 50 percent stake in the retail part of the World Trade Center site, increasing its total investment to more than US$1.4 billion.

Westfield World Trade Center opened with its first group of stores on August 16, 2016. It has roughly 365,000 square feet (33,900 m^{2}) of retail space, which once again makes it the largest shopping mall in Manhattan. Although the new mall is only spread over roughly one-half of the original mall's footprint (due to the new space required for the below-grade National September 11 Memorial & Museum), the mall is double-level, whereas the original mall was a single level. Three additional levels will exist above grade on the lower floors of 2 and 3 World Trade Center, while 4 World Trade Center currently houses four above-grade levels. The World Trade Center station's headhouse, the Oculus, also houses a large amount of retail space.

=== Transportation Hub ===
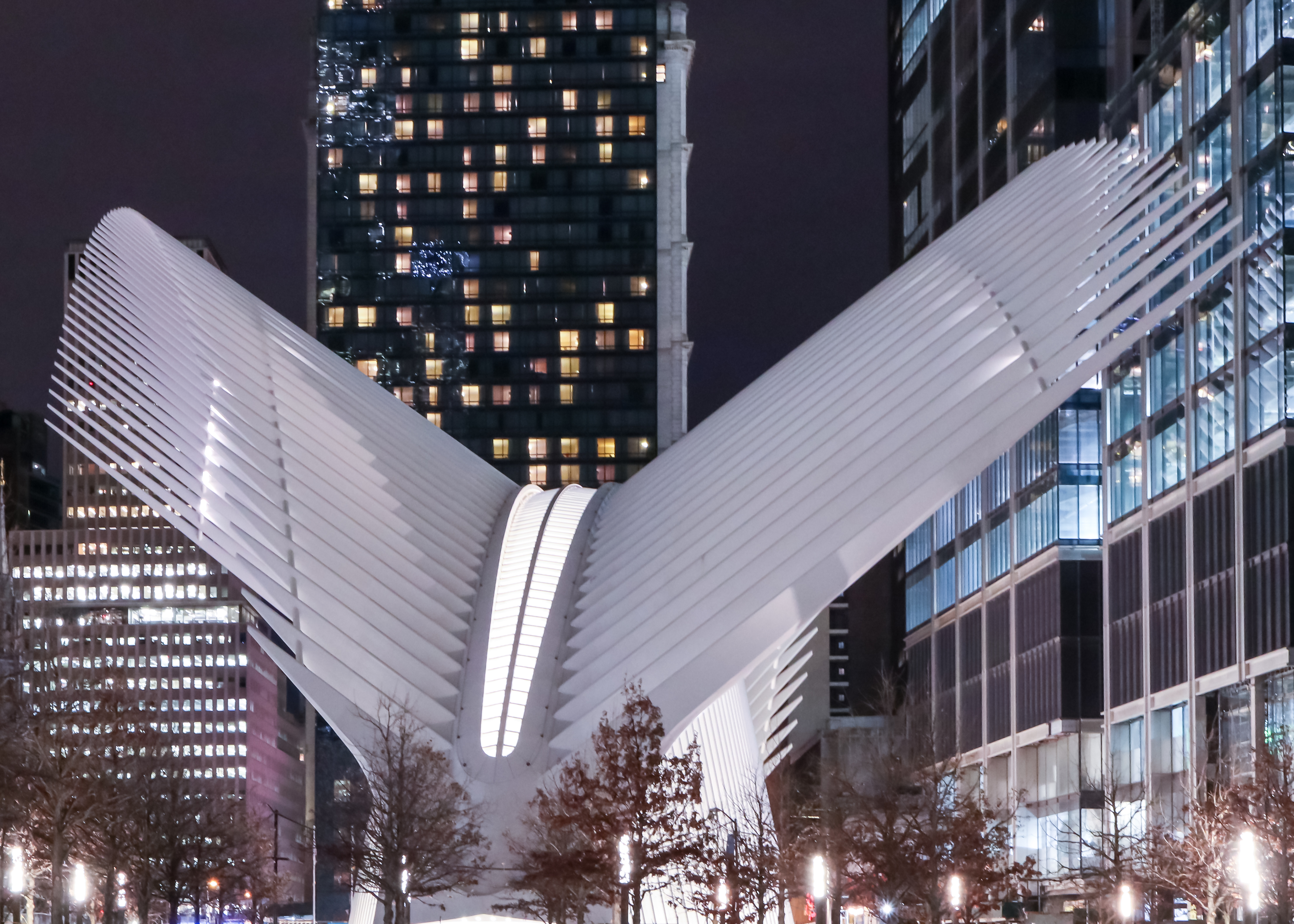
The Oculus building of the World Trade Center station (PATH)

Santiago Calatrava designed the World Trade Center Transportation Hub (its main asset being the PATH station) to replace the old World Trade Center station. The Transport Hub connects the PATH station to the WTC Cortlandt station (1 train), the Battery Park City Ferry Terminal, the Brookfield Place, and One World Trade Center on the west; and the 2, 3, 4, 5, A, C, E, J, N, R, W, and Z trains through the Fulton Center on the east. The new station, as well as the September 11 Memorial and Museum, is air-cooled via a heat exchanger fed by four pipes carrying water from the Hudson River. The cost for the transportation hub is estimated at $3.44 billion, a statistic that has seen much controversy given its greatly inflated cost.

A temporary PATH station opened in 2003 and construction on the permanent station was supposed to begin in fall 2004; however, the NYPD raised security concerns on the entire site. Among the revisions effecting the Transportation Hub was doubling the number of support columns. In the original plan, the construction of the 9/11 Memorial and Museum was only supposed to have begun after the Transportation Hub had been completed because the roof of the Transportation Hub provided the foundation on which the Memorial rested upon and the walls of the Museum. Due to the two-year delay and pressure by the victims' families to have the Memorial completed by the 10th anniversary, it was decided to concentrate on building the Memorial and holding off construction of the Transportation Hub, which increased costs. Construction finally began on the Transportation Hub in 2010. The hub formally opened on March 3, 2016, several years behind schedule and billions of dollars over budget.

=== Perelman Performing Arts Center ===
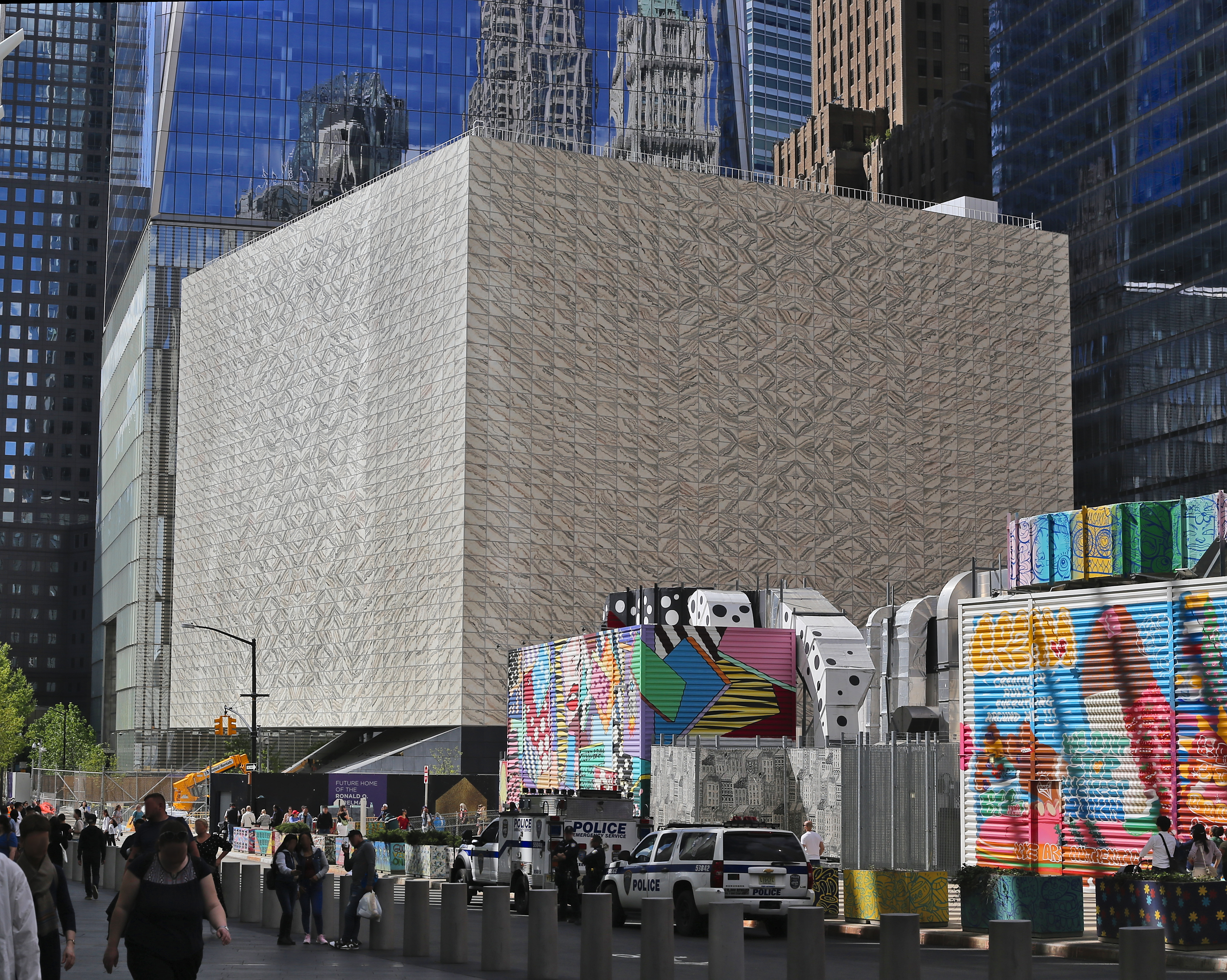
Construction on the Ronald O. Perelman Performing Arts Center in May 2023

The Ronald O. Perelman Performing Arts Center (also known as 6 World Trade Center) was announced originally as The World Trade Center's Performing Arts Center in 2004, with the building to be designed by Gehry Partners LLP and Snøhetta. Construction was to begin in December 2014 when the removal of the temporary PATH station commenced. However, the original plans were shelved in September 2014. After a design was chosen in 2015, it was announced that Joshua Prince-Ramus was awarded the contract to design the building. In June 2016, the center was renamed after billionaire businessman Ronald Perelman, who donated $75 million to the center, and on September 8, 2016, a design was revealed for the new center. The underground parking garage started construction in 2017, followed by the building in 2018. The center opened on September 13, 2023.

The Performing Arts Center includes 129,000 square feet (12,000 m^{2}) across three floors. The public floor is located at street level and houses a restaurant/bar to provide refreshments during show intermissions. The second floor consists of rehearsal and dressing rooms for theater actors, and the third floor has three theaters with between 99 and 450 seats. All three theaters are designed so that the walls will be able to rotate and expand to provide extra space for a single theater if needed. The theaters can fit approximately 1,200 people combined.

=== Liberty Park and constituent structures ===
Liberty Park, a new elevated park, was built on top of a parking complex named the Vehicular Security Center at the southwest corner of the site. Construction began in 2013 when the Vehicular Security Center was completed. About $50 million was allocated to the park's construction by the Port Authority of New York and New Jersey in December 2013. The park opened on June 29, 2016. On August 16, 2017, the Port Authority installed the iconic sculpture The Sphere within the park, overlooking its original location in the old World Trade Center.

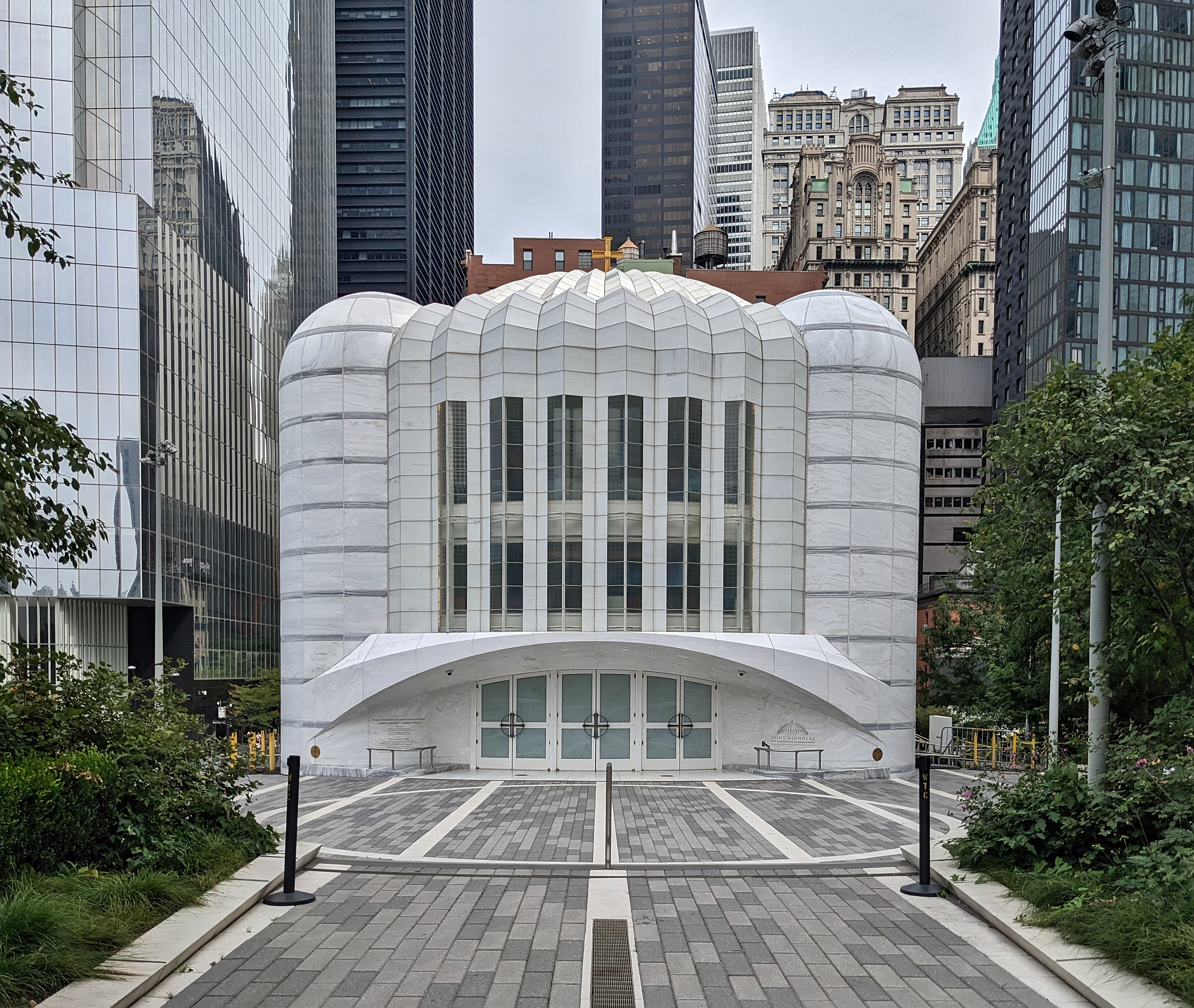
The St. Nicholas Greek Orthodox Church

The St. Nicholas Greek Orthodox Church was originally supposed to be relocated, but the most recent plans call for the church to be built in Liberty Park. On July 23, 2008, the Port Authority of New York and New Jersey reached a deal with the leaders of the church for the Port Authority to acquire the 1,200-square-foot (110 m^{2}) lot that the church occupied for $20 million, and relocate the church. Officials reneged in 2009, leading the Greek Orthodox Diocese of America to sue the Port Authority for failing to rebuild the church. On October 14, 2011, an agreement for the reconstruction of the church was signed that ended all legal action. The ground blessing ceremony and symbolic laying of the cornerstone took place in October 2014, with construction expected to be completed within two years. However, in December 2017, construction was halted due to unpaid expenses. Work restarted in August 2020. The church fully opened for regular services on December 6, 2022, the Feast of Saint Nicholas.

The 1-acre (0.4 ha) park, measuring 300 feet (91 m) long and located at a height of 20 feet (6.1 m), has a capacity of 750 people. A green wall is located on the Liberty Street facade. A walkway from the pedestrian bridge curves along the park; egresses include three stairways, the pedestrian bridge, and a straight ramp down to Greenwich Street. Of these exits, a wide staircase is located parallel to Greenwich Street and directly behind the church. There are wood benches and a small amphitheater-like elevated space at the West Street end of the park. Finally, there is an observation balcony along much of Liberty Street and another slightly curved balcony at the church's foot.

=== Fiterman Hall ===
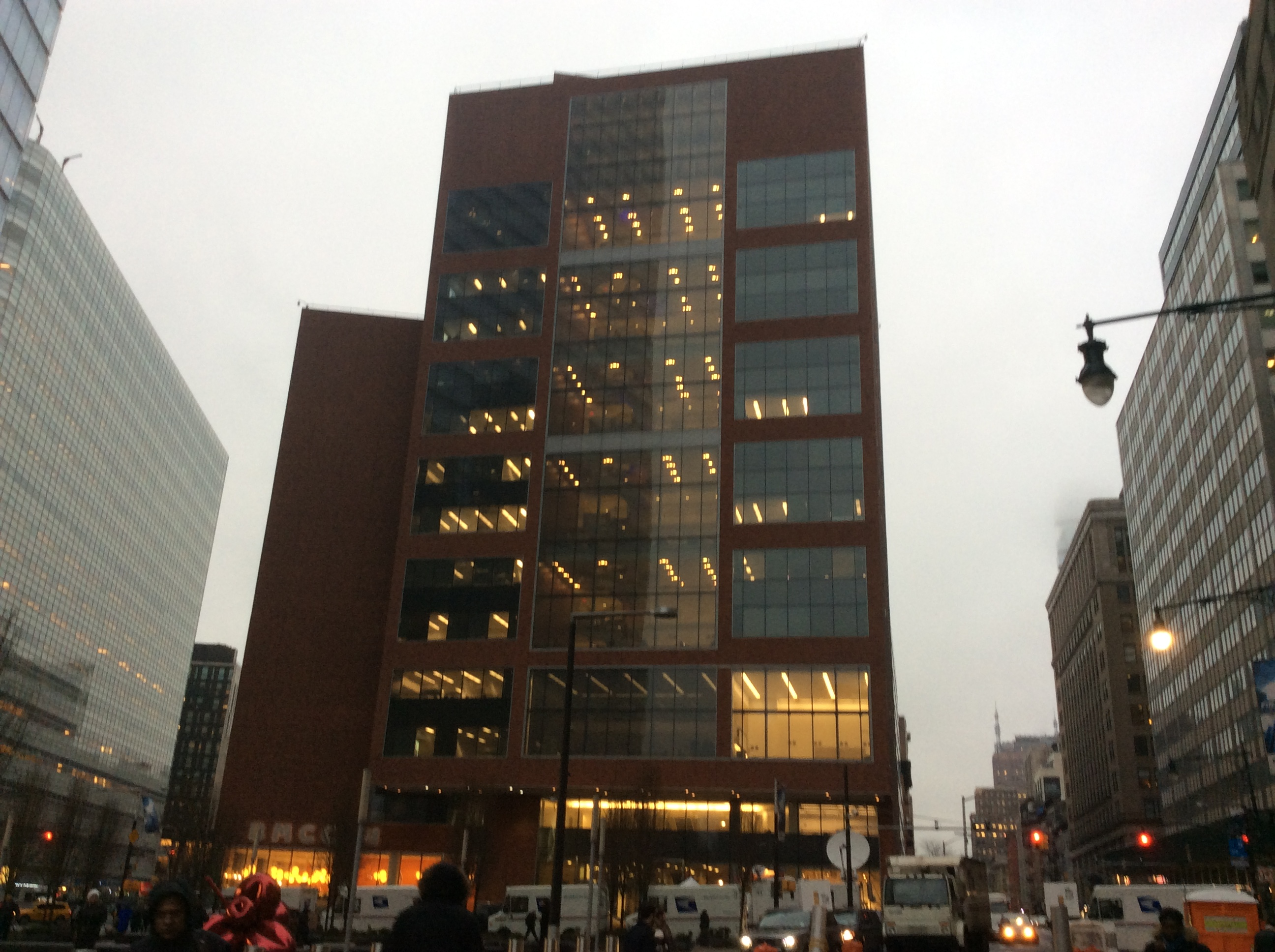
The new Fiterman Hall

The original Fiterman Hall opened as an office building in 1959 and occupied a block bounded by Greenwich Street, Barclay Street, West Broadway, and Park Place. It was donated to BMCC in 1993 by Miles and Shirley Fiterman, for whom the building was subsequently named. In 2000, the State of New York Dormitory Authority, which owned the building, began a massive renovation to better adapt the building for classroom use. During the September 11 attacks in 2001, Fiterman Hall's structure was severely damaged by debris from the collapse of 7 World Trade Center. The renovation was never completed, and the building was condemned and demolished in 2008. After a series of delays, a new building designed by the architectural firm Pei Cobb Freed & Partners broke ground in December 2009 and was completed in 2012.

== Exclusive ZIP Code ==
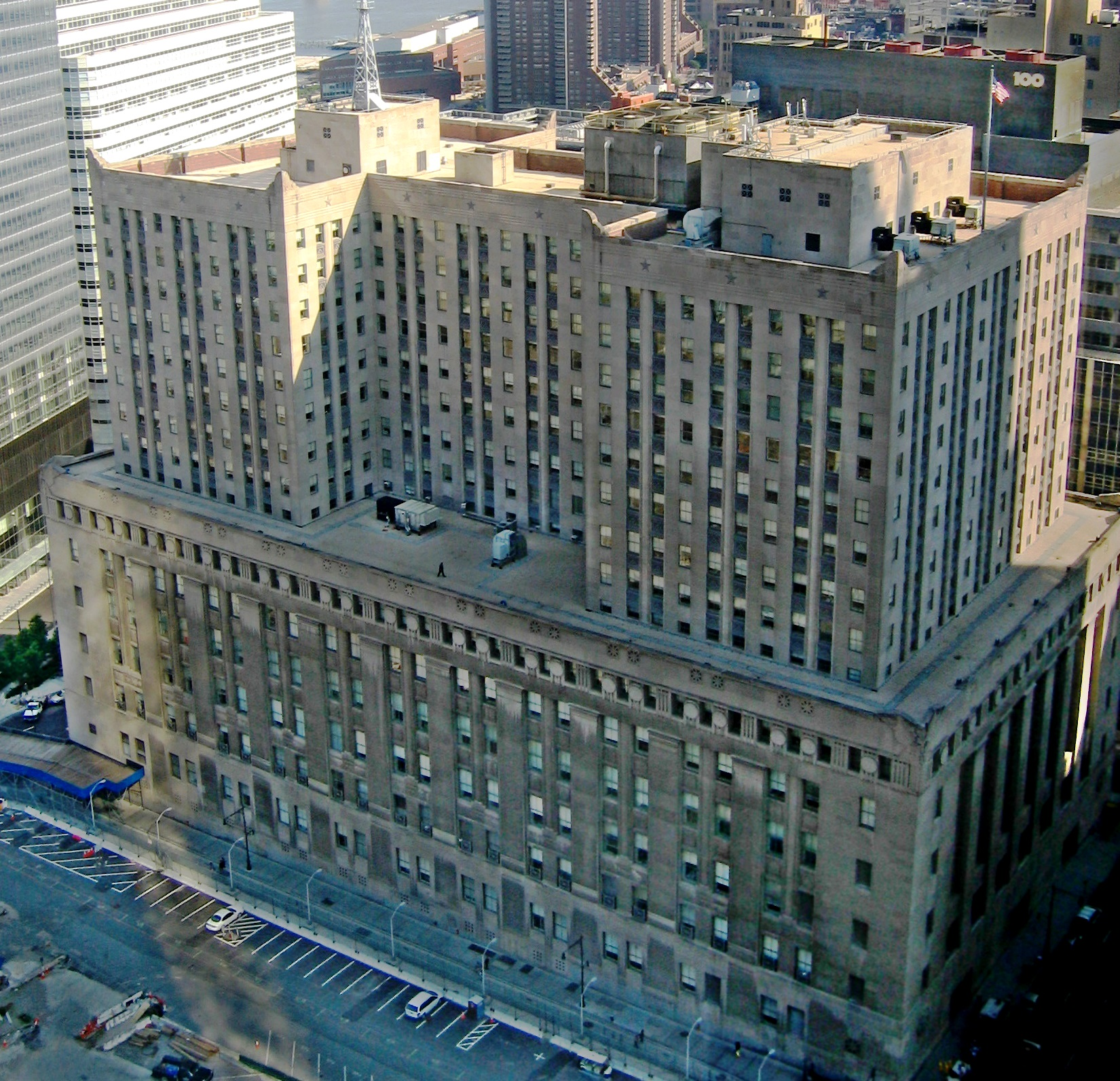
US Post Office – Church Street Station

The World Trade Center site used the ZIP Code 10048 before the September 11 attacks, and there were eight letter carriers assigned to the buildings to deliver mail to the buildings' tenants. All of the Postal Service employees survived the attacks. In the months following the attacks, over 80,000 pieces of mail continued to arrive each day addressed to the World Trade Center, including some items loosely addressed to such recipients as "The Search Dogs" or "The Rescuers". By 2003, 3,600 items of mail per day were still being sent to 10048. These items were processed at the James A. Farley General Post Office, the main facility for New York City, located across from Penn Station in Midtown Manhattan. Mail there was held for pick-up by messenger, forwarded to the intended recipient, returned to its sender, or destroyed.

Following the attacks, the United States Postal Service provided free mail-forwarding service to the WTC's former occupants for three years, rather than the usual one-year period. By the end of 2006, the number of items sent to 10048 had decreased to around 300 items daily, mostly sent from businesses and organizations that had not yet updated their bulk mailing lists.

The 90 Church Street Station Post Office building is located adjacent to the new World Trade Center and the PATH station, and serves the ZIP Code of 10007, which is assigned to the surrounding Tribeca neighborhood. The new World Trade Center does not use the ZIP Code 10048; rather, it has been integrated within the existing 10007 ZIP Code. After the attacks, the 10048 ZIP Code was reused for a pictorial cancellation commemorating the anniversary of the attacks.

== See also ==
- Collapse of the World Trade Center
- Construction of One World Trade Center
- Health effects arising from the September 11 attacks
- Survivors' Staircase
- Verizon Building
