= 5 World Trade Center =

Proposed skyscraper in Manhattan, New York

- 130 Liberty Street
- Rendering of proposed design (February 2021)

General information
- Status: On hold
- Type: Mixed-use: (Office building; Residential)
- Location: 130 Liberty Street; Manhattan, New York City 10007, United States, New York, U.S.
- Coordinates: 40°42′37″N 74°00′46″W

Height
- Height: 910 feet (280 m)
- Architectural: 910 feet (280 m)
- Roof: 910 feet (280 m)
- Top floor: 80

Technical details
- Floor count: 80
- Floor area: 1,560,000 square feet (145,000 m^{2})

Design and construction
- Architect: Kohn Pedersen Fox
- Developer: Silverstein Properties; BGRE

Website
- www.explorewtc.com/en/local/learn-about-wtc/5-world-trade-center.html

5 World Trade Center (5 WTC; also referred to as 130 Liberty Street) is a planned skyscraper at the World Trade Center in Lower Manhattan, New York City. The site is across Liberty Street, to the south of the main 16-acre (6.5 ha) World Trade Center site. In February 2021, it was announced the new 5 World Trade Center will be developed in a joint venture between Silverstein Properties and BGRE, formerly Brookfield Properties. The proposed building shares its name with the original 5 World Trade Center, which was heavily damaged as a result of the collapse of the North Tower during the September 11 attacks and was later demolished.

In June 2007, JPMorgan Chase announced plans to develop the building as the headquarters of its investment division, J.P. Morgan & Co. However, after JPMorgan Chase's acquisition of Bear Stearns in March 2008, the company relocated J.P. Morgan to 383 Madison Avenue. In June 2019, the Port Authority and Lower Manhattan Development Corporation agreed to a joint request for proposal (RFP) for the site.

As of February 2021, a new design has been announced for the new 5 World Trade Center to be developed by Silverstein Properties and Brookfield Properties. The new design calls for a 1,560,000-square-foot (145,000 m^{2}), 910-foot-tall (280 m) mixed-use tower.

== Original building (1970–2001) ==
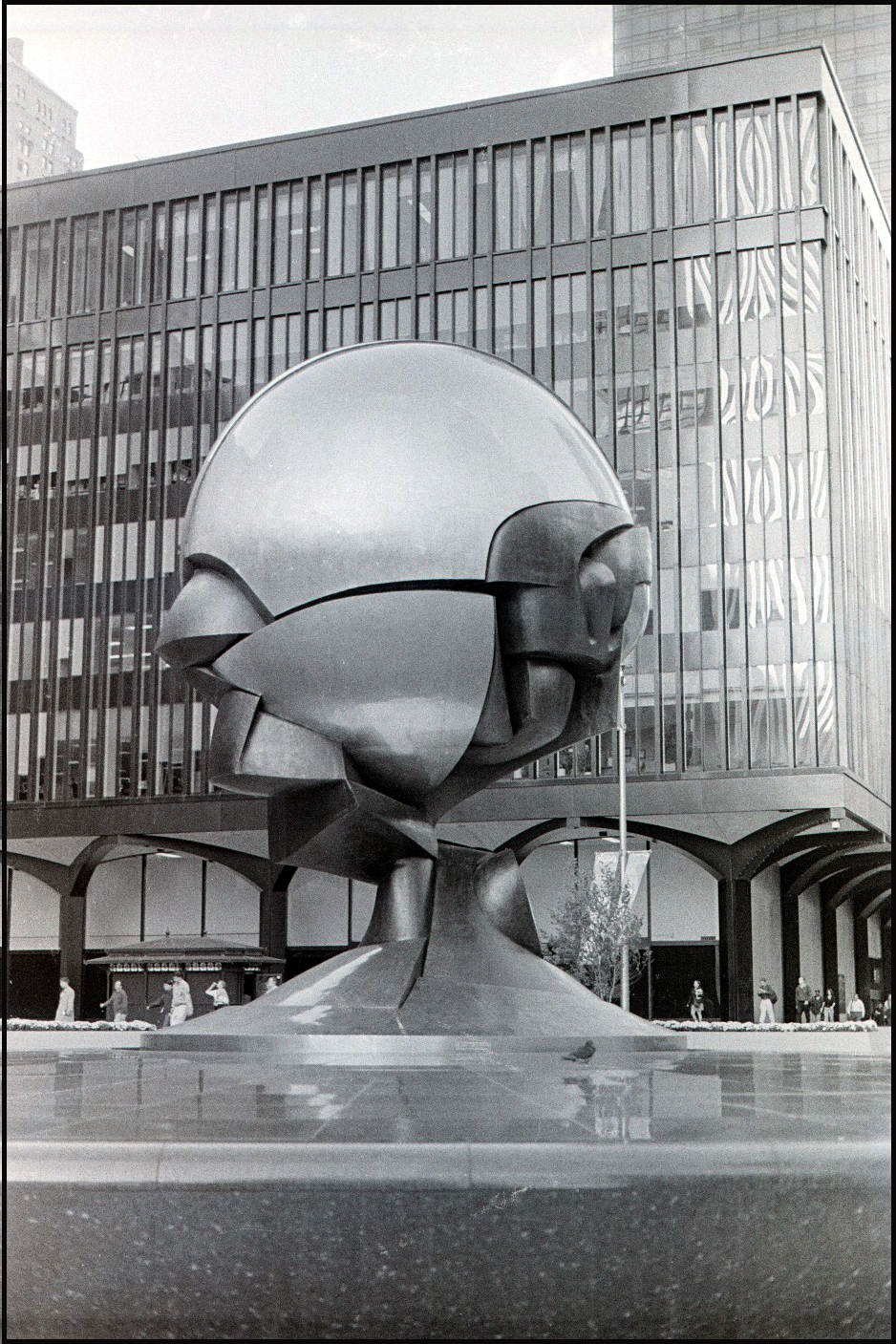
Original 5 World Trade Center building seen from the courtyard of The Sphere, 1998.

5 World Trade Center (5 WTC) was originally a steel-framed nine-story low-rise office building built in 1970–72 at New York City's World Trade Center. The building was designed by Minoru Yamasaki and Emery Roth & Sons. The structure was 118 ft (36 m) tall and had a black exterior. It suffered severe damage and partial collapse on its upper floors as a result of the September 11 attacks in 2001. The remaining structure was demolished by the Port Authority in December 2001, making way for reconstruction. The building was L-shaped and occupied the northeast corner of the World Trade Center site. Overall dimensions were 330 by 420 feet (100 by 130 m), with an average area of 120,000 square feet (11,000 m^{2}) per floor. It hosted a police desk.

The Chambers Street and World Trade Center (A, C, and E trains) subway stations were located directly east of the building, and access to the station was available through the lobby. The building's remaining underground concourse space housed The Mall at the World Trade Center. The largest Borders bookstore in New York City spread across three floors of 5 World Trade Center, on the corner of the building adjacent to the intersection of Church and Vesey Street.

In 1984, artist Joanna Gilman Hyde painted the 10,000-square-foot (930 m^{2}) canvas titled "Self Organizing Galaxy" on the roof of 5 World Trade Center, a temporary art exhibit. It took eight days to paint and was signed on October 10, 1984.

=== September 11 attacks ===
Drawing of the original World Trade Center complex. The "¬"-shaped building on the northeast corner of the site is 5 WTC.

Preliminary site plans for the World Trade Center rebuild.

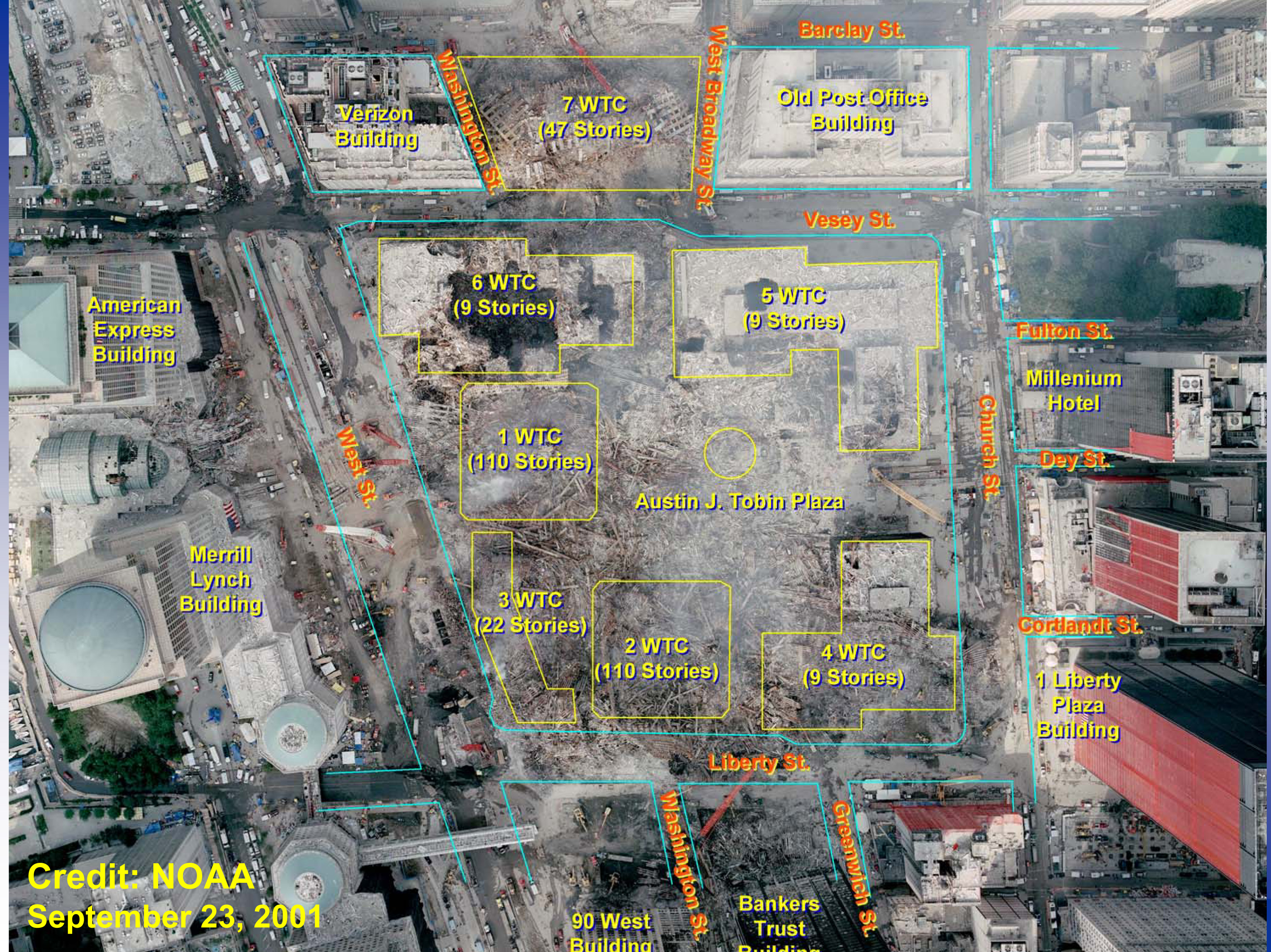
A picture showing the remnants of the World Trade Center complex. The original outline of the entire site can be seen at left.

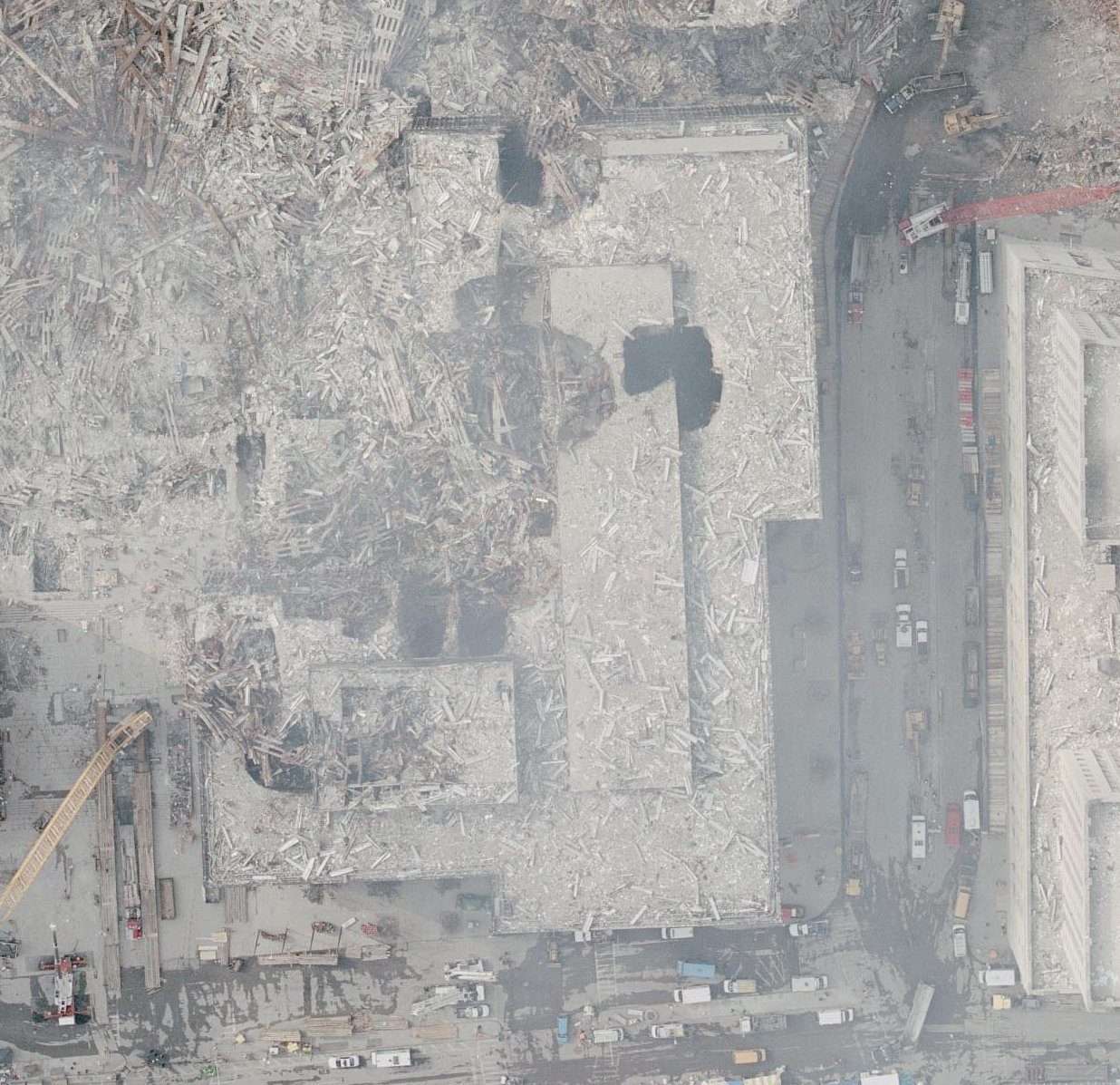
5 World Trade Center in a NOAA aerial image following September 11, 2001.

5 WTC was the least damaged building of the entire complex. Floors 4–9 suffered partial collapse and/or fire damage as a result of the September 11 attacks, while Floors 1–3 were not damaged. The building's structural integrity on its upper floors were partially compromised due to the impact of steel and other debris from the North Tower. Other collapsed sections were due to fire damage. Portions of internal collapse and burnout were found on upper floors, mainly floors 6–8. The black exterior facade suffered severe fire damage. Floors 5–9 were on fire after the collapse of the South Tower. A section of the fuselage from United Airlines Flight 175 landed on the roof and a plane engine was found in the ninth floor cafeteria. Part of the northeast corner remained standing after the attacks. The last standing section of 5 WTC was removed by December 2001.

The Federal Emergency Management Agency (FEMA)/ASCE Building Performance Study Team found that some connections between the structural steel beams failed in the fire. This was most apparent in the collapse of 5 World Trade Center, where the fireproofing did not protect the connections, causing the structure to fail. The structural failure didn't cause the entire building to collapse, as seen after the attacks that the structural skeleton remained intact.

The building was the location of the Survivors' Staircase, which was moved 200 feet along Vesey Street in 2008 to prevent further damage. In 2010, the staircase was placed inside the National September 11 Memorial & Museum, where it resides today.

2 World Trade Center will stand at the exact location where the original 5 World Trade Center once stood.

=== Tenants ===
FL#	Companies
9	Credit Suisse First Boston, Howard Publications, Council of State Governments, American Shipper, Our Planet Mgmt. Institute, Ltd., Hunan Resources & Tech. Institute
8	Credit Suisse First Boston, NYS Court of Claims, Continental Forwarding
7	Credit Suisse First Boston, U.S. Airways
6	Morgan Stanley
5	Morgan Stanley
4	Morgan Stanley
3	World Trade Center Dental, Affiliated Physicians of St. Vincent, Children's Discovery Center
2	JPMorgan Chase, FedEx, DHL
L	Borders Books & Music, Daniel Pehr, Inc., Krispy Kreme
C	Borders Books & Music, Charles Schwab, Sam Goody, Perfumeria Milano, American Airlines, Duane Reade

== New building ==
Larry Silverstein had leased the original World Trade Center from the PANYNJ on July 24, 2001. His company Silverstein Properties continued to pay rent on the site even after the September 11 attacks. In the months following the attacks, architects and urban planning experts held meetings and forums to discuss ideas for rebuilding the site. The architect Daniel Libeskind won a competition to design the master plan for the new World Trade Center in February 2003. The master plan included five towers, a 9/11 memorial, and a transportation hub. By July 2004, there were plans to build a tower named 5 World Trade Center (5 WTC) on the site of the Deutsche Bank Building, which remained standing but was slated for demolition due to heavy damage. The structure would have been about 57 stories high and contained up to 1,600,000 square feet (150,000 m^{2}) of floor space. Six plans for the new 5 WTC were devised, five of which involved converting the building to residential use. Under these plans, the building could have contained, at most, either 1,900 condominiums or 1,400 rental apartments.

The plans were delayed due to disputes over who would redevelop the five towers. The PANYNJ and Silverstein ultimately reached an agreement in 2006. Silverstein Properties ceded the rights to develop 5 and 1 WTC in exchange for financing with Liberty bonds for 2, 3, and 4 WTC. The Deutsche Bank Building began undergoing deconstruction in March 2007, which was finally completed by 2011. During this time, work along Liberty Street involved preparing the northern quadrant of the site for development. After site preparation work was done, construction began on the Vehicular Security Center and Liberty Park, which are both complete as of 2016.

=== Construction history ===
==== 2000s and 2010s plans ====
On June 22, 2007, the Port Authority announced that JPMorgan Chase would spend $290 million to lease the site until 2011 for construction of a 42-story building. Following JPMorgan Chase's acquisition of Bear Stearns in March 2008, the company announced plans to use Bear Stearns' existing headquarters at 383 Madison Avenue as its new headquarters for J.P. Morgan Investment Bank. The company abandoned plans to occupy a skyscraper at 130 Liberty Street. A proposal to convert the planned office tower into a residential or mixed-use tower was explored instead. On May 1, 2008, deconstruction of the former Deutsche Bank building resumed.

By May 2009, the Port Authority was seeking to reduce the size of 2 and 3 WTC and postpone the construction of 5 WTC, citing the Great Recession and disagreements with Silverstein. The developer had requested that the Port Authority fund two of the towers, but the agency wanted to provide funding for only one tower. New York City mayor Michael Bloomberg attempted to mediate the dispute with little success. It was proposed in July 2009 to move the planned construction site for the Performing Arts Center to the 130 Liberty Street location, but these plans were later rejected. Also in July 2009, Silverstein wrote a letter to the development's stakeholders, recommending that the dispute go to arbitration. Silverstein officially requested arbitration the next month. He requested that the Port Authority pay $2.7 billion in damages. An arbitration panel ruled in January 2010 that the agency did not owe him any damages. However, the panel also voided a clause that would have forced Silverstein to hand over the towers to Port Authority if they were not completed by 2014.

The Port Authority announced in March 2010 that it had assumed responsibility for the development of 5 World Trade Center, in addition to One World Trade Center, the National September 11 Memorial & Museum, the transportation hub, and other site infrastructure. Towers 2, 3, and 4 would continue to be developed by Silverstein Properties. Later that year, New York University had expressed interest in expanding to 5 World Trade Center as part of its NYU 2031 program. These plans were also eventually rejected. The deconstruction of the Deutsche Bank Building was completed in February 2011, and construction of another World Trade Center project, the Vehicular Security Center and Tour Bus Parking Facilities began. Development of the site was officially given to the Port Authority of New York and New Jersey. On September 1, 2011, the Port Authority of New York and New Jersey began construction to incorporate the site into the new WTC development, acting as its developer.

Governor Andrew Cuomo signed an agreement in October 2011 to rebuild the St. Nicholas Greek Orthodox Church in Liberty Park. The church would be located adjacent to the future Liberty Park, which would be built on top of the Vehicular Security Center. That December, Phase 2 construction of the South bathtub, located on the site of 130 Liberty Street, continued with the excavation and concrete placement. By mid-2013, the ground was prepared for construction. A walkway that is next to the site of 5 WTC would be constructed into a supermarket. By 2014, the ground had been transformed into parking spaces for vehicles belonging to the Port Authority Police Department (PAPD). According to the agency, this usage of the site is only temporary.

==== Revival of plans ====
In June 2019, a joint RFP was issued following a deal between Port Authority of New York and New Jersey and the Lower Manhattan Development Corporation with the agencies to split the proceeds. In November 2019 a possible partnership between Silverstein Properties and Brookfield Properties was reported to develop the site. That partnership was confirmed in February 2021, and a new design was unveiled, with construction slated to begin in 2023. Silverstein Properties was considering two options for the site: a 60-story tower with 810 affordable housing apartments, and an 80-story tower with 1,620 apartments.

By early 2023, the plan called for 25 percent of the building's apartments to be affordable housing units, prompting concerns from organizations such as Coalition for a 100% Affordable 5WTC. Members of the coalition wished for the tower to be composed entirely of affordable housing to accommodate first responders and survivors of the September 11 attacks. The state agreed in May 2023 to set aside 30 percent of apartments, or 360 units, as affordable housing, but it also raised the minimum and maximum income thresholds for the affordable housing units. The Public Authorities Control Board approved plans for the building in July 2023; the proposal included 1,200 residences, of which 400 would be affordable housing units. Twenty percent of the affordable apartments would be reserved for people who worked or lived in Lower Manhattan when the September 11 attacks occurred. Due to increasing costs, development of 5 WTC had stalled by 2026.

=== Design ===
The original design for the tower was by Kohn Pedersen Fox, and called for a 42-story building with a seven-floor cantilevered section starting at the 12th floor. This section of the building would have housed JPMorgan Chase's large trading floors, rising above the St. Nicholas Greek Orthodox Church, and would be taller than 7 World Trade Center. As of September 2013, the Lower Manhattan Development Corporation and Port Authority were actively marketing the site, but had not released any information about the building.

In June 2018, New York YIMBY reported on a new design for the tower, after a rendering was spotted on a fence surrounding the construction site, hinting an announcement from the Port Authority may be coming soon. According to the article, it is "a glassy building with a triangular motif reminiscent of the David Childs-designed 1 WTC. The depiction is roughly 70 stories in height, which could indicate yet another supertall is planned for the area."

In February 2021, a new design was announced for the new 5 World Trade Center to be developed by Silverstein Properties and Brookfield Properties. The new design calls for a 910-foot (280 m) tall mixed use tower rising 80 stories. The tower will consist mainly of 1,200,000 square feet (110,000 m^{2}) of residential space spread over 69 floors, numbering 1,325 units, with 30 percent or roughly 360 units of the apartments being set aside for permanent affordable housing. The base of the tower will include the lobbies, 7,000 square feet (650 m^{2}) of retail, 55,000 square feet (5,100 m^{2}) of public amenity space spread across 2 floors, a floor with 12,000 square feet (1,100 m^{2}) of public space and 190,000 square feet (18,000 m^{2}) of office space spread across 6 floors. At the time, construction was scheduled to begin in 2024 and take five years. Scale models of the building were publicly revealed in September 2024, although Silverstein was still trying to secure funding for the tower at the time.

In March 2026 the Port Authority announced plans for the building were currently on pause due to rising costs.

== See also ==
- List of tallest buildings in New York City
