= Deutsche Bank Building =

Former skyscraper in Manhattan, New York

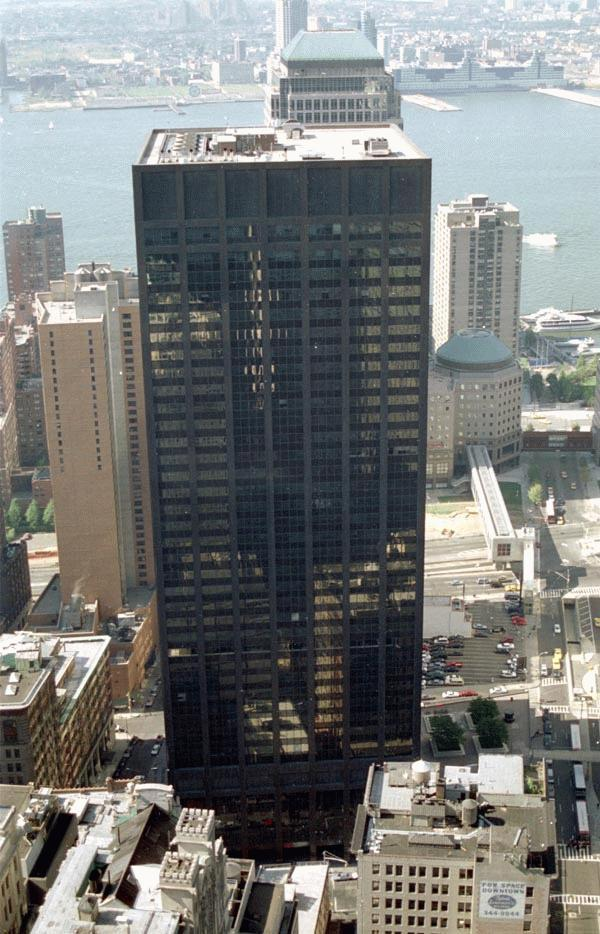
- View from the southeast in 1997
- Former names: Bankers Trust Plaza
- Alternative names: 130 Liberty Street

General information
- Status: Demolished
- Type: Office
- Location: 130 Liberty Street, Manhattan, New York, United States 10007
- Coordinates: 40°42′35″N 74°00′48″W
- Construction started: 1971
- Completed: 1973
- Opening: 1974
- Closed: September 11, 2001
- Demolished: March 2007–January 2011
- Cost: $120 million
- Owner: Deutsche Bank

Height
- Roof: 535 ft (163 m)

Technical details
- Floor count: 39
- Lifts/elevators: 18

Design and construction
- Architect: Shreve, Lamb and Harmon
- Developer: Bankers Trust
- Structural engineer: James Ruderman
- Main contractor: Turner Construction Company

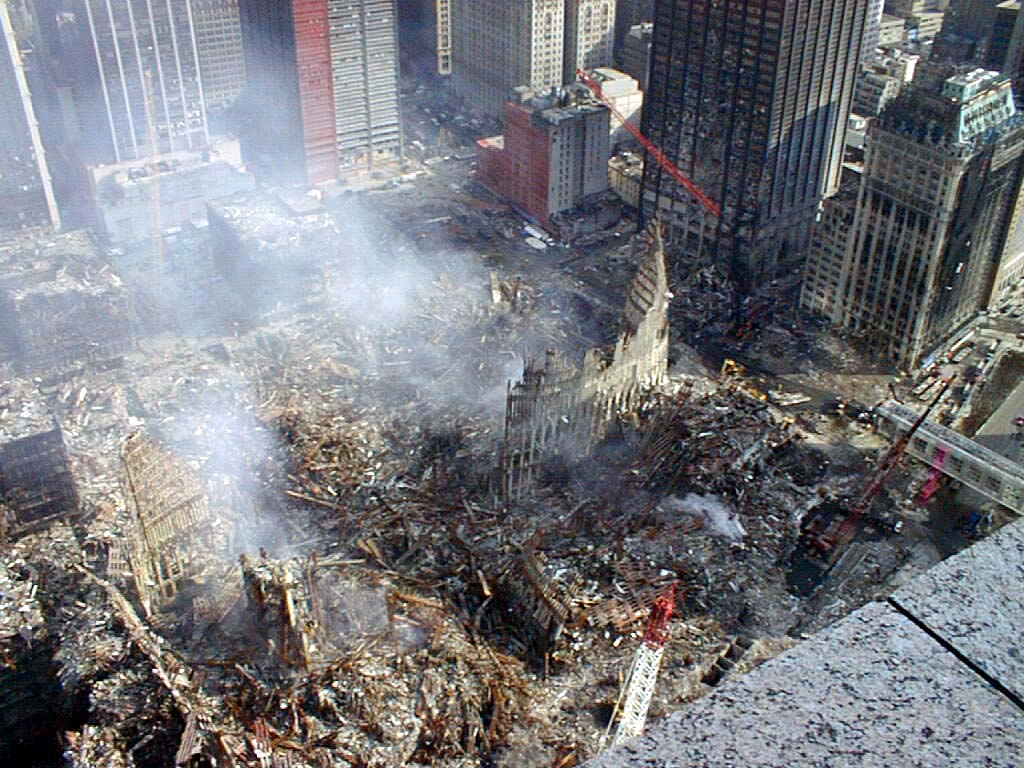
Overview of the site following the attacks. The Deutsche Bank Building is visible behind an angled red crane.

The Deutsche Bank Building (formerly Bankers Trust Plaza) was a 39-story office building located at 130 Liberty Street in Manhattan, New York City, adjacent to the World Trade Center site. The building opened in 1974 and closed following the September 11 attacks in 2001, due to contamination that spread from the collapse of the South Tower. The structure was designed by Shreve, Lamb & Harmon, which also designed the Empire State Building.

The building was purchased by Deutsche Bank when it acquired Bankers Trust in 1998. It was part of the skyline of Lower Manhattan, and was demolished between 2007 and 2011. 5 World Trade Center will eventually replace the building, expanding the ground space on which the World Trade Center stands, as this land was not part of the original World Trade Center.

== September 11th ==
The collapse of the South Tower during the September 11 attacks tore a 24-story gash into the facade of the building, knocked out a load-bearing column, and destroyed 158,000 square feet of floor space. Additionally, an elevated plaza that was located at the base of the building was destroyed by the collapse.

One person is known to have died within the building during the attacks.

== After the September 11 attacks ==
=== Plans ===
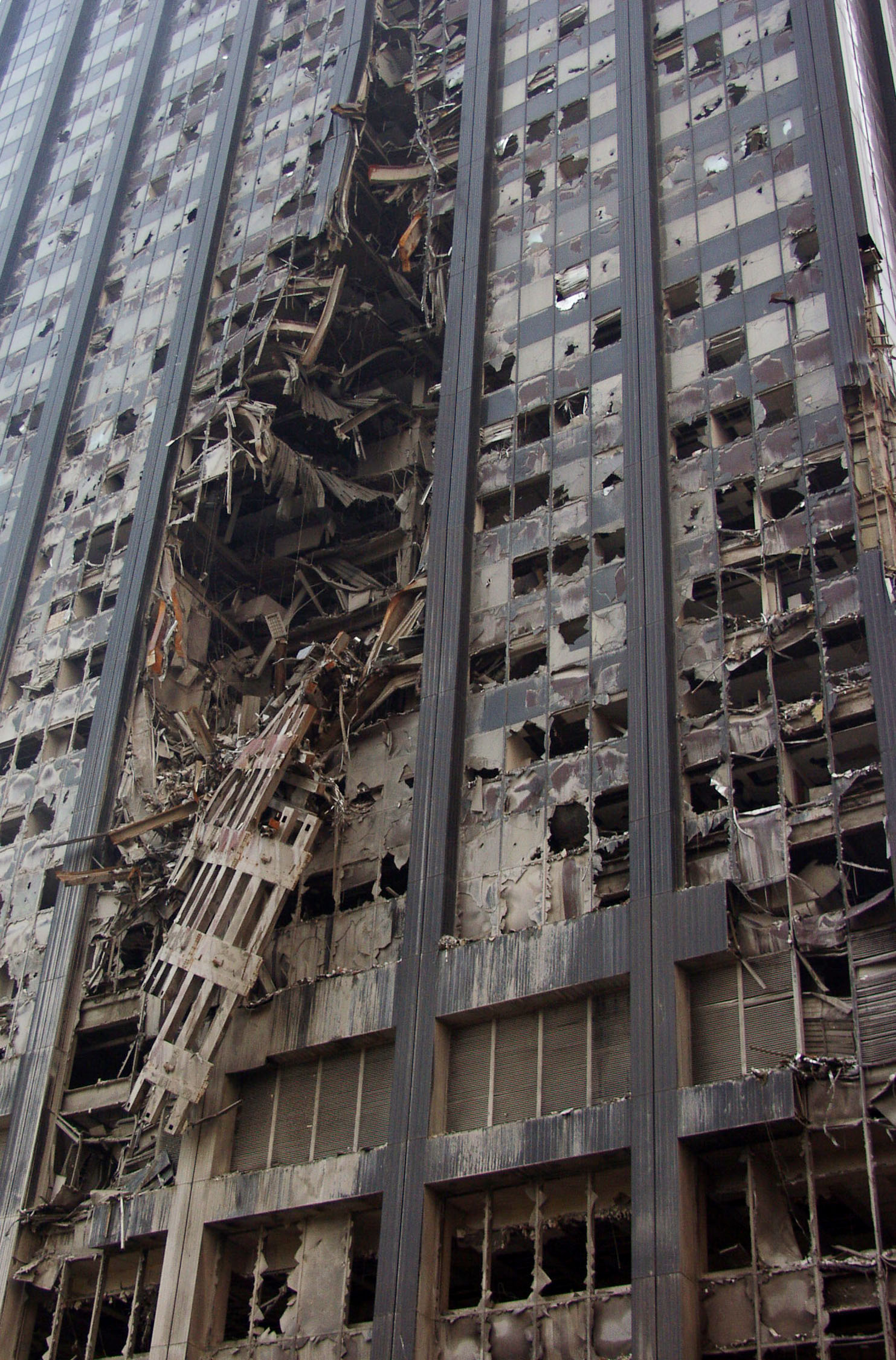
Detail of gash in the facade imparted by the collapse of the World Trade Center. A segment of the South Tower's exterior columns is visible hanging from the gash.

Steel and concrete protruded from the building for months afterward, which was eventually cleaned up. However, due to extensive contamination, Deutsche Bank decided that the 39-story ruin was to be taken down. During the cleanup and recovery period, netting was placed inside gashes and holes to prevent collapse. The owner maintained that the building could not be restored to habitable condition, while its insurers sought to treat the incident as recoverable damage rather than a total loss. Work on the building was deferred for over two years during which the condition of the building deteriorated.

In June 2002, the city reached an agreement with Deutsche Bank to begin a search for remains within the damaged building, following the main cleanup at Ground Zero. In an on-going search effort for the victims, three bone fragments were initially discovered on the roof in August 2002. More human remains were discovered again in September 2005, and in March 2006, construction workers found more bone fragments and remains. This prompted calls from victims' family members for another search of the building by forensic experts. Between April 7–14, 2006, more than 700 human bone fragments were discovered in the ballast gravel on the roof, and again in 2007.

The cost of demolition had steadily increased to $75 million by Bovis Lend Lease, as large amounts of asbestos, dioxins, lead, silica, quartz, polycyclic aromatic hydrocarbons, chromium, and manganese had been found within the building.

=== Demolition ===
In 2004, an agreement was announced to settle the disposition of the building and insurance claims. As part of this agreement, the Lower Manhattan Development Corporation acquired the land to commence demolition work. On December 7, 2006, the Associated Press reported that the building would be dismantled. The report indicated that nearby residents were fearful of possible toxic dust associated with the Twin Towers within the building.

Dismantling of the building began in March 2007, but on May 17, 2007, work was halted after a 22-foot section of pipe fell 35 stories and landed on the roof of "The Ten House", home to Engine 10 and Ladder 10 of the New York City Fire Department. Two firefighters were injured by falling debris, although they were not struck by the pipe itself.

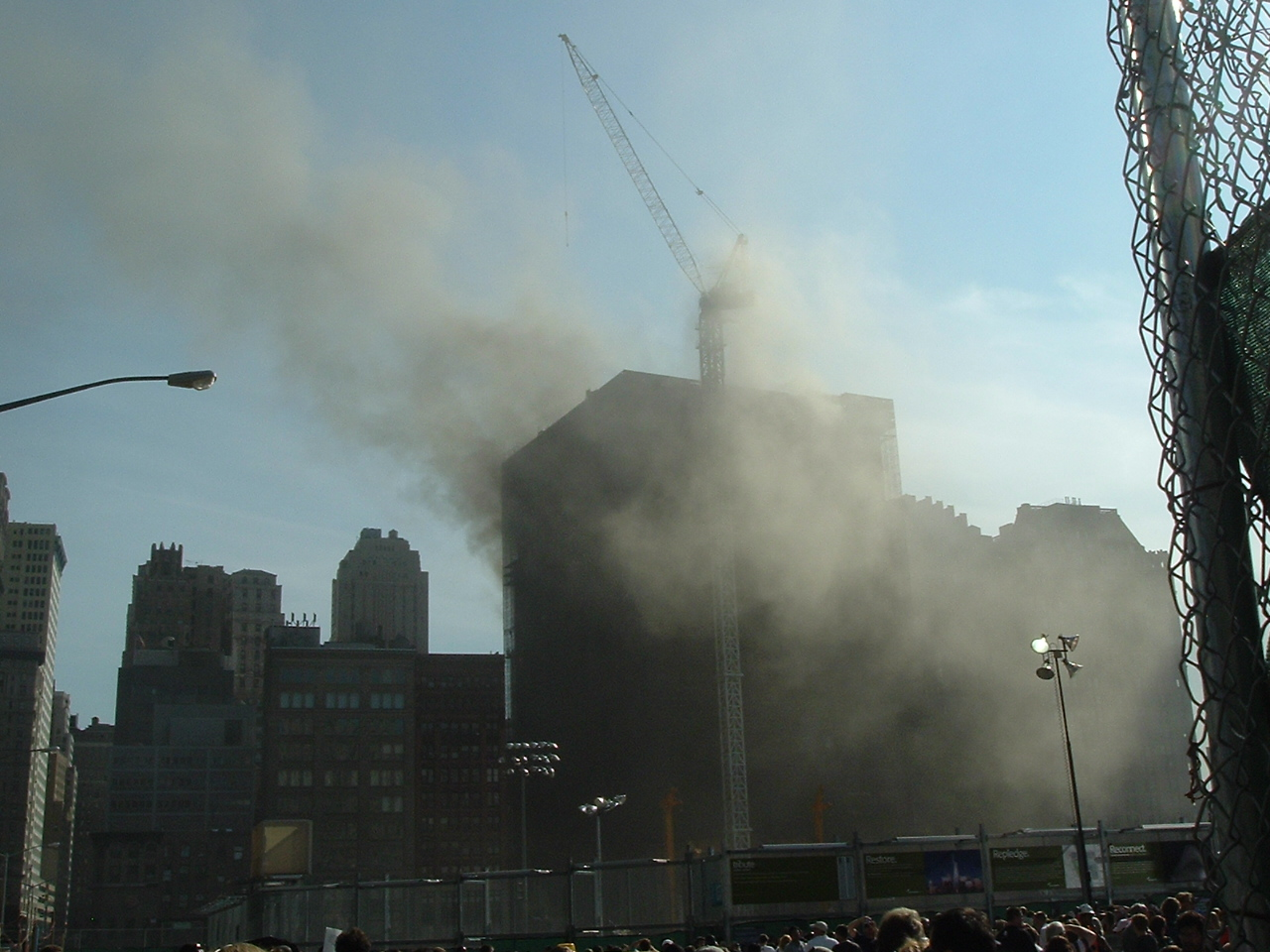
View of the building during the fire of August 18, 2007

On August 18, 2007, at approximately 3:40 pm, a seven-alarm fire broke out on the 17th floor of the building, caused by workers smoking in violation of the building's safety rules. Around this time, crews were removing one floor per week, and the building had only 26 more. At the time of the fire, crews were removing asbestos. The fire spread in both directions, affecting a total of 10 floors. The floors were also filled with a maze of protective polyethylene sheets, which were designed to prevent the spread of asbestos, and also trapped smoke. The building lacked a standpipe due to workers cutting the pipes needed to supply water to the building, making it extremely difficult to put out the fire. The building had not been inspected since March, when it should have been inspected every 15 days. The fire burned into the night before being extinguished, and numerous special and support units responded from the New York City Fire Department to combat the fire. The fire killed two FDNY firefighters, Robert Beddia of Engine Company 24, and Joseph Graffagnino of Ladder Company 5, who succumbed on the 14th floor to smoke inhalation and carbon monoxide poisoning. The fire also injured 115 other firefighters, 46 of which were seriously injured enough to require medical leave. Plans to demolish the building continued as quickly as possible. In 2008, the Manhattan District Attorney indicted three construction supervisors and the demolition subcontractor, John Galt Corporation. A city stop-work order was lifted in April 2008 and decontamination work began again in May of the same year. The fire emergency plan filed with the city, had various chapters sending the reader in circles ending up on a page that said call 911, and had no other plan for fire evacuation.

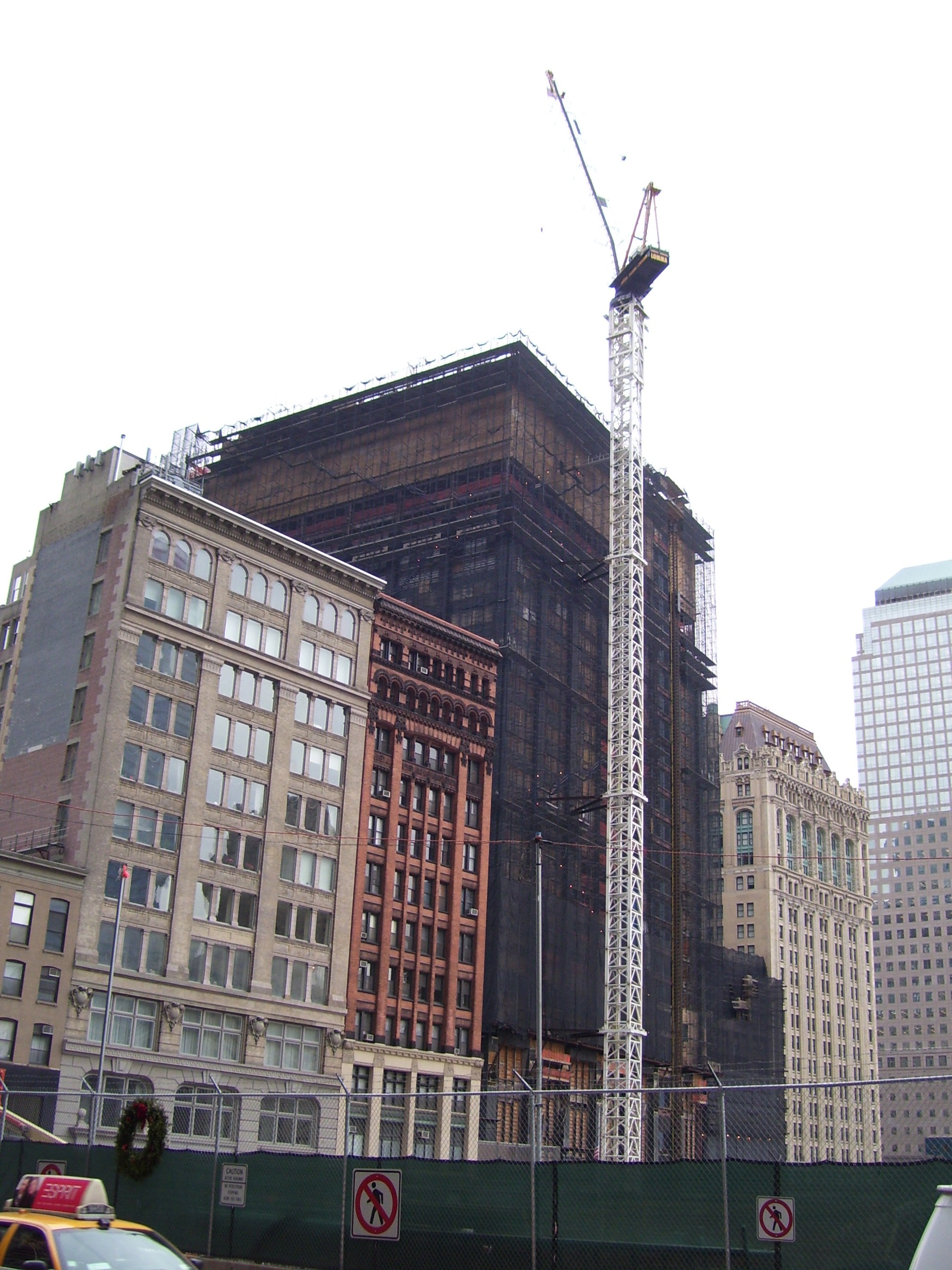
Dismantling in January 2008

Dismantling was originally scheduled to be completed by the end of 2008, and later by the end of 2010. In October 2009, it was announced that dismantling of the building would finally resume.

Demolition was completed on January 20, 2011, with the removal of the crane. Demolition of the first floor and foundation was finished on February 28, 2011. It was the last part of the building to be removed.

== Future ==
The Port Authority of New York and New Jersey took over the site as its developer. The site is occupied by the Vehicular Security Center and Liberty Park, while the 5 World Trade Center is in the planning stages.

=== 5 World Trade Center ===
On June 14, 2007, Bloomberg and then-Governor Eliot Spitzer announced that JPMorgan Chase had won the bid to buy and build the new tower at 130 Liberty Street to replace the Deutsche Bank Building. However, after the acquisition of Bear Stearns by JPMorgan Chase in March 2008, the future of 130 Liberty Street has been put into question as JPMorgan Chase has announced that it intends to move into Bear Stearns' old headquarters at 383 Madison Avenue. If JPMorgan Chase does not renew their bid, the site would likely be used for a residential or hotel tower, as per Bloomberg's plan prior to JPMorgan Chase's bid. Recently, community and civic leaders met to discuss the site's future with community leaders favoring a hotel or residential development and outgoing deputy mayor Robert Lieber favoring an office tower.

=== Church and Vehicular Security Center ===
On October 14, 2011, the Port Authority of New York and New Jersey, which controls rebuilding at Ground Zero, and St. Nicholas Greek Orthodox Church announced an agreement that allows the church to build a 4,100-square-foot church and interfaith bereavement center at 130 Liberty Street. The original church, which was located at 155 Cedar Street and founded by Greek immigrants in 1916, was the only religious building to be completely destroyed during the September 11 attacks. Construction restarted after a several year pause on August 3, 2020, with an aim to be completed by the 20th anniversary of the attacks in 2021. The church was ultimately consecrated on July 4, 2022 and was fully completed in December 2022.

Delays in taking down the Deutsche Bank at Ground Zero forced the Port Authority to delay the expected completion date of the crucial Vehicular Security Center. Repeated delays had also added roughly $100 million to the cost of rebuilding the World Trade Center. Originally projected to open in 2013, it opened in June 2016 following the completion of Liberty Park, which is on top of the garage.

== See also ==
- Collapse of the World Trade Center
- Health effects arising from the September 11 attacks
- Verizon Building
- 90 West Street
- List of tallest voluntarily demolished buildings
