= Vehicular Security Center =

Parking lot and security checkpoint in Manhattan, New York

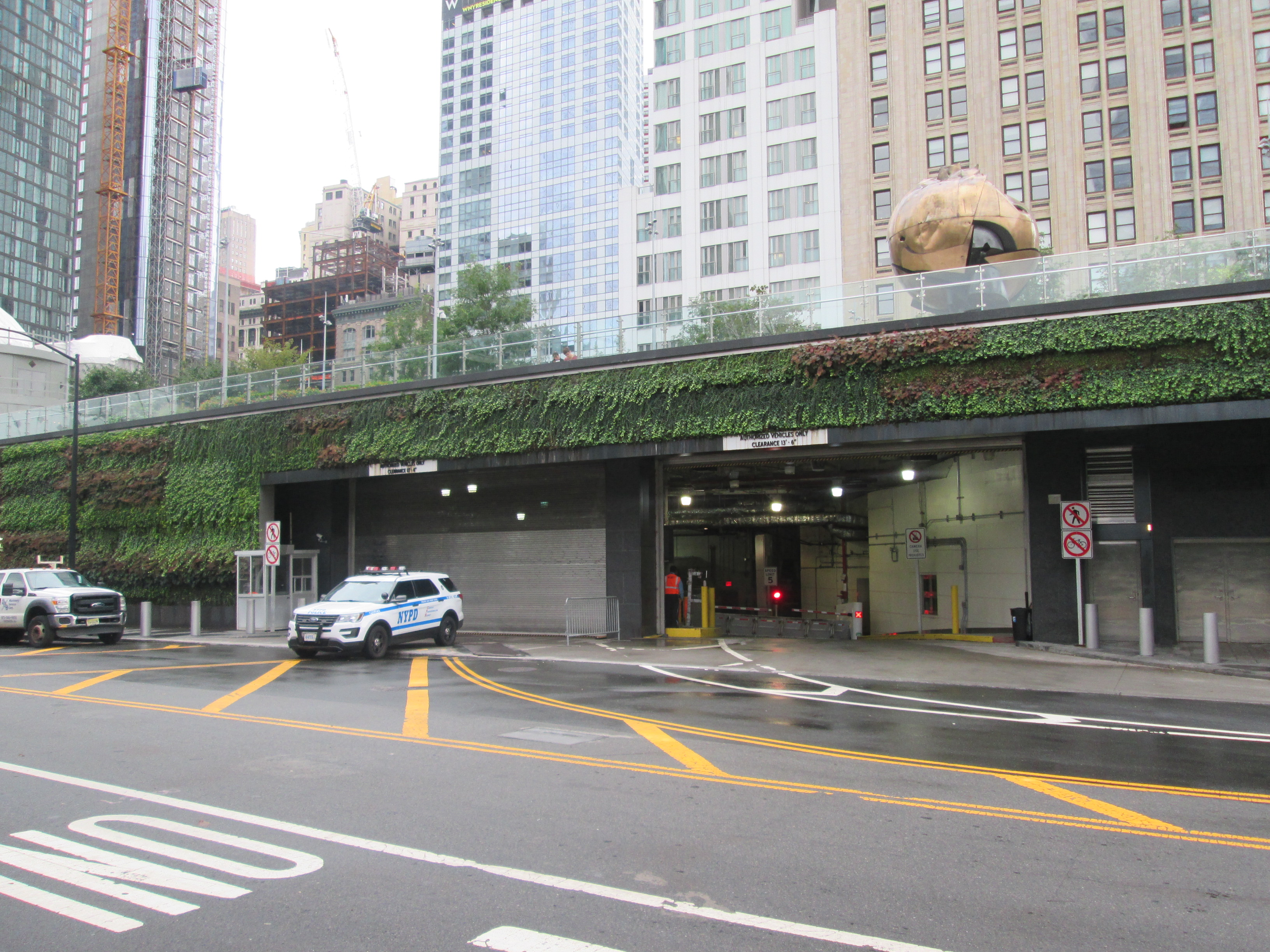
- Entrance, seen in September 2018
- Interactive map of the Vehicular Security Center area

General information
- Status: Completed
- Location: 150 Liberty Street; Manhattan, New York City, United States
- Coordinates: 40°42′37″N 74°0′49″W
- Construction started: November 10, 2011; 14 years ago
- Completed: 2013; 13 years ago
- Opened: 2017; 9 years ago (Liberty Park completed)
- Cost: $667 million ($955 million in 2025 dollars)
- Owner: Port Authority of New York and New Jersey

Height
- Height: 25 ft (7.6 m) (above street-level)

The World Trade Center Vehicle Security Center and Tour Bus Parking Facility, or simply the Vehicular Security Center (VSC), is a secure complex for truck delivery and underground parking at the World Trade Center in Manhattan, New York City. The entrance to the VSC is located at street-level along the southern edge of the National September 11 Memorial & Museum on Liberty Street. The VSC is connected via tunnels that feed the entire 16-acre (65,000 m^{2}) WTC complex, linking the security checkpoint at its entrance with the buildings and services at the complex requiring vehicular services. Underground garages provide parking for tenants, visitors, and tour buses.

Liberty Park, an elevated 1-acre (4,000 m^{2}) park, is on the roof of the VSC. St. Nicholas Greek Orthodox Church, which was destroyed during the September 11 attacks, was rebuilt in Liberty Park above the VSC.

In 2010, a ship from the eighteenth century was found during excavation work at the site. The ship, believed to be a Hudson River sloop, was found just south of where the Twin Towers used to stand, about 20 feet (6.1 m) below the surface.

Five World Trade Center is planned to be built adjacent to the southern edge of the VSC and Liberty Park, on the site of the former Deutsche Bank Building. It was approved in February 2021.

== See also ==
- Liberty Park (Manhattan)
- Project Rebirth
- World Trade Center
- World Trade Center in popular culture
