= WhIsBe =

American Street Artist

WhIsBe (artist)
- Born: New York, NY
- Known for: street art, contemporary art, collaborations
- Movement: contemporary art, street art
- Website: www.whisbeworldwide.com

WhIsBe is a New York City-based street artist of unverified identity known both for his street and fine art. His work included in several museum collections and public installation spaces, including: The New Museum in New York, MOCO Museum in Amsterdam and real estate developer Larry Silverstein's rebuilt World Trade Center complex. In 2014, WhIsBe's work was included in the Governors Ball Music Festival on Randall's Island and in 2017, he installed a 7-foot sculpture in the lobby of the 4 World Trade Center building.

== Street Art ==
Inspired by Andy Warhol’s use of commercial imagery and Jean-Michel Basquiat’s disruption of public space, WhIsBe wanted to share his message with a wide range of people and began putting up illegal work on the streets in 2011. He first gained notoriety for his "McDictator" image—a mashup of Ronald McDonald’s iconic clown face and Adolf Hitler’s body frozen in heil salute—commenting on, as The Huffington Post describes, "the McDonaldization of America."

Taking known images and making subtle alterations to their design, WhIsBe changes the intended meaning of the image and adds his own, often political, commentary. In his Vandal Gummy series, WhIsBe places an image of a candy gummy bear against a prison mugshot background. The juxtaposition between the harshness of the Department of Corrections and the innocence of the piece of candy encourages viewers to examine institutions and has become a hallmark of WhIsBe's body of work.

== Charity Work and Corporate Partnerships ==
WhIsBe has partnered with charities and corporations ranging from the ArtWorks Charity Foundation to Charity: Water to Red Bull and has exhibited work at notable events including: the Governors Ball Music Festival, Art Basel through Castle Fitzjohns Gallery and Art Southampton through the Keszler Gallery. In 2016, he collaborated with the New Museum in New York City to create a large-scale sculptural installation of his Vandal Gummies as well as a series of limited-edition prints.

== NFTs ==
WhIsBe has been selling his art as NFTs since 2021. His iconic gummy bears have been auctioned in various platforms, including Nifty Gateway and OpenSea. His iconic unique (1/1) Gold gummy bear is exhibited at Moco Museum, Amsterdam, Netherlands. WhIsbe also partnered with auction house Sotheby's, helping them launching their dedicated digital art platform.
