= Kozo Nishino =

Japanese sculptor and kinetic artist

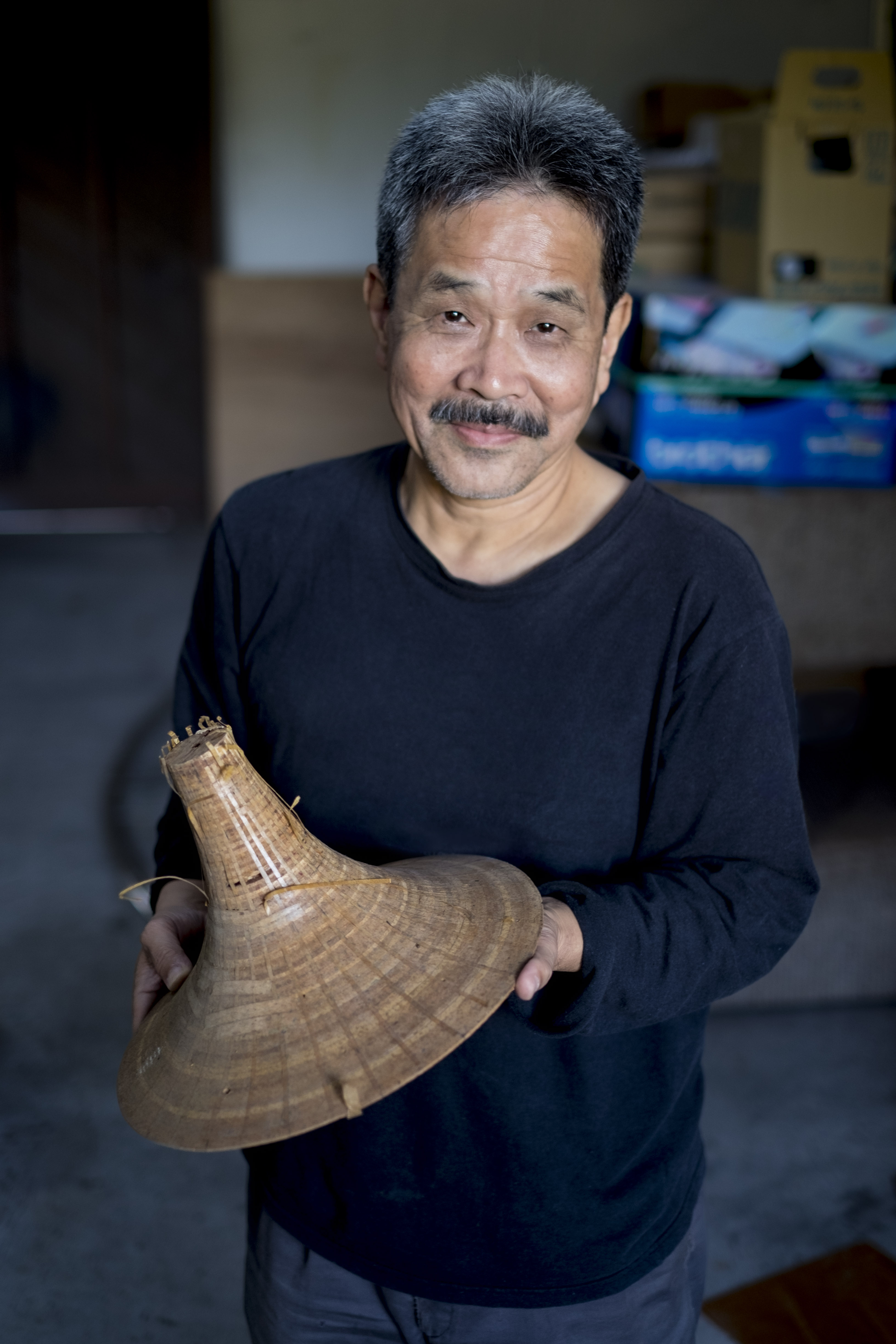
- Nishino in 2014
- Born: 7 August 1951 (age 74); Hyogo, Japan
- Occupation(s): Artist, sculptor
- Years active: 1984–present

Kozo Nishino (born 1951) is a Japanese sculptor and kinetic artist born in Hyogo Prefecture. He graduated from the Department of Sculpture at the Kyoto City University of Arts in 1977.

== Notable works ==
He has numerous large-scale public works throughout Japan. He was featured in the Echigo-Tsumari Art Field.

His large scale public work titled, In the Wind, is a metallic sculpture of a saxophone. He originally created it in 1988 and the work was presented in Kobe. The work was recreated in 2003 in front of the Museum of Modern Art, Saitama.

In 2013, he was commissioned and created a 30-meter-diameter titanium arc in the 4 World Trade Center building which faces the 9/11 Memorial Museum in New York City.

In 2018, Nishino created a series of kinetic public art works, including Breezing in Canberra and In the Stream, at the National Arboretum in Canberra, Australia.
