= Ellen Driscoll =

American artist

- Born: 1953 (age 72–73); Boston, Massachusetts, US
- Education: Columbia University, Wesleyan University
- Known for: Sculpture, installation art, public art, drawing
- Spouse: Steven Manning
- Awards: Guggenheim Fellowship, Anonymous Was a Woman Award, Harvard Radcliffe Institute, National Endowment for the Arts
- Website: Ellen Driscoll

Ellen Driscoll, FastForwardFossil; Part 2, #2 harvested plastic, 30'L x 7'H x 14'W, 2009, Smack Mellon.

Ellen Driscoll (born 1953) is a New York-based American artist, whose practice encompasses sculpture, drawing, installation and public art. She is known for complex, interconnected works that explore social and geopolitical issues and events involving power, agency, transition and ecological imbalance through an inventive combination of materials, technologies (rudimentary to digital), research and narrative. Her artwork often presents the familiar from unexpected points of view—bridging different eras and cultures or connecting personal, intimate acts to global consequences—through visual strategies involving light and shadow, silhouette, shifts in scale, metaphor and synecdoche. In 2000, Sculpture critic Patricia C. Phillips wrote that Driscoll's installations were informed by "an abiding fascination with the lives and stories of people whose voices and visions have been suspended, thwarted, undermined, or regulated." Discussing later work, Jennifer McGregor wrote, "Whether working in ghostly white plastic, mosaic, or walnut and sumi inks, [Driscoll's] projects fluidly map place and time while mining historical, environmental, and cultural themes."

Driscoll has been awarded fellowships from the Guggenheim Foundation, Harvard Radcliffe Institute, Anonymous Was a Woman, and National Endowment for the Arts, among others. She has exhibited at venues including the Whitney Museum at Phillip Morris, New-York Historical Society, Boston Center for the Arts, Contemporary Arts Center, and Smack Mellon. Her work belongs to public collections including the Metropolitan Museum of Art and Whitney Museum.

== Early life and career ==
Driscoll was born in 1953 into a large Irish-Catholic family in Boston, Massachusetts. After studying painting and sculpture at Wesleyan University (BFA, 1974), she moved to New York, where she earned an MFA in sculpture from Columbia University (1980) and worked for artists Alice Adams, Ursula von Rydingsvard, Mary Miss and Columbia professor and sculptor William G. Tucker. Her early sculpture was abstract and inspired by furniture and architecture. In the 1980s, she exhibited in group shows at the Metropolitan Museum of Art, SculptureCenter, The Aldrich Contemporary Art Museum, and DeCordova Museum and Sculpture Park, among other venues.

Between 1987 and 1990, solo exhibitions at the Damon Brandt, Paolo Salvador (both New York) and Stavaridis (Boston) galleries brought Driscoll recognition for more organic wood, lead and copper sculptures with a medieval sensibility that explored cultural memory and alchemy. These archetypal, sometimes foreboding objects—resembling totems, obelisks, horns, gyres, and vessels—suggested archeological artifacts or tools, their functions inexplicable or long-forgotten. Driscoll frequently blackened or covered the sculptures with skins of lead and oxidized copper whose ornamental, handcrafted effect contrasted with their primal form. Reviews described them as both elegant and primitive with a "strange eloquence"; New York Times critic Michael Brenson called them "organic, anthropomorphic machines" conveying humor and impressions of "destruction and renewal, victory and defeat."

During this period, Driscoll began teaching sculpture, principally at Rhode Island School of Design, where she would serve as a professor from 1992 to 2013. In 2013, she joined the faculty of Bard College as a professor and program director of studio arts.

== Work and reception ==
Ellen Driscoll, The Loophole of Retreat, view of walk-in end of 8' x 8' x 13' camera obscura, wood, and objects circulating above on a wheel, 1991, Whitney Museum at Phillip Morris.

=== Installation works, 1990s ===
By the early 1990s, critics such as The New York Times's Charles Hagen noted Driscoll's turn toward installation art bringing "her awareness of the expressive possibilities of abstract shape and her sensitivity to material" to bear on politically and psychologically resonant historical events. This new conceptual work examined themes involving boundary crossing, social and personal histories, knowledge and its relation to memory, experience and sensation.

In three installations, Driscoll combined projected imagery, kinetic constellations of objects and symbolic groupings, creating fluid experiences described as "a cross between primitive filmmaking and antique hallucinations." The Loophole of Retreat (Whitney Museum at Philip Morris, 1991) was inspired by the Harriet Jacobs autobiography Incidents in the Life of a Slave Girl (1861), which traced her journey from slavery and sexual abuse, through seven years of hiding (in the dark, oppressive eaves above her grandmother’s house, her only contact with the world a small peephole), and finally, freedom. The installation's centerpiece was a large cone with a door that was constructed of salvaged wooden planks and placed on its side, which echoed Jacobs's claustrophobic hiding space. A small hole turned its interior into a camera obscura projecting enigmatic, Plato's cave-like images of suspended objects rotating on a large wheel outside the dwelling; a portico of floating, battered doric columns casting shadowy forms surrounded the structure. Critics suggested the work's central inside-out metaphor addressed historical facts of slavery and racism while touching on broader, relevant psychological and perceptual ideas, such as the relationship between vision and power, contradictions between physical constraint and psychological freedom, and the ultimate loneliness of individual experience.

Driscoll used similar means in Migration (Contemporary Arts Center and MassArt, 1992–3) and Passionate Attitudes (Thread Waxing Space and Real Art Ways, 1995). The latter work examined early studies of the female body and psyche conducted by neurophysician J. M. Charcot, in which he used hypnosis, probes and electrical stimulation to induce states of the 19th-century medical construct hysteria in women patients. The installation—described as "nearly omnivorous in its intellectual appetite" by Art in America's Nancy Princenthal—featured fabric chambers set into heavy-steel frames of hospital beds that functioned as camera obscuras, projecting ethereal images of a slowly turning constellation of objects, including spinning braids, onto suspended pillows.

Three collaborative projects similarly gave voice to the under-represented. From There On Up to Here and Now (1994, High Museum of Art) was an installation that Driscoll created with African-American quilters in the Atlanta area focusing on personal iconography and histories. For Ahab's Wife (Snug Harbor Cultural Center, 1998), she reimagined that undeveloped, silent female character from Melville's Moby-Dick as an explorer with a powerful presence; the project's performance work and exhibition was anchored by an enormous hoopskirt that mutated between clothing, platform, shelter, screen, blowhole and a roiling sea engulfing and disgorging the heroine. The temporary public project, Mum’s the Word (Boston, 1998) placed 48 paired outdoor banners created in collaboration with aphasia patients on bridges, which served as metaphors for brain-related communication disorder.

Ellen Driscoll, As Above, So Below, Lenape creation story, mosaic, 1998, 45th St. crosspassage, Grand Central Terminal, New York.

=== Public art projects ===
Driscoll has produced a number of permanent public artworks that engage the specific geography and history of their sites, while also connecting to universal themes involving movement across time and place. As Above, So Below (1992–9, MTA Arts for Transit) is a suite of thirteen large mosaic, glass and bronze murals and related reliefs installed in the northern passageways of New York's Grand Central Terminal (at 45th, 47th and 48th streets) that combine iconic forms, multicultural designs, and photographic imagery digitized to pointillist effect. The overall work forms a visual anthology of ancient and modern cosmological stories that relates to the terminal concourse's historic painted constellation ceiling and connects the daily commute to global time travel; its depicted subjects include Aboriginal and Celtic narratives, the Egyptian goddess Nut, Persephone, Sisyphus, Einstein, and a recurrent train traveling a circular path.

Catching the Drift (2003) and Aqueous Humour (2004) involved water-related themes. For the former, Driscoll created a fanciful aquatic environment in a women’s restroom at Smith College's Brown Fine Arts Center employing blue slip-glaze imagery of waves, fishing nets, hooks, sea life and artworks from the museum's collection that extended to sinks, toilets and an encircling frieze of glass panels. Aqueous Humour consisted of three interactive mosaic tables in the South Boston Maritime Park, built with movable outer rings that shifted port-related fishing, immigration and marine biology designs.

Filament/Firmament (2007, Cambridge Public Library) and Wingspun (2008) involved socio-historical approaches. The former is a two-story installation examining women's work (textile arts, in particular), roles and contributions to the city of Cambridge through text, 240 circles of etched glass depicting global textile designs, and a geometric network of woven tension cables suggesting interconnectivity. Wingspun is an 800-foot glass mural portraying inhabitants throughout North Carolina's history that serves as a membrane between the Raleigh–Durham International Airport's international and domestic terminals.

=== Environment-related works ===
In the latter 2000s, Driscoll focused on environmental issues In a series of labor-intensive projects primarily made from found and repurposed, petroleum-based plastic jugs and drink containers (e.g., Phantom Limb, Wave Hill, 2007). These cautionary works spanned 19th-century industry and 21st-century global upheavals involving development and resource exploitation, critiquing contemporary culture's over-dependence on fossil fuels, rampant consumption, geopolitical imbalance and economic volatility. They included drawings and unwieldy, ghostly landscapes of miniature vernacular structures (bridges, mills, oil rigs and refineries, dredging cranes), McMansions, abandoned shacks, and abstracted landmasses that employed disorienting shifts of scale and perspective. Patricia Phillips described the eerie, transparent 28-foot landscape, FastForwardFossil (2009–10, Smack Mellon), as "a restless pursuit of meaning in the complex cartography of resources, technology, consumption, and waste across three centuries in global locations." The installations Still Life (2010) and Distant Mirrors (2011) explored similar themes with tethered landmasses and structures that floated on actual bodies of water. The latter work was set on the Providence River, with elements shifting, rearranging, collecting debris, and evolving (historically, from the city's 17th-century utopian blueprint to current day) during the exhibition in dialogue with the flowing river.

Ellen Driscoll, Untitled 3, walnut and sumi ink on paper, 59" x 82", 2015.

With later projects, Driscoll extended her interests to the resilience of the natural world in the face of sociopolitical threat. The sumi and walnut ink drawings in her "Soundings" (2015) and "Thicket" (2017) exhibitions blended ochre, umber and coffee-colored silhouettes and spectral imagery of ivy skeins, volunteer plants, birds, clothing, skeletal billboards, abandoned loading docks and honeycombed structures into liminal topographies of land and water, culture and nature, ruin and rebirth. "Soundings" offered an immersive, composite past-present portrait of Red Hook, Brooklyn that critic Lilly Wei described as mundane and fluid, shifting from abstraction and dissolution to sharp realistic focus in an exploration of adaptability, transition, transformation and ephemerality. "Thicket" included soft sculptures partially attached to walls—some printed with tangled tree imagery—that suggested clothing patterns and city plans or topographical maps cut into cloth (e.g., Stilt, 2014).

== Awards and public collections ==
Driscoll has been recognized by fellowships from the Guggenheim Foundation, Harvard Radcliffe Institute, Anonymous Was a Woman, National Endowment for the Arts, New York Foundation for the Arts, Massachusetts Cultural Council, Siena Arts Institute, Brown Foundation/Dora Maar House, and Artists Foundation. She has received awards and grants from the LEF Foundation, American Academy of Arts and Letters and International Sculpture Center, and residencies from the Banff Centre for the Arts, Bogliasco Foundation, MacDowell, Pilchuck Glass School, Rockefeller Foundation (Bellagio, Italy) and Sirius Art Centre (Ireland), among others.

Driscoll's work belongs to the public collections of the Addison Gallery of American Art, Boston Public Library, Detroit Institute of Arts, Fralin Museum of Art, Harvard Art Museums, Hood Museum of Art, Metropolitan Museum of Art, Rose Art Museum, Smith College Museum of Art, and Whitney Museum, among others.
