= Earl W. Brydges Artpark State Park =

State park in Niagara County, New York

- Location within New York
- Type: State park
- Location: 450 South 4th Street; Lewiston, New York
- Nearest city: Lewiston, New York
- Coordinates: 43°09′50″N 79°02′35″W
- Area: 108 acres (0.44 km^{2})
- Created: 1974
- Operator: New York State Office of Parks, Recreation and Historic Preservation
- Visitors: 301,523 (in 2014)
- Open: All year
- Website: Earl W. Brydges Artpark State Park

Earl W. Brydges Artpark State Park (or Earl W. Brydges State Artpark) is a 108-acre (0.44 km^{2}) state park located in the Village of Lewiston in Niagara County, New York. The park, which is officially named after former New York State Senator Earl Brydges, is generally referred to as Artpark.

The Earl W. Brydges Artpark programs are managed by Artpark & Company, Inc for the New York State Office of Parks, Recreation and Historical Preservation under a Cooperative Agreement. Artpark & Company is a not-for-profit 501c3 Arts and Education organization which serves the people of Western New York and Southern Ontario.

Today Artpark programming attracts over 150,000 audiences over the course of its summer season (June-August) and serves a population of approximately 1.2 million Western New Yorkers and over 1 million Canadian residents. Over the course of its 50-year history, over 2.5 million persons have attended musical and theater performances at Artpark.

The park overlooks the Niagara Gorge.

The park is 1 of 80 New York State Parks that were in the path of totality for the 2024 solar eclipse, with the park experiencing 3 minutes and 25 seconds of totality.

== Park description ==
The park is a venue for summer musical entertainment, in addition to offering picnic tables and pavilions, fishing, hiking, nature trail, a performing arts theater, recreation programs. Also located on the property is the Lewiston Mound, an archaeological site on the National Register of Historic Places.

== Land art ==
Artpark was founded in 1974, one year after Robert Smithson's death, and had an artist's residency program in his honor. The park, created on the site of a former industrial waste dump, became an important site for works of the land art movement. It was the site of Alan Sonfist's Pool of Virgin Earth, a 25-foot-diameter (7.6 m) clay basin for catching aerial seeds, and projects by several women artists in the 1970s, including Michelle Stuart, Alice Adams and Agnes Denes and Nancy Holt. It continued to be an important laboratory for outdoor sculpture, with over 200 artists and collectives creating art and installations at the site between 1974 and 1984.

=== Selected visual art at Artpark ===
Installations at Artpark were intended to be temporary. Works created at the park included:

- Hydra's Head, Nancy Holt, 1974
- Bingo, Gordon Matta-Clark, 1974 (also at nearby Love Canal)
- Pool of Virgin Earth, Alan Sonfist, 1975
- Niagara Gorge Relocated, Michelle Stuart, 1975
- Artpark Installation, Dale Chihuly and Seaver Leslie, 1975
- Rice/Tree/Burial, Agnes Denes, 1977 (re-creation)
- The Beginnings of a Complex..., Excerpt Shaft #4/ Five Walls, Alice Aycock, 1977
- Shorings, Alice Adams, 1978
- Art Park Spoils Pile Reclamation, Helen Harrison, Newton Harrison, Joshua Harrison, 1976-1978. A three-year project sponsored by the New York State Commission for Arts, National Endowment for the Arts, and the National Heritage Trust.
- Omega, Owen Morrel, 1980
- Merlin's Canopy and Mirror-Fence for Joanne, Merle Temkin, 1981
- Newton Discovering Gravity, Dennis Oppenheim, 1984

== Performance venues ==
The facility features an Amphitheater venue, a Mainstage venue, and gathering, vending, and services areas. The Amphitheater consists of an outdoor stage with seating for up to 10,000 viewers in the front-of-stage viewing area, tiered lawn sections for general seating and reserved seating, and a fabric-covered terrace for sponsored seating. The Mainstage consists of an enclosed performance stage with fly house, orchestra pit, and back of house service areas, reserved seating sections accommodating up to 2400 viewers, outdoor terrace and balcony areas for gatherings and events. The enclosure is opened along the back wall to a lawn area used for general seating for up to 2000 viewers. The Amphitheater holds musical performance on a weekly basis throughout the performance season. The Mainstage presents a number of musical and theatrical performances, presentations, school graduations, and other events during the performance season. In 2017, Artpark was qualified for the Empire State Musical & Theatrical Tax Credit Program and in 2020 as the Qualified Film Production Facility accreditation by the Office of Motion Picture & Television Development.

== See also ==
- List of New York state parks
- List of contemporary amphitheatres
