= Woodlawn station (Charlotte) =

Light rail station in Charlotte, North Carolina

Woodlawn
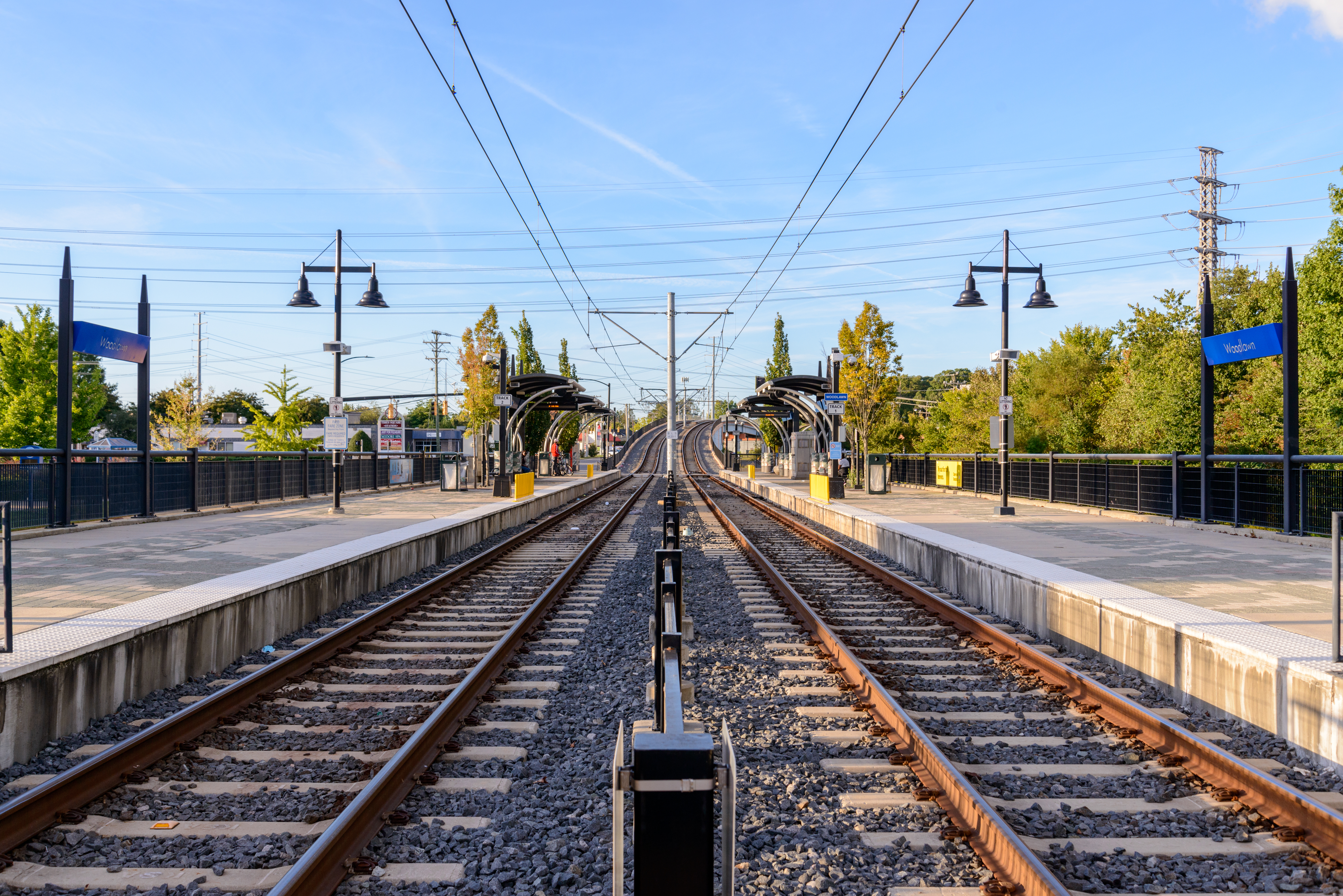

General information
- Location: 4756 Old Pineville Road; Charlotte, North Carolina; United States
- Coordinates: 35°10′33″N 80°52′45″W
- Owner: Charlotte Area Transit System
- Platforms: 2 side platforms
- Tracks: 2
- Bus stands: 3
- Connections: CATS: 24

Construction
- Structure type: At-grade
- Parking: 382 spaces
- Cycle facilities: Bicycle racks
- Accessible: yes
- Architect: Ralph Whitehead Associates
- Architectural style: Postmodern

History
- Opened: November 24, 2007

Services
Preceding station	CATS	Following station
Tyvola toward I-485/South Boulevard	Lynx Blue Line	Scaleybark toward UNC Charlotte–Main
Location

Woodlawn is a light rail station in Charlotte, North Carolina. The at-grade dual side platforms are a stop along the Lynx Blue Line and serves an area of mostly commercial and industrial businesses, with the neighborhoods of Collingwood and Madison Park located nearby. It also features a 382-space park and ride and local bus connections.

== Location ==
The station and the park and ride are both located along Old Pineville Road, a 1,000 feet (300 m) south from the Woodlawn Road interchange. Next to the station are two small strip malls: Time Square Station and Woodlawn Plaza. Woodlawn Marketplace, a much larger strip mall that include Burlington, Home Depot, and TJ Maxx, is adjacent to the station, but can only be accessed via Woodlawn Road.

== History ==
The station was part of the overall planning and construction of the LYNX Blue Line; starting in 1999, it was approved in February 2000 and construction began on February 26, 2005. From May 10 through May 30, 2006, the Woodlawn Viaduct was constructed; located north of the station, it spans a distance of 0.25 miles (400 m), crossing 40 feet (12 m) above Woodlawn Road.

The station officially opened for service on Saturday, November 24, 2007, and as part of its opening celebration fares were not collected. Regular service with fare collection began on Monday, November 26, 2007. By 2017, the side platforms were lengthened to allow three-car trains at the station.

== Station layout ==
The station consists of two side platforms and six covered waiting areas; other amenities include ticket vending machines, emergency call box, and bicycle racks. The station also features several art installations including a drinking fountain basin designed to look like dogwood, the North Carolina state flower, by Nancy Blum. Bas-reliefs entitled Hornbeam, by Alice Adams. Leaf motifs on both the pavers and shelters, by Leticia Huerta. River stone benches, by Hoss Haley, and track fencing with white oak leaves, by Shaun Cassidy.

Adjacent to the station is the park and ride, which features a 382-space surface parking lot and three bus bays. Separate entrance and exit are both located on Old Pineville Road; parking is free for patrons for either bus or light rail and is limited to 24 hours.
