= Guadalupe Maravilla =

Salvadoran-American drawing artist

Guadalupe Maravilla (born 1976) is a transdisciplinary visual artist, choreographer, and healer. At the age of eight, Maravilla was part of the first wave of unaccompanied children to arrive at the United States border in the 1980s as a result of the Salvadoran Civil War. In 2016, Maravilla became a U.S. citizen and adopted the name Guadalupe Maravilla. As an acknowledgment to his past, Maravilla grounds his practice in the historical and contemporary contexts belonging to undocumented communities and the cancer community. Maravilla's studio is located in Brooklyn, New York.

== Early life ==
Maravilla was born in El Salvador in 1976. He often played on the steps of the pyramids in El Salvador and spent his early childhood drawing and creating sculptures.

In 1984 (at the age of eight), Maravilla crossed the border into Texas alone escorted by a Coyote, becoming part of the first wave of unaccompanied minors, undocumented children to arrive at the United States border in the 1980s as a result of the Salvadoran Civil War. Maravilla and his family later arrived in New York City where he started attending art school and exploring different aspects of New York culture, like hip-hop.

In 2016, Maravilla became a U.S. citizen and adopted the name Guadalupe Maravilla in solidarity with his father. With regards to his first name, his mother, who died with cancer in 2007, told him how she initially wanted to name him Guadalupe, since he was born on the same day as the Virgin of Guadalupe. However, she didn't because his father wanted him to have a more masculine name. As an acknowledgement of his own migratory past, Maravilla grounds his practice in the historical and contemporary contexts of immigrant culture, particularly those belonging to Latin communities.

== Education ==
Maravilla was the first in his family to go to college. He earned his Bachelors of Fine Arts degree from the School of Visual Arts in New York in 2003. He earned his Master of Fine Arts degree from Hunter College in New York in 2013.

== Art ==
Combining pre-colonial Central American ancestry, personal mythology, and collaborative performative acts, Maravilla’s performances, objects, and drawings trace the history of his own displacement and that of others. Culling the entangled fictional and autobiographical genealogies of border crossing accounts, Maravilla nurtures collective narratives of trauma into celebrations of perseverance and humanity. Across all media, Maravilla explores how the systemic abuse of immigrants physically manifests in the body, reflecting on his own battle with cancer, which began in his gut. Maravilla’s large-scale sculptures, titled Disease Throwers, function as headdresses, instruments, and shrines through the incorporation of materials collected from sites across Central America, anatomical models, and sonic instruments such as conch shells and gongs. Disease Throwers ultimately serve as symbols of renewal, generating therapeutic, vibrational sound.

Maravilla's practice combines indigenous traditions with urban culture. He often makes sculptural headdresses that mimic pre-Columbian dress, which serve as costumes in his performances. In 2011, Maravilla performed Crossing Performance at the Mexico-United States border. Maravilla wore a tall, spiky headdress fusing Mayan and futuristic imagery while swimming across the Rio Grande. The headdress contained a large solar reflector that reflected the sun's light, drawing the attention of Border Patrol agents. To

Maravilla's work is largely inspired by his childhood experience of emigrating to the United States. In 2016, he changed his name to Guadalupe Maravilla. The el coyote—or border-crossing agent—is featured in his overall work. The sculptural work Border Crossing Headdress is Maravilla's interpretation of the coyote, made using soil from the American-Mexican border region.

Maravilla has staged multiple large-scale performances incorporating hip-hop, theater, sculpture, sound, video, and photography. His performance BOOM! BOOM! WHAMMM! SWOOSH!(2017) consisted of him directing a feminist motorcycle gang inside the Texas State Capitol parking garage. Maravilla conducted over thirty immigrant performers. The participants included quinceñeras, Tibetan throat singers, and immigrants with disabilities.

In 2018, Maravilla collaborated with undocumented immigrants to create 10 drawings alongside a 42 ft mural. Participants drew onto digital manipulations of the Historia Tolteca-Chichimeca (c. 1550), a colonial Mexican manuscript that combines Nahua pictorial writing with European conventions of the historical annal. The lines are drawn based a Salvadoran game called Tripa Chuca, in which participants draw lines connecting pairs of matching numbers distributed across the page without crossing over previously drawn paths.

In 2019 Maravilla began the series, Disease Throwers, free-standing mixed-media sculptures that reflect the various indigenous healing practices that the artist explored during a long bout with cancer. These sculptures incorporate gongs and can be activated by performers to create sound baths, a healing therapy Maravilla staged for groups during 2020 exhibitions at PPOW gallery and Socrates Sculpture Park.

In 2026, Maravilla was invited to be a part of 61st edition of the Venice Biennale by the late curator Koyo Kouoh.

=== Collections ===
Maravilla's work has entered the permanent collections of many museums. These include the Museum of Modern Art, New York; the Whitney Museum of American Art, New York; Museo Nacional Centro de Arte Reina Sofía, Madrid; and the Institute of Contemporary Art, Miami.

=== Solo exhibitions ===
- Guadalupe Maravilla: Tierra Blanca Joven, Brooklyn Museum of Art, Brooklyn, NY (2022)
- Guadalupe Maravilla: Luz y Fuerza, Museum of Modern Art, New York (2021)
- Planeta Abuelx, Socrates Sculpture Park, Queens, NY (2021)
- Seven Ancestral Stomachs, PPOW, New York, NY (2021)
- Spirit Level, Creative Time, NY (Postponed)(2020)
- Disease Thrower, Knockdown Center, Performance (Canceled)(2020)
- Walk on Water performance, Queens Museum, Queens, NY (2019)
- Disease Thrower, ICA Museum, Richmond, Virginia (2019)
- Portals, ICA Museum, Miami (2019)
- Saga, Jack Barrett Gallery, New York (2019)
- OG of the Undocumented Children Performance, Whitney Museum of American Art(2018)
- BOOM BOOM WHAMM SWOOSH performance, Fusebox Festival, Houston, Texas (2017)
- XOLO Yawning, Y Gallery, New York, NY (2015)
- Temple, DCKT Gallery, New York, NY (2011)
- Return Of Xipe Totec, Jack the Pelican presents, Brooklyn, NY (2008)
- The Neighbors, part three: Love Thy Neighbor, Bronx Museum of the Arts, Bronx (2017)
- Xolo Yawning, Y Gallery, New York (2016)
- Temple of the Bearded Man, DCKT Contemporary, New York (2011)

=== Performances ===
Maravilla has performed in many venues including the Whitney Museum of American Art, New York; the Museum of Modern Art, New York; the Metropolitan Museum of Art, New York; the Institute of Contemporary Art, Miami; Queens Museum, New York; The Bronx Museum of the Arts, New York; El Museo del Barrio, New York; Museum of Art of El Salvador, San Salvador; X Central American Biennial, Costa Rica; New York;, Shelley & Donald Rubin Foundation, New York; and the Drawing Center, New York, among others.

=== Group exhibitions/performances ===
- Several Eternities In A Day: Form In The Age Of Living Materials, Hammer Museum, Los Angeles, CA (2026)
- Pacha, Llaqta, Wasichay: Indigenous Space, Modern Architecture, New Art, Whitney Museum of American Art, New York, NY (2018)
- FIRST WE TAKE MANHATTAN, Ethan Cohen New York, NY (2016)
- The Magus Performance, Metropolitan Museum of Art, NY (2014)
- 10, an exhibition celebrating MARTE Contemporary's 10 year anniversary, Museo de Arte de El Salvador (MARTE) and MARTE Contemporary (MARTE-C), San Salvador (2014)
- Tandem in Pursuits: Armor & Ichthyology, Bronx, NY (2012)
- 9th Annual BRONX RIVER Sights & SOUNDS Festival, Bronx River Art Center, Bronx, NY (2012)
- Performa 11, The Dating Game, El Museo Del Barrio, NY (2011)
- I Didn't Cross the Border, the Border Crossed Me, Museum of Contemporary Native Arts, Santa Fe, NM (2010)
- Hair Tactics, Jersey City Museum, Jersey City, NJ (2010)

== Prizes and awards ==
Maravilla has won many prizes for his art. The 2021 Joan Mitchell Fellowship, the Lise Wilhelmsen Art award 2021, Guggenheim Foundation Fellowship (2019), LatinX Fellowship (a joint prize from the Ford Foundation and Mellon Foundation) (2021), Soros Fellowship: Art Migration and Public Space (2019), Map fund (2019), Creative Capital Grant (2016), Franklin Furnace (2018), Joan Mitchell Emerging Artist Grant (2016), Art Matters Grant (2013), Art Matters Fellowship (2017), Virginia Museum of Fine Arts Fellowship (2018), Dedalus Foundation Grant (2013), Robert Mapplethorpe Foundation Award (2003).

- Joan Mitchell Fellowship (2021)
- Lise Wilhelmsen Art award (2021)
- LatinX Fellowship (2021)
- Guggenheim Memorial Foundation Fellowship (2019)
- Map Fund Grant (2019)
- Soros Art Fellowship; Art, Migration & Public Space (2019)
- Franklin Furnace (2018)
- Art Matters Fellowship (2017)
- Virginia Museum of Fine Arts Fellowship (2017)
- Latinx Artist Fellowship (2021)
- Creative Capital Emerging Fields Award (2016)
- Virginia Commonwealth University Fountainhead Fellowship (2014)
- Dedalus Foundation Fellowship (2013)
- Art Matters Grant (2012)
- Cisneros Foundation Grant (2012)
- Robert Mapplethorpe Award, Robert Mapplethorpe Foundation (2003)
