= Jennifer McGregor =

Jennifer McGregor may refer to:

- Jennifer McGregor (curator)
- Jennifer McGregor (soprano)
