= Scaleybark station =

Light rail station in Charlotte, North Carolina

Scaleybark
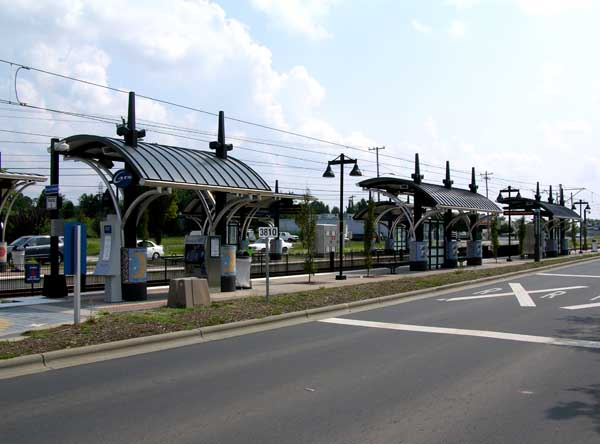
- Western side from across South Boulevard

General information
- Location: 3750 South Boulevard; Charlotte, North Carolina
- Coordinates: 35°11′27″N 80°52′30″W
- Owner: Charlotte Area Transit System
- Platforms: 2 side platforms
- Tracks: 2
- Bus stands: 2
- Connections: CATS: 12, 30

Construction
- Structure type: At-grade
- Cycle facilities: Bicycle racks
- Accessible: yes
- Architect: Ralph Whitehead Associates
- Architectural style: Postmodern

History
- Opened: November 24, 2007

Services
Preceding station	CATS	Following station
Woodlawn toward I-485/South Boulevard	Lynx Blue Line	New Bern toward UNC Charlotte–Main
Location

Scaleybark is a light rail station in Charlotte, North Carolina. The at-grade dual side platforms are a stop along the Lynx Blue Line that serves the nearby neighborhoods of Colonial Village, Collingwood, and York Road.

== Location ==
The station is located in the median of South Boulevard at Whitton Street and is accessible by pedestrian crossing at intersection. The immediate area is currently in the midst of a redevelopment, spearheaded by Beacon Partners; which will transform the area into a 15-acre (6.1 ha) mixed-use development called LoSo Station. Nearby, several breweries and distilleries are located in the area.

=== Artwork ===
Furrow, completed in 2007, was created by Raleigh artist Thomas Sayre, are six disks each are 18 feet (5.5 m) in height and weigh in at 11 tons each. Commissioned by the Charlotte Area Transit System (CATS), as part of the CATS Art in Transit program, the shapes of the sculpture resembles that of a plow's disk harrows, and are located at the ends of the median approaching the platform. The materials utilized in the creation of the disks included 72 cubic yards of dirt excavated from the site of the I-485/South Boulevard station. The dirt was mixed with concrete tinted with iron oxide and applied to the steel discs in the Scaleybark parking lot. Each disc measures only 9 inches (230 mm) in width, and have been engineered to withstand hurricane-force winds. Originally, Sayre's vision called for a 30 feet (9.1 m) disk near Clanton Road and three additional disks, ranging between 12 feet (3.7 m) to 16 feet (4.9 m) in height at Scaleybark.

A canceled public art project for Scaleybark called for the restoration of the neighboring Queens Park Theater tower sign. To be created by New York City artist R.M. Fisher, the restored landmark was to have featured lighted panels at the base with backlighted paintings of long leaf pines, the North Carolina state tree. The project was eliminated in January 2005 due to escalating overall costs for the project as a whole.

== History ==
The station officially opened for service on Saturday, November 24, 2007, and as part of its opening celebration fares were not collected. Regular service with fare collection commenced on Monday, November 26, 2007. Although it is named the Scaleybark station, it is actually located opposite Scaleybark Road across South Boulevard at its intersection with Old Pineville Road in a 70 feet (21 m) wide median. It has side platforms, which sit on either side of the tracks, and a 315-space park and ride to the west across South Boulevard.

In 2019, the park and ride was temporarily relocated to a new location along Dewitt Lane, while the former lot location along Whitton Street was redeveloped as part of the LoSo Station mixed-use development. Beacon Partners, which is leading the 15-acre (6.1 ha) project, says that the park and ride will eventually be reincorporated. The three bus stands along Whitton Street were also relocated and reduced to two bus stands along southbound South Boulevard, catercorner to the station at Whitton Street. In April 2022, the agreement between Beacon Partners and CATS regarding the park and ride officially ended and was closed to commuters, with the temporary lot to be developed.

=== Incidents and accidents ===
- November 11, 2007: A man was struck by a train during the LYNX testing phase near the junction of Old Pineville Road and South Boulevard, just south of the Scaleybark station. The incident marked the first fatality involving a LYNX train and a pedestrian.
- July 10, 2009: The Charlotte Flash Mob group boarded the 7:33 train headed to I-485 at this station and blew bubbles until exiting at the next stop, Woodlawn Station. Over 40 people attended and it received coverage, both online and print, in the next day's Charlotte Observer.

== Station layout ==
The station consists of two side platforms and six covered waiting areas; other amenities include ticket vending machines, emergency call box, and bicycle racks. The station also features several art installations including Bas-reliefs entitled Hornbeam, by Alice Adams. Mexican Bingo motifs on both the pavers and shelters, by Leticia Huerta; and track fencing with sweetgum leaves, by Shaun Cassidy.

Two bus stands are located along southbound South boulevard, catercorner to the station at Whitton Street.

Side platform, doors will open on the right
Southbound	← Lynx Blue Line toward I-485/South Boulevard (Woodlawn)
Northbound	Lynx Blue Line toward UNC Charlotte–Main (New Bern) →
Side platform, doors will open on the right
