= Wheatfield — A Confrontation =

1982 artwork by Agnes Denes

- Denes walking through the field
- Artist: Agnes Denes
- Year: 1982
- Type: Installation
- Dimensions: 99 m × 91 m (325 ft × 300 ft)
- Location: Battery Park City, New York City; 40.703326°N 74.017178°W

Wheatfield — A Confrontation is a 1982 artwork by conceptual artist Agnes Denes. The work, a 2.2-acre field of wheat, was grown on the empty Battery Park City landfill in Manhattan, next to the World Trade Center, for four months from 1 May to 16 August 1982. Described by Denes as "an intrusion of the country into the metropolis, the world's richest real estate", it is regarded as her best-known work.

== Background ==
At the time, the area upon which the artwork was to be created, 2.2 acres upon a landfill in Battery Park, Manhattan, was considered to have an economic potential of $4.5 billion. The landfill had been created when the nearby World Trade Center was built. As a result of this rubble, the land was largely infertile to begin with.

Initially, Denes was invited to create a public sculpture in New York; she has said that she "decided we had enough public sculptures, enough men sitting on horses," and thus rejected this proposal.

== Installation ==
=== Commission and planting ===
Wheatfield — A Confrontation was commissioned by the New York City's Public Art Fund, as the second commission of "The Urban Environmental Site Program" series it had created to draw attention to empty spaces along the waterfront of New York.

200 truckloads of soil were used to cover two inches, and 285 hand-furrowed rows of traditional wheat from North Dakota were planted on 1 May 1982, using a tractor.

=== Upkeep, harvest and distribution ===
Denes, two assistants, and rotating volunteers maintained the field for four months, with Denes living near the artwork for its duration, "seven days a week". Around six weeks after the planting, the seeds started sprouting. They set up an irrigation system, weeded, fertilized, and cleared the plants of wheat smut, a fungus that had been encouraged by the rain. The wheat eventually grew to waist height.

The wheat was placed under stress by the mildew and other factors, with the result that it headed too early and needed to be harvested a month earlier than initially planned. Denes and others harvested the wheat, which equated to around 1000 pounds of grains, on 16 August 1982, four months after the seeds were first planted. Denes has described this harvest as "an incredible feeling."

The straw from the harvest went to the New York City Police Department's mounted police in Manhattan to feed their horses. The grain went to 28 different cities around the world in a travelling exhibition named The International Art Show for the End of World Hunger from 1987 until 1990, which gave out the seeds for people to plant. The first of these museums was the Minnesota Museum of American Art. This ensured that the entire crop was used.

== Message and purpose ==
Wheatfield — A Confrontation was intended to protest global warming and economic inequality, critiquing the misplaced priorities of modern society. She described it at the time as "an intrusion of the country into the metropolis, the world's richest real estate." The wheatfield was chosen to represent food, energy, commerce, world trade, and economics, while also referring to mismanagement, waste, and world hunger. It additionally highlights the paradoxes between urban and rural worlds. On the Today show at the time, Denes said she "wanted to make a powerful statement for a powerful city." She wanted people to participate in the work and for this to create feeling.

Denes has since said of the artwork that:

"My decision to plant a wheatfield in Manhattan, instead of designing just another public sculpture, grew out of the longstanding concern and need to call attention to our misplaced priorities and deteriorating human values. Manhattan is the richest, most professional, most congested and, without a doubt, most fascinating island in the world. To attempt to plant, sustain and harvest two acres of wheat here, wasting valuable real estate and obstructing the ‘machinery’ by going against the system, was an effrontery that made it the powerful paradox I had sought for the calling to account."

Denes continues to believe the meanings of the work, and has stated 40 years after the original work that "the issues have not been resolved," and that "there is still world hunger, mismanagement of resources, mismanagement and misuse of our spaces and environments.”

== Photographs ==
A number of photographs were taken of the artwork. In one photograph, Denes tends to the wheat in a striped shirt and blue jeans, contrasting Wall Street's skyscrapers in the background, whereas in another the Statue of Liberty can be seen in the distance, and in another the wheat can be seen in the shadow of the World Trade Center.

== Reception ==
The work has been referred to as Denes' best known, and is often described as "prophetic".

Wall Street did not initially welcome the project, though Denes has said that "people from all the office buildings came down to visit us and they prayed for gentle rain, it became their field." New York Times critic Holland Cotter wrote in response to the artwork that "Kansas had landed in Manhattan!" Curator Joyce Pomeroy Schwartz said that "It felt like a farm… like smelling the outdoors". Ships coming toward the Hudson River regularly sounded their horns to salute the field.

Curator Emma Enderby described the photographs as "profound and surreal and universal." The Guardian stated in 2022 that "it would now be impossible for a wheatfield on this scale to be installed in most cities around the world – especially New York, where land is even more expensive". In 2021 Amelia Rina of The Brooklyn Rail described the work as a "missed opportunity", stating that Denes "unintentionally reinforced capitalist ventures" with the work by disregarding the "violent theft" of the land from the original Munsee Lenape inhabitants, and by producing a monoculture. However, the land on which the work was exhibited was made from landfill and did not exist prior to European colonization.

== Reprises and exhibitions ==
The work was reprised in Dalston, East London, in 2009, and in Milan, Italy, in 2015.

The photographs, as well as vintage videos of the work, were placed on display at the Shed in New York City, as part of its 2019–2020 exhibition Agnes Denes: Absolutes and Intermediates. This was Denes' first ever retrospective.

At the 2024 edition of Art Basel in Switzerland, another field was sowed as an homage to Wheatfield, titled Honouring Wheatfield – A Confrontation. It takes up over 1,000 square meters of the concrete plaza in Basel with hundreds of moveable palettes of wheat. Also in 2024, Denes planted Wheatfield – An Inspiration in Bozeman, Montana, hosted by art project Tinworks. She stated that "this Wheatfield is a totally different idea — to bring people together," and as such worked with residents, students and small businesses to plant and care for the wheat. 50 volunteers showed up to clear the site for the crop in fall 2024. It was planned to be harvested by Montana State University’s plant sciences department that summer, at which point local bakeries would use it to stock regional food banks.

== See also ==
- Environmental art
- Intervention art
