= Virginia Overton =

American sculptor

- Born: 1971 (age 53–54); Nashville, Tennessee, US
- Known for: Installation, sculpture

Virginia Overton (born 1971) is an American artist. She is known for her site-specific and sculpture works that often incorporate found or readymade objects. In 2018 she was the first female artist to have a solo exhibition at the Socrates Sculpture Park in Long Island City, Queens, New York.

== Early life and education ==
Overton was born in Nashville, Tennessee, in 1971. Overton has said that, although her mother was a painter, it was her father who started her interest in sculpting. Although she tried other jobs, Overton acknowledged that she wanted to become an artist because she felt it was important to find a career that contributed to society. After leaving Tennessee, Overton worked in New Mexico and North Carolina in various teaching jobs. She eventually earned her Masters of Fine Arts and Bachelor of Fine Arts from the University of Memphis before moving to New York. While in New York, Overton collaborated with various artists in a shared studio. Virginia Overton is represented by Bortolami and White Cube.

== Exhibitions ==
In 2014 Overton had her first solo museum exhibit in the United States, at the Museum of Contemporary Art, North Miami.

In 2015, Overton collaborated with her former professor Greely Myatt from the University of Memphis on an exhibit titled "Street Trash". In 2016, Overton and other artists participated in the Tribeca Film Festival Artists Awards Program. She created an original work to be given to the winning filmmakers as decided by the Tribeca Film Festival jury.

In 2018, Overton became the first female artist to have a solo exhibition at the Socrates Sculpture Park in Long Island City, Queens with her site-specific sculpture exhibit "Built". Her exhibit "Built" used construction materials such as steel and wood to rethink raw material and "explore issues of labor, economics, and the land in contemporary society."

== Collections ==
Overton's work is included in the collections of the Whitney Museum of American Art, which holds eleven of her pieces, and in the Museum of Modern Art, New York.
