= Michelle Stuart =

American multidisciplinary artist (born 1933)

- Born: 1933 (age 92–93)
- Education: Chouinard Art Institute
- Awards: Guggenheim Fellowship (1975), NEA Grants (1975, 1977, 1980, 1989)

Michelle Stuart (born 1933) is an American multidisciplinary artist known for her sculpture, painting and environmental art. She is based in New York City.

== Early life ==
Stuart was born in 1933 and she grew up in Los Angeles, California. Adventurers, explorers, and artists were present on both sides of her family tree. According to the Smithsonian's oral history interview with Stuart in the Archives of American Art, Stuart's mother grew up in an upper-middle-class family in Switzerland: her maternal grandfather was an engineer, and her maternal grandmother had a lace-making business. Tragically, Stuart's maternal grandmother died when her mother was just 16. Around that time, her maternal grandfather, well aware of the imminent German threat in Europe after WWI, led his extended family to leave Switzerland. The family moved to Sydney, Australia, a place the grandfather had been enamored of in his world-wide travels and where he had relatives.

It was here in Sydney that Stuart's parents met and fell in love. Her father, who was 20 years older than her mother, ran a plumbing supplies import-export business for which he had travelled extensively. The couple married in Sydney, and with a baby on the way, the couple moved to the burgeoning city of Los Angeles, where Stuart was born.

As an only child, Stuart was close with both of her parents. Her father's business had succumbed at the height of the Great Depression, but he was able to secure work using his engineer working skills on efforts of the Boulder Dam, later named the Hoover Dam.

After attending Chouinard Art Institute (now the California Institute of the Arts), Stuart worked as a topological draftsperson. She worked in Mexico about 1951 as a studio assistant to Diego Rivera. She married Catalan artist José Bartoli in 1953. She lived for 3 years in Paris, then moved to New York, where she has resided since 1957.

== Work ==
Passages: Mesa Verde (1977-1979) at the Hirshhorn Museum and Sculpture Garden in 2022

In the early phase of her career, Stuart drew inspiration from recently released photographs of the surface of the Moon and saw parallels between her early rubbings and these lunar landscapes. This body of luminous monochromatic drawings brought land art into the gallery. During this time, Stuart investigated other means of addressing specific sites through her landworks or, as she terms them, "drawings in the landscape". In Niagara Gorge Path Relocated (1975), the artist situated a 460-foot scroll of paper cascading down a large bank of the Niagara River Gorge at Art Park.

Throughout her career her art has figured in reviews of the work of women artists.

In the 1980s, Stuart shifted her focus. She embarked on a series of gridded paintings that introduced beeswax, seashells, blossoms, leaves and sand embedded in an encaustic surface. Stuart also created complex multi-media installations involving light and sound elements.

Her series titled Extinct (1993) was inspired by a Victorian-era album of leaves. For one work in the series, she revisited the grid formation, but this time placed a variety of dried plants within each compartment. During this time, Stuart also created the Seed Calendar drawings, which employ the grid to map the maturation stages of a seed.

Throughout her career, Stuart has also sought to manifest her love of literature and the writing process through a variety of strategies. In the early 70s, she began to create the Rock Book series, artworks that in their use of natural materials from specific sites might be considered alternative travel logs. These works take the form of tattered, bound journals made of earth rubbings. For example, in Homage to the Owl from Four Corners (1985), earth, owl feathers, string and beeswax are brought together to form a book.

Stuart has published artists' books, including The Fall (1976), a book-length prose poem about keeping historical records and Butterflies and Moths (2006).

Stuart currently lives and works in New York City and Amagansett, Long Island.

== Exhibitions ==
Michelle Stuart has exhibited in Europe, Asia and the United States for more than thirty years. Selected exhibitions include: the Museum of Modern Art, New York; the Museum of Contemporary Art, Los Angeles; the Hirshhorn Museum and Sculpture Garden, Washington, D.C.; the San Francisco Museum of Modern Art; the Wadsworth Atheneum, Hartford; the Art Museum of the Ateneum, Helsinki, Finland; the Musée d’Arts de Toulon, France; the American Academy of Arts & Letters; Kunsthalle, Hamburg, Germany; and the National Museum of Modern Art, Kyoto, Japan.

She has had one-person exhibits at the Walker Art Center, Minneapolis; Massachusetts Institute of Technology, Cambridge, MA; The Rose Art Museum, Waltham, MA; the Gemeentemuseum Den Haag, Netherlands; the Institute of Contemporary Arts, London; Williams College Museum of Art, Williamstown, MA; Centre d’Arts Plastique Contemporaines de Bourdeaux, France; The Arts Club of Chicago; Everson Museum of Art, Syracuse, NY; Galerie Ueda and Ueda Warehouse Tokyo, Japan and individual galleries in both the United States and Europe. In 2013, Stuart was the subject of a retrospective that focused on her drawing. It was organized by the Djanogly Art Gallery, University of Nottingham, UK, and travelled to the Santa Barbara Museum of Art, Santa Barbara, CA and the Parrish Art Museum, Watermill, NY.

In 2008 Stuart was part of a group exhibition called "Decoys, Complexes and Triggers: Feminism and Land Art in the 1970s," at the SculptureCenter in Long Island City, New York other artists in this exhibit included Alice Adams, Alice Aycock, Lynda Benglis, Agnes Denes, Jackie Ferrara, Suzanne Harris, Nancy Holt, Mary Miss, and Jackie Winsor.

Stuart's works were featured in Documenta VI, Kassel, Germany and in the American Biennial Pavilions in Seoul, Korea, and Cairo, Egypt.

Among her commissions are the grand lobby installation: Paradisi: A Garden Mural, at the Brooklyn Museum. Site sculptures include Starmarker and Star Chart: Constellations, in Wanas Sculpture Garden, Knislinge, Sweden; Garden of Four Seasons, Scheide Music Center, Wooster, Ohio; Garden of Four Seasons, a bronze/marble sculpture relief in Tochige, Japan and Tabula, a thirty-four-part marble relief at the New Stuyvesant High School in Battery Park, New York City, for which she won a New York City Art Commission Award for Design.

== Notable works in public collections ==
- Seeded Site (1969-1970), Tate, London
- Zena (Vertical), NY (1972), Art Institute of Chicago
- #7 Echo (1973), Menil Collection, Houston
- #38 Moray Hill (1973), Menil Collection, Houston
- #1 Woodstock, NY (1973), Tate, London
- #4 Woodstock (1973), Allen Memorial Art Museum, Oberlin, Ohio
- #28 Moray Hill (1974), Whitney Museum, New York
- Turtle Pond (1974), Museum of Contemporary Art, Chicago
- Turtle Pond Site Drawing #36 (1974), Museum of Contemporary Art, Chicago
- Notes: Sayreville, N.J. (1975), National Gallery of Australia, Canberra
- Spiral Notebook (1975), San Francisco Museum of Modern Art
- Suite Tsikomo (1975), National Gallery of Art, Washington, D.C.; and Philadelphia Museum of Art
- Breezy Point, New York (1976), National Gallery of Australia, Canberra
- Fossil Series: Barnegat Bay I (1976), Allen Memorial Art Museum, Oberlin, Ohio
- Sayreville, N.J., Claypits, No. 49 (1976), Detroit Institute of Arts
- Sayreville Quarry II (1976), Detroit Institute of Arts
- Sayreville Strata Quartet (1976), Dia Art Foundation, Beacon, New York
- Hermosa Strata, Colorado (1977), Whitney Museum, New York
- Ledger Series: Stone Barrow, South Group, Pecos, New Mexico (1977), Art Institute of Chicago
- Mesa Verde, Colorado (1977), Art Institute of Chicago
- Passages: Mesa Verde (1977-1979), Hirshhorn Museum and Sculpture Garden, Smithsonian Institution, Washington, D.C.
- The Dalles Book (for chief Joseph) (1979), Moderna Museet, Stockholm
- Zacaba (1979), San Francisco Museum of Modern Art
- El Florido Tunil (Stones Precious of El Florido) (1980), Philadelphia Museum of Art
- Islas Encantadas Series: Materia Prima I (1981), Museum of Modern Art, New York
- Nazca Lines Star Chart and Nazca Lines Southern Hemisphere Constellation Chart Correlation (1981-1982), Museum of Modern Art, New York
- Makan Series: Bin Yusuf (1982), Buffalo AKG Art Museum, Buffalo, New York
- The Navigator (1984), Brooklyn Museum, New York
- Cape Sebastian (1988), Museum of Contemporary Art, Los Angeles
- Town Creek Mound (1987-1989), San Francisco Museum of Modern Art
- Roman Seed Calendar V (1995), Museum of Contemporary Art, Los Angeles
- Roman Berry (1996-1997), Art Institute of Chicago
- Ring of Fire (2008-2010), Musée National d'Art Moderne, Centre Pompidou, Paris
- These Fragments Against Time (2018), San Francisco Museum of Modern Art

== Awards ==
Stuart is a recipient of the CAPS Grant, New York State (1974); the Macdowell Colony Fellowship, Peterborough, New Hampshire (1974); National Endowment for the Arts Grant for Individual Artists (1974-1977; 1980), Tamarind Institute grant (1974); New York Creative Artists Public Service grant in painting (1974); Guggenheim fellowship (1975); Finnish Art Association Fellowship, Helsinki (1985); Artists' Fellowship, New York Foundation for the Arts (1987); New York City Art Commission Award, for excellence in design (1990); Purchase award, American Academy and Institute of Arts and Letters (1992); and the Anonymous Was A Woman award, from Philanthropy Advisors, LLC (2017).

== Gallery ==
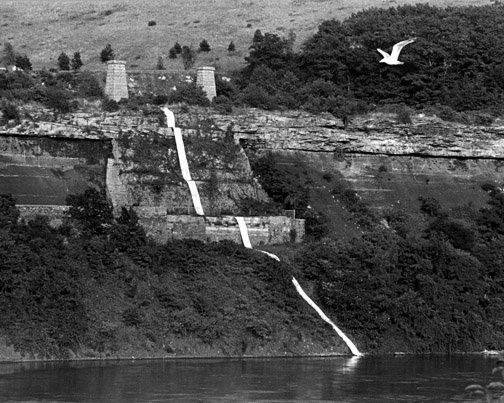
Niagara River Gorge Path Relocated / Art Park, Lewiston, NY,1975. 420' x 62" rock indentations, red Queenston, shale from the site, muslin mounted rag paper.

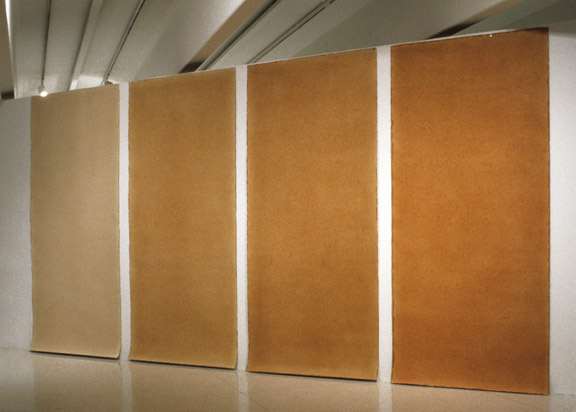
Sayreville Quarry Quartet / Sayreville, N.J.,1976. 144"x280" Earth from quarry on muslin rag paper.

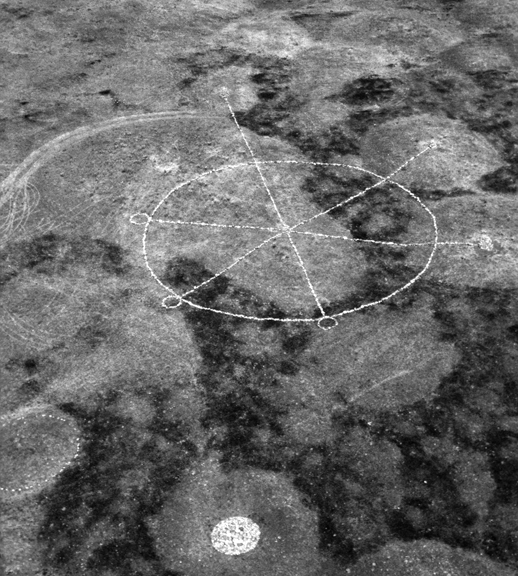
Solstice Cairns / Columbia River Gorge,1979. Overall 1,000 x 800 feet approx. 3,200 boulders.

== Bibliography ==
- Alloway, Lawrence. "Michelle Stuart: a Fabric of Significations" Artforum, v10, January 1974. pp64–65.
- ———Michelle Stuart: An Illustrated Essay. New York: State University of New York at Oneonta, 1975.
- ———"A Book Review" Art-Rite magazine, #14, Winter, 1977.
- ———Michelle Stuart: Voyages. Hillwood Art Gallery, LIU, NY 1985.
- Beal, Graham W. J. Michelle Stuart: Place and Time. Minneapolis: Walker Art Center, 1983.
- ———Second Sight Biennial IV. San Francisco: Museum of Modern Art, 1986.
- Casey, Edward S. Earth Mapping: Artists Reshaping Landscape. Minneapolis: University of Minnesota Press, 2005.
- Cullen, Deborah. "Strategies of Narration, Fifth International Cairo Biennale" in Arts in America, USIA, 1994.
- Foreman, Richard. Natural Histories. Santa Fe: Bellas Artes, 1996.
- Gregg, Gail. "Natural Selection Studio". ARTnews, March 1999. pp. 98–99.
- Hobbs, Robert. "Michelle Stuart: Atavism, Geomythology and Zen". Womanart, vol. 1, no.4 Spring-Summer 1977.
- ———Michelle Stuart, Cambridge: Massachusetts Institute of Technology, 1977.
- Lippard, Lucy R. From the Center, New York: E. P. Dutton, 1976.
- ———"Art Outdoors: In and Out of the Public Domain". Studio International, vol. 193, no. 2, Mar.-Apr. 1977.
- ———"A New Landscape Art", MS Magazine, Apr. 1977.
- ———"Quite Contrary: Body, Nature, and Ritual in Women's Art", Chrysalis, #2, Los Angeles, CA, 1977.
- ———"Surprises: An Anthological Introduction to Some Women Artists’ Books", Chrysalis, No.5, Los Angeles, CA, 1977.
- ———Strata: Nancy Graves, Eva Hesse, Michelle Stuart, Jackie Winsor. Vancouver: Vancouver Art Gallery, 1977.
- ———Michelle Stuart: From the Silent Garden, (Introduction) Williamstown, MA: Williams College, 1979.
- Lovatt, Anna, ed. Michelle Start: Drawn from Nature. Ostfildern, Germany: Hatje Cantz, 2013.
- Lovelace, Carey. "Michelle Stuart’s Silent Gardens" Arts Magazine, September 1988. pp77–79.
- Munro, Eleanor. Originals: American Women Artists. New York: Simon and Schuster, 1979.
- Stoops, Susan. Silent Gardens-the American Landscape. Waltham, MA: Rose Art Museum (Brandeis University), 1988.
- ———Ashes in Arcadia. Waltham, MA: Rose Art Museum (Brandeis University), 1988.
- ———"Michelle Stuart: A Personal Archeology", Woman's Art Journal, vol. 14, #2, Fall 1993-Winter 1994. pp. 17–21.
- ———More Than Minimal: Feminism and Abstraction in the 1970s, Waltham, MA: Rose Art Museum (Brandeis University), 1996.
- Robert Storr. On the Edge: Contemporary Art from the Werner and Elaine Dannheiser Collection, New York: The Museum of Modern Art, 1997.
- Ruzicka, Joseph. "Essential Light: The Skies of Michelle Stuart", Art in America, June 2000. pp. 86–89.
- Varnedoe, Kirk. Primitivism in 20th Century Art: Affinity of the Tribal and the Modern. New York: Museum of Modern Art, 1984.
- Westfall, Stephen. "Melancholy Mapping" Art in America, February 1987. pp 104–9.
