= Socrates Sculpture Park =

Public park in Queens, New York

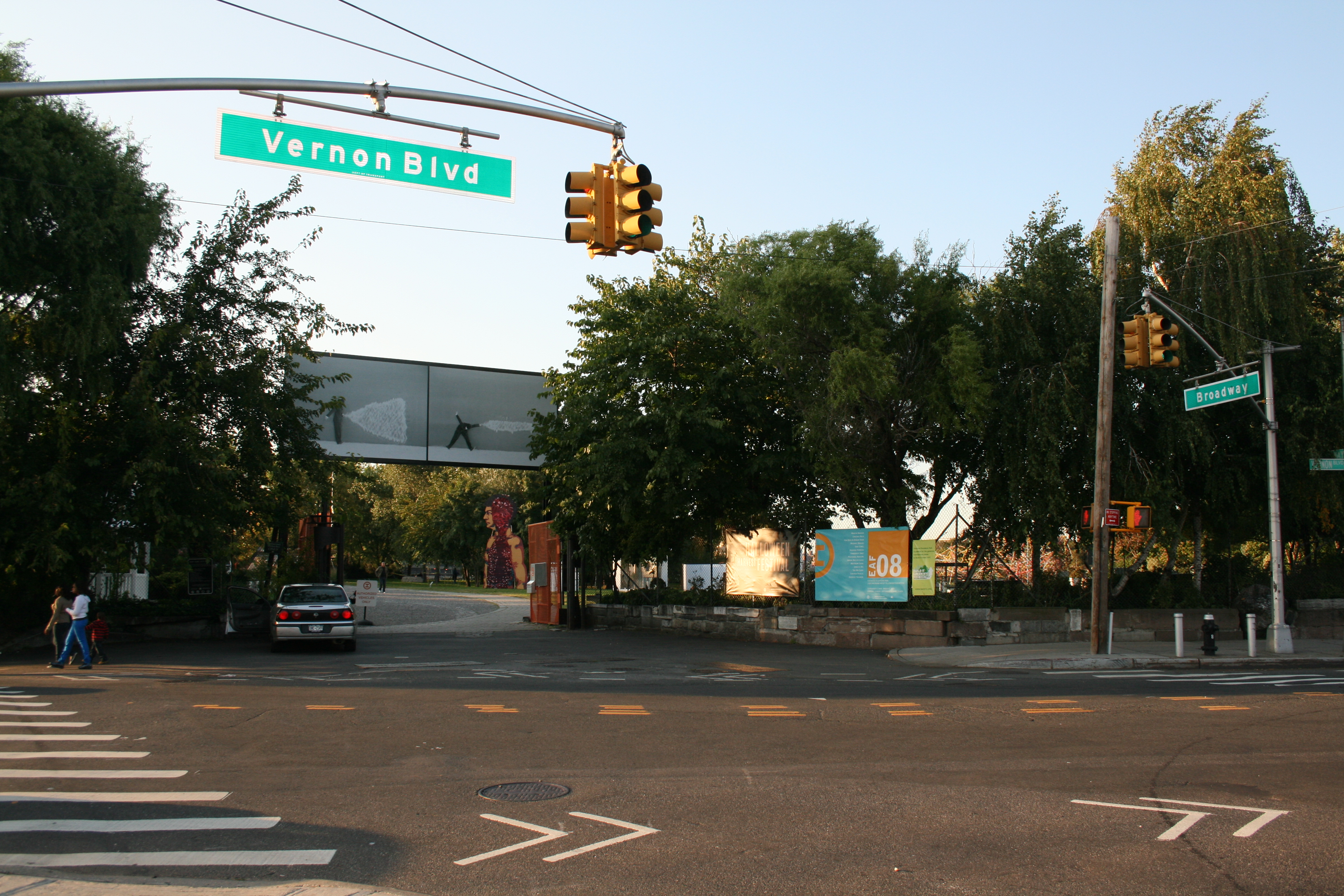
- Entrance to Socrates Sculpture Park in October 2008

- Location within New York City
- Established: 1986
- Location: 32-01 Vernon Boulevard, Long Island City, NY 11106
- Coordinates: 40.768347°N 73.936545°W
- Visitors: 89,000 (annual)
- Public transit access: New York City Subway: Broadway; MTA Bus: Q104
- Website: www.socratessculpturepark.org

Socrates Sculpture Park is an outdoor museum and public park where artists can create and exhibit sculptures and multi-media installations. It is located one block from the Noguchi Museum at the intersection of Broadway and Vernon Boulevard in the neighborhood of Astoria, Queens, New York City. In addition to exhibition space, the park offers an arts education program, artist residency program, and job training.

== History and description ==
Socrates Sculpture Park is located atop the mouth of the buried Sunswick Creek. In 1986, American sculptor Mark di Suvero created Socrates Sculpture Park on an abandoned landfill and illegal dumpsite on Gibbs Point in Astoria. The four-acre (1.6 ha) site is the largest outdoor space in New York City dedicated to exhibiting sculpture. The former landfill was renovated into the current park by a team of contemporary artists and local youths. The park operated for 14 years with only a temporary city park status. In 1998, the park was given official status by then New York City mayor Rudolph Giuliani as a permanent city park after a developer attempted to erect luxury apartments and a marina on the site after the park's lease had expired.

In 2005, the park was among 406 New York City arts and social service institutions to receive part of a $20 million grant from the Carnegie Corporation, which was made possible through a donation by New York City mayor Michael Bloomberg.

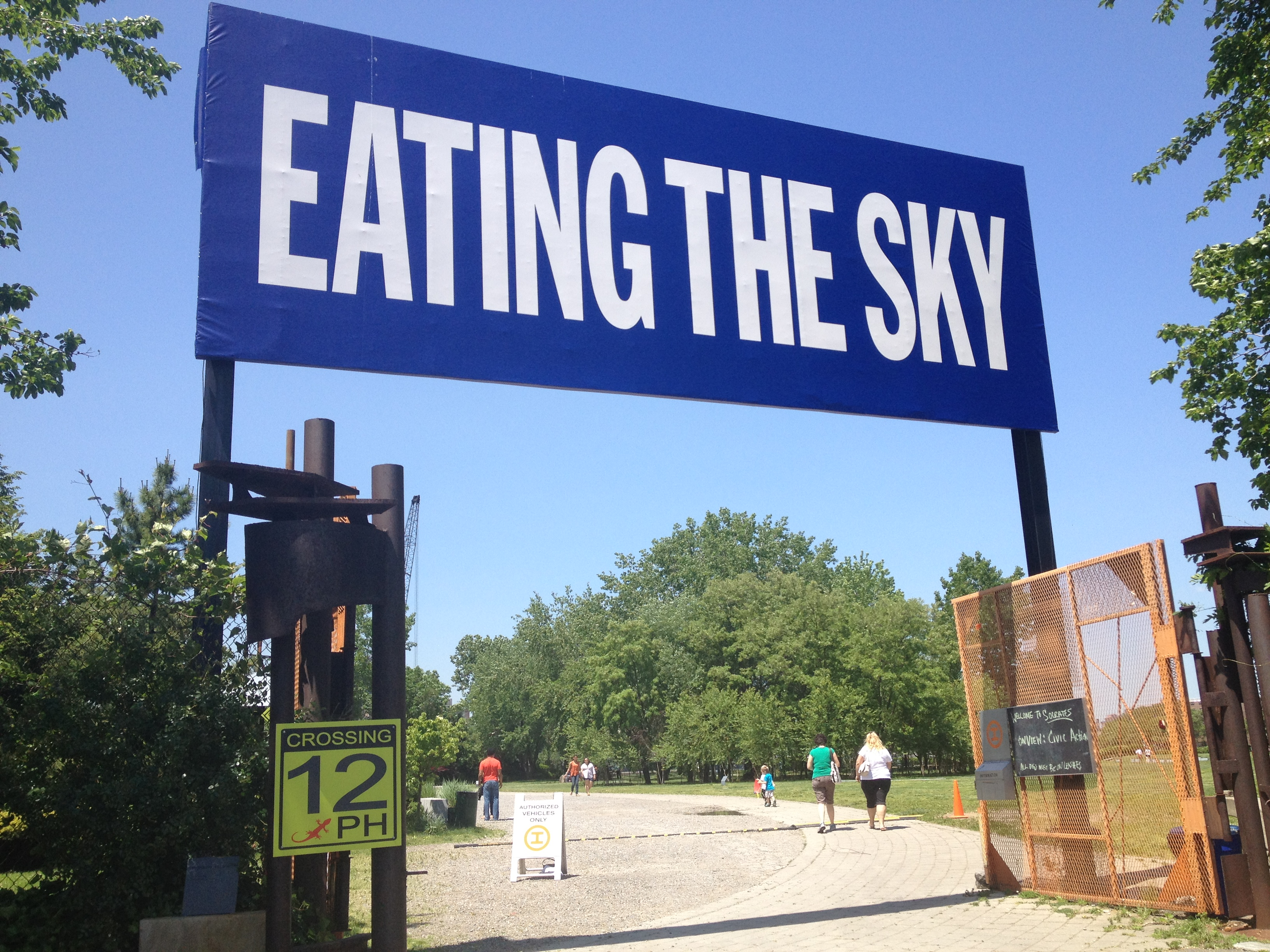
Socrates Sculpture Park Broadway Billboard 2012

At the Socrates Sculpture Park's main entrance hangs a 10-by-28-foot (3.0 by 8.5 m) billboard structure that has been an ongoing installation since 1999. The original billboard was a mirror image of the street created by artist Mathieu Borysevicz built by ongoing volunteer Ross H. Radtke, a mechanical engineer and neighbour.

New billboards are installed once or twice per year. Artists work with printmaking and photography to create an image that greets visitors as they enter the park and sets the tone for the current show. The billboards are in conjunction with each spring exhibition. The park has numerous workshops and public programming. Many artists lead tour programs of current exhibitions, there are summer art projects, and various free public events, such as yoga and capoeira on Saturdays and outdoor movie screenings on Wednesdays that begin in mid-July and end in mid-August. GrowNYC runs an Astoria Farmer's Market in the park every Saturday during the summer months.

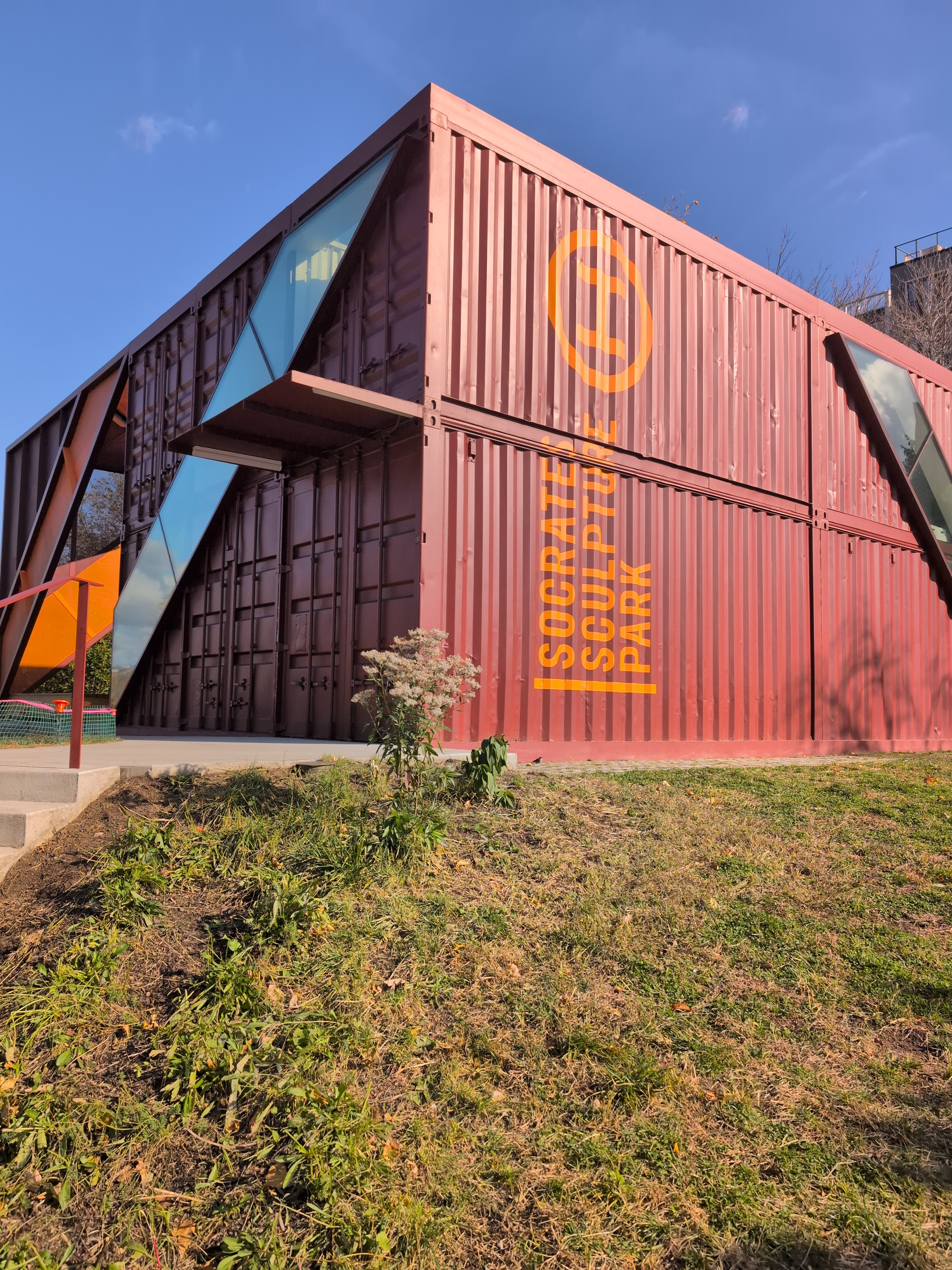
The Cubes, constructed from old shipping containers, house the administrative offices at Socrates Sculpture Park.

In January 2019, the Park announced its plan to construct and install permanent staff offices made out of shipping containers. This would be the park's first permanent on-site structure. Construction of the building, called the Cubes, was completed in 2024.

== Artists who have exhibited at Socrates Sculpture Park ==
Socrates Sculpture Park offers emerging and established artists an opportunity to make a temporary or permanent public sculpture in a New York City park. In 2018, Virginia Overton became the first female artist to have a solo exhibition at the Socrates Sculpture Park. Other artists who have shown work at Socrates Sculpture Park include:

- Vito Acconci 1986
- Maren Hassinger 1988, 2022
- Merle Temkin 1991
- Sanford Biggers 2001
- Agnes Denes 2015
- Virginia Overton 2018
- Guadalupe Maravilla 2021
- Mary Mattingly 2023
- Chakaia Booker 2026

== Governance ==
The current executive director of the park is John Hatfield, former deputy director of the New Museum of Contemporary Art. Some former executive directors of the park include Alyson Baker (2000–2011), Kathleen Gilrain (1995–2000), and Eve Sussman (1993- ).

=== Board of directors ===
- Mark di Suvero, chair emeritus
- Stuart Match Suna, president
- Robert F. Goldrich, vice president
- Ivana Mestrovic, secretary and treasurer
- Joel Shapiro
- Maxine Frankel
- Richard Gluckman, FAIA
- Hugh Hardy, FAIA
- Brooke Kamin Rapaport
- Ursula von Rydingsvard
- Deidrea Miller
- Shaun Leonardo
- Alison Saar
- Kimberly Strong
- Martin Silver, Ex Officio

== See also ==
- Landfill in the United States
