= Philanthropy Advisory Service =

The FasterCures Philanthropy Advisory Service (PAS) was first created as an online information resource for medical philanthropists. The goal of the web-based service is to accelerate drug and therapy development by increasing support and directing funds to high impact, nonprofit disease research organizations. It provides data about diseases and associated research organizations, allowing philanthropists to make informed investment decisions, match their interests to specific research organizations, and assess the outcome of their philanthropic investment.

In 2015, PAS spun out of FasterCures and became its own freestanding center at the Milken Institute, namely the Center for Strategic Philanthropy. The Milken Institute Center for Strategic Philanthropy conducts deep due diligence across a range of issue areas, promotes creative and well-informed giving strategies, and advises families and foundations on where and how to channel their philanthropy to maximize a return on their investment.
