= Jennifer McGregor (curator) =

American curator and arts planner

Jennifer McGregor is an American curator and arts planner. Based in New York, she was the Director of Arts and senior curator at Wave Hill, a public garden and cultural center in the Bronx, New York City. There she curated exhibitions and oversees performances that relate to nature, culture and site. Noteworthy projects included an immersive outdoor installation by Chris Doyle, The Lightening – A Project for Wave Hill's Aquatic Garden and the exhibition Field Notes featuring projects by Matthew Friday, David McQueen and Michelle Stuart.

McGregor started working in the field of public art as the first director of the New York City's Percent for Art Program between 1983 and 1990. She has served as a consultant on many public art and policy projects including a public art plan for the Rose Fitzgerald Kennedy Greenway in Boston, Massachusetts, in 2012; a public art plan for Laramie, Wyoming, in 2015, and project management for New York City's Flight 587 Memorial in 2006; managed the commissioned artwork by Daniel Hauben for the New Instructional Building at the Bronx Community College, and more.
