= Salvadoran Museum of Art =

Art museum in El Salvador

- Museo de Arte de El Salvador
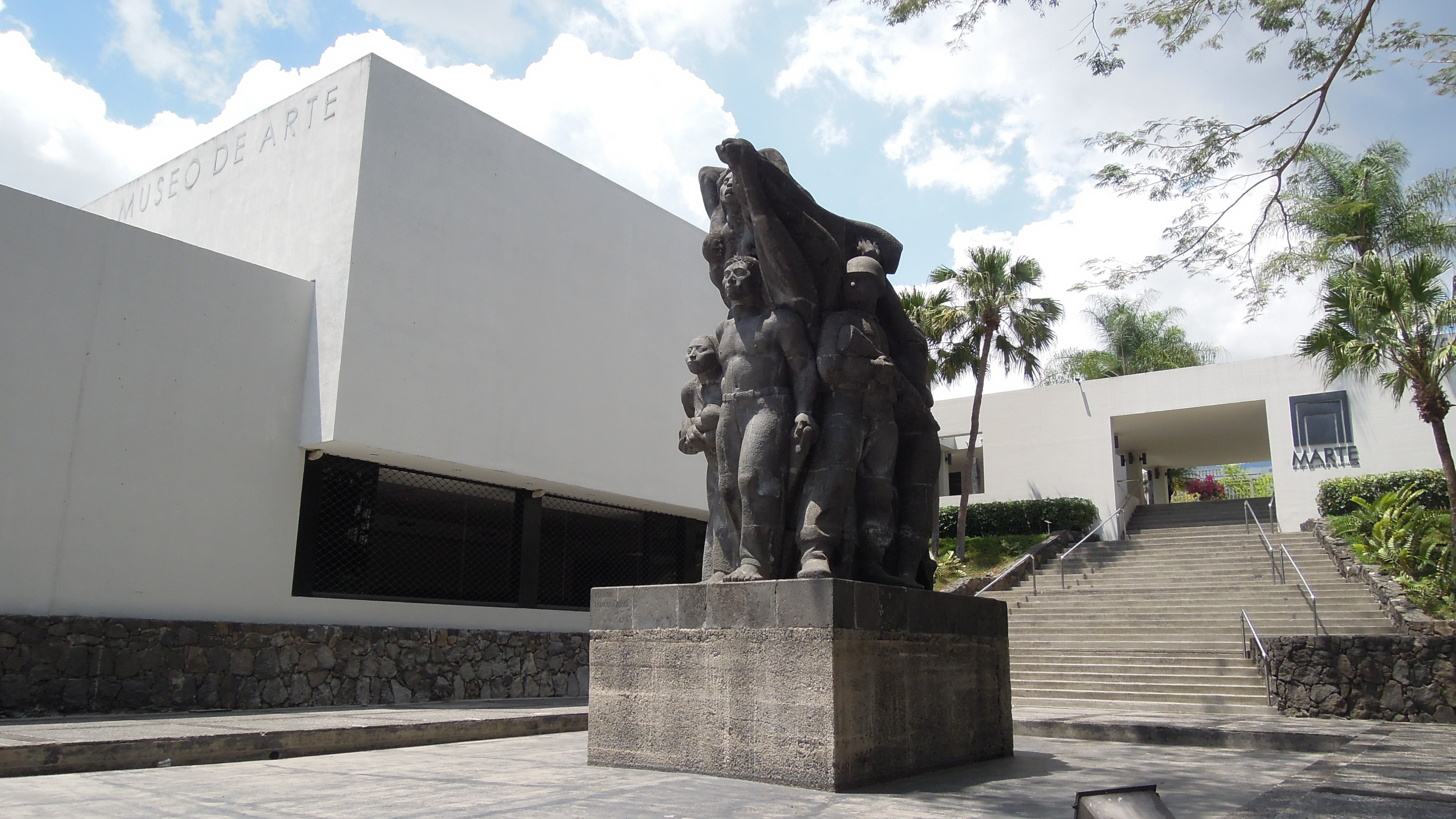
- MARTE with the Salvadoran Monument to the Constitution in the foreground.
- Established: 22 May 2003
- Location: San Salvador, El Salvador
- Coordinates: 13°41′34″N 89°14′32″W
- Type: Art museum
- President: Michel Langlais
- Website: museomarte.org

The Salvadoran Museum of Art (Spanish: Museo de Arte de El Salvador, MARTE) is an art museum in San Salvador, the capital city of El Salvador. The museum was first opened on 22 May 2003. It is open to the public and receives more than half a million visitors annually.

== History ==
The Association of the Salvadoran Museum of Art was established in 2000. Its first president was Eli Lecha de Lindo, granddaughter of Salvadoran painter Valero Lecha. Members of the association travelled to Mexico and worked with Conaculta to establish a plan for the museum.

The El Salvador Museum of Art was inaugurated three years later on 22 May 2003. The museum building was purpose-built at a cost of US$1.8 million. It was designed by architect Salvador Choussy and covers 2,274 square metres.

For its 20th anniversary, MARTE opened an exhibition covering the work of 54 Salvadoran artists from 1800 to 2023.

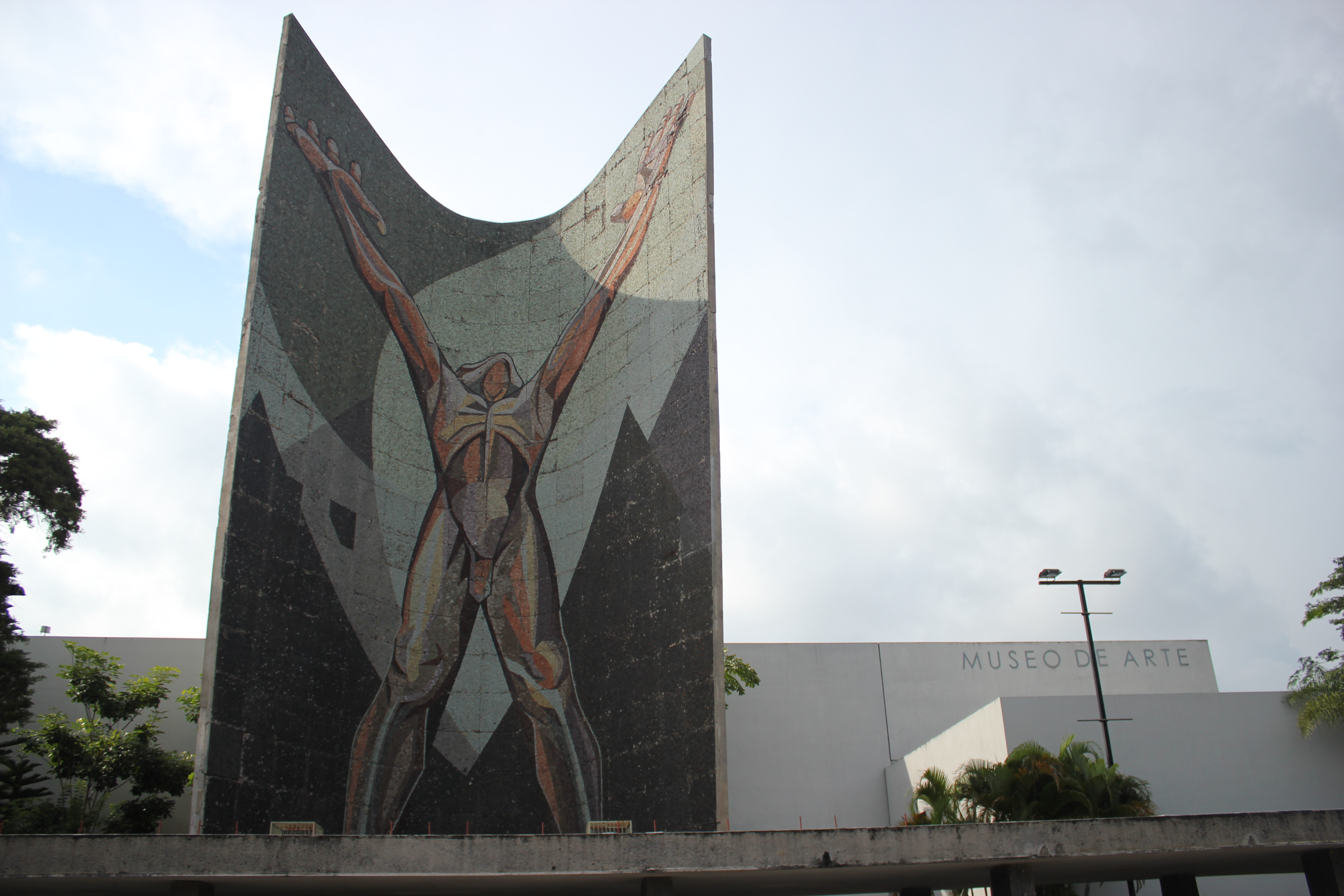
The Salvadoran Monument to the Revolution, with MARTE behind.
