= Agnes Denes =

American artist

- Born: May 31, 1931 (age 95); Budapest, Hungary
- Education: New School; Columbia University
- Notable work: Visual Philosophy, Wheatfield, Tree Mountain
- Movement: Conceptual Art
- Website: agnesdenesstudio.com

Agnes Denes (Dénes Ágnes; born 1931 in Budapest) is a Hungarian-born American conceptual artist based in New York City. She is known for works in a wide range of media—from poetry and philosophical writings to extremely detailed drawings, sculptures, and iconic land art works, such as Wheatfield — A Confrontation (1982), a two-acre field of wheat in downtown Manhattan, commissioned by the Public Art Fund, and Tree Mountain—A Living Time Capsule (1992–96) in Ylöjärvi, Finland. Her work Rice/Tree/Burial with Time Capsule (1968–79) is recognized as one of the earliest examples of ecological art.

== Early life and career ==
Born in Budapest, Hungary, in 1931, her family survived World War II, the Nazi occupation, and moved to Sweden on their way to the United States. As a teenager, she created her first environmental/philosophical work, Bird Project, in Sweden, comparing migrating bird colonies to people — the migrants of the world. She studied painting at the New School and Columbia University in New York.

She began her artistic career as a poet. Her poetic practice eventually became works of a unique intellectual content and form she later called Visual Philosophy. She has said that the repeated changes in language led her to focus on the visual arts. She soon abandoned painting, due to the constraints of the canvas, and focused broadly on ideas she could explore in other mediums, saying, "I found its vocabulary limiting."

In the early 1970s, she joined the A.I.R. Gallery as a founding member. She has since participated in more than 600 exhibitions at galleries and museums throughout the world, and has written six books. She has one son, Robert T. Frankel and twin grandchildren, Ian and Alessa Frankel.

Her image is included in the iconic 1972 poster Some Living American Women Artists by Mary Beth Edelson.

== Selected works ==
=== Ecological ===
Rice/Tree/Burial (1968, Eco-Logic, Sullivan County, New York; re-created 1977 at Artpark)

As a pioneer of Land Art, Agnes Denes created Rice/Tree/Burial in 1968 in Sullivan County, New York. Acknowledged as the first site-specific performance piece with ecological concerns, it was enacted ten years later on an expanded scale at Artpark in Lewiston, New York. This performance piece involved planting rice seeds in a field in upstate New York, chaining surrounding trees and burying a time capsule filled with copies of her haiku. "It was about communication with the earth," Denes said, "and communicating with the future.""

Agnes Denes at Artpark (1977-1979)

During her time at Artpark, Denes recreated her Rice/Tree/Burial piece from 1968. In 1977, she planted a half acre (0.2 ha) of rice 150 feet (45 m) above the spot where Niagara Falls had originally formed. The land itself that she worked on was known to have been an industrial dumping ground, which affected the quality of the rice. In 1978, she continued the project by chaining together trees in the forest in the park to symbolize interference with growth. On August 20, 1979, Denes buried a time capsule at 47° 10′ longitude, 79° 2′ 32″ latitude set to be opened in the twenty-third century. The capsule includes microfilmed responses of university students to questions about the nature of humanity. Along with the rice, time capsule, and ceremonial chaining of trees in the park, Denes shot photographs of Niagara Falls for this iteration of Rice/Tree/Burial to "add natural force as the fourth element and fuse the other three".

Wheatfield — A Confrontation (1982, Battery Park, New York City)

After months of preparations, in May 1982, a two-acre (0.8 ha) field of wheat was planted on a landfill in lower Manhattan, two blocks from Wall Street and the World Trade Center, facing the Statue of Liberty, sponsored by the Public Art Fund. To create the work, 200 truckloads of dirt were brought in and 285 furrows were dug by hand and cleared of rocks and garbage. The seeds were sown by hand and the furrows covered with soil. The field was maintained for four months, cleared of wheat smut, weeded, fertilized, and sprayed against mildew fungus, and an irrigation system was set up. The crop was harvested on August 16 and yielded over 1,000 pounds (455 kg) of healthy, golden wheat.

Tree Mountain — A living time capsule (1996, Ylöjärvi, Finland)

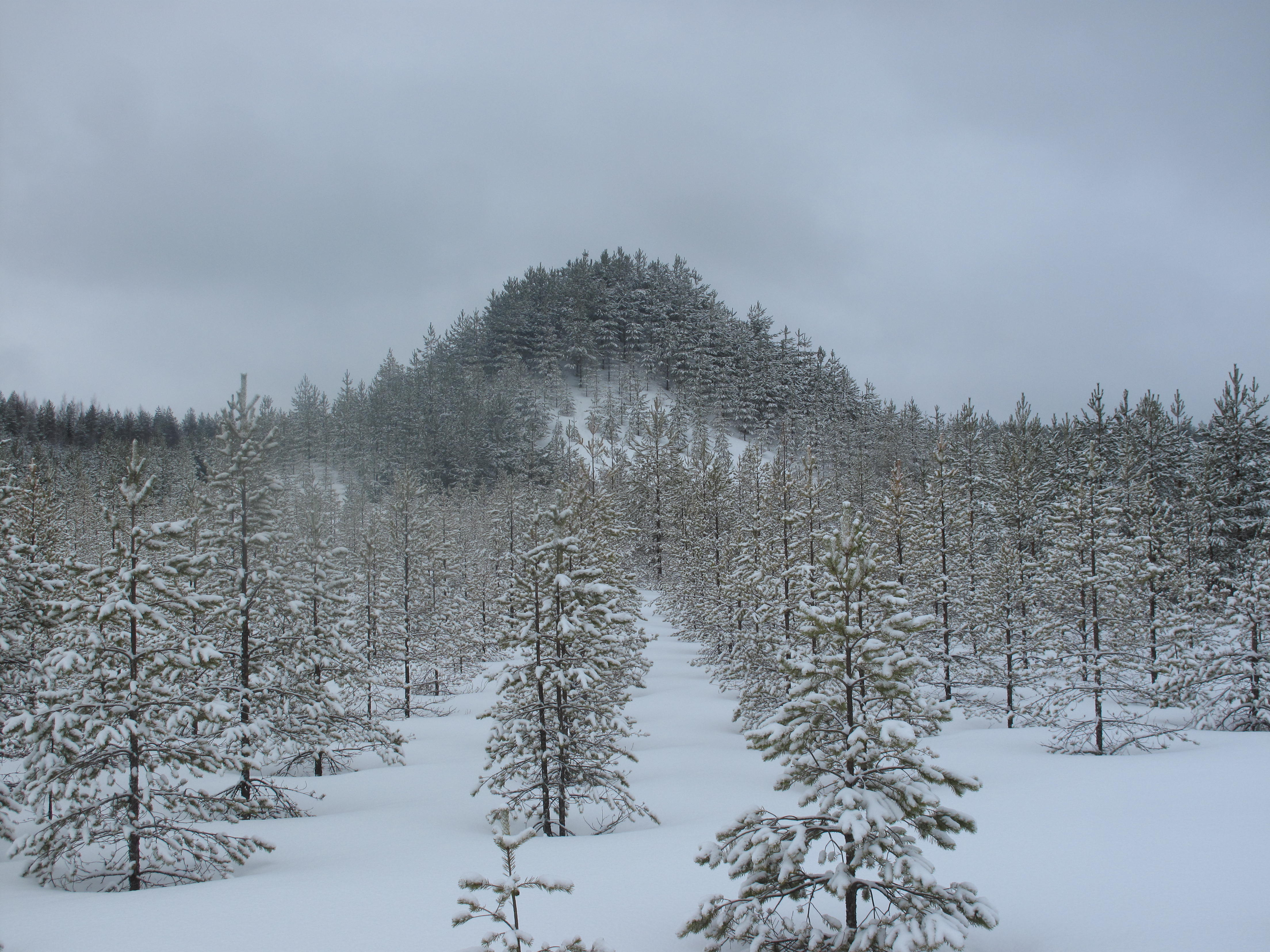
Tree Mountain in the winter

A monumental earthwork reclamation project and the first human-made virgin forest, situated in Ylöjärvi in the Pirkanmaa region of Finland. The site was dedicated by the President of Finland upon its completion in 1996 and is legally protected for the next four hundred years.

A Forest for Australia (Melbourne, Australia, 1998)

6000 trees were planted into five spirals with each spiral containing three species of tree that, when fully grown, would reach different heights. The resulting shape of each spiral resembled a step pyramid. The trees helped alleviate serious land erosion and desertification threatening Australia.

Nieuwe Hollandse Waterlinie Master Plan (2000)

A 25-year master plan to unite a 100 kilometer-long string of forts dating from the sixteenth to the nineteenth centuries comprising the New Dutch Waterline in the Netherlands. Incorporating water and flood management, urban planning, historical preservation, landscaping, and tourism into a single plan.

North Waterfront Park Masterplan (1988-1991, Berkeley, California)

A conceptual master plan was developed for the conversion of a 97-acre municipal landfill, surrounded by water on three sides in the San Francisco Bay, into an oasis for people and nature.

The Living Pyramid (2015, Socrates Sculpture Park, Long Island, New York)

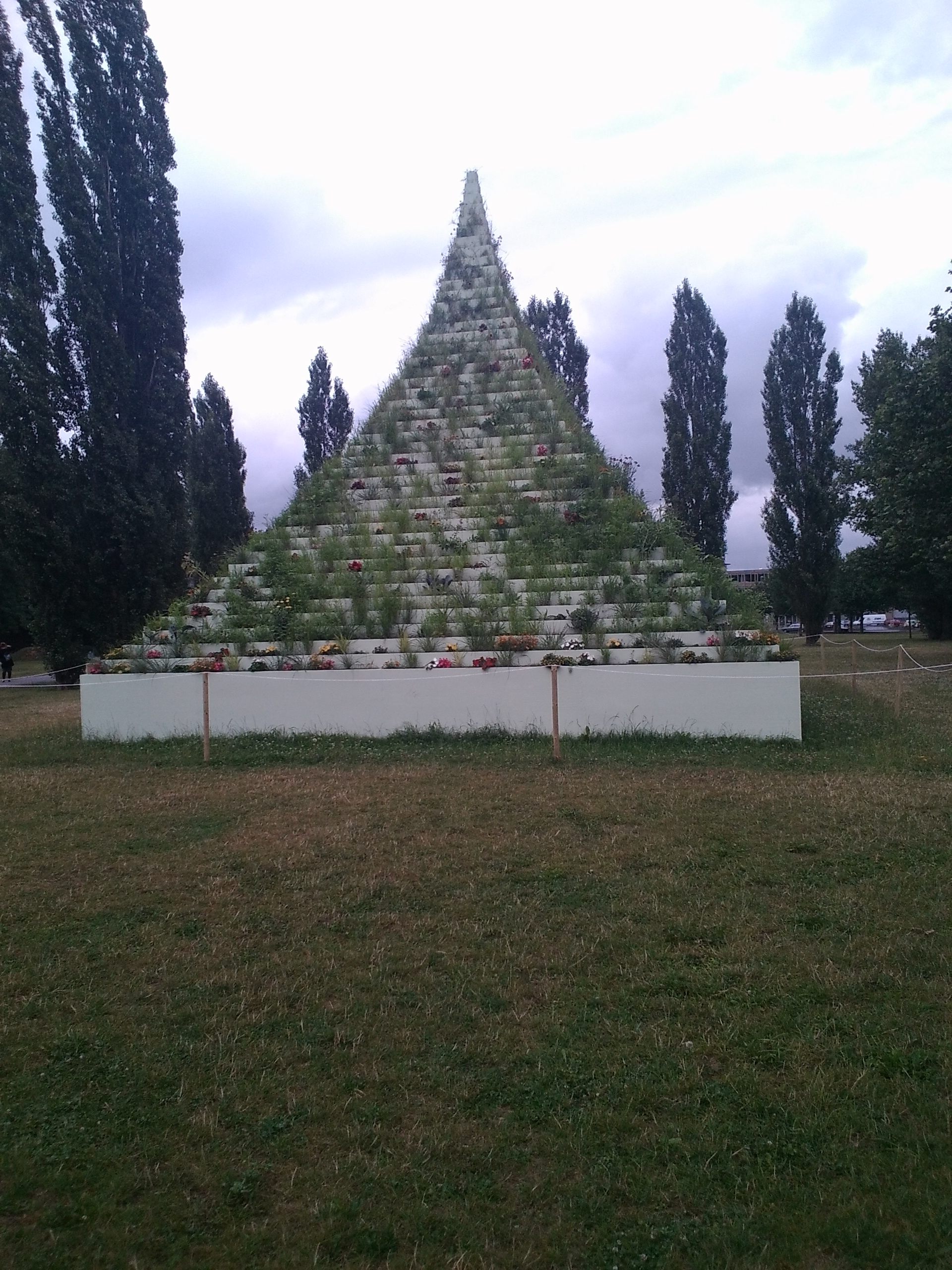
The Living Pyramid, Agnes Denes, documenta 14, Kassel, Nordstadtpark

The first in a series of large earth sculptures, The Living Pyramid was the first land art work by the artist in New York City in over 3 decades. Commission by the Socrates Sculpture Park, it was on view from May through October 2015, and recreated in 2017 for documenta 14 in Kassel, Germany.

The Living Pyramid (2022, Sakıp Sabancı Museum, Istanbul, Turkey)

A further iteration of The Living Pyramid was installed in the garden of the Sakıp Sabancı Museum in Istanbul from 13 September 2022 to 30 October 2023, with plants from the flora of Istanbul placed on its sides according to their need for shade or sun.

=== Visual philosophy ===
Beginning in 1968, she began an intensive exploration of philosophy through art. The result was, according to Jill Hartz of Cornell University, "an amazing body of work, distinguished by its intellectual rigor, aesthetic beauty, conceptual analysis, and environmental concern."

- Paradox and Essence (Philosophical Drawings), 1976, Published by Tau/ma Press, Rome, Italy, in English and Italian. Edition of 200; 60 pages
- Sculptures of the Mind, 1976, Published by the University of Akron Press, Akron, Ohio. Edition of 1,000, 250 signed and numbered; 50 pages
- Isometric Systems in Isotropic Space: Map Projections (from the Study of Distortions Series, 1973-1979), 1979. Published by Visual Studies Workshop Press, Rochester, New York. Edition of 200 hardback copies in silver foil, signed and numbered by the artist; edition of 600 in paperback; 100 pages, color and black and white throughout, 29 original drawings specially created for the book, 22 transparent pages.
- Original drawings for Isometric Systems, from the Museum of Modern Art Collection
- Early Philosophical Drawings, Monoprints, and Sculpture 1970-1973

=== Sculpture ===
- Sculptures of the Mind 1968-2012

=== Writing ===
See three titles under Visual Philosophy, above.

- Book of Dust: The Beginning and the End of Time and Thereafter, 1989 Visual Studies Workshop Press, Rochester, New York. Edition of 1,100 of which 200 are signed with an original artwork. Insert ("The Debate - 1 Million B.C. - 1 Million A.D.); 200 pages, 16 full-page duotones
- The Human Argument, 2008 Spring Publications, Putnam, Connecticut.
- Poetry Walk—Reflections: Pools of Thought, 2000 Charlottesville, Va.: University of Virginia Art Museum.

== Catalogues ==
- Agnes Denes: Perspectives, Corcoran Gallery of Art, Washington, DC, 1974
- Agnes Denes: Sculptures of the Mind / Philosophical Drawings by Amerika Haus Berlin, 1978
- Agnes Denes 1968 -1980, Gary Garrels curator, Hayden Gallery, MIT, Boston, 1980
- Agnes Denes: Concept into Form, Works : 1970-1990, Arts Club of Chicago, 1990
- Agnes Denes by Jill Hartz, Herbert F. Johnson Museum of Art, Cornell University, 1992
- The Visionary Art of Agnes Denes: An Exhibition of 85 Works, Gibson Gallery, 1996
- Project for Public Spaces, a Retrospective, Samek Art Gallery, Bucknell University, Lewisburg PA; 2003
- Agnes Denes: Work 1969 - 2013, curated and edited by Florence Derieux, FRAC Champagne-Ardenne, Firstsite Colchester, Mousse Publishing, 2013-2016
- Agnes Denes: Absolutes and Intermediates, edited by Emma Enderby, The Shed, 2019

== Public collections ==
Denes has more than ten works in the Museum of Modern Art's collection. In the Metropolitan Museum, the artist has five pieces in the permanent collection. At the Whitney Museum of American Art, Denes has three pieces in the permanent collection. Beyond that, the artist has work in forty-three additional museum permanent collections.

== Critical response ==
What ties it all together is Ms. Denes's insistence on marrying ambitious intellectual ideas with exquisite formal execution. In contrast to many of her conceptual and land-art peers, she has always been deeply involved with drawing.

— Carol Kino, New York Times

In the history of art there have been a few artists' artists—individuals who have emphasized in their work the raising of provocative questions and who have also tested the limits of art by taking it into new, unforeseen areas and by using it for distinctly new functions. Agnes Denes is one of these special artists.

— Art historian Robert Hobbs, 1992

A gallery exhibition can only suggest how far and wide the polymathic Ms. Denes has ranged over material and mental worlds during the past four decades. It would take a full-scale museum retrospective to do that.

— Ken Johnson, New York Times 2012

== Selected solo exhibitions ==
- 2020: "Agnes Denes: Photos of the Mind, 1969–2002," Leslie Tonkonow Artworks + Projects, ADAA Member Viewing Rooms
- 2019: "Agnes Denes: Absolutes and Intermediates," The Shed, New York
- 2018: "Agnes Denes: Works 1969 - 2018," acb Gallery, Budapest, Hungary
- 2017: "Agnes Denes: Truth Approximations," Leslie Tonkonow Artworks + Projects, New York
- 2015: "In the Realm of Pyramids: The Visual Philosophy of Agnes Denes," Leslie Tonkonow Artworks + Projects, New York
- 2013: "Agnes Denes: Work: 1967 – 2013," Firstite, Essex, United Kingdom (catalog)
- 2012: "Agnes Denes: Body Prints, Philosophical Drawings, and Map Projections 1969-1978," Santa Monica Museum of Art, CA (catalog)

"Agnes Denes, Sculptures of the Mind: 1968 to Now," Leslie Tonkonow Gallery, New York

- 2010: "Agnes Denes: Body Prints and Other Early Prints on Paper", Leslie Tonkonow Gallery, New York
- 2009: "Philosophy in the Land II", Leslie Tonkonow Gallery, New York
- 2008: "Agnes Denes: Art for the Third Millennium-Creating a New World View", Ludwig Museum, Budapest, Hungary
- 2007: "Uprooted & Deified – The Golden Tree", BravinLee Programs, New York
- 2005: "Agnes Denes: Projects for Public Places-A Retrospective", Ewing Gallery, University of Tennessee, Knoxville, Tenn.
- 2004: "Agnes Denes: Projects for Public Places-A Retrospective", Chelsea Museum, New York
- 2003: "Agnes Denes: Projects for Public Places-A Retrospective", organized by Samek Gallery, Bucknell University, Lewisburg, Pa. (catalog).

Travel: Herron Gallery, Herron School of Art, Indiana University, Indianapolis;

Haggerty Museum of Art, Marquette University, Milkwaukee, Wisc.;

Naples Museum of Art, Naples, Florida.

- 1998: "Agnes Denes-Fragmentation", Gallerie Il Bulino, Rome, Italy
- 1997: "Anima/Persona-From the Rice/Tree/Burial Project", Joyce Goldstein Gallery, New York

"The Pyramid Suite and Project Drawings", View Gallery, New York

- 1996: "The Visionary Art of Agnes Denes", Gibson Gallery, SUNY at Potsdam, New York
- 1995: "Philosophy in the Land", Joyce Goldstein Gallery, New York
- 1994: "Drawings of Agnes Denes 1969-1994", Wynn Kramarsky, New York
- 1992: "Agnes Denes: A Retrospective", Herbert F. Johnson Museum of Art, Cornell University, Ithaca, N.Y. (book and travel)
- 1990: "Agnes Denes - Concept into Form, Works 1970-1990", Arts Club of Chicago, Ill. (catalog)

"Agnes Denes - El Concepto Hecho Forma, Obras, 1970-1990", Anselmo Alvarez Galeria de Arte, Madrid, Spain (catalog)

- 1986: Ricardo Barreto Arte Contemporaneo, Guadalajara, Mexico
- 1985: University of Hawaii Art Gallery, Honolulu, Hawaii

Northern Illinois University Art Gallery, Chicago, Ill.

- 1982: "Meister der Zeichnung" (Master of Drawing) Invitational, Kunsthalle, Nürnberg, W. Germany (catalog)
- 1981: "Print Retrospective", Elise Meyer, Inc., New York
- 1980: "Agnes Denes 1968-1980", Hayden Gallery, Massachusetts Institute of Technology, Cambridge, Mass. (catalog)

"Anima/Persona - The Seed", Elise Meyer, Inc., New York

"Agnes Denes", Galleriet, Lund, Sweden

Galerie Aronowitsch, Stockholm, Sweden

- 1979: "Agnes Denes Work: 1968-1978", Institute of Contemporary Art, London, England

Studio d'Arte Cannaviello, Milan, Italy

- 1978: "Agnes Denes - Philosophical Drawings", Amerika Haus, W. Berlin, W. Germany (catalog)

"Agnes Denes: Work 1968-78", Ikon Gallery, Birmingham, England (catalog)

"Sculptures of the Mind," Centre Culturel Americain, Paris, France

- 1977: Tyler School of Art, Temple University, Philadelphia, Penn.

"Animi Pathema - The Emotional Animal", 112 Greene Street Gallery, New York

- 1976: "Agnes Denes", Douglass College, Rutgers University, New Brunswick, N. J.

"Agnes Denes", Newport Harbor Art Museum, Newport Beach, Calif.

"Sculptures of the Mind", University of Akron, Ohio (catalog)

- 1975: Stefanotty Gallery, New York
- 1974: "Agnes Denes: Perspectives", Corcoran Gallery of Art, Washington, D.C. (catalog)

Ohio State University, Columbus, Ohio

- 1972: A.I.R. Gallery, New York
- 1968: Ruth White Gallery, New York
- 1967: New Masters Gallery, New York
- 1965: Lewisohn Hall, Columbia University, New York

== Awards ==
- Four fellowships from the National Endowment for the Arts
- Four grants from the New York State Council on the Arts
- CAPS grant (1972)
- National Endowment Fellowships (1974 and 1975)
- The DAAD Fellowship, Berlin (1978)
- American Academy of Arts and Letters Purchase Award (1985)
- Eugene McDermott Award in the Arts at MIT (1990)
- Rome Prize from the American Academy in Rome (1998)
- Jill Watson Award for Transdisciplinary Achievement in the Arts from Carnegie Mellon University (1999)
- Anonymous Was a Woman Award (2007)
- Ambassador's Award for Cultural Diplomacy (2008) from the American Embassy in Hungary
- Art Innovation Impact Award, The Phillips Collection, Washington, DC.(2020)
