= Alice Adams (artist) =

American artist (born 1930)

- Born: November 16, 1930 (age 95); New York City, U.S.
- Education: Columbia University (BFA), École nationale d'art décoratif d'Aubusson
- Known for: Sculpture, site-specific sculpture, land art, public art, woven forms, American tapestry
- Awards: Guggenheim Fellowship, National Academy of Arts and Letters Award in Sculpture

Alice Adams (born November 16, 1930) is an American visual artist known for her sculpture and site-specific land art in the 1970s and for her major public art projects in transit systems, airports, university campuses and other urban sites throughout the United States since 1986. Her earlier work in tapestry and woven forms was important in the American fiber art movement.

== Biography ==
Alice Adams was born on November 16, 1930, in New York City, and grew up in Jamaica, Queens.

In 1953, she graduated with a BFA degree in painting from Columbia University. Following graduation, she went to Aubusson, France to study tapestry weaving and design at École nationale d'art décoratif d'Aubusson.

== Career ==
Except for two years spent in France, Adams has lived in New York City, traveling for collaboration and consultation on public art projects in the United States and abroad. There have been several stages in her eclectic career.

In 2002 Adams was awarded a Rockefeller Foundation Residency at Bellagio Study & Conference Center, in Italy. She a is also a member of American Abstract Artists.

=== Tapestries and woven forms ===
After completing her studies in Aubusson, Adams returned to New York in 1956. She brought a tapestry loom from Aubusson to weave her own designs, but her practice began to depart from traditional tapestry technique. Working on what conventionally had been the back of the tapestry, she developed surface articulation and added materials like rope, sisal twine, and found objects to the traditional wool and cotton surface. She and other innovators, like Lenore Tawney, Claire Zeisler and Sheila Hicks, moved weaving off the loom and into the realm of three-dimensional form. Her work was part of the influential "Woven Forms" exhibition at the Museum of Contemporary Crafts in 1963.

In 1963, Adams began using tarred rope, chain link fence and steel cable in sculptures that preceded the use of such materials by other artists. She discovered various knotting, looped structures used in sailor's knots and techniques for covering ship's railings, but enlarged the scale and the materials traditionally used. In 1966, Lucy Lippard included three examples of this work in "Eccentric Abstraction," the exhibition she curated at the Fischbach Gallery in New York City. The sculpture in this exhibition ran counter to the minimal "primary structures" of Robert Morris and Sol LeWitt, suggesting more intuitive and idiosyncratic approaches. The show included Louise Bourgeois, Bruce Nauman, Eva Hesse, Frank Viner, Donald Potts, and Gary Kuehn, most of whom were showing in New York for the first time.

=== Sculpture ===
Adams' sculptures after 1968 explored the architectural elements of the wall, the corner, the column and the vault. Continuing the use of flexible materials, she painted layers of latex on the old plaster walls of her studio, stripped them off, and then mounted the casts on two-by-four frameworks leaning against the wall. She saw her practice as a way of drawing people into spaces that are initially familiar but that later appear new. She used familiar building materials like wood lath, covering or partially covering frameworks to create free-standing partitions, columns and vaults. This work was shown at the 55 Mercer Gallery and in the Whitney Museum Annuals in 1969 and 1971.

After doing her first outdoor work in 1977 using traditional barn framing techniques, she began to work with large wooden slabs and timbers and laminated wood arches to make sculptures that, though not precisely architectural fragments, suggested larger structures. "...Adams' pieces always hint at something larger. Doorways hint at the wider world, and personal memories grow into collective memories about built places." This architecture related sculpture was shown in 1979 and 1981 at the Hal Bromm Gallery in New York, and in 1984 was part of "An International survey of Painting and Sculpture" at The Museum of Modern Art, New York.

=== Earthworks and site sculpture ===
Adams' site-specific sculptures of the 1970s provide a link to her later and most recent public art. Several of these employed heavy earth moving equipment and "Shorings" (1978) at the Artpark, Lewiston, New York; "Mound for Viewing Slope and Sky" (1981) at Princeton University; and "Vertical Up for OOIC" (1983) in Omaha, Nebraska; depended upon the shape, weight and placement of the earth. In other works like "Leveling" (1977) and "Three Structures on a Slope" (1978), the structure measured the elevation of the ground on which it stood and earlier references to architecture developed into actual architectural exercises. The "Adams' House" (1977) and the "Lost House" (1979) of this time used the structure and vision of the house as containers of collective and individual memory. The work of women whose work related to the 1970s was organized into the exhibition "Decoys, Complexes and Triggers: Feminism and Land Art in the 1970s" in 2008 at the Sculpture Center in NYC and included Adams, Mary Miss, Nancy Holt, Jackie Ferrara, Alice Aycock, Agnes Denes, Michelle Stuart, Suzanne Harris and Lynda Benglis.

=== Public art ===
Adams' site sculptures of the 1970s at venues like the Artpark and the Nassau County Museum of Art were commissioned and funded but, like many similar projects, temporary. Her first permanent public commission, "Small Park with Arches", was fabricated in her studio and installed at the Toledo Botanical Garden in 1984. This work used the vocabulary of wooden beams and laminated arches, and continued a characteristic direction of her earlier work; the creation of places to be inhabited.

In the following years, she often introduced new materials and forms into her projects. While Adams employed boat builders to continue the use of wood in "The River", for a Middletown, Connecticut hospital common room, for "African Garden", a schoolyard in East New York, Brooklyn, she combined cast iron bases and laminated wood seats in stools and benches inspired by African furniture. A commission for the Port Authority of New York and New Jersey entitled "Glider Park," suspended seating under steel pavilions designed to incorporate the growth of the trees on the site. Subsequently, precast and cast-in-place concrete structures started to appear as well as cast, etched, and fabricated, steel, bronze and aluminum and very often, water and plant material played major roles.

Two large outdoor meeting places on college campuses, The Roundabout in Center City Philadelphia and Scroll Circle at the University of Delaware, create major focal points. Each incorporates water walls, brick or granite paving, cast concrete bluestone-clad seating, plantings and lighting. At The University of Texas at San Antonio an austere conical granite fountain forms the center of the "Healer's Spring" rotunda. In the "Wall of the Tides", water flows over a mosaic while spheres across a stainless steel arch above reflect both the moving water and the passing clouds.

Two of her major works form prominent centerpieces in airport concourses. Giant aluminum arches filled with multi-colored argon lean toward each other in "Beaded Circle Crossing" to span a moving walkway at the Denver International Airport. A diagrammatic aluminum boat frame sits atop one of three large limestone and thick glass-clad planter platforms of the "Stone and Glass Gardens" on two levels of the Fort Lauderdale/Hollywood International Airport.

==== Collaborative work ====
Adams' commissioned projects as sole designer have been interspersed with collaborative work. Learning the architectural process from concept, through design development and construction documents has informed and often guided her practice. Adams' first design team appointment was in 1985 when she worked for five years with artists and architects to design the stations of the Downtown Seattle Transit Tunnel. The experience of working with many trades and materials and learning to cope with the complex stages of documentation for major infrastructure projects convinced her that collaboration can lead to an expansion of artistic vision, enlarging the possibilities of ways an artist can affect large public infrastructure programs. Subsequently, she collaborated on the design of the Saint Louis, Missouri, MetroLink (1988–1990); the Ronkonkoma, New York Long Island Railroad Station (1994–1995); and the Montclair State University at Little Falls Station of the New Jersey Transit System (2004). She served as consultant with Jack Mackie and Andrew Darke to the Birmingham, England, Midland Metro Light-Rail System (1992). As co-lead artist she and Marek Ranis wrote the art master plan and collaborated on the design of landscape and infrastructure components of the Charlotte (NC) Area Transit System (2002–2006).

Adams' public sculpture throughout the United States since 1986 was displayed in models and photo documentation in a retrospective at the Lehman College Gallery in 2000.

== Works ==
- The Roundabout 1992
- African Garden 1994
- Beaded Circle Crossing 1994
- Stone and Glass Gardens 2003
