= Public art in Battery Park City =

Artwork in New York City neighborhood

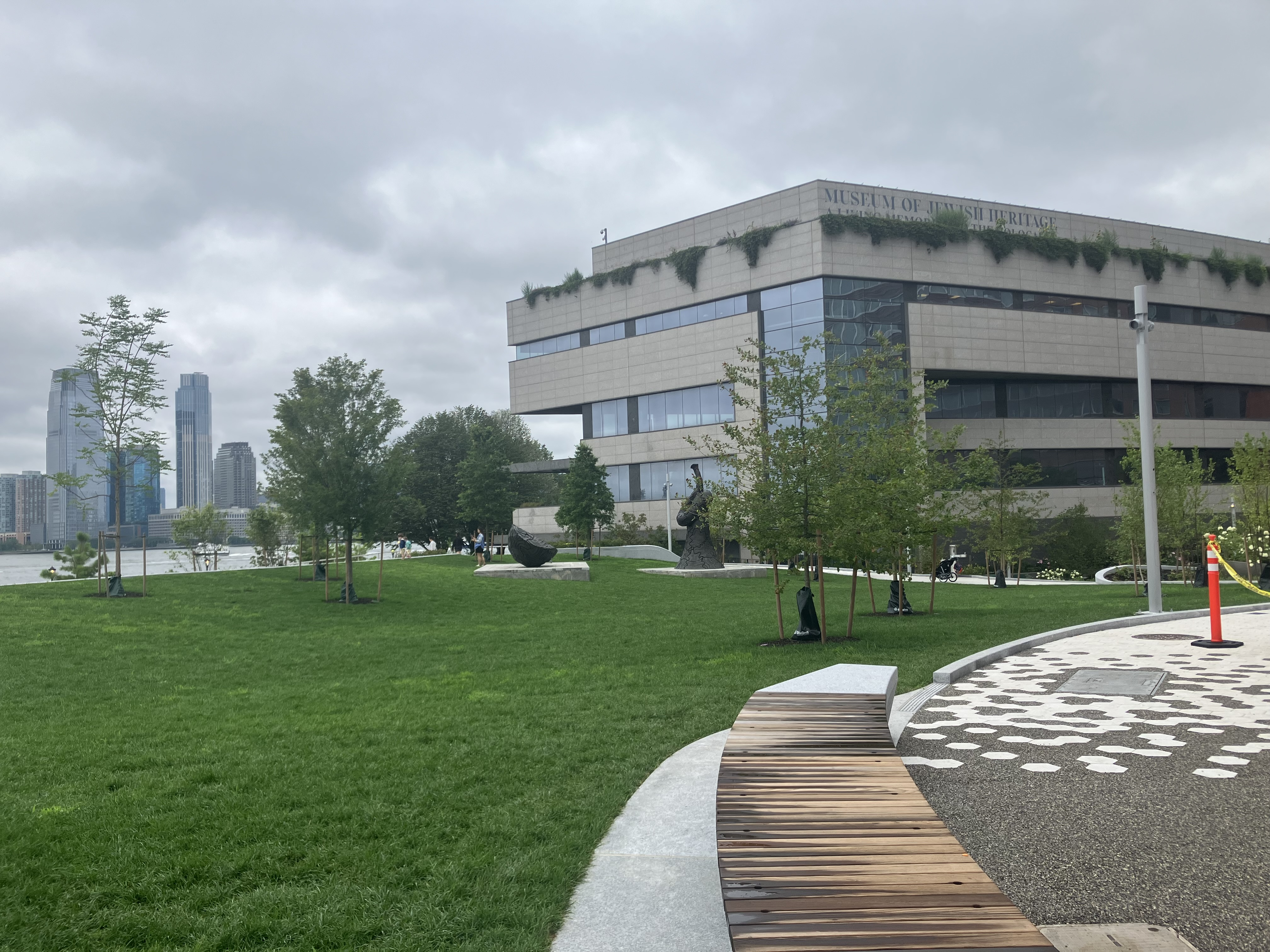
Resonating Bodies in Wagner Park in August 2025, with view towards the Museum of Jewish Heritage.

There are various works of public art in Battery Park City in New York City. The neighborhood is located adjacent to the Financial District and was built in the 1980s and 1990s, upon landfill deposited along the Hudson River following the construction of the World Trade Center. Battery Park City spans 92 acres (37 ha), about one-third of which is parkland and public open space. Temporary art exhibits, including Art on the Beach and Wheatfield — A Confrontation, took place on the landfill in the years before the neighborhood was developed.

Public art was incorporated as part of the neighborhood master plan and in developing the open spaces, including the South Cove and the North Cove waterfront plaza in front of Brookfield Place (then the World Financial Center). Additionally, artworks were placed at the end of many of the residential streets, where they meet the esplanade. There also are numerous sculptures in the neighborhood’s public parks.

== History ==
Up until the late 1960s, there was little public art on display in New York City, aside from large monuments. During Mayor John Lindsay's administration in the 1960s, a dedicated cultural office was created, led by Doris C. Freedman. When the city was unable to continue supporting the public art projects in the 1970s, due to fiscal crisis, some private and non-profit organizations stepped in to provide support for public art projects. These included the Public Art Fund, founded by Freedman in 1977, and Creative Time, which organized the Art on the Beach installations on the Battery Park City landfill. In 1982, the city enacted the Percent for Art law, committing a share of eligible capital projects to public artworks.

In the early 1980s, the Battery Park City Authority established a public art program with creation of a Fine Arts Committee. The committee included notable people in art and architecture, including Michael Graves, art historians Linda Nochlin and Robert Rosenblum, Barbara Haskell, curator of the Whitney Museum and Linda Shearer, curator at the Museum of Modern Art. The program was modeled on the Percent for Art programs in other cities. Artists were selected to work alongside architects and landscape architects to design public spaces, and various artworks were commissioned in the late 1980s and 1990s. The public art was intended to help draw tourists, as well as make the neighborhood more attractive for residents and office workers.

In 2019, the Battery Park City Authority compiled an inventory and had Art Dealers Association of America conduct an appraisal of its public art collection. This was undertaken after concerns about long-term stewardship and costs of maintaining the artwork. Altogether, 15 artworks in Battery Park City were appraised at US$63,500,000.

=== Resiliency Project impacts ===
Following Hurricane Sandy in 2012, which flooded many parts of lower Manhattan including some sections of Battery Park City, there was increased interest in developing coastal resiliency measures to protect against future storms and sea level rise. The Lower Manhattan Coastal Resiliency plans have been formed, which include the South Battery Park City Resiliency Project and the Northwest Battery Park City Resiliency Project. This involved reconstruction of Wagner Park at the southern end of Battery Park City, from early 2023 until summer of 2025, as part of the South Battery Park City Resiliency Project. During reconstruction of Wagner Park, the various sculptures in the park were temporary relocated and have since returned to the park.

The second phase of the resiliency work in Battery Park City is the Northwest Battery Park City Resiliency Project. Construction is set to start in late 2025, with site preparation work, and the project is planned to be completed in 2031. The project involves reconstruction of the North Cove area around Brookfield Place, as well as installation of flood walls and deployable gates along the Battery Park City Esplanade and around the perimeter of South Cove. As a result, it involved decommissioning the Upper Room artwork at the end of Albany Street, and removal of works by Scott Burton around Brookfield Place.

== North Cove at Brookfield Place ==
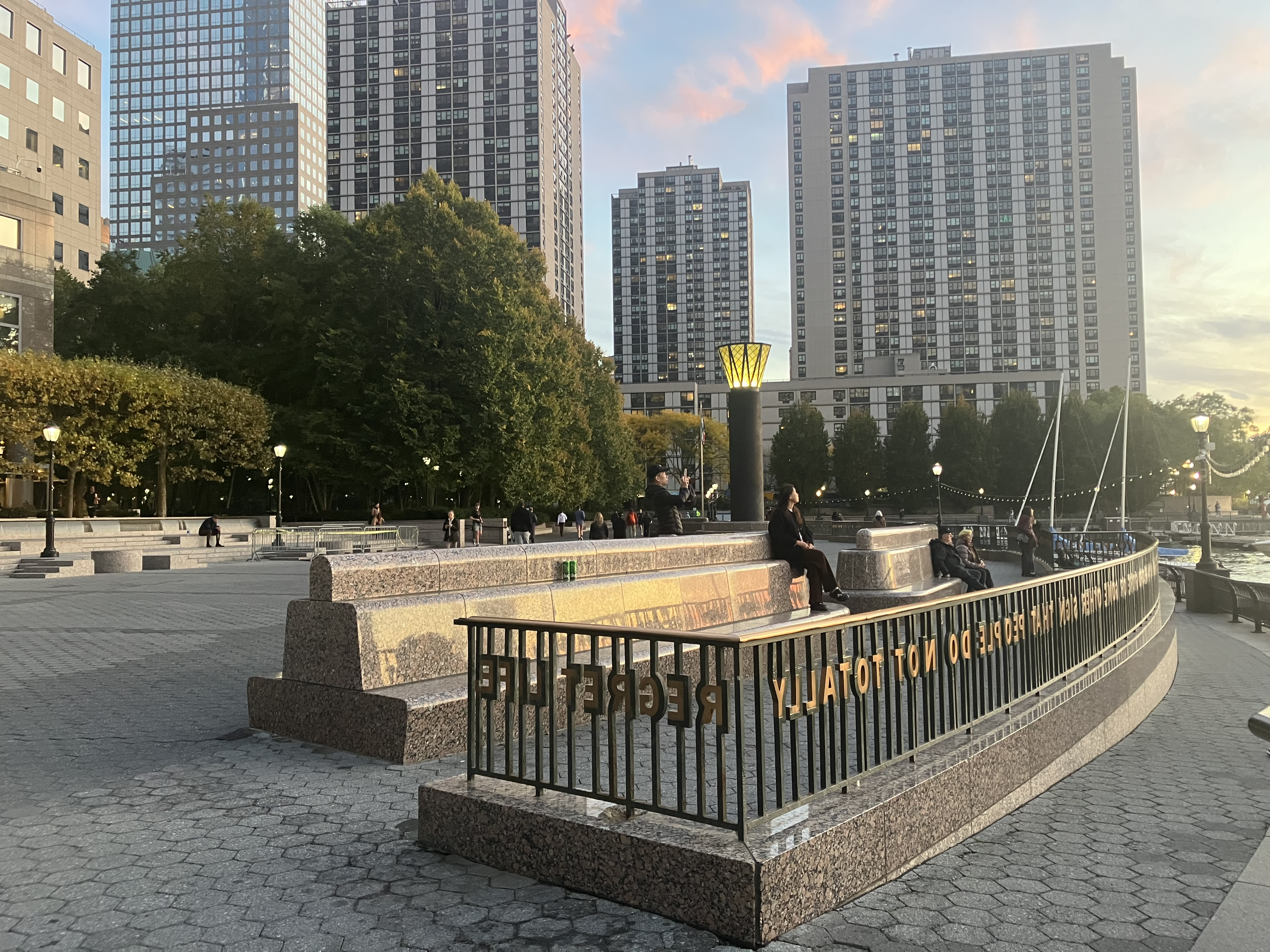
Waterfront Plaza at Brookfield Place

César Pelli, architect of Brookfield Place, selected artists Siah Armajani and Scott Burton and landscape architect M. Paul Friedberg to design the 3.5-acre (1.4 ha) waterfront plaza. The plaza has upper and lower levels separated by two granite reflecting pools with fountains, each about 150 ft (46 m) long. The plaza surrounds North Cove Marina, a small yacht harbor.

As part of the waterfront plaza, Burton designed a series of tripartite seating units—each consisting of a circular element flanked by two three-step stairs, situated in front of the fountains. He also designed four long granite benches that are located along the edge of the water.

Siah Armajani created the fence railings along the North Cove, in front of Brookfield Place. Excerpts from poetry are spelled out with bronze letters along the railings, including from Walt Whitman’s City of Ships, from Leaves of Grass, and from Frank O’Hara’s Meditations in an Emergency.

On the upper level, off to the side, is Pumphouse Park which has a wooded area with walking paths, along with a round grassy area surrounded by a walking path. Armajani designed the gate at the entrance to this park from Liberty Street and South End Avenue. The gate is made of metal with tall trellis-like structures.

As part of the Northwest Battery Park City Resiliency project, Burton’s geometric shapes and steps are being removed and will be put into storage. They will return to Battery Park City once the resiliency project is complete, though not in the same location. The Battery Park City Authority is considering placing them at the end of Albany Street, next to the Esplanade. The torch in the Waterfront Plaza, as well as the railings and granite benches will be temporarily removed and returned to the plaza in front of Brookfield Place when the resiliency project is completed, and Armajani‘s gate at Pumphouse Park will also be preserved.

=== Pylons ===
Pylons (1995), by Martin Puryear, are two obelisk-shaped sculptures located near Brookfield Place, at Belvedere Plaza and next to the Battery Park City ferry terminal and the North Cove. They are constructed with stainless steel, one with a steel mesh basket-like appearance and the other covered in granite. Both pylons have six segments, stacked upon one another, and are illuminated at night. Pylons will be preserved in the reconstruction of the North Cove and Belvedere Plaza, which is occurring as part of the Northwest Battery Park Resiliency Project.

== South Cove ==
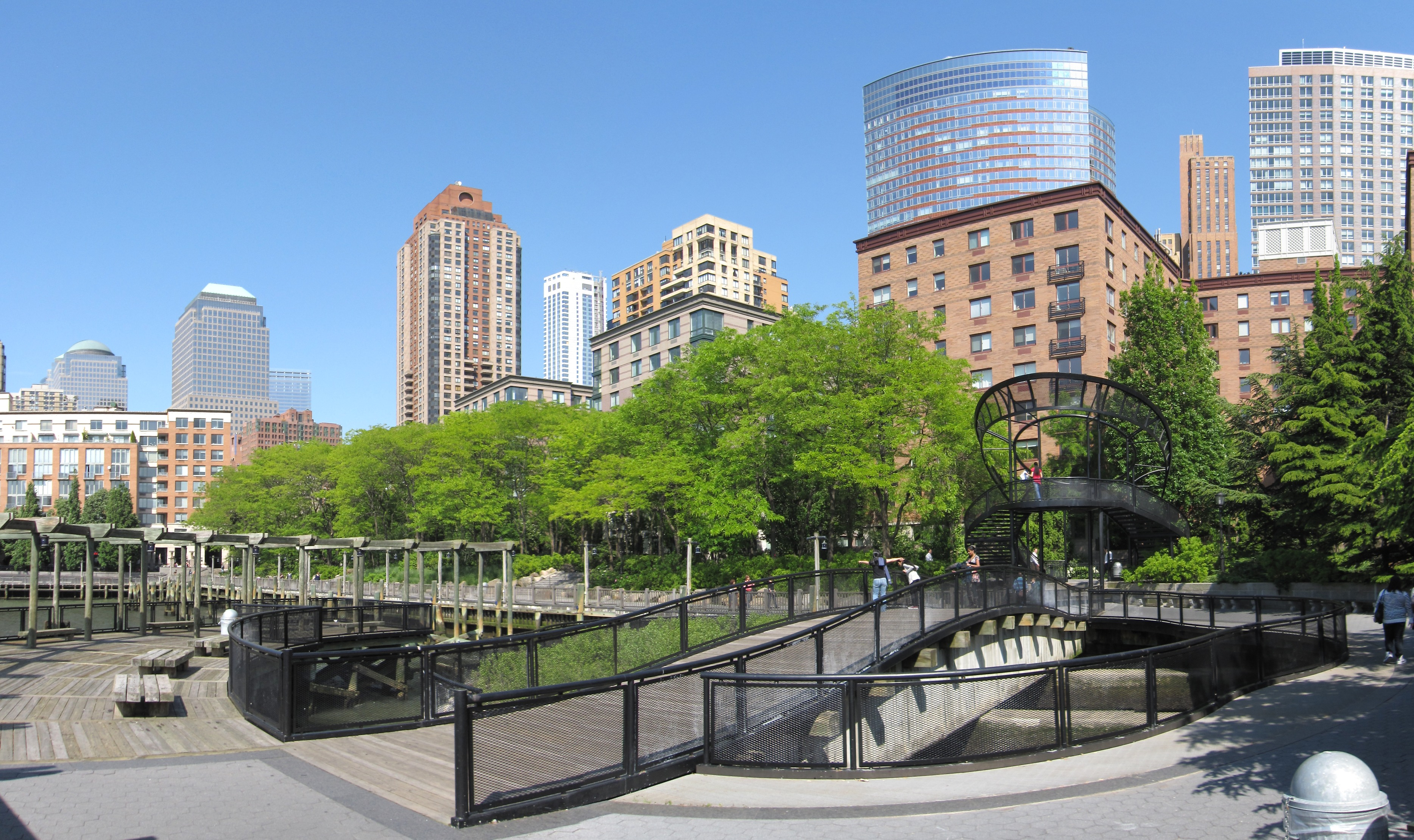
South Cove in Battery Park City

South Cove is a 3.5-acre (1.4 ha) waterfront park area at the southern end of Battery Park City, located at the southern end of the Battery Park City Esplanade and just to the north of Wagner Park.

The main feature of South Cove is a wooden semi-circular jetty and pergola with benches. There is a bridge connecting it, over a small island, to a lower level wooden boardwalk and a steel lookout tower, with a pair of circular staircases to get to the observation level. There is another semi-circle walkway also connecting the jetty with the lookout tower, with a concrete surface and a historic marker for the September 11 attacks.

Along the east side of the South Cove, there is a lower boardwalk walkway, lined with blue harbor lights and scattered with some boulders. On the north side of the cove, there is another wooden boardwalk with benches, extending out over the water, and a ramp that connects the South Cove with the esplanade. At the top of the ramp, there is a pergola structure, marking the end of the esplanade. There are timber pilings that remain in the water in the South Cove. The upper section of the park has several curvilinear paths and walkways, include some that pass through a small grove of honey locust trees. Other plants, suitable for a coastal environment and tolerant to salt water and wind, were used around the South Cove including beach grass, beach rose, bayberry and beach plum.

The park was designed through a collaboration between artist Mary Miss, landscape architect Susan Child and architect Stanton Eckstut. Mary Miss was able to discourage ideas to continue the esplanade at the South Cove, as well as having a marina at the South Cove. Construction of the park was completed in 1987, at a cost of $13 million, and it was dedicated in July 1988. Mary Miss wanted the South Cove area to be close to the water, as at the time, it was generally difficult for people in New York City to access the water.

In 2018–2019, the Battery Park City Authority conducted repairs on the pergola and pedestrian bridge at South Cove, replacing deteriorated timber piles and deck boards.

Beginning in 2026, the Northwest Battery Park Resiliency Project will commence in perimeter areas of the South Cove, including on the north side and along the Esplanade to the north of South Cove. The main parts of the South Cove and the Honey Locust grove are out of scope of the resiliency project and will be unaffected, however a new wall will be constructed on the northern side of South Cove, between the lower and upper levels and the small wooden pergola at the end of the Esplanade will be removed.

== Other public artwork ==
=== Rector Gate ===
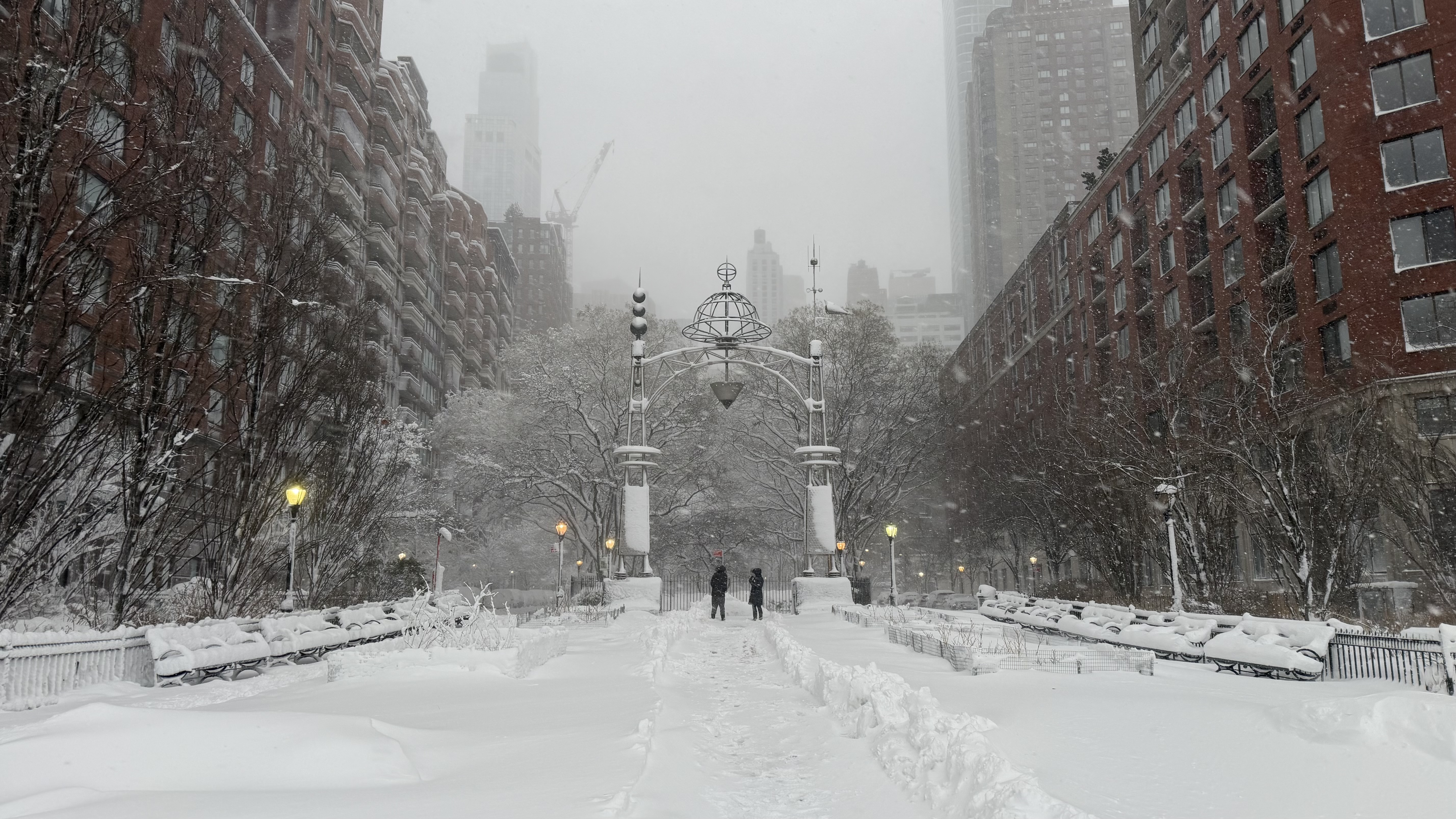
Rector Gate, during a blizzard in February 2026

Rector Gate (1989), by R.M. Fischer, is a 45-foot tall stainless steel and bronze arch at the entrance to the esplanade from Rector Place and Rector Park. Fischer was commissioned in 1985 by Battery Park City Authority to create the artwork, which was completed in 1989. Fischer aspired for it to be “larger than life” and “fanciful”, and compliment the scale of the surrounding buildings. Fischer incorporates nautical elements into the design, and atop the arch, there is a dome shape structure that mimics design elements with the Winter Garden at Brookfield Place. There also is some seating space at the base of the gate, with the artist intending the gate to also serve as a meeting place. At night, the gate emits a glow to illuminate it.

=== Berlin Wall ===
Two original slabs of the Berlin Wall are located in Kowsky Plaza, next to the Gateway Plaza apartment buildings and the North Cove, in Battery Park City. The slabs were part of the inner wall and originally located between Potsdamer Platz and Leipziger Platz in Berlin. Thierry Noir painted these particular remnant slabs of the Berlin Wall in 1997. In November 2004, the City of Berlin donated this piece of the Berlin Wall to Battery Park City.

As part of the Northwest Battery Park City Resiliency Project, the Battery Park City Authority plans to temporarily remove the Berlin Wall slabs for restoration and return them to Kowsky Plaza upon completion the project in 2031.

=== The Real World ===
The Real World (1992), by Tom Otterness, is a collection of cast-bronze sculptures located in Rockefeller Park in a playground setting. It depicts cartoon-like human figures and animals in various scenes, including a “creeping cat”, “miniature figures playing chess” and an “island built on a mound of bronze pennies and teeming with ankle-high creatures”. The Real World sculptures will be protected in place while flood walls are being built as part of the Northwest Battery Park Resiliency Project.

=== Ape & Cat (at the Dance) ===
Ape & Cat (at the Dance) (1993), by Jim Dine, is a cast-bronze sculpture located in Wagner Park, in Battery Park City. It was depicts an ape and cat in an embracing dance, and was inspired by a small 19th-century ceramic figurine that Dine found in London. The sculpture includes a base that Dine added later. After construction of the nearby Museum of Jewish Heritage, a portion of the sculpture base, thought to resemble “railroad ties”, was buried into the ground. Dine objected to this alteration, saying “That's outrageous,” and “By burying a part of my piece of art, they're defacing it. They bought it from me, does that give them the right to destroy it?” During reconstruction of Wagner Park, as part of the South Battery Park City Resiliency Project, the sculpture was relocated to Rector Park East.

=== Eyes ===
Eyes (1995), by Louise Bourgeois, is a set of black granite sculptures depicting a pair of eyes. Each eye is one meter high and is situated so that they are looking out towards the Statue of Liberty from Wagner Park. There is another larger instance of the Eyes sculpture in Tjuvholmen Sculpture Park in Oslo, Norway.

=== Justice Reflected ===
Justice Reflected, by James Yaya Hough, is a triptych of circular stained-glass and mosaic panels, measuring five feet tall, installed on a curved granite wall, next to Kowsky Plaza and on the south side of the North Cove. The work, supported by the Art for Justice Fund, was installed in November 2022 as a temporary exhibit and was later added to the Battery Park City Authority’s permanent collection in 2025. The glass panels depict themes and experiences related to incarceration and injustice. Hough was serving a life sentence without parole for a murder, committed when he was 17 years old. He was released in 2019, after a 2012 United States Supreme Court decision ruling it unconstitutional to give life sentences to juveniles. While serving his sentence, Hough spent time developing his art skills. Justice Reflected will be preserved during reconstruction of the North Cove and Esplanade, as part of the Northwest Battery Park City Resiliency Project.

=== Memorials ===
- Irish Hunger Memorial, adjacent to Brookfield Place, Belvedere Plaza and the ferry terminal.
- Mother Cabrini Memorial, created by Jill and Giancarlo Biagi, is located in the southern part of Battery Park City between the South Cove and Wagner Park.
- NYC Police Memorial, on the south side of the North Cove
- Hurricane Maria Memorial, located at the end of Chambers Street, next to Rockefeller Park, was created in 2021 by Antonio Martorell and architect Segundo Cardona.

=== Other public art ===
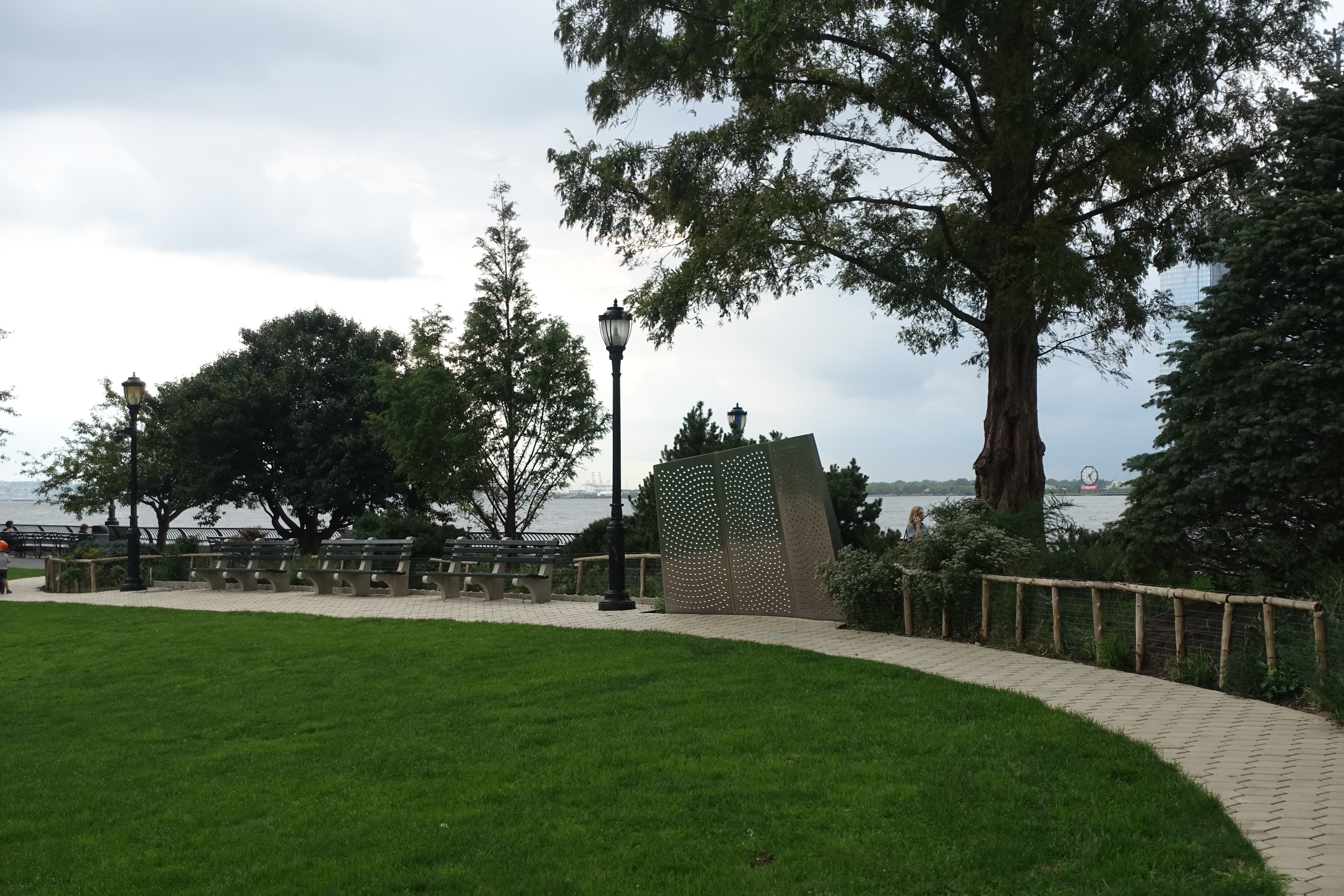
Sunrise, Sunset (Revolution) in Rockefeller Park

- Pavilion (1992), by Demetri Porphyrios, is an open-air structure located in the upper terrace section of Rockefeller Park. It features Doric style brick columns and a flat, square wooden roof.
- Resonating Bodies (1996), by Tony Cragg, are a pair of bronze sculptures, one which resembles a lute and the other a tuba. The sculptures are located in Wagner Park.
- Ulysses (1997), by Ugo Attardi, is a bronze figure located along the Battery Park City Esplanade at the western edge of Rockefeller Park. The figure was sculpted in a modern baroque style, with a helmet and mask.
- Sitting Stance (1998), by Richard Artschwager, consists of ensemble of sculptures, located in the cul-de-sac at the western end of West Thames Street, adjacent to the Battery Park City Esplanade. It includes a short street lamp encircled by a granite circular bench and table, a granite “throne” and a pair of wooden slatted deck chairs. Sitting Stance artwork will be temporarily removed for the duration of the Northwest Battery Park City Resiliency Project and returned to the end of West Thames Street once construction is completed.
- Sunrise, Sunset (Revolution), by Autumn Ewalt and Dharmesh Patel, consist of nine triptychs created with aluminum panels and crystal prisms. From 2017–2019, the artwork was on display at Pier A Plaza in Battery Park and then was relocated to Rockefeller Park in Battery Park City.

== Past public art ==
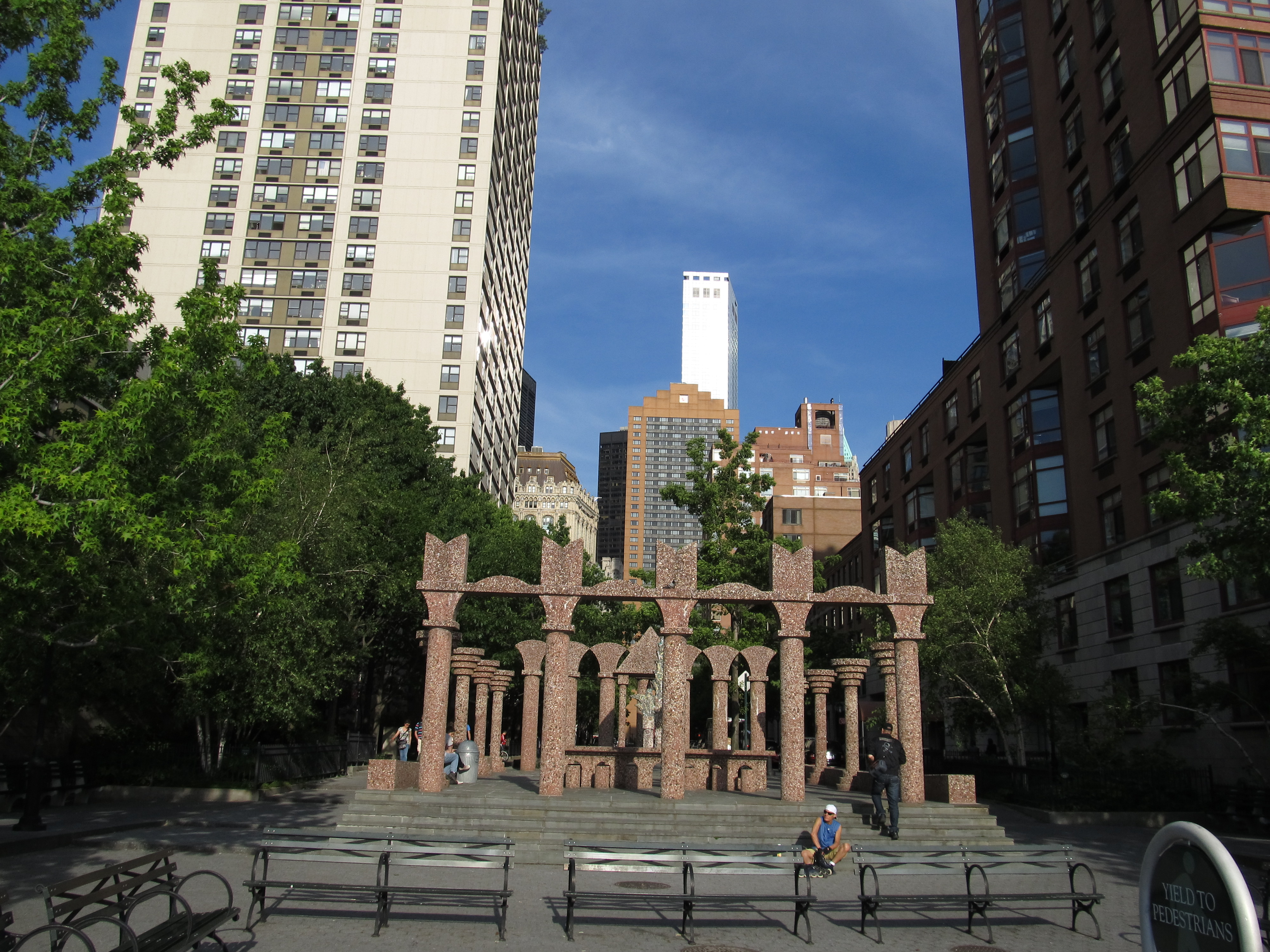
The Upper Room, located at Albany Street entrance to the Battery Park City Esplanade

=== 1970s–1980s ===
Debris and landfill from the construction of the World Trade Center was deposited in adjacent areas along the Hudson River in the late 1960s and early 1970s. In the 1970s, New York State faced a financial crisis and bankruptcy, thus delaying any plans to develop the new land. Up until 1985, Creative Time and other organizations sponsored temporary art exhibitions on the landfill including Art on the Beach.

- Battery Park Landfill (1973), by Mary Miss, consisted of five rectangular wooden flats, each measuring 5 1/2 ft tall and 12 ft wide, with a large circular cut out.
- Art on the Beach (1978), organized by Creative Time, was a temporary art installation in Battery Park City in August–September 1978, featuring works by various artists.
- Art on the Beach 2 (1980) was a temporary art installation and sequel to the 1978 exhibition, located in Battery Park City in the summer of 1980.
- Wheatfield, a Confrontation (1982), by Agnes Denes, was a 2.2-acre wheat field planted from May 1 until August 16, 1982, on the landfill where Battery Park City was to be built. The project was funded by the Public Art Fund as part of their Urban Environmental Site Program. For the project, 200 truckloads of topsoil were brought in and 285 hand-furrowed rows dug for planting the wheat. Over 1000 lbs of wheat were harvested, and distributed across 28 cities as part of the International Art Show for the End of World Hunger. Seed packets were also handed out to visitors at each stop of the art show. Straw was given to the New York City Police Department for its mounted police horses. Denes framed the work as a deliberate juxtaposition of agriculture and high finance, calling into question the economic priorities compared to social–environmental concerns.

=== Upper Room ===
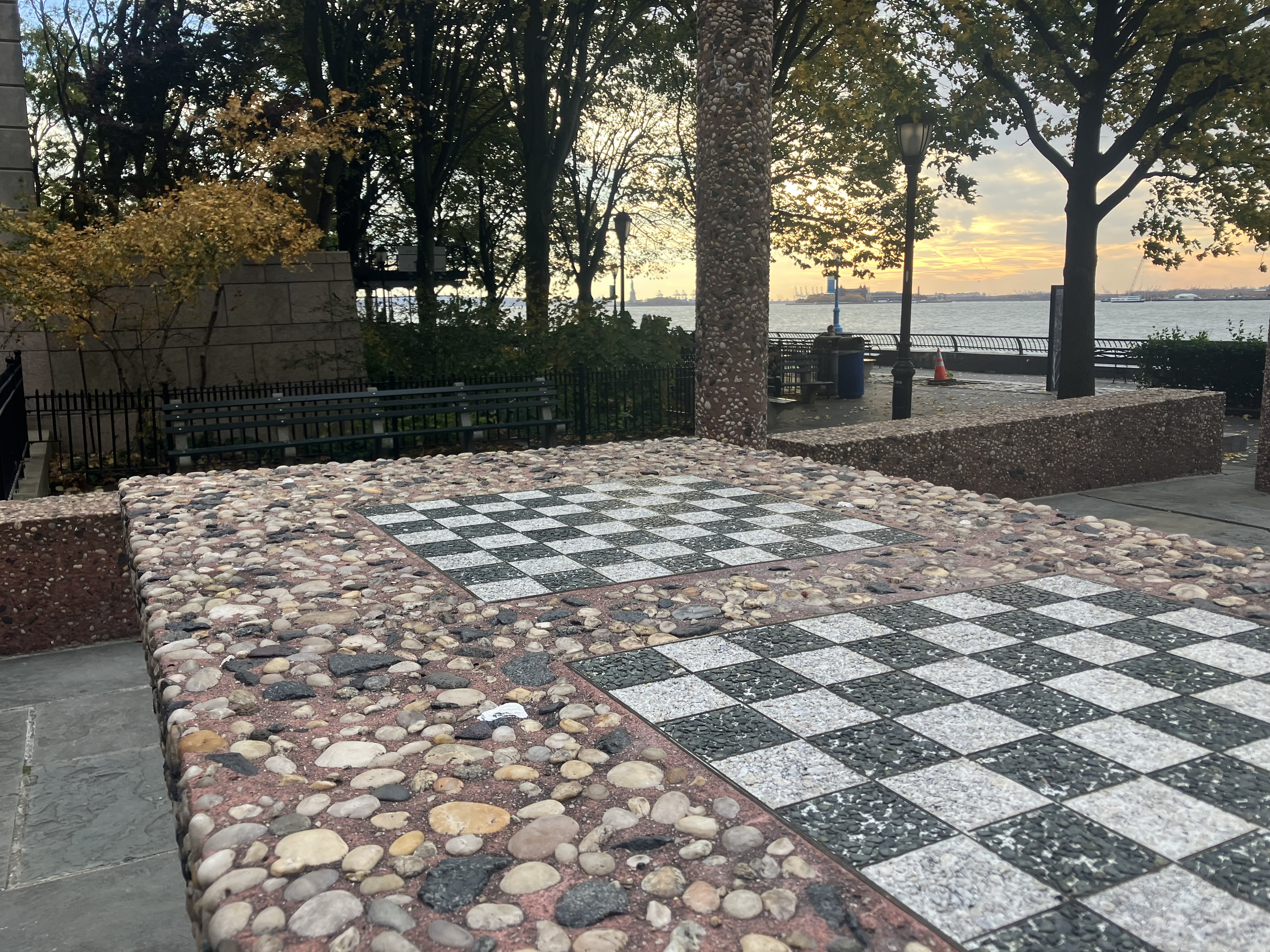
Elongated table in the Upper Room open-air plaza, with chess boards.

Upper Room (1987), by Ned Smyth, was a raised colonnaded court and open-air plaza, located at the western end of Albany Street at the entrance to the esplanade, overlooking the Hudson River. It resembled an ancient temple, with inspiration from architecture of Ancient Egypt, Ancient Greece and Ancient Rome. Inside the 75-by-40-foot (23 m × 12 m) plaza, there was a concrete table with six chess boards, and twelve stools. There was also a small temple-like structure inside the plaza, with glass and stone mosaics and a pyramid-shaped roof. The plaza was surrounded by columns, made of gravelly concrete aggregate, with some resembling palm trees.

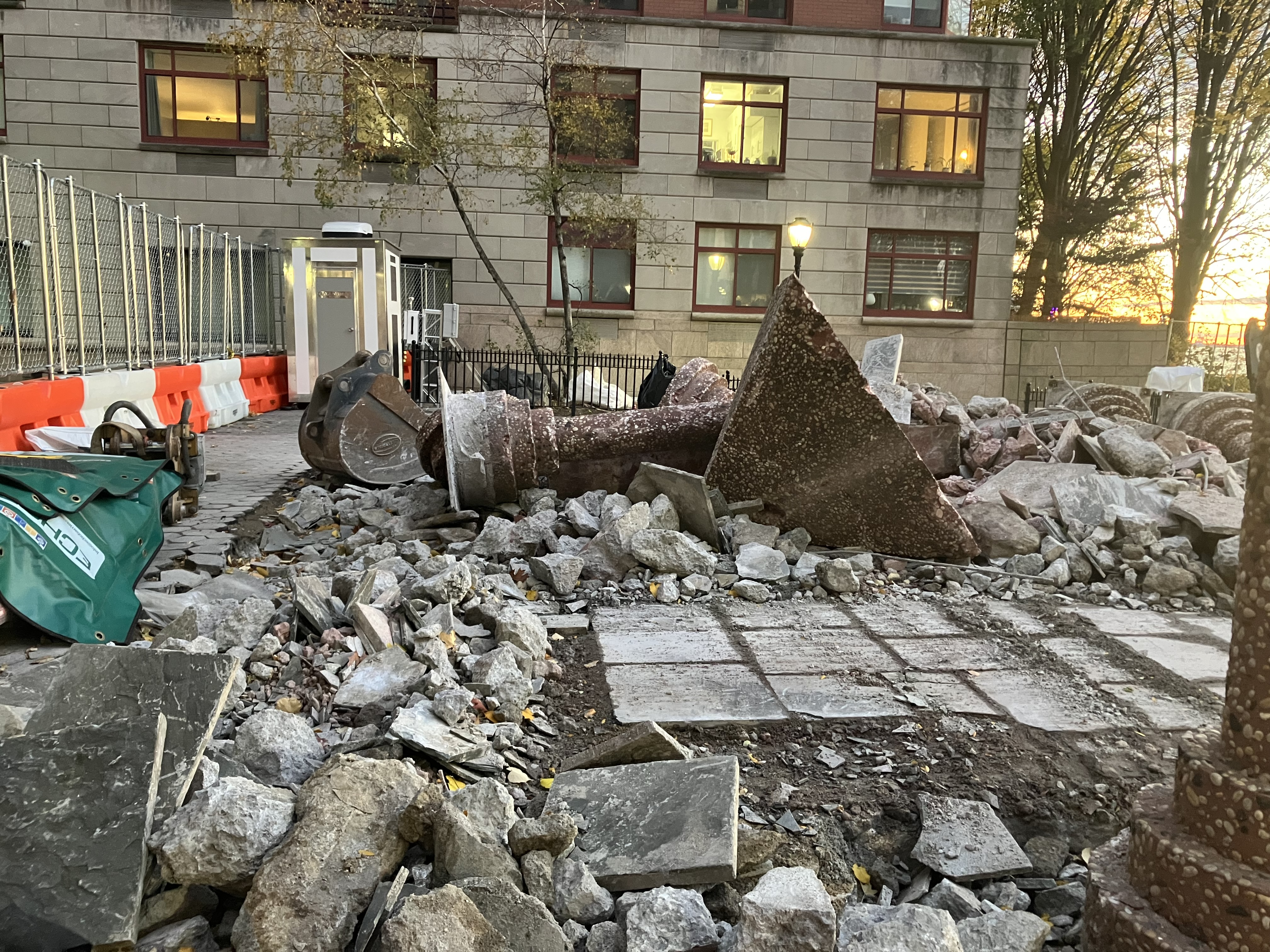
Demolition of the Upper Room, as of November 13, 2025. Demolition started the previous day.

The Upper Room was commissioned by the Battery Park City Authority in 1987. Smyth spent part of his childhood in Italy, and his father was an art historian. His art incorporated pattern and decorative elements.

The Upper Room was an important outdoor community gathering space during the COVID-19 pandemic in 2020, and over the years, a popular place for birthday parties and other social gatherings.

In 2024, the Battery Park City Authority announced that the Upper Room would need to be demolished in order to allow installation of flood gates as part of the Northwest Battery Park City Resiliency Project, and that there was no feasible option to relocate the artwork. The columns of the Upper Room were developing cracks, according to an art conservator who was hired 6 years prior to assess the condition of the artwork, but she believes the artwork could have been saved. The Manhattan Community Board 1 also “urged the Authority to explore every possible option to preserve the work”. Removal of the Upper Room occurred in November 2025.

=== 1990s–current ===
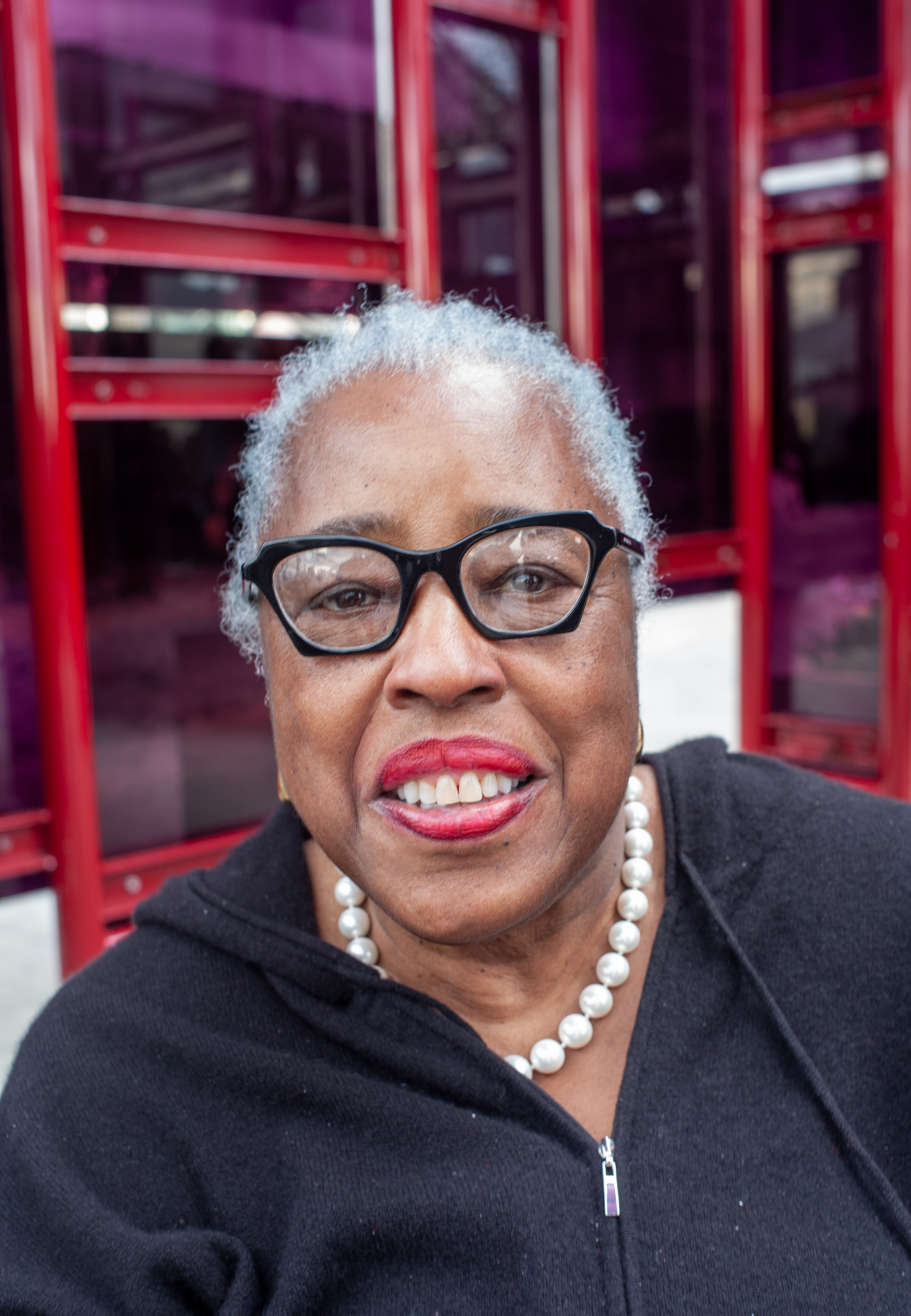
Mildred Howard inside her sculpture The House That Will Not Pass for Any Color Than Its Own in 2022

- Modern Head (1991–1992; 1996–2001) by Roy Lichtenstein, was one of five 31-foot tall steel sculptures on temporary display in Battery Park City, at the South End Avenue cul-de-sac at Liberty Street, next to Brookfield Place. It was on display again from 1996 until 2001, surviving the September 11 attacks from a block away. It was since acquired by the Smithsonian and is on display outside the Smithsonian American Art Museum in Washington, D.C.
- The Welcoming Hands (1996), by Louise Bourgeois, was a set of six bronze sculptures on a granite base. The sculptures resembled clasped hands and “a single baby’s hand”, and were created as a memorial for immigrants. It was located at the southern end of the neighborhood, overlooking New York Harbor and across from the Statue of Liberty. Situatied across the harbor from the Statue of Liberty, it was intended to welcome newcomers to the country. When the Museum of Jewish Heritage was built, the Battery Park City Authority, made the decision to relocate the artwork to less visible location, due to concerns about offending Holocaust survivors who visit the museum and that the hands could resemble “severed body parts from the death camps”.
- Blessing of the Boats: River to River (2020), by Muna Malik, was a temporary, participatory installation at Belvedere Plaza in Battery Park City, presented with the Lower Manhattan Cultural Council as part of the River To River 2020: Four Voices festival in August 2020. The work featured 20 foot mirrored-acrylic, origami-style boat. Visitors were invited to fold paper boats, inscribe responses to the prompt “ We have an opportunity to set sail toward a new future; what society would you build and how do we get there?”, and place the paper inside the boat. The art installation was on display again in 2021 at the LMCC Arts Center on Governors Island.
- The House That Will Not Pass for any Color than its Own (2020–2022), by Mildred Howard, was a temporary art installation located in Belvedere Plaza near Brookfield Place. It was an open-air purple laminated glass house with a red steel frame, and was situated so that the Statue of Liberty was in view from the house. It was commissioned in 2011 by the Sacramento County Department of Airports.

== See also ==
- List of public art in Manhattan
