= Tjuvholmen =

Neighborhood in Oslo

Coordinates: 59.9071°N 10.7220°E

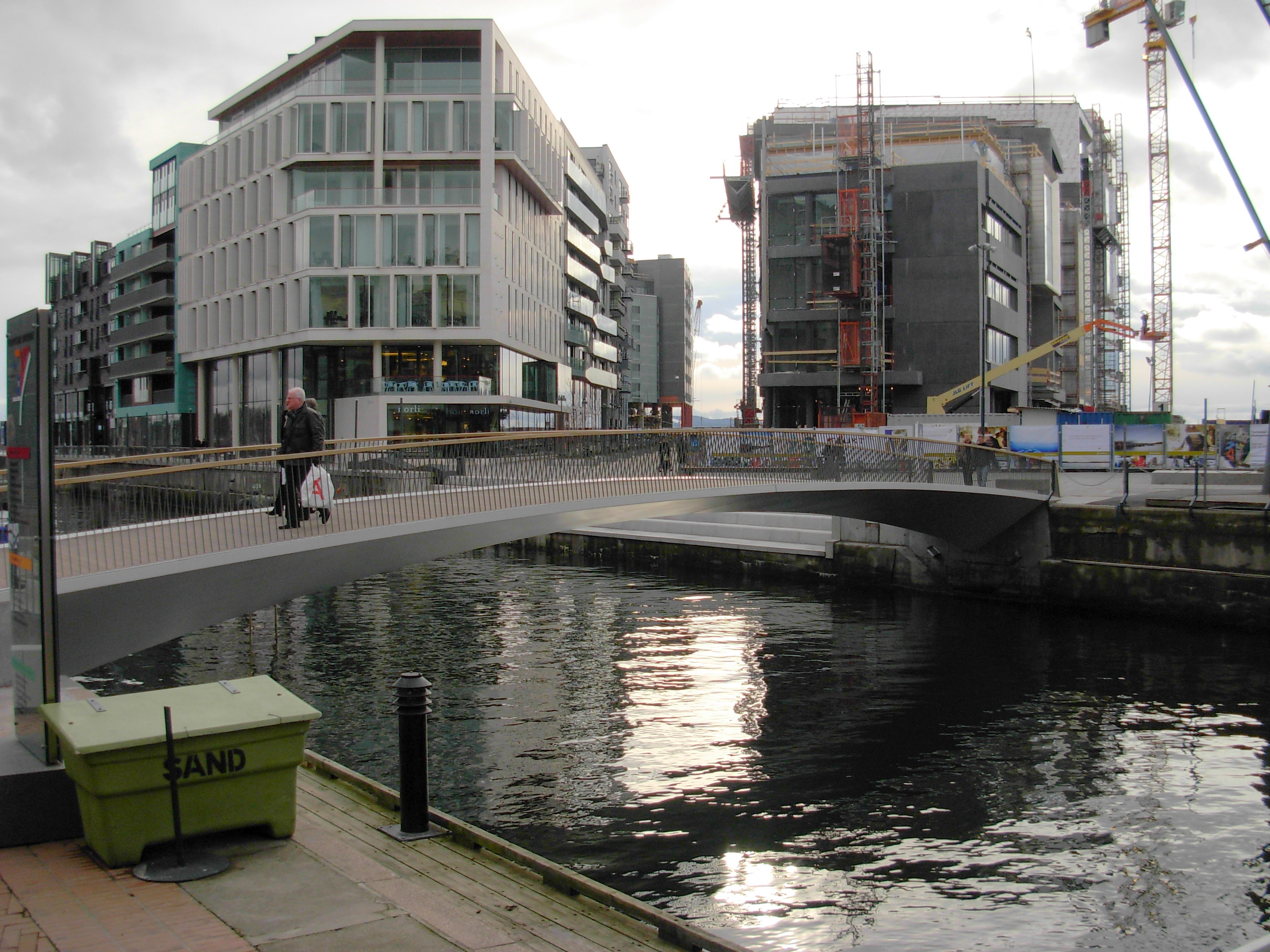
Tjuvholmen as seen from Aker Brygge

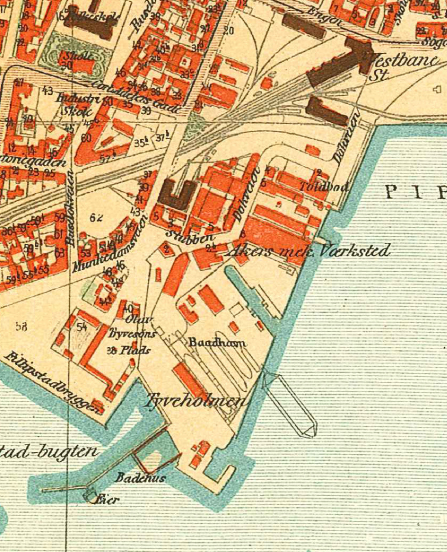
Map of Tjuvholmen and Aker Brygge from 1917

Tjuvholmen is a neighborhood in the borough Majorstuen in Oslo, Norway. It is located on a peninsula sticking out from Aker Brygge into the Oslofjord. It is located east of Filipstad and south of Vika. At the tip of the peninsula, next to the sculpture park, is an outdoor bathing area. The water leads out to the Inner Oslofjord.

The area was bought by the shipyard Akers Mekaniske Verksted in the mid 19th century, who planned to build a drydock there. Instead, it was bought by the municipality in 1914, and transferred to the port authority in 1919. They built docks and artificial land, increasing the area from 5 to 33 hectares (12 to 82 acres). From the 1960s, Fred. Olsen & Co. rented the docks, and from 1971 Nylands Mekaniske Verkstad had a shipyard on the spot. Since 1982, the area has been used for office space, terminals, and warehouses. The Norwegian National Academy of Ballet was located there.

Since 2005, the area has been sold to private developers, who are conducting an urban renewal with housing. The area has about 1,200 apartments since 2012. It is part of the Fjord City urban renewal program. This program has seen the opening of several art galleries, amongst them the Astrup Fearnley Museum of Modern Art and the Gallery Haaken. Tjuvholmen skulpturpark, next to the museum, was created by Renzo Piano.

== Geology ==
The geology of the former islet is of great interest. The German geologist Leopold von Buch visited the area in 1806–07, and he then discovered and described rhomb porphyry for the first time.

== The name ==
The first element is tjuv (thief), the last element is the finite form of holme (islet). The islet was later turned into a peninsula because of post-glacial rebound. Thieves were executed here in the 18th century. An older (Danish) spelling of the name was "Tyveholmen".
