= George Peck (artist) =

American painter

- Born: 1941 (age 84–85); Budapest, Hungary
- Education: City College of New York (1964-1966); Hunter College(1966-1967)
- Spouse: Mary Miss
- Website: www.georgepeck.net

George Peck (born 1941) is a New York-based visual artist. Born in Hungary, his work has appeared in exhibitions across the United States and Europe, and his work is represented in such museums as The Metropolitan Museum of Art, and Brooklyn Museum of Art in New York City, High Museum of Art in Atlanta, The Museum of Fine Arts Budapest, Kiscelli Museum in Budapest, and Museum of Modern Art in Sweden.

== Early life and education ==
Peck was born in Budapest, Hungary; he attended City College of New York, studied Interaction of Color with Josef Albers, and studied with Tony Smith, Ron Gorchov, and Doug Ohlson at Hunter College. He has been living in the United States since 1957.

== Notable work ==
Since the early part of his career in the 1970s, Peck has been known for his monochromatic paintings. He has a number of abstract paintings in the collections of museums around the world, including "California Painting" at Brooklyn Museum. His "Composite Pictures" (1994–95) combined the mediums of paint and collage, and appeared in New York and Budapest. His show "Layered Time, Layered Paint" appeared at Kiscelli Museum in Hungary in 2002. In 2005, Peck's exhibit Projected Paintings appeared at the Ernst Museum in Hungary.

=== Selected solo exhibitions ===
2013. DREAMSTATE Humboldt University, Berlin, Germany

2009. Ladies and Gentlemen… Little Synagogue Gallery, Eger, Hungary

2005. Ernst Museum, Budapest, Hungary

2003. Florence Lynch Gallery, New York, NY

2002. Layered Time Layered Paint, (Selected Paintings Spanning Thirteen Years), Kiscelli Museum, Budapest, Hungary

2000. Varfok Gallery, Budapest, Hungary The Hungarian Academy of Fine Arts, Budapest, Hungary

1999. Kate Ganz Gallery USA, Ltd, New York, NY Trans Hudson Gallery, New York, NY

1998. Trans Hudson Gallery, New York, NY.

1997. Museum of Applied Arts, Budapest, Hungary.

1996. Trans Hudson Gallery, New York, NY.

1995. Kunsthalle (Mücsarnok), Budapest, Hungary. Törökfürdõ (Turkish Bath), Budapest, Hungary. Fine Arts Museum, Budapest, Hungary.

=== Selected group exhibitions ===
2018. Bridging Boundaries, Corcoran School of the Arts and Design, Washington, DC

2016. Debate Box, Manhattan Bridge, New York, NY

2016. GAMEclip, MODEM Centre for Modern and Contemporary Arts, Debrecen, Hungary

2016. Nature Art - Variations, Műcsarnok / Kunsthalle, Budapest, Hungary

2010. Dash Gallery, New York, NY

2010. Mediating the Message, La Maison Francaise, Columbia University, NY, NY

2009. Mélyvíz, Applied Arts Museum, Budapest, Hungary

2008. Random Utterness, Hungarian Cultural Center, New York, NY

2007. The Black Madonna, Birmingham Civil Rights Institute, Birmingham, AL

2003. Hunter College / Times Square Gallery,

Seeing Red, Part II: Contemporary Nonobjective Painting, New York, NY

2002. Color - A Mind Of Its Own, Kunsthalle (Mücsarnok), Budapest, Hungary

2001. Monochrome/ Monochrome?, Florence Lynch Gallery, New York, NY.

2000. Directions, Janos Gat Gallery, New York, NY.

1999. Acrylic/Plastic, Trans Hudson Gallery, New York, NY.

=== Selected public collections ===
Brooklyn Museum of Art; Brooklyn, New York.

Budapest Museum of Fine Arts; Budapest, Hungary.

Cincinnati Central Trust; Cincinnati, Ohio.

Kiscelli Museum, Municipal art collection, Budapest, Hungary

Grey Art Gallery, New York University; New York, NY.

High Museum of Art; Atlanta, Georgia.

Karl Ernst Osthaus Museum; Germany.

Metropolitan Museum of Art; New York, NY.

Moderna Museet; Stockholm, Sweden.

Museum of Applied Arts; Budapest, Hungary.

Best Products; Richmond, Virginia.

== Current projects ==
Peck met filmmaker Hugo Perez in 2005 when Peck was in Budapest for his exhibition of Projected Paintings at Ernst Museum and Perez was making a documentary film about Miklos Radnoti, a Hungarian poet who was murdered during the Holocaust. Together, Peck and Perez began a collaboration on the project BOOKBURN / Library of Books Burned, a multimedia installation dealing with the cultural phenomenon of burning books. From October 4 to December 3, 2018, BOOKBURN / Library of Books Burned appeared at the Museum of Jewish Heritage in Manhattan.

== Personal life ==
Peck is married to American artist Mary Miss. They reside in New York City, where Peck has a studio.
