= Mary Miss =

American environmental artist (born 1944)

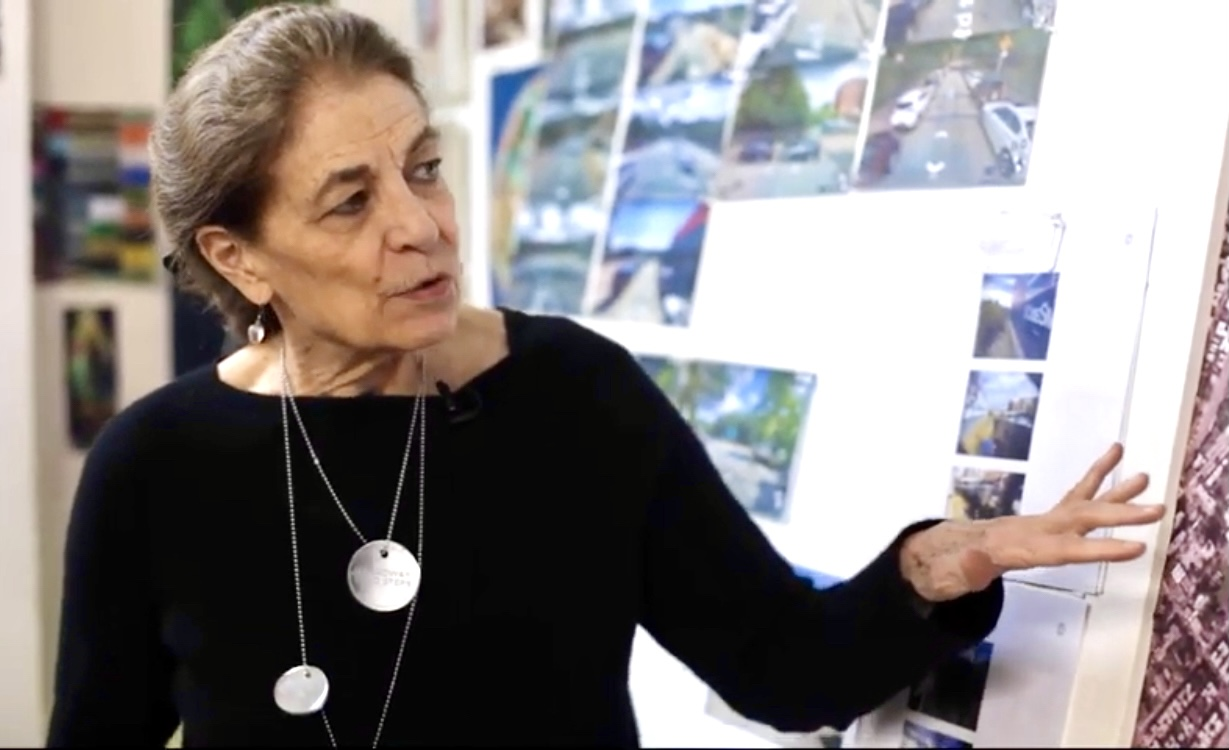
- Mary Miss in 2019
- Born: Mary M. Miss; May 27, 1944 (age 81); New York, New York, U.S.
- Education: University of California, Santa Barbara (B.A. 1966); Maryland Institute College of Art (M.F.A. 1968)
- Style: Environmental art
- Spouse(s): Bruce Colvin (m. 1967; div. 1986) George Peck
- Website: marymiss.com

Mary Miss (born May 27, 1944) is an American artist and designer. Her work has crossed boundaries between architecture, landscape architecture, engineering and urban design. Her installations are collaborative in nature: she has worked with scientists, historians, designers, and public administrators. She is primarily interested in how to engage the public in decoding their surrounding environment.

== Early life and education ==
Miss was born May 27, 1944, in New York City, but she spent her youth moving every year while living primarily in the western United States.

Miss studied art and received a B.A. from the University of California, Santa Barbara in 1966. Miss later received an M.F.A. from the Rhinehart School of Sculpture of Maryland Institute College of Art in 1968.

== Influence in public art ==
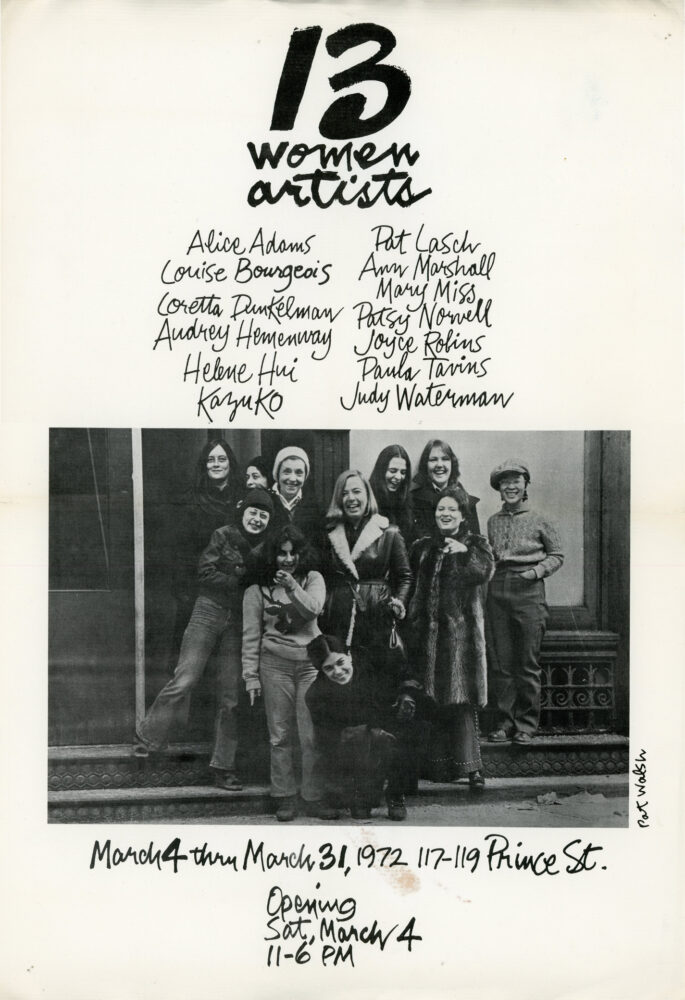
13 women 1972 exhibition poster, featuring Miss

As a public artist, Miss is considered a pioneer in environmental art and site-specific art, as well a leading sculptor during the feminist movement of the 1970s. She was a founding member of the journal Heresies. From her earliest work, she has been interested in bringing the specific attributes of a site into focus along with and audience engagement within public space. Miss’ work crosses boundaries between landscape architecture, architecture, urban design, and graphic communication. Her work creates situations that emphasize a site's history, ecology, or aspects of the environment that have gone unnoticed. She has been particularly interested in redefining the role of the artist in the public domain.

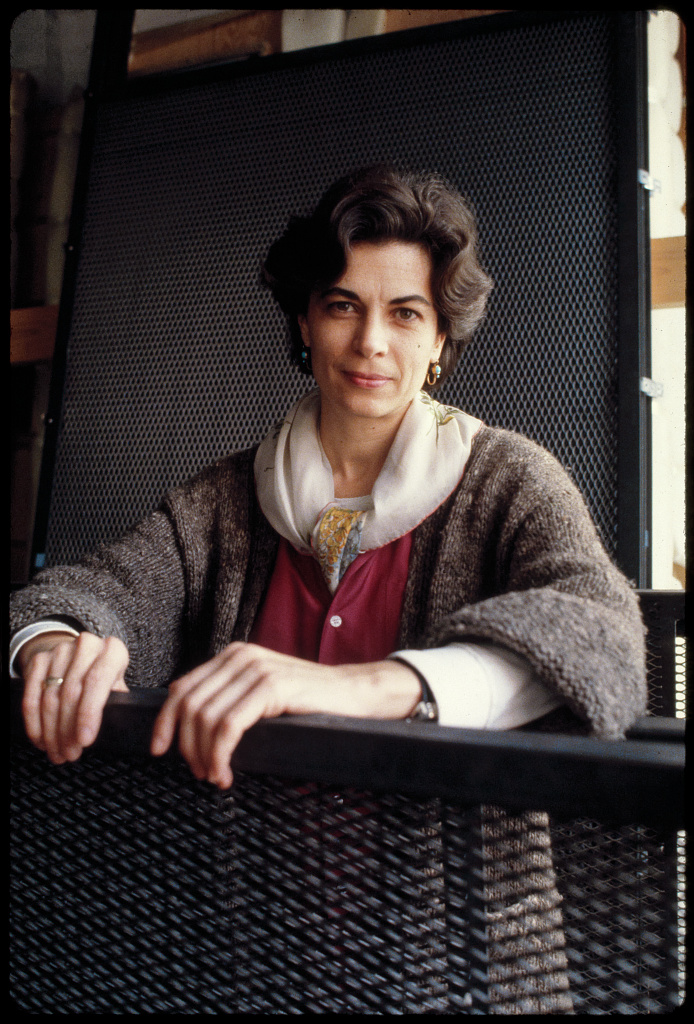
Miss in the mid-1970s

In her influential 1979 essay, Sculpture in the Expanded Field, art critic Rosalind Krauss opens with a description of Mary Miss's, Perimeters/Pavilions/Decoys. Krauss uses Miss's work to support her examination of sculpture's interdisciplinary nature between architecture and landscape. South Cove (1988), a permanent public project in Battery Park, is a seminal project in Miss' career as it signified new possibilities for artists working in the public realm. The project, located on a three-acre site at the base of the riverfront Esplande, was made in collaboration with architect Stanton Eckstut and landscape designer Susan Child. "South Cove brings the public more intimately in contact with the water than any other component of Battery park City or, indeed, any other Manhattan riverside park."

Miss has worked on the development of the project City as Living Laboratory, which, according to the project's description, collaborates with artists, environmental designers and scientists to focus on and explore sustainability in cities.

== Selected works ==
Battery Park Landfill (1973) installation was a temporary piece of five signboard-like structures, placed 50-feet apart across the landfill site. A series of large cut out circles descended into the ground describing a column of air that materialized only when the viewer stood with the boards aligned.

Untitled (1973) was created in April and May 1973 at the Allen Memorial Art Museum in Oberlin, Ohio, as part of the exhibition Four Young Americans (which also featured Ann McCoy, Ree Morton, and Jackie Winsor). This initial version of the work comprised wooden slats protruding directly along the sides of a square hole cut into the ground on the northeast lawn of the museum. The museum subsequently invited Miss to re-create the work using permanent materials—making this her first permanent commissioned work and her earliest extant public work. Constructed in the summer of 1975 under the artist's supervision, the second version was created with powder-coated steel slats protruding from tinted concrete, in its original siting.

Greenwood Pond: Double Site (1989–96), at the Des Moines Art Center in Iowa, is a 7.5-acre site developed as both an art installation and restoration site. It includes a demonstration wetland, outdoor classroom, overhanging walkways, a pavilion, and a curved trellis. The structures highlight the connection between land and water. Visual elements and images are interwoven throughout the site to reflect the history of the park and its surroundings. The work was deteriorated, and there were plans to dismantle in 2024. However, Miss alleged that the museum had breached its 1994 contract with her that stipulated they would plan to "preserve the work in perpetuity." Restoration costs were estimated to be $2.6 million. In May 2024, an Iowa judge issued a decision to block the demolition of Greenwood Pond: Double Site, ruling that the museum did not have the legal ability to dismantle the artwork without the artist agreeing, but also that the center wasn’t financially liable for restoring it to its original condition. In January 2025, a settlement was reached, resulting in the museum paying Miss a sum of $900,000 to move forward with the demolition.

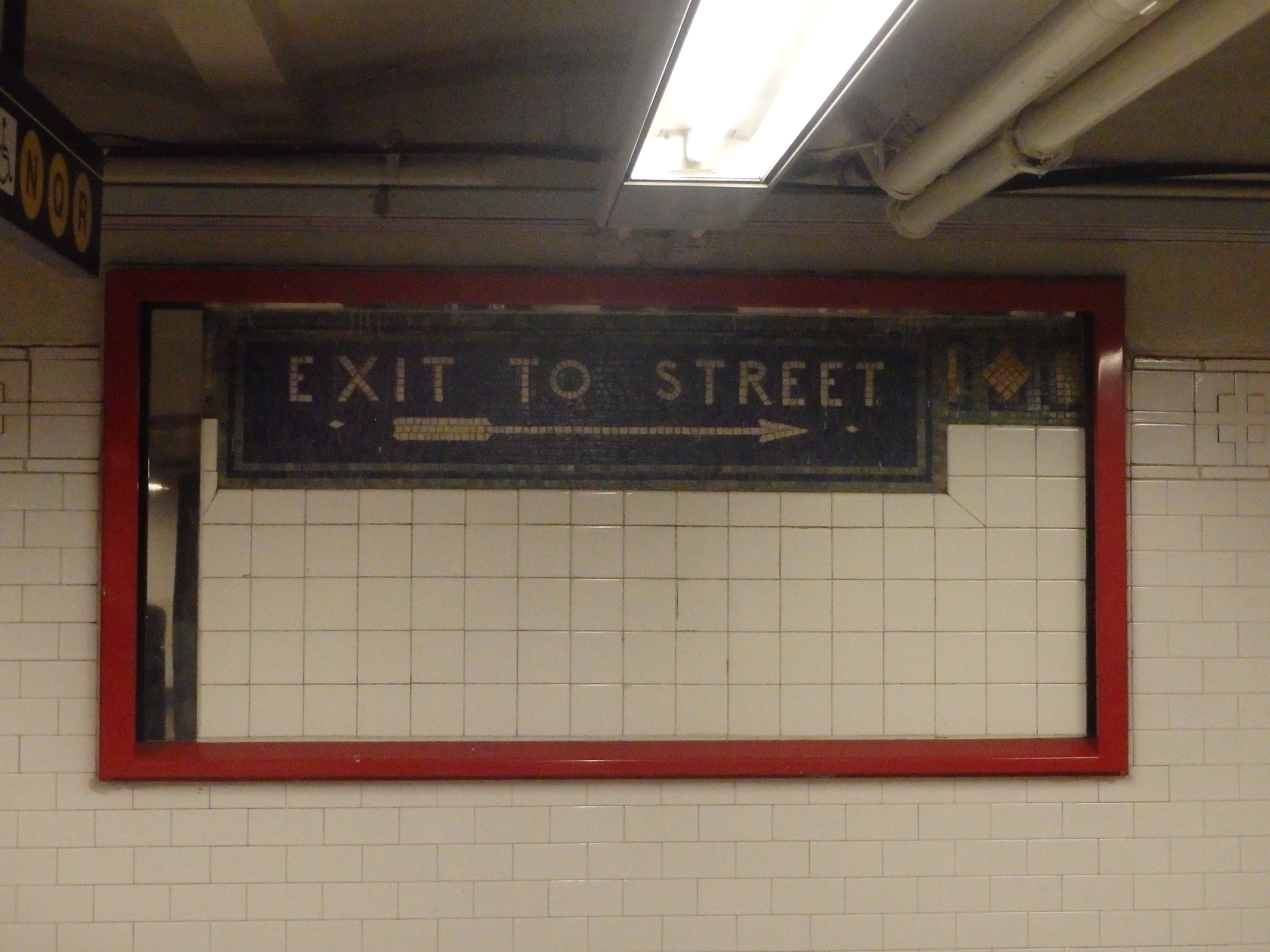
Framing Union Square, 14th Street Subway, NYC

Framing Union Square] (installed 1998), New York City, Miss collaborated with architect Lee Harris Pomeroy to create 125 red frame elements scattered throughout the 14th Street–Union Square station. The red elements highlight the disappearance of lost infrastructure as well as industrial elements that remain.

=== CALL projects ===
Roshanara's Net (2008) created a temporary garden of medicinal plants—ayurvedic herbs, trees and bushes—in New Delhi, India. The installation focused on the health and well being of the individuals and their communities.

StreamLines (2013) installed a cluster of mirrors and red beams in five Indianapolis neighborhoods, which radiate out from a central point to nearby streams and waterways. The installation was intended to get visitors to follow the beams to the nearby waterways. This project was made possible by a grant from the National Science Foundation.

== Exhibitions ==
Miss was included in the exhibition Twenty Six Contemporary Women Artists at the Aldrich Museum in 1971. Lucy Lippard was the curator, and other artists included Alice Aycock and Jackie Winsor. She was also included in the exhibition Four Young Americans alongside the artists Ann McCoy, Ree Morton, and Jackie Winsor, curated by Ellen H. Johnson and Athena Tacha at the Allen Memorial Art Museum at Oberlin College.

Along with others, Miss's work has been included in the exhibitions Decoys, Complexes and Triggers at the Sculpture Center in New York, Weather Report: Art and Climate Change organized by Lucy Lippard at the Boulder Museum of Contemporary Art, More Than Minimal: Feminism and Abstraction in the 1970s at the Rose Art Museum, and Century City: Art and Culture in the Modern Metropolis at the Tate Modern.

Miss has also been the subject of exhibitions at the Harvard University Art Museum, Brown University Gallery, The Institute of Contemporary Art in London, the Architectural Association in London, Harvard University's Graduate School of Design, and the Des Moines Art Center.

=== Selected group exhibitions ===
- Sculpture Annual (1970) Whitney Museum of American Art, New York
- Whitney Biennial (1973) Whitney Museum of American Art, New York
- Rooms (1976) P.S. 1, Institute for Art and Urban Resources, Long Island City, New York
- Nine Artists: Theodoran Awards (1977) Solomon R. Guggenheim Museum, NY
- Architectural Analogues (1978) Whitney Museum of American Art, New York
- The Minimal Tradition (1979) Aldrich Museum of Contemporary Art, Ridgefield, Connecticut
- Drawing:The Pluralist Decade (1980) Venice Biennale, Italy
- Whitney Biennial (1981) Whitney Museum of American Art, NY
- Habitats (1983) P.S. 1, Institute for Art and Urban Resources, Long Island City, New York
- Metamanhattan (1984) Whitney Museum of American Art, Downtown Branch, NY
- Sitings (1986) La Jolla Museum of Contemporary Art, La Jolla, CA; Dallas
- New Photography 8 (1992) MoMA, New York
- The Second Dimension: 20th Century Sculptors Drawings (1993) Brooklyn Museum, New York
- More Than Minimal: Feminism and Abstraction in the 70's (1996) Rose Art Museum, Brandeis University, Waltham MA.
- 100 Drawings (1999) P.S. 1, Contemporary Art Museum, Long Island City, New York
- Primarily Structural: Minimalist and Post-Minimalist Works on Paper (1999) P.S. 1, Contemporary Art Museum, Long Island City, New York
- Biennial Exhibition of Public Art, Neuberger Museum of Art (1999) S.U.N.Y. Purchase, NY.
- Earthworks: Land Reclamation as Sculpture (2000) Seattle Art Museum, Seattle, WA.
- Century City: Art and Culture in the Modern Metropolis (2001) Tate Modern, London, England
- The Art of 9/11 (2005) Apex Art, New York
- Weather Report: Artists & Climate Change (2007) curated by Lucy Lippard, Boulder Museum of Contemporary Art, Boulder, CO
- Decoys, Complexes, and Triggers: Feminism and Land Art in the 1970s (2008) Sculpture Center, Long Island City, NY
- Modern Women: Single Channel (2011) MoMA P.S. 1, Queens, New York
- Ends of the Earth: Land Art to 1974 (2012) The Museum of Contemporary Art, Los Angeles, CA
- Social Ecologies (2015) curated by Greg Lindquist, The Brooklyn Rail Curatorial Projects, Brooklyn, NY
- Minimalism: Space. Light. Object (2018), National Gallery, Singapore.
- Female Minimal (2020) Galerie Thaddaeus Ropac, Pantin, France

=== Selected solo exhibitions ===
- Projects (1976) Museum of Modern Art, New York
- Perimeters/Pavilions/Decoys (1978) Nassau County Museum of Fine Arts, Roslyn, NY
- Screened Court (1979) Minneapolis College of Art, MN
- Mirror Way (1980) Fogg Art Museum Harvard University, Cambridge, MA
- Mary Miss, (1981) Brown University and University of Rhode Island, Kingston, RI
- Art and Architecture (1983) Institute of Contemporary Art, London, England
- Pool Complex: Orchard Valley (1983–1985) Laumeier Sculpture Park, St. Louis, Missouri
- Interior Works: 1966-1984, (1984) Protetch-McNeil Gallery, NY
- Mary Miss : Projects, 1966-1987 (1987), Architectural Association, London
- Mary Miss, Photo/Drawings (1991), Freedman Gallery, Albright College, Reading, PA
- Mary Miss Photo/Drawings (1996), Des Moines Art Center, Des Moines, IA
- Mary Miss: An Artist Working in the Public Domain (2000), Roger Williams University, Bristol, RI
- Mary Miss: City as Living Laboratory, Hartford (2010-2011) Joseloff Gallery, Hartford, Connecticut

== Awards and honors ==
Miss received the New York City American Society of Landscape Architects President's Award in 2010, the American Academy in Rome's Centennial Medal in 2001, and a Medal of Honor from the American Institute of Architects in 1990. She received a fellowship from the John Simon Guggenheim Memorial Foundation in 1986. She was awarded grants by the National Endowment for the Arts in 1984, 1975, and 1974.

- Creative Artists Public Service (CAPS) grants (1973, 1977)
- Project Grant, Mott Community College, Flint, MI, 1974
- New York State Council on the Arts (1973, 1976)
- Brandeis University Creative Arts award (1982)
- Philip N. Winslow Landscape Design Award, Parks Council, NYC (1992)
- Urban Design award (in collaboration with Studio Works), Progressive Architecture Magazine (1992)
- The 2000 New York City Masterworks Award, The Municipal Arts Society and GVA Williams (2000)
- Tau Sigma Delta Gold Medal, Tau Sigma Delta Honor Society for Architecture and Allied Arts (2004)
- China Sculpture Institute, Honorable Member (2008)
- NOAA Environmental Literacy Grant for FLOW: An Innovative Educational Toolkit for Rivers Awareness (2010)
- Graham Foundation for Advanced Studies in the Fine Arts Grant, for BROADWAY: 1000 Steps (2010)
- Anonymous Was A Woman, Visual Art New York, NY (2011)
- National Science Foundation Award For Informal Science Education (ISE) for BROADWAY: 1000 STEPS (2011)
- New York City Award for Excellence in Design for The Passage: A Moving Memorial (2012)
- Pollock-Krasner Foundation Grant (2013)
- National Science Foundation Award for Indianapolis: City As Living Laboratory (2013)
- Award of Merit, The American Institute for Architecture (2015)
- Bedrock of New York Award (2017)
- Global Excellence Award, Urban Land Institute (2018)

She was named as a distinguished alumni of UC Santa Barbara in 1985.

== Personal life ==
Miss married sculptor Bruce Colvin in 1967, but later divorced in 1986. She is currently married to George Peck, a New York-based artist. They live together in Tribeca where Miss also has her studio.
