= Susan Child =

American landscape architect

- Born: 1928
- Died: November 13, 2018 (aged 89–90)
- Education: Vassar College, 1950; Radcliffe Institute, 1975; Harvard University Graduate School of Design, 1981
- Occupation: Landscape architect
- Honours: Fellow of the American Society of Landscape Architects, 2011

Susan Child (1928–2018) was an American landscape architect. She completed many residential, public, and historic preservation projects in New England.

== Personal life ==
Born in 1928 and raised in New England, Child had an early interest in art, gardening, and history. Her family would often vacation on a farm located along the estuary of Westport River in Massachusetts, which was built by her father-in-law, Josiah Child. According to the Cultural Landscape Foundation, Susan Child “cites this farm as having the deepest impression on her sensitivity to the built environment.”

Susan Child married Josiah Humphrey Child Junior, a Harvard graduate who worked in business. She then moved to Beacon Hill in Boston, where she raised her family and became an advocate for urban gardening prior to returning to education. Child went on to have three children; Susan Child, Margaret Child, and Josiah Child. She has six grandchildren; Lizzie Widdicombe, Abbott Cotton Widdicombe, Sue Widdicombe, Isabella Child, Sam Child, and Elizabeth Child Lubin.

On November 13, 2018, Susan Child died in her home in New Haven, Connecticut.

== Education ==
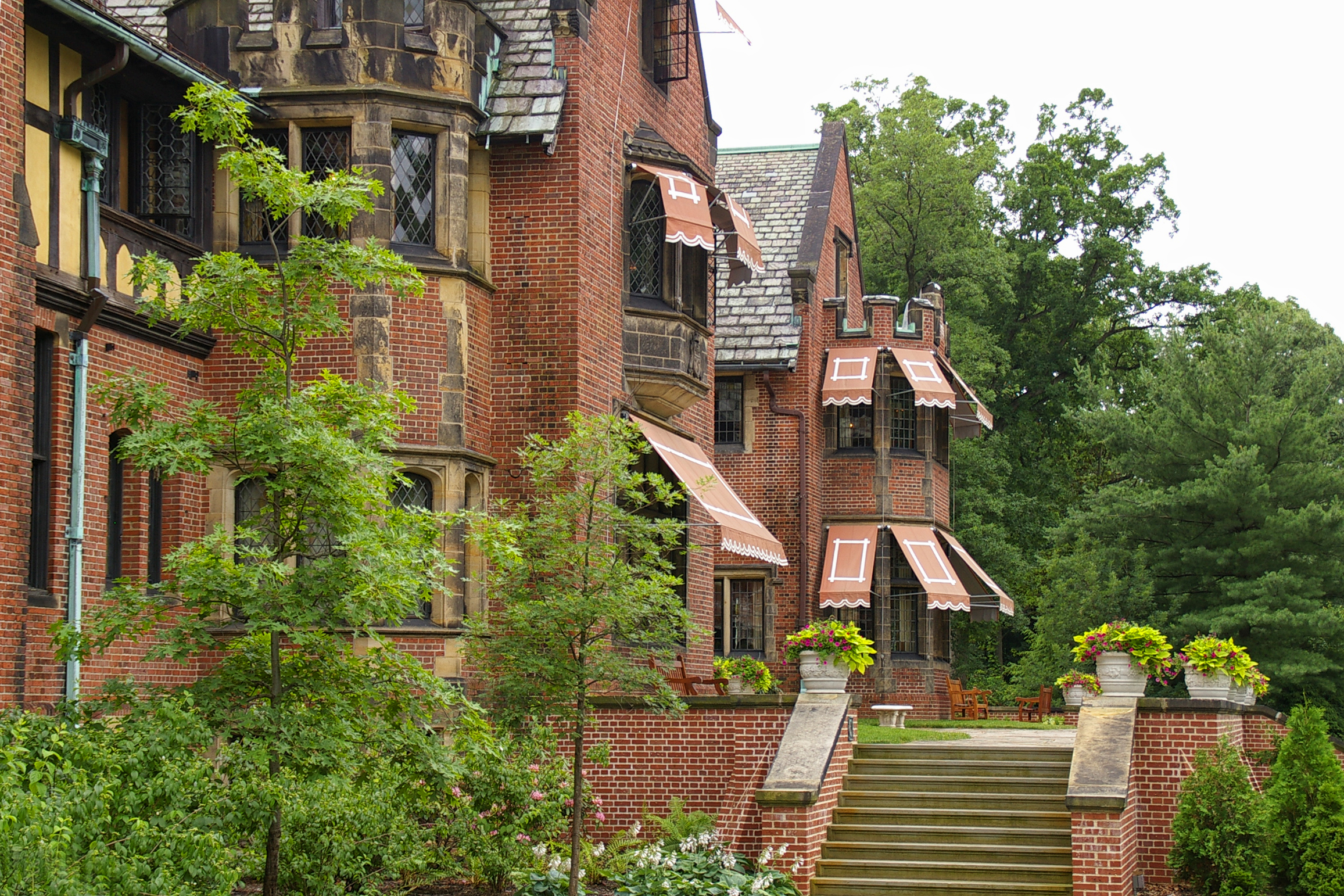
Stan Hywet Hall and Gardens, Akron OH

In 1950, Child graduated from Vassar College with an A.B. concentration in Art History and French.

In 1975, Child graduated from the Radcliffe Institute with a graduate certificate in landscape and environmental design. There, she was particularly influenced by a course titled “Intellectual History of Garden Art,” taught by Diane McGuire.

From 1975 to 1978, Child served as project manager with the City of Boston mayor's program for Revitalization of Vacant Lots (REVIVAL) and “The Greening of Boston” Neighborhood Improvement Program. She also coordinated several projects for the Parks and Recreation Department while working for the city.

Child then went on to receive her master's degree in landscape architecture from the Harvard University Graduate School of Design (GSD), graduating in 1981. While at Harvard, Child was mentored by the chair of the Landscape Architecture Department, Peter Walker. An exhibition on the work of landscape architect Dan Kiley, titled “Modern Classicist” at the GSD, also informed Child's design ethos.

== Career ==
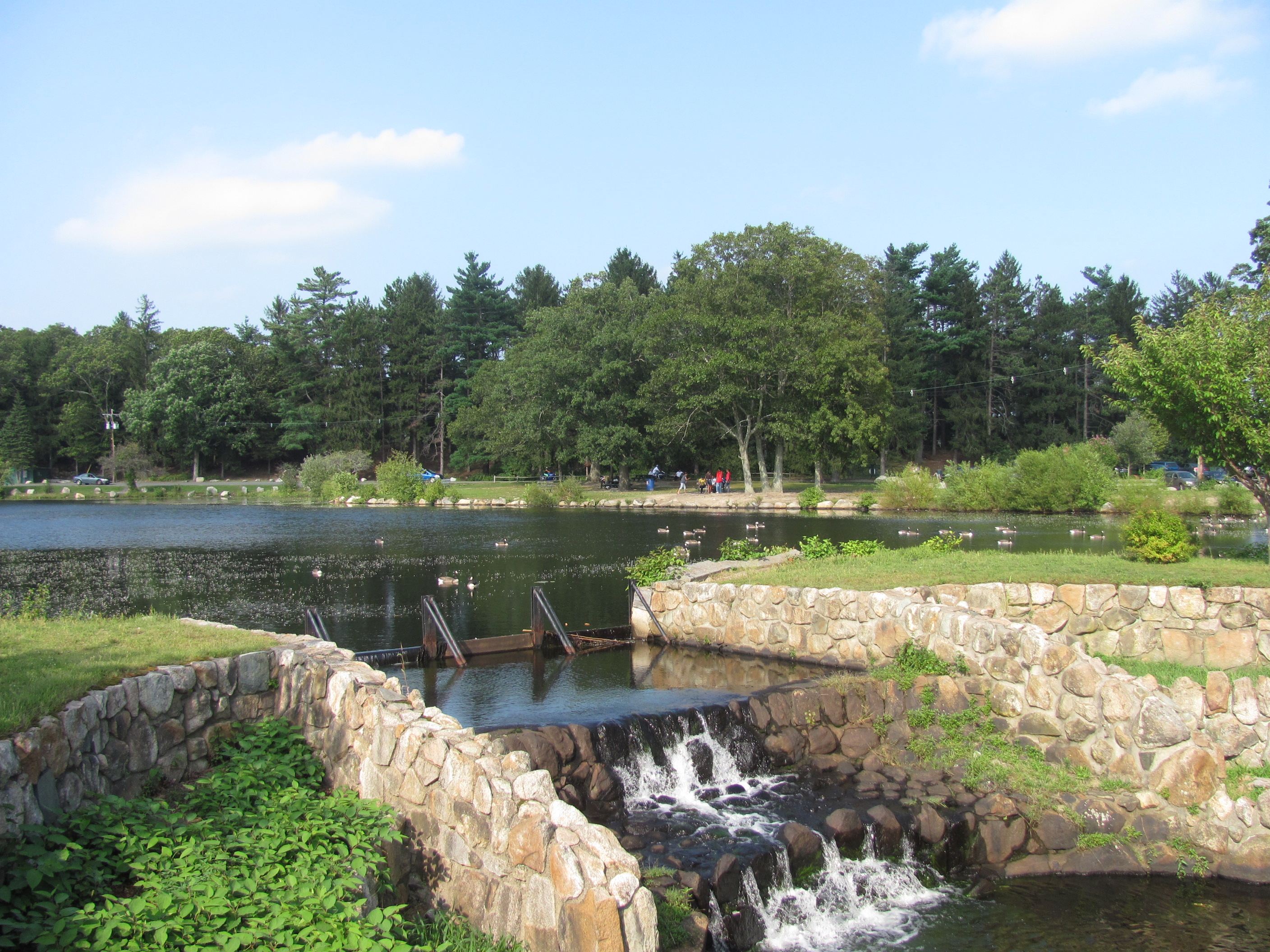
D.W. Field Park, Brockton MA

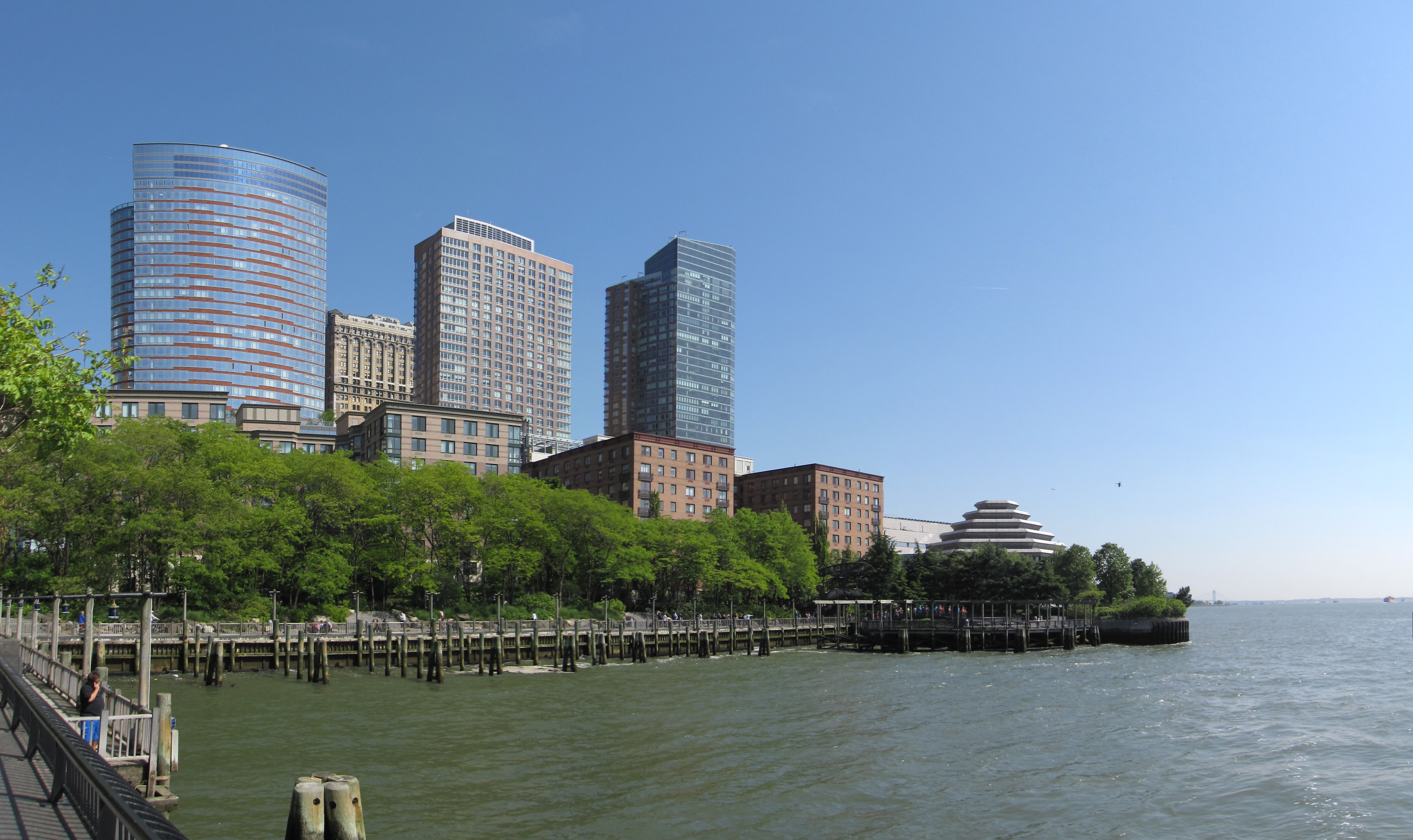
South Cove at Battery Park, New York NY

Following her graduation from Harvard, Child founded her firm Child, Hornbeck Associates, Inc. in Boston with her former professor Peter Hornbeck. Three years later, when Hornbeck left the company, she founded Child Associates Inc., Landscape Architecture with Harvard classmate Douglas Reed. The firm's projects included historic preservation work (Stan Hywet Hall, 1984), residential projects (Richmond Garden, 1986–1988), and the South Cove at Battery Park in New York. For this latter project, Child partnered with artist Mary Miss and architect Stan Eckstut to design a 3.5 acre park at the Hudson riverfront that recalled the natural coves of the northeastern landscape. Child's work influenced many other landscape architects, including Anita Berrizbeitia, Chris Moyles, and John Grove.

== Awards and honors ==
Child has won thirteen National Design Awards from the American Society of Landscape Architects (ASLA).

In 2011, Child was inducted as a Fellow of the ASLA.

== Major works ==
- Stan Hywet Hall, Akron OH (1984)
- D.W. Field Park, Brockton MA (1985–1989)
- Richmond Garden, Berkshires MA (1986–1988)
- Grand Isle Residence, Lake Champlain VT (1988–1991)
- South Cove at Battery Park, New York NY (1985–1989)
- Weir Farm, Wilton CT (1992–1997)
- Franklin Park, Boston MA (1995–1998)
- The Mount: Edith Wharton's Home, Lenox MA (1999)

== Selected bibliography ==
Serrano, Nicholas. "Susan Child." The Cultural Landscape Foundation. https://tclf.org/susan-child

Griswold, Mac. “Simple Gifts.” Garden Design 12, no. 5 (1993): 40–47.

Child, Susan. “Most Influential Landscapes.” Landscape Journal 12 (Fall 1993): 187.

Hiss, Tony. "At Land's Edge: A Contentment of Light and Shape." New York Times. Oct. 19, 1990. https://www.nytimes.com/1990/10/19/arts/at-land-s-edge-a-contentment-of-light-and-shape.html

Kirkwood, Niall. “Abstracting Nature's Details: a planted path along a cove.” The Art of Landscape Detail. New York: John Wiley & Sons, 1999: 294–306.

"Landscape Architect Susan Child Passes Away." LAND ASLA. November 27, 2018. https://www.asla.org/land/LandArticle.aspx?id=54570

Trulove, James Grayson. The New American Garden: Innovations in Residential Landscape Architecture. New York: Whitney Library of Design, 1998: 36–49.
