= Tjuvholmen Sculpture Park =

Sculpture park in Oslo, Norway

Coordinates: 59°54′23″N 10°43′19″E

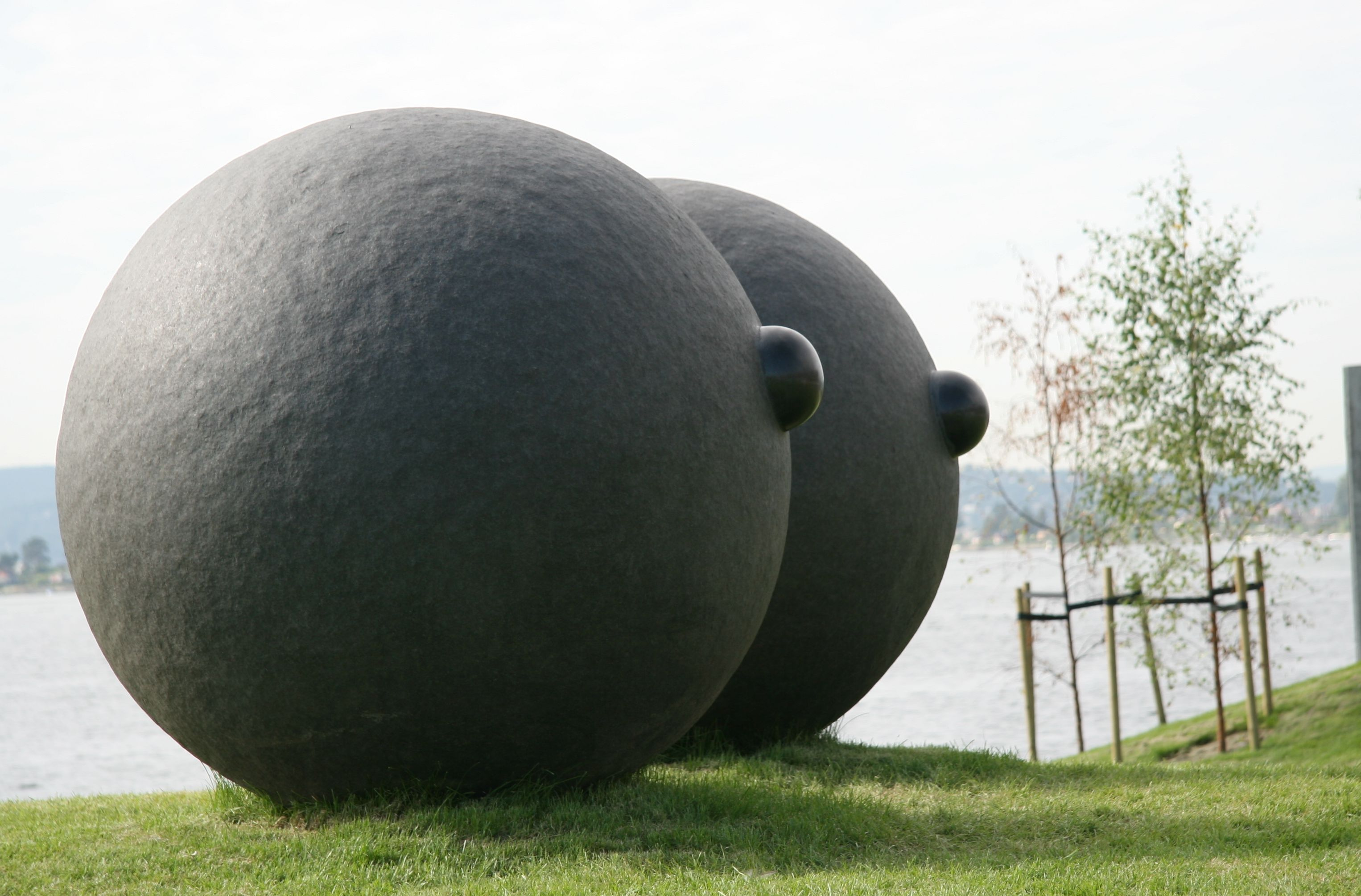
Eyes by Louise Bourgeois

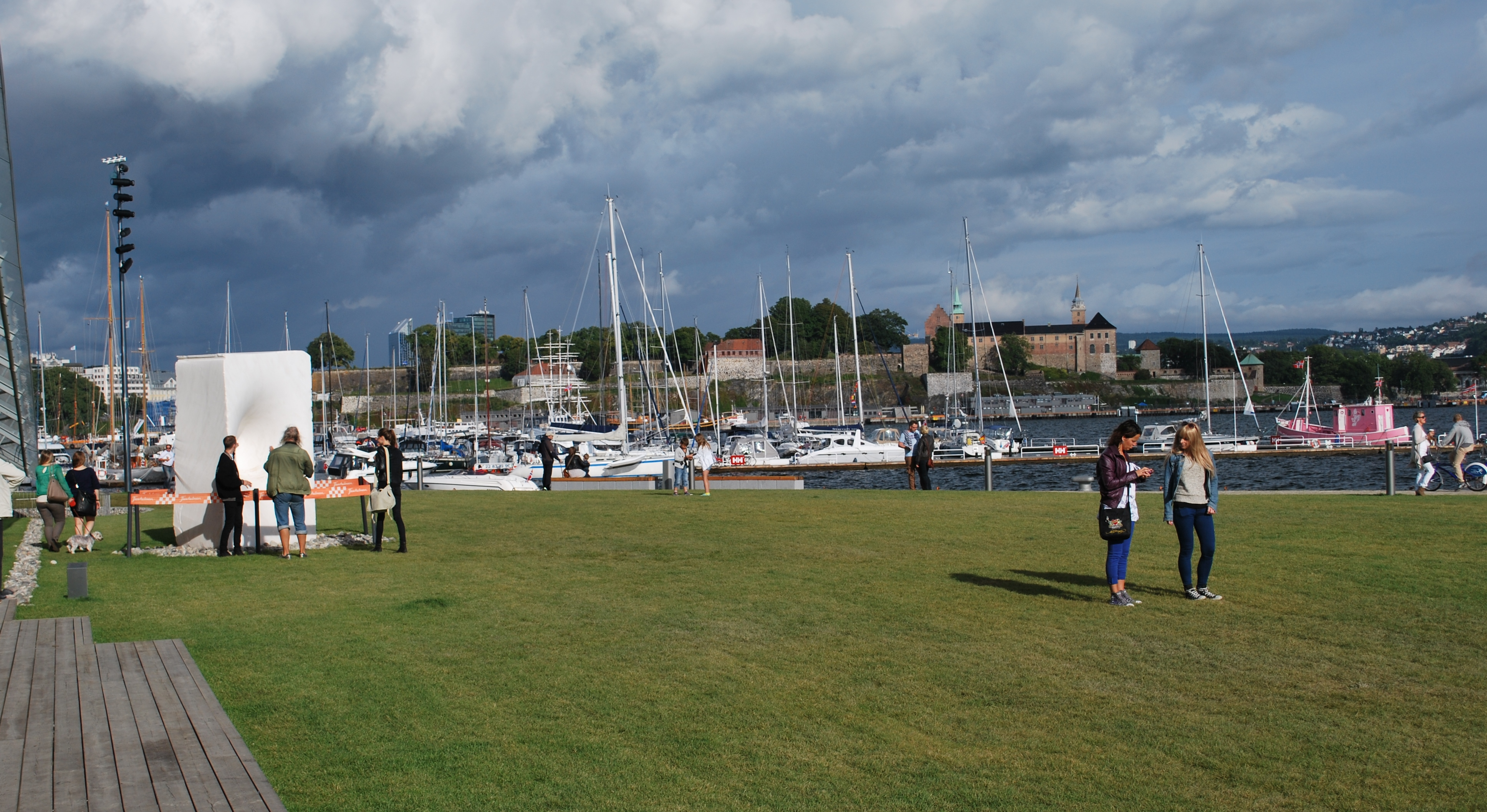
Tjuvholmen sculpture park

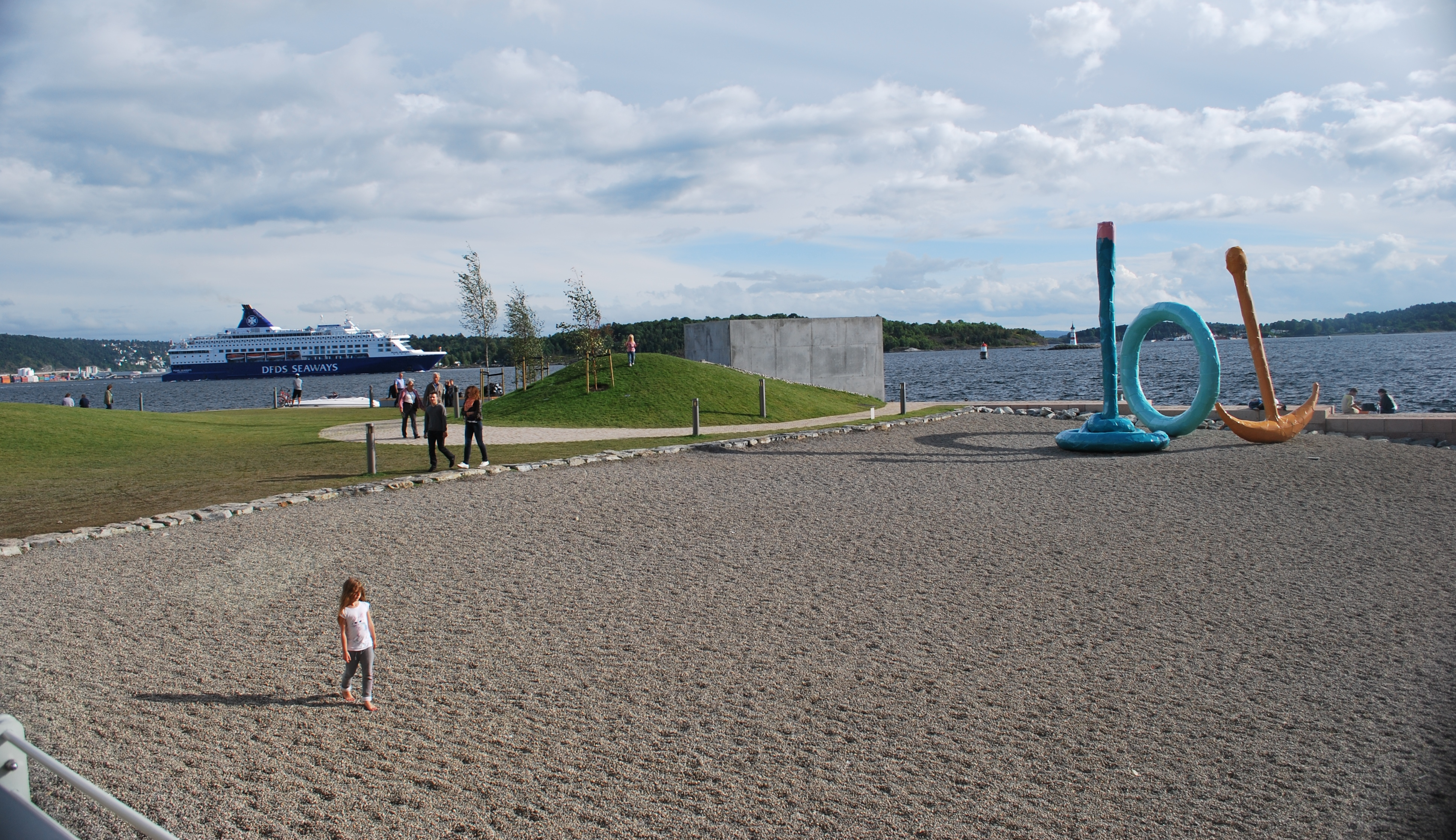
Tjuvholmen sculpture park seen south

Tjuvholmen skulpturpark is a sculpture park in the Tjuvholmen neighborhood of Frogner borough in Oslo, Norway. It is close to Aker Brygge.

== History ==
The park opened 10 August 2012, as part of a £20 million development plan for Tjuvholmen. It consists of seven pieces of art created by notable international contemporary artists such as Louise Bourgeois, Peter Fischli & David Weiss, Antony Gormley, Anish Kapoor, Ellsworth Kelly, Ugo Rondinone, and Franz West. It was expanded in 2013 with several additional sculptures. The sculptures stand out against the Oslofjord, with a view to the Akershus Castle and Akershus Fortress, and Astrup Fearnley Museum of Modern Art. Nearby, there is a beach which is open to the public.

== Design ==
The art museum was designed by the Italian architect Renzo Piano, who also designed the sculpture park. The park's concept was developed in conjunction with the Louisiana Museum of Modern Art.

=== Sculpture ===
There are seven sculptures in the park. "Things for a House on an Island" by Fischli and Weiss allows viewers to look into the structure.

- ”Things for a House on an Island” by Peter Fischli & David Weiss
- ”Eyes” by Louise Bourgeois
- ”Edge II” by Antony Gormley
- ”Untitled” by Anish Kapoor
- ”Untitled (Totem)” by Ellsworth Kelly
- ”Moonrise" by Ugo Rondinone
- ”Spalt” by Franz West
