= Ann McCoy =

American artist

- Born: 1946 (age 79–80); Boulder, Colorado
- Website: annmccoy.com

Ann McCoy (born 1946) is an American artist. During her early career she created sculptures in wood and plastic resin. Beginning in the early 1970s, she abandoned sculpture to focus on large-scale drawings in colored pencil. She was a Guggenheim Foundation fellow in 2019.

== Early life and education ==
McCoy received a BFA degree from the University of Colorado Boulder in 1969 and an MA degree in sculpture and drawing from the University of California, Los Angeles in 1972.

Her image is included in the iconic 1972 poster Some Living American Women Artists by Mary Beth Edelson.

== Collections ==
Her work is included in the collections of the Smithsonian American Art Museum, the Los Angeles County Museum of Art, the Museum of Modern Art, New York, the Whitney Museum of American Art and the Art Institute of Chicago.
