= Modern Head =

Sculptures by Roy Lichtenstein

Modern Head (Smithsonian Copy)
- Artist: Roy Lichtenstein
- Year: 1989
- Type: Painted Steel (approx. weight 11,600 lbs, including metal base)
- Dimensions: 940 cm × 590 cm × 20 cm (372 in × 232 in × 8 in)
- Location: Washington, D.C.; 38.89745°N 77.0237°W
- Owner: Smithsonian Institution

Modern Head is the name given to five extant 31-foot tall steel sculptures by Roy Lichtenstein. It has sometimes been claimed that the artist produced Modern Head as an edition of four sculptures; however, this is incorrect.

In 1989, three pieces (signed and numbered 1/2 and 2/2, together with an artist's proof) were executed in brushed stainless steel at Lippincott, Inc in North Haven, Connecticut.

Piece #1 was at one time on short-term loan (starting May 15, 1991) in Battery Park, New York City, at the South End Avenue cul-de-sac at Liberty Street. Subsequently, it was loaned to the Nassau County Museum of Art, before being dismantled and sent to Japan in 2001. It is now owned by Matsumoto Dental University in Shiojiri, Nagano, Japan.

Piece #2 is at Yale University.

The artist's proof was donated to the city of Jerusalem, in memory of slain Israeli Prime Minister Yitzhak Rabin; it is located in Daniel Park, in the Jerusalem municipality complex next to city hall.

A fourth piece, issued as a later "one off" by the artist, was painted blue. The James Goodman Gallery in New York lent it to New York City, where it was installed in Battery Park in January 1996 near the site where piece #1 once stood. This work remained undamaged from the September 11 attacks of 2001, despite being only a block away, and was reportedly used as a message board by the Federal Bureau of Investigation during its investigation of the attacks. It was later moved to the Fairchild Tropical Botanic Garden, and was acquired by Jeffrey H. Loria, who donated it to the Smithsonian Institution. Presently, this piece is located at the south side of the Smithsonian American Art Museum, Northwest, Washington, D.C., where it was installed on August 27, 2008.

In 2019, a new, fifth edition was installed at The Ohio State University.

An untitled earlier version of the work, constructed of wood, polyester and metal, and also painted blue, was installed at the Santa Anita Fashion Park in Arcadia, California, in 1974. The work remained there until October 1988, after which it was destroyed.

In addition, there is an identical work in brass miniature that dates from 1969 to 1970. Known as "Untitled Head I", the piece measures 65.1 cm in height.

In exploring the abstract "Modern Head" theme, Lichtenstein also produced similarly titled works in other media and materials, including lithograph, woodcut, line-cut embossing, embossed graphite, and metal.

== See also ==
- List of public art in Washington, D.C.
