= Frank A. Miller (New York politician) =

American politician

Frank A. Miller (January 9, 1888 – June 25, 1931) was an American politician from New York.

== Life ==
He was born on January 9, 1888, in Greenpoint, Brooklyn. He attended Public School No. 31. He worked for silent movie theaters as a musical director and sound effects engineer, and invented musical devices. On September 1, 1907, he married Agnes C. Baumann, and they had three children. In 1915, he opened his own business: the Lyceum Theatrical Booking Agency.

Miller was a member of the New York State Assembly (Kings Co., 20th D.) in 1922, 1923, 1924, 1925, 1926, 1927, 1928, 1929, 1930 and 1931.

He died on June 25, 1931.

== Sources ==
New York State Assembly
Preceded by John O. Gempler	New York State Assembly; Kings County, 20th District; 1922–1931	Succeeded by Joseph J. Monahan
