= 156th New York State Legislature =

New York state legislative session

←	155th	157th	→
- New York State Capitol (2009)

Overview
- Legislative body: New York State Legislature
- Jurisdiction: New York, United States
- Term: January 1 – December 31, 1933

Senate
- Members: 51
- President: Lt. Gov. M. William Bray (D)
- Temporary President: John J. Dunnigan (D)
- Party control: Democratic (26–25)

Assembly
- Members: 150
- Speaker: Joseph A. McGinnies (R)
- Party control: Republican (77–73)

Sessions
- 1st: January 4 – April 10, 1933
- 2nd: July 26 – August 24, 1933
- 3rd: October 18 – 19, 1933

The 156th New York State Legislature, consisting of the New York State Senate and the New York State Assembly, met from January 4 to October 19, 1933, during the first year of Herbert H. Lehman's governorship, in Albany.

== Background ==
Under the provisions of the New York Constitution of 1894, re-apportioned in 1917, 51 Senators and 150 assemblymen were elected in single-seat districts; senators for a two-year term, assemblymen for a one-year term. The senatorial districts consisted either of one or more entire counties; or a contiguous area within a single county. The counties which were divided into more than one senatorial district were New York (nine districts), Kings (eight), Bronx (three), Erie (three), Monroe (two), Queens (two) and Westchester (two). The Assembly districts were made up of contiguous area, all within the same county.

At this time there were two major political parties: the Democratic Party and the Republican Party. The Socialist Party, the Communist Party and the Socialist Labor Party also nominated tickets. The Prohibition Party adopted at this time the name Law Preservation Party: to emphasize that Prohibition should be preserved while encountering rampant opposition to it. They endorsed the "dry" Republicans and nominated own candidates in many districts where "wet" Republicans were running.

== Elections ==
The 1932 New York state election, was held on November 8. Governor Franklin D. Roosevelt was elected President of the United States; Lieutenant Governor Herbert H. Lehman was elected Governor; and M. William Bray was elected Lieutenant Governor; all three Democrats. Of the other six statewide elective offices, five were carried by Democrats and one by a Republican judge with Democratic endorsement. The approximate party strength at this election, as expressed by the vote for Governor, was: Democrats 2,660,000; Republicans 1,812,000; Socialists 103,000; Law Preservation 83,000; Communists 26,000; and Socialist Labor 7,000.

Assemblywoman Rhoda Fox Graves (Rep.), of Gouverneur, a former school teacher who after her marriage became active in women's organisations and politics, ran for the State Senate in the 34th district, but was defeated in the Republican primary by the incumbent Warren T. Thayer. No women were elected to the 156th Legislature.

== Sessions ==
The Legislature met for the regular session at the State Capitol in Albany on January 4, 1933; and adjourned on April 10.

Joseph A. McGinnies (Rep.) was re-elected Speaker.

John J. Dunnigan (Dem.) was elected Temporary President of the State Senate.

On June 27, a state convention met to ratify the Twenty-first Amendment to the United States Constitution which proposed to repeal Prohibition.

The Legislature met for a special session at the State Capitol in Albany on July 26; and adjourned on August 24.

The Legislature met for another special session at the State Capitol in Albany on October 18; and adjourned on the next day.

== State Senate ==
=== Districts ===
- 1st District: Nassau and Suffolk counties
- 2nd and 3rd District: Parts of Queens County, i.e. the Borough of Queens
- 4th, 5th, 6th, 7th, 8th, 9th, 10th and 11th District: Parts of Kings County, i.e. the Borough of Brooklyn
- 12th, 13th, 14th, 15th, 16th, 17th, 18th, 19th and 20th District: Parts of New York County, i.e. the Borough of Manhattan
- 21st, 22nd and 23rd District: Parts of Bronx County, i.e. the Borough of the Bronx
- 24th District: Richmond County, i.e. the Borough of Richmond (now the Borough of Staten Island), and Rockland County
- 25th District: Part of Westchester County
- 26th District: Cortlandt, Greenburgh, Mount Pleasant, Ossining and part of Yonkers; in Westchester County
- 27th District: Orange and Sullivan counties
- 28th District: Columbia, Dutchess and Putnam counties
- 29th District: Delaware, Greene and Ulster counties
- 30th District: Albany County
- 31st District: Rensselaer County
- 32nd District: Saratoga and Schenectady counties
- 33rd District: Clinton, Essex, Warren and Washington counties
- 34th District: Franklin and St. Lawrence counties
- 35th District: Fulton, Hamilton, Herkimer and Lewis counties
- 36th District: Oneida County
- 37th District: Jefferson and Oswego counties
- 38th District: Onondaga County
- 39th District: Madison, Montgomery, Otsego and Schoharie counties
- 40th District: Broome, Chenango and Cortland counties
- 41st District: Chemung, Schuyler, Tioga and Tompkins counties
- 42nd District: Cayuga, Seneca and Wayne counties
- 43rd District: Ontario, Steuben and Yates counties
- 44th District: Allegany, Genesee, Livingston and Wyoming
- 45th and 46th District: Monroe County
- 47th District: Niagara and Orleans counties
- 48th, 49th and 50th District: Erie County
- 51st District: Cattaraugus and Chautauqua counties

=== Members ===
The asterisk (*) denotes members of the previous Legislature who continued in office as members of this Legislature. Joseph A. Esquirol and Samuel Mandelbaum changed from the Assembly to the Senate.

Note: For brevity, the chairmanships omit the words "...the Committee on (the)..."

District	Senator	Party	Notes
1st	George L. Thompson*	Republican	re-elected
2nd	Joseph D. Nunan Jr.*	Democrat	re-elected; Chairman of Civil Service
3rd	Frank B. Hendel*	Democrat	re-elected; Chairman of Public Printing
4th	Philip M. Kleinfeld*	Democrat	re-elected; Chairman of Excise
5th	John J. Howard*	Democrat	re-elected; Chairman of Penal Institutions
6th	Marcellus H. Evans*	Democrat	re-elected; Chairman of General Laws
7th	George Blumberg	Republican	
8th	Joseph A. Esquirol*	Democrat	Chairman of Public Health
9th	Henry L. O'Brien*	Democrat	re-elected; Chairman of Labor and Industry
10th	Jeremiah F. Twomey*	Democrat	re-elected; Chairman of Finance
11th	James J. Crawford*	Democrat	re-elected; Chairman of Pensions
12th	Elmer F. Quinn*	Democrat	re-elected; Chairman of Codes
13th	Thomas F. Burchill*	Democrat	re-elected; Chairman of Public Service
14th	Samuel Mandelbaum*	Democrat	Chairman of Cities
15th	John L. Buckley*	Democrat	re-elected; Chairman of Taxation and Retrenchment
16th	John J. McNaboe*	Democrat	re-elected; Chairman of Conservation; and of Re-Apportionment
17th	Albert Wald	Democrat	Chairman of Revision; and of Printed and Engrossed Bills
18th	John T. McCall*	Democrat	re-elected; Chairman of Banks
19th	Duncan T. O'Brien*	Democrat	re-elected; Chairman of Insurance
20th	A. Spencer Feld*	Democrat	re-elected; Chairman of Public Education
21st	Henry G. Schackno*	Democrat	re-elected; Chairman of Judiciary; on November 7, 1933, elected to the City Court (Bronx); resigned his seat on November 21
22nd	Julius S. Berg*	Democrat	re-elected; Chairman of Privileges and Elections
23rd	John J. Dunnigan*	Democrat	re-elected; elected Temporary President; Chairman of Rules
24th	Harry J. Palmer*	Democrat	re-elected; Chairman of Internal Affairs
25th	Walter W. Westall*	Republican	re-elected
26th	Seabury C. Mastick*	Rep./Law P.	re-elected; contested by Richard E. FitzGibbons (D)
27th	Thomas C. Desmond*	Republican	re-elected
28th	J. Griswold Webb*	Republican	re-elected
29th	Arthur H. Wicks*	Rep./Law P.	re-elected
30th	William T. Byrne*	Democrat	re-elected; Chairman of Agriculture
31st	Ogden J. Ross	Democrat	Chairman of Military Affairs
32nd	Alexander G. Baxter*	Rep./Law P.	re-elected
33rd	Benjamin F. Feinberg	Republican	
34th	Warren T. Thayer*	Republican	re-elected
35th	Henry I. Patrie*	Rep./Law P.	re-elected
36th	Michael J. Kernan	Democrat	Chairman of Affairs of Villages
37th	Perley A. Pitcher*	Republican	re-elected
38th	George R. Fearon*	Republican	re-elected; Minority Leader
39th	Walter W. Stokes	Republican	
40th	Bert Lord*	Rep./Law P.	re-elected
41st	Frank A. Frost*	Rep./Law P.	re-elected
42nd	Charles J. Hewitt*	Republican	re-elected
43rd	Earle S. Warner	Republican	
44th	Joe R. Hanley*	Rep./Law P.	re-elected
45th	Cosmo A. Cilano*	Republican	re-elected
46th	Fred J. Slater*	Republican	re-elected
47th	William H. Lee	Republican	
48th	Lawrence G. Williams	Republican	
49th	Stephen J. Wojtkowiak*	Democrat	re-elected; Chairman of Commerce and Navigation
50th	Nelson W. Cheney*	Republican	re-elected
51st	Leigh G. Kirkland*	Rep./Law P.	re-elected

=== Employees ===
- Clerk: Patrick H. O'Connell, died on June 22, 1933

== State Assembly ==
=== Assemblymen ===
Note: For brevity, the chairmanships omit the words "...the Committee on (the)..."

District		Assemblymen	Party	Notes
Albany	1st	John H. Cahill*	Democrat	
Albany	2nd	John P. Hayes*	Democrat	
Albany	3rd	S. Earl McDermott	Democrat	
Allegany		Harry E. Goodrich*	Rep./Law P.	
Bronx	1st	Nicholas J. Eberhard*	Democrat	
Bronx	2nd	William F. Smith*	Democrat	
Bronx	3rd	Carl Pack*	Democrat	
Bronx	4th	Herman M. Albert*	Democrat	
Bronx	5th	Harry A. Samberg*	Democrat	
Bronx	6th	Christopher C. McGrath*	Democrat	
Bronx	7th	John F. Reidy*	Democrat	
Bronx	8th	John A. Devany Jr.*	Democrat	
Broome	1st	Albert L. Brown	Democrat	
Broome	2nd	Martin W. Deyo	Rep./Law P.	
Cattaraugus		James W. Riley*	Republican	
Cayuga		Fred Lewis Palmer*	Rep./Law P.	
Chautauqua	1st	David L. Brunstrom	Republican	
Chautauqua	2nd	Joseph A. McGinnies*	Rep./Law P.	re-elected Speaker; Chairman of Rules
Chemung		G. Archie Turner*	Rep./Law P.	Chairman of Excise
Chenango		Irving M. Ives*	Republican	
Clinton		Leo E. Trombly*	Democrat	
Columbia		Frederick A. Washburn*	Republican	
Cortland		Irving F. Rice*	Rep./Law P.	Chairman of Public Education
Delaware		E. Ogden Bush	Republican	
Dutchess	1st	Howard N. Allen*	Rep./Law P.	
Dutchess	2nd	Charles F. Close*	Republican	
Erie	1st	Charles J. Gimbrone*	Republican	
Erie	2nd	William L. Marcy Jr.*	Republican	
Erie	3rd	Frank X. Bernhardt*	Republican	
Erie	4th	Anthony J. Canney*	Democrat	
Erie	5th	Edwin L. Kantowski*	Democrat	
Erie	6th	Howard W. Dickey*	Republican	
Erie	7th	Arthur L. Swartz*	Republican	
Erie	8th	R. Foster Piper*	Republican	
Essex		Fred L. Porter*	Republican	Chairman of Ways and Means
Franklin		James A. Latour*	Republican	
Fulton and Hamilton		Harry F. Dunkel*	Republican	
Genesee		Herbert A. Rapp*	Rep./Law P.	
Greene		Ellis W. Bentley*	Rep./Law P.	Chairman of Conservation
Herkimer		Edward O. Davies*	Rep./Law P.	
Jefferson		Jasper W. Cornaire*	Rep./Law P.	Chairman of Motor Vehicles
Kings	1st	Crawford W. Hawkins*	Democrat	
Kings	2nd	Albert D. Schanzer*	Democrat	
Kings	3rd	Michael J. Gillen*	Democrat	
Kings	4th	George E. Dennen*	Democrat	
Kings	5th	John J. Cooney*	Democrat	
Kings	6th	Jacob J. Schwartzwald*	Democrat	
Kings	7th	William Kirnan*	Democrat	
Kings	8th	Luke O'Reilly*	Democrat	
Kings	9th	Daniel McNamara Jr.*	Democrat	
Kings	10th	William C. McCreery*	Democrat	
Kings	11th	Edward J. Coughlin*	Democrat	
Kings	12th	Edward S. Moran Jr.*	Democrat	
Kings	13th	William Breitenbach*	Democrat	
Kings	14th	Jacob P. Nathanson*	Democrat	
Kings	15th	Edward P. Doyle*	Democrat	
Kings	16th	Maurice Z. Bungard*	Democrat	
Kings	17th	George W. Stewart*	Democrat	
Kings	18th	Irwin Steingut*	Democrat	Minority Leader
Kings	19th	Jerome G. Ambro*	Democrat	
Kings	20th	Joseph J. Monahan*	Democrat	
Kings	21st	Charles H. Breitbart	Democrat	
Kings	22nd	Jacob H. Livingston*	Democrat	
Kings	23rd	Albert M. Cohen*	Democrat	
Lewis		Edward M. Sheldon*	Rep./Law P.	
Livingston		James J. Wadsworth*	Republican	
Madison		Arthur A. Hartshorn*	Rep./Law P.	
Monroe	1st	Daniel J. O'Mara*	Republican	
Monroe	2nd	George B. Kelly	Democrat	
Monroe	3rd	Haskell H. Marks*	Republican	
Monroe	4th	Richard L. Saunders*	Republican	
Monroe	5th	W. Ray Austin*	Republican	Chairman of Public Health
Montgomery		L. James Shaver	Republican	
Nassau	1st	Edwin W. Wallace*	Republican	Chairman of Affairs of Villages
Nassau	2nd	Edwin R. Lynde*	Republican	
New York	1st	James J. Dooling*	Democrat	
New York	2nd	Millard E. Theodore*	Democrat	
New York	3rd	Sylvester A. Dineen*	Democrat	
New York	4th	Leonard Farbstein	Democrat	
New York	5th	John F. Killgrew*	Democrat	
New York	6th	Irving D. Neustein*	Democrat	
New York	7th	Saul S. Streit*	Democrat	
New York	8th	Joseph Hamerman	Democrat	
New York	9th	Ira H. Holley*	Democrat	
New York	10th	Herbert Brownell Jr.	Republican	
New York	11th	Patrick H. Sullivan*	Democrat	
New York	12th	John A. Byrnes*	Democrat	
New York	13th	William J. Sheldrick*	Democrat	
New York	14th	Edward V. Loughlin	Democrat	
New York	15th	Abbot Low Moffat*	Republican	
New York	16th	William Schwartz*	Democrat	
New York	17th	Meyer Alterman*	Democrat	
New York	18th	Sol A. Hyman*	Democrat	
New York	19th	James E. Stephens*	Democrat	
New York	20th	Louis A. Cuvillier*	Democrat	
New York	21st	David Paris*	Democrat	
New York	22nd	Benjamin B. Mittler*	Democrat	
New York	23rd	Alexander A. Falk*	Democrat	
Niagara	1st	Fayette E. Pease*	Rep./Law P.	
Niagara	2nd	Roy Hewitt*	Republican	
Oneida	1st	Frank T. Quinn	Democrat	
Oneida	2nd	Russell G. Dunmore*	Rep./Law P.	Majority Leader
Oneida	3rd	Walter W. Abbott*	Rep./Law P.	
Onondaga	1st	Horace M. Stone*	Republican	Chairman of Judiciary
Onondaga	2nd	Willis H. Sargent*	Republican	Chairman of Banks
Onondaga	3rd	Richard B. Smith*	Republican	Chairman of Affairs of Cities
Ontario		Robert A. Catchpole*	Rep./Law P.	Chairman of Public Service
Orange	1st	William J. Lamont*	Republican	
Orange	2nd	Rainey S. Taylor*	Republican	
Orleans		John S. Thompson*	Republican	
Oswego		Victor C. Lewis*	Rep./Law P.	Chairman of Canals
Otsego		Frank M. Smith*	Republican	Chairman of Agriculture
Putnam		D. Mallory Stephens*	Republican	
Queens	1st	Harold J. Crawford	Democrat	
Queens	2nd	George F. Torsney	Democrat	
Queens	3rd	Peter T. Farrell*	Democrat	
Queens	4th	James A. Burke*	Democrat	
Queens	5th	Maurice A. FitzGerald*	Democrat	
Queens	6th	Frederick L. Zimmerman*	Democrat	
Rensselaer	1st	Michael F. Breen*	Democrat	
Rensselaer	2nd	Maurice Whitney*	Republican	Chairman of Commerce and Navigation
Richmond	1st	Francis P. Heffernan*	Democrat	
Richmond	2nd	William L. Vaughan*	Democrat	
Rockland		Fred R. Horn Jr.*	Democrat	
St. Lawrence	1st	W. Allan Newell	Republican	
St. Lawrence	2nd	Walter L. Pratt*	Republican	Chairman of Taxation
Saratoga		Burton D. Esmond*	Republican	Chairman of Codes
Schenectady	1st	Oswald D. Heck*	Rep./Law P.	
Schenectady	2nd	John H. Buhrmaster*	Rep./Law P.	
Schoharie		William S. Dunn	Dem./Soc.	
Schuyler		Edward K. Corwin	Rep./Law P.	
Seneca		James D. Pollard*	Republican	
Steuben	1st	Wilson Messer*	Republican	Chairman of Charitable and Religious Societies
Steuben	2nd	J. Austin Otto*	Republican	
Suffolk	1st	John G. Downs*	Republican	
Suffolk	2nd	Hamilton F. Potter*	Republican	
Sullivan		Benjamin R. Gerow	Democrat	
Tioga		Frank G. Miller*	Rep./Law P.	
Tompkins		James R. Robinson*	Republican	Chairman of Labor and Industry
Ulster		J. Edward Conway	Republican	
Warren		Harry A. Reoux*	Republican	
Washington		Herbert A. Bartholomew*	Rep./Law P.	Chairman of Internal Affairs
Wayne		Harry L. Averill*	Republican	
Westchester	1st	Herbert R. Smith	Rep./Law P.	
Westchester	2nd	Ralph A. Gamble*	Rep./Law P.	
Westchester	3rd	Hickson F. Hart*	Republican	
Westchester	4th	Alexander H. Garnjost*	Rep./Law P.	Chairman of Insurance
Westchester	5th	William F. Condon*	Rep./Law P.	
Wyoming		Harold C. Ostertag*	Rep./Law P.	
Yates		Fred S. Hollowell*	Republican	

=== Employees ===
- Clerk: Fred W. Hammond

== Sources ==
- Members of the New York Senate (1930s) at Political Graveyard
- Members of the New York Assembly (1930s) at Political Graveyard
- TWOMEY HEADS FINANCE GROUP in the New York Sun on January 10, 1933
- McGinnies Gives Post To Friend of Macy in the Syracuse Journal, of Syracuse, on January 15, 1934
