= John F. Williams (American politician) =

American farmer and politician

Member of the New York Senate from the 31st district
- In office 1925–1932
- Preceded by: John P. Ryan
- Succeeded by: Ogden J. Ross

John F. Williams (1885 – January 2, 1963) was an American farmer and politician from New York.

== Life ==
He was born in 1885 in Troy, Rensselaer County, New York. In 1893, the family removed to a farm in North Greenbush. He attended grammar school and Troy Business College.

He was Supervisor of the Town of North Greenbush in 1920 and 1921; and Sheriff of Rensselaer County, New York from 1922 to 1924. He also served for a time as secretary of the New York State Racing Commission.

Williams was a member of the New York State Senate (31st D.) from 1925 to 1932, sitting in the 148th, 149th, 150th, 151st, 152nd, 153rd, 154th and 155th New York State Legislatures.

He died at St. Mary's Hospital in Troy, following a brief illness.

New York State Senate
Preceded by John P. Ryan	New York State Senate; 31st District; 1925–1932	Succeeded by Ogden J. Ross
