= Jacob P. Nathanson =

American politician

Jacob P. Nathanson (February 21, 1901 – March 2, 1986) was an American lawyer and politician from New York.

== Life ==
He was born on February 21, 1901, in the Russian Empire. He was admitted to the bar in 1926.

Nathanson was a member of the New York State Assembly (Kings Co., 14th D.) in 1927, 1928, 1929, 1930, 1931, 1932 and 1933. In December 1930, the Brooklyn Bar Association accused Nathanson of professional misconduct while handling a bail bond for a client. He was suspended from the practice of law in 1931, and ordered to return the $500 bail money to the client. In September 1933, Nathanson was defeated by Aaron F. Goldstein when seeking renomination in the Democratic primary election.

On November 21, 1938, Nathanson pleaded guilty to subornation of perjury in another case of a fraudulent bail bond. On April 8, 1939, he was disbarred by the Appellate Division.

He died on March 2, 1986, in Lake Worth Beach, Palm Beach County, Florida. He was Jewish.

== Sources ==
New York State Assembly
| Preceded by Harry Landau | New York State Assembly; Kings County, 14th District; 1927–1933 | Succeeded by Aaron F. Goldstein |
