= Arthur L. Swartz =

American politician

Arthur L. Swartz (September 10, 1888 – May 14, 1940) was an American politician from New York.

== Life ==
He was born on September 10, 1888, in Buffalo, New York. He attended Public School Nr. 13 and Masten Park High School.

Swartz was a member of the New York State Assembly (Erie Co., 7th D.) in 1929, 1930, 1931, 1932, 1933, 1934, 1935 and 1936; and was Chairman of the Committee on Penal Institutions from 1934 and 1936.

He was a member of the New York State Senate (50th D.) in 1939 and 1940.

He died on May 14, 1940, at his home in Kenmore, New York, of heart disease; and was buried at the Forest Lawn Cemetery in Buffalo.

== Sources ==
New York State Assembly
Preceded by Edmund F. Cooke	New York State Assembly; Erie County, 7th District; 1929–1936	Succeeded by Charles O. Burney, Jr.
New York State Senate
Preceded by Nelson W. Cheney	New York State Senate; 50th District; 1939–1940	Succeeded by Charles O. Burney, Jr.
