= 155th New York State Legislature =

New York state legislative session

←	154th	156th	→
- New York State Capitol (2009)

Overview
- Legislative body: New York State Legislature
- Jurisdiction: New York, United States
- Term: January 1 – December 31, 1932

Senate
- Members: 51
- President: Lt. Gov. Herbert H. Lehman (D)
- Temporary President: George R. Fearon (R)
- Party control: Republican (27–24)

Assembly
- Members: 150
- Speaker: Joseph A. McGinnies (R)
- Party control: Republican (80–70)

Sessions
- 1st: January 6 – March 11, 1932
- 2nd: December 9 – 14, 1932

The 155th New York State Legislature, consisting of the New York State Senate and the New York State Assembly, met from January 6 to December 14, 1932, during the fourth year of Franklin D. Roosevelt's governorship, in Albany.

== Background ==
Under the provisions of the New York Constitution of 1894, re-apportioned in 1917, 51 Senators and 150 assemblymen were elected in single-seat districts; senators for a two-year term, assemblymen for a one-year term. The senatorial districts consisted either of one or more entire counties; or a contiguous area within a single county. The counties which were divided into more than one senatorial district were New York (nine districts), Kings (eight), Bronx (three), Erie (three), Monroe (two), Queens (two) and Westchester (two). The Assembly districts were made up of contiguous area, all within the same county.

At this time there were two major political parties: the Democratic Party and the Republican Party. The Socialist Party and the Communist Party also nominated tickets.

== Elections ==
The 1931 New York state election was held on November 3. No statewide elective offices were up for election.

Assemblywoman Rhoda Fox Graves (Rep.), of Gouverneur, a former school teacher who after her marriage became active in women's organisations and politics, was re-elected, and remained the only woman legislator.

== Sessions ==
The Legislature met for the regular session at the State Capitol in Albany on January 6, 1932; and adjourned on March 11.

Joseph A. McGinnies (Rep.) was re-elected Speaker.

The Legislature met for a special session at the State Capitol in Albany on December 9, 1932; and adjourned on December 14. This session was called to enact legislation to avoid the financial breakdown of New York City which threatened to occur on December 17.

== State senate ==
=== Districts ===
- 1st District: Nassau and Suffolk counties
- 2nd and 3rd District: Parts of Queens County, i.e. the Borough of Queens
- 4th, 5th, 6th, 7th, 8th, 9th, 10th and 11th District: Parts of Kings County, i.e. the Borough of Brooklyn
- 12th, 13th, 14th, 15th, 16th, 17th, 18th, 19th and 20th District: Parts of New York County, i.e. the Borough of Manhattan
- 21st, 22nd and 23rd District: Parts of Bronx County, i.e. the Borough of the Bronx
- 24th District: Richmond County, i.e. the Borough of Richmond (now the Borough of Staten Island), and Rockland County
- 25th District: Part of Westchester County
- 26th District: Cortlandt, Greenburgh, Mount Pleasant, Ossining and part of Yonkers; in Westchester County
- 27th District: Orange and Sullivan counties
- 28th District: Columbia, Dutchess and Putnam counties
- 29th District: Delaware, Greene and Ulster counties
- 30th District: Albany County
- 31st District: Rensselaer County
- 32nd District: Saratoga and Schenectady counties
- 33rd District: Clinton, Essex, Warren and Washington counties
- 34th District: Franklin and St. Lawrence counties
- 35th District: Fulton, Hamilton, Herkimer and Lewis counties
- 36th District: Oneida County
- 37th District: Jefferson and Oswego counties
- 38th District: Onondaga County
- 39th District: Madison, Montgomery, Otsego and Schoharie counties
- 40th District: Broome, Chenango and Cortland counties
- 41st District: Chemung, Schuyler, Tioga and Tompkins counties
- 42nd District: Cayuga, Seneca and Wayne counties
- 43rd District: Ontario, Steuben and Yates counties
- 44th District: Allegany, Genesee, Livingston and Wyoming
- 45th and 46th District: Monroe County
- 47th District: Niagara and Orleans counties
- 48th, 49th and 50th District: Erie County
- 51st District: Cattaraugus and Chautauqua counties

=== Members ===
The asterisk (*) denotes members of the previous Legislature who continued in office as members of this Legislature. Joe R. Hanley changed from the Assembly to the Senate.

Note: For brevity, the chairmanships omit the words "...the Committee on (the)..."

District	Senator	Party	Notes
1st	George L. Thompson*	Republican	Chairman of Conservation
2nd	Joseph D. Nunan Jr.*	Democrat	
3rd	Frank B. Hendel*	Democrat	
4th	Philip M. Kleinfeld*	Democrat	
5th	John J. Howard*	Democrat	
6th	Marcellus H. Evans*	Democrat	
7th	John A. Hastings*	Democrat	
8th	William L. Love*	Democrat	
9th	Henry L. O'Brien*	Democrat	
10th	Jeremiah F. Twomey*	Democrat	
11th	James J. Crawford*	Democrat	
12th	Elmer F. Quinn*	Democrat	
13th	Thomas F. Burchill*	Democrat	
14th	Edward J. Ahearn	Democrat	elected to fill vacancy, in place of Bernard Downing
15th	John L. Buckley*	Democrat	
16th	John J. McNaboe*	Democrat	
17th	Samuel H. Hofstadter*	Republican	Chairman of General Laws
18th	John T. McCall*	Democrat	
19th	Duncan T. O'Brien*	Democrat	
20th	A. Spencer Feld*	Democrat	
21st	Henry G. Schackno*	Democrat	
22nd	Julius S. Berg*	Democrat	
23rd	John J. Dunnigan*	Democrat	Minority Leader
24th	Harry J. Palmer*	Democrat	
25th	Walter W. Westall*	Republican	Chairman of Internal Affairs
26th	Seabury C. Mastick*	Republican	Chairman of Taxation and Retrenchment
27th	Thomas C. Desmond*	Republican	Chairman of Military Affairs
28th	J. Griswold Webb*	Republican	Chairman of Public Education
29th	Arthur H. Wicks*	Republican	Chairman of Public Health
30th	William T. Byrne*	Democrat	
31st	John F. Williams*	Republican	Chairman of Affairs of Villages
32nd	Alexander G. Baxter*	Republican	Chairman of Revision
33rd	Henry E. H. Brereton*	Republican	Chairman of Civil Service
34th	Warren T. Thayer*	Republican	Chairman of Public Service
35th	Henry I. Patrie*	Republican	Chairman of Privileges and Elections
36th	Charles B. Horton*	Republican	Chairman of Printed and Engrossed Bills
37th	Perley A. Pitcher*	Republican	Chairman of Judiciary
38th	George R. Fearon*	Republican	Temporary President; Chairman of Rules
39th	John W. Gates*	Republican	Chairman of Labor and Industry
40th	Bert Lord*	Republican	Chairman of Pensions
41st	Frank A. Frost*	Republican	Chairman of Commerce and Navigation
42nd	Charles J. Hewitt*	Republican	Chairman of Finance
43rd	Leon F. Wheatley*	Republican	Chairman of Insurance
44th	Joe R. Hanley*	Republican	elected to fill vacancy, in place of John Knight; Chairman of Public Printing
45th	Cosmo A. Cilano*	Republican	Chairman of Codes
46th	Fred J. Slater*	Republican	Chairman of Penal Institutions
47th	William W. Campbell*	Republican	Chairman of Banks; Chairman of Re-Apportionment
48th	William J. Hickey*	Republican	Chairman of Cities
49th	Stephen J. Wojtkowiak*	Democrat	
50th	Nelson W. Cheney*	Republican	Chairman of Canals
51st	Leigh G. Kirkland*	Republican	Chairman of Agriculture

=== Employees ===
- Clerk: A. Miner Wellman

== State Assembly ==
=== Assemblymen ===
Note: For brevity, the chairmanships omit the words "...the Committee on (the)..."

District		Assemblymen	Party	Notes
Albany	1st	John H. Cahill*	Democrat	
Albany	2nd	John P. Hayes*	Democrat	
Albany	3rd	Rudolph I. Roulier*	Democrat	
Allegany		Harry E. Goodrich*	Republican	
Bronx	1st	Nicholas J. Eberhard*	Democrat	
Bronx	2nd	William F. Smith*	Democrat	
Bronx	3rd	Carl Pack*	Democrat	
Bronx	4th	Herman M. Albert*	Democrat	
Bronx	5th	Harry A. Samberg*	Democrat	
Bronx	6th	Christopher C. McGrath*	Democrat	
Bronx	7th	John F. Reidy*	Democrat	
Bronx	8th	John A. Devany Jr.*	Democrat	
Broome	1st	Edmund B. Jenks*	Republican	Chairman of Judiciary
Broome	2nd	Forman E. Whitcomb*	Republican	Chairman of Affairs of Cities
Cattaraugus		James W. Riley*	Rep./Soc.	
Cayuga		Fred Lewis Palmer*	Rep./Soc.	
Chautauqua	1st	Hubert E. V. Porter*	Republican	
Chautauqua	2nd	Joseph A. McGinnies*	Republican	re-elected Speaker
Chemung		G. Archie Turner*	Republican	
Chenango		Irving M. Ives*	Republican	
Clinton		Leo E. Trombly	Democrat	
Columbia		Frederick A. Washburn	Republican	
Cortland		Irving F. Rice*	Republican	
Delaware		James R. Stevenson*	Republican	
Dutchess	1st	Howard N. Allen*	Republican	
Dutchess	2nd	Charles F. Close*	Republican	
Erie	1st	Charles J. Gimbrone*	Republican	
Erie	2nd	William L. Marcy Jr.*	Republican	
Erie	3rd	Frank X. Bernhardt*	Republican	
Erie	4th	Anthony J. Canney*	Democrat	
Erie	5th	Edwin L. Kantowski*	Democrat	
Erie	6th	Howard W. Dickey*	Republican	
Erie	7th	Arthur L. Swartz*	Republican	
Erie	8th	R. Foster Piper*	Republican	
Essex		Fred L. Porter*	Republican	Chairman of Ways and Means
Franklin		James A. Latour*	Republican	
Fulton and Hamilton		Harry F. Dunkel	Republican	
Genesee		Herbert A. Rapp	Republican	
Greene		Ellis W. Bentley*	Republican	
Herkimer		Edward O. Davies	Republican	
Jefferson		Jasper W. Cornaire*	Republican	
Kings	1st	Crawford W. Hawkins*	Democrat	
Kings	2nd	Albert D. Schanzer*	Democrat	
Kings	3rd	Michael J. Gillen*	Democrat	
Kings	4th	George E. Dennen*	Democrat	
Kings	5th	John J. Cooney*	Democrat	
Kings	6th	Jacob J. Schwartzwald*	Democrat	
Kings	7th	William Kirnan*	Democrat	
Kings	8th	Luke O'Reilly*	Democrat	
Kings	9th	Daniel McNamara Jr.*	Democrat	
Kings	10th	William C. McCreery*	Democrat	
Kings	11th	Edward J. Coughlin*	Democrat	
Kings	12th	Edward S. Moran Jr.*	Democrat	
Kings	13th	William Breitenbach*	Democrat	
Kings	14th	Jacob P. Nathanson*	Democrat	
Kings	15th	Edward P. Doyle*	Democrat	
Kings	16th	Maurice Z. Bungard*	Democrat	
Kings	17th	George W. Stewart	Democrat	
Kings	18th	Irwin Steingut*	Democrat	Minority Leader
Kings	19th	Jerome G. Ambro*	Democrat	
Kings	20th	Joseph J. Monahan	Democrat	
Kings	21st	Joseph A. Esquirol*	Democrat	
Kings	22nd	Jacob H. Livingston*	Democrat	
Kings	23rd	Albert M. Cohen*	Democrat	
Lewis		Edward M. Sheldon*	Republican	
Livingston		James J. Wadsworth	Republican	
Madison		Arthur A. Hartshorn*	Republican	
Monroe	1st	Daniel J. O'Mara	Republican	
Monroe	2nd	Harry J. McKay*	Republican	
Monroe	3rd	Haskell H. Marks*	Republican	
Monroe	4th	Richard L. Saunders*	Republican	
Monroe	5th	W. Ray Austin*	Republican	
Montgomery		Rufus Richtmyer*	Republican	
Nassau	1st	Edwin W. Wallace*	Republican	
Nassau	2nd	Edwin R. Lynde*	Republican	
New York	1st	James J. Dooling*	Democrat	
New York	2nd	Millard E. Theodore*	Democrat	
New York	3rd	Sylvester A. Dineen*	Democrat	
New York	4th	Samuel Mandelbaum*	Democrat	
New York	5th	John F. Killgrew*	Democrat	
New York	6th	Irving D. Neustein*	Democrat	
New York	7th	Saul S. Streit*	Democrat	
New York	8th	Henry O. Kahan*	Democrat	died on February 6, 1932
New York	9th	Ira H. Holley*	Democrat	
New York	10th	Langdon W. Post*	Democrat	
New York	11th	Patrick H. Sullivan*	Democrat	
New York	12th	John A. Byrnes*	Democrat	
New York	13th	William J. Sheldrick*	Democrat	
New York	14th	Joseph T. Higgins*	Democrat	
New York	15th	Abbot Low Moffat*	Republican	
New York	16th	William Schwartz*	Democrat	
New York	17th	Meyer Alterman*	Democrat	
New York	18th	Sol A. Hyman*	Democrat	
New York	19th	James E. Stephens*	Democrat	
New York	20th	Louis A. Cuvillier*	Democrat	
New York	21st	David Paris*	Democrat	
New York	22nd	Benjamin B. Mittler*	Democrat	
New York	23rd	Alexander A. Falk*	Democrat	
Niagara	1st	Fayette E. Pease*	Republican	
Niagara	2nd	Roy Hewitt*	Republican	
Oneida	1st	Charles J. Peters	Republican	
Oneida	2nd	Russell G. Dunmore*	Republican	Majority Leader
Oneida	3rd	Walter W. Abbott*	Republican	
Onondaga	1st	Horace M. Stone*	Republican	
Onondaga	2nd	Willis H. Sargent*	Republican	
Onondaga	3rd	Richard B. Smith*	Republican	
Ontario		Robert A. Catchpole*	Republican	
Orange	1st	William J. Lamont*	Republican	
Orange	2nd	Rainey S. Taylor*	Republican	
Orleans		John S. Thompson*	Republican	
Oswego		Victor C. Lewis*	Republican	
Otsego		Frank M. Smith*	Republican	Chairman of Agriculture
Putnam		D. Mallory Stephens*	Republican	Chairman of Military Affairs
Queens	1st	John O'Rourke*	Democrat	
Queens	2nd	Joseph C. Mulligan*	Democrat	
Queens	3rd	Peter T. Farrell*	Democrat	
Queens	4th	James A. Burke*	Democrat	
Queens	5th	Maurice A. FitzGerald*	Democrat	
Queens	6th	Frederick L. Zimmerman*	Democrat	
Rensselaer	1st	Michael F. Breen*	Democrat	
Rensselaer	2nd	Maurice Whitney*	Republican	
Richmond	1st	Francis P. Heffernan*	Democrat	
Richmond	2nd	William L. Vaughan*	Democrat	
Rockland		Fred R. Horn Jr.*	Democrat	
St. Lawrence	1st	Rhoda Fox Graves*	Republican	
St. Lawrence	2nd	Walter L. Pratt*	Republican	
Saratoga		Burton D. Esmond*	Republican	
Schenectady	1st	Oswald D. Heck	Republican	
Schenectady	2nd	John H. Buhrmaster	Republican	
Schoharie		Kenneth H. Fake*	Republican	
Schuyler		Frank Crowe	Democrat	
Seneca		James D. Pollard*	Republican	
Steuben	1st	Wilson Messer*	Republican	
Steuben	2nd	J. Austin Otto	Republican	
Suffolk	1st	John G. Downs*	Republican	
Suffolk	2nd	Hamilton F. Potter*	Republican	
Sullivan		John T. Curtis	Republican	
Tioga		Frank G. Miller*	Republican	
Tompkins		James R. Robinson*	Republican	
Ulster		Millard Davis*	Republican	
Warren		Harry A. Reoux*	Republican	
Washington		Herbert A. Bartholomew*	Republican	
Wayne		Harry L. Averill	Republican	
Westchester	1st	Charles H. Hathaway*	Republican	
Westchester	2nd	Ralph A. Gamble*	Republican	
Westchester	3rd	Hickson F. Hart	Republican	
Westchester	4th	Alexander H. Garnjost*	Republican	
Westchester	5th	William F. Condon*	Republican	
Wyoming		Harold C. Ostertag	Republican	
Yates		Fred S. Hollowell	Republican	

=== Employees ===
- Clerk: Fred W. Hammond

== Sources ==
- Members of the New York Senate (1930s) at Political Graveyard
- Members of the New York Assembly (1930s) at Political Graveyard
