= W. Ray Austin =

American pharmacist and politician

Wallace Ray Austin (July 25, 1888 – January 15, 1962) was an American pharmacist and politician from New York.

== Life ==
Austin was born on July 25, 1888, in Spencerport, New York.

Austin graduated from Spencerport High School in 1908. He then went to the University of Rochester from 1909 to 1910, after which he went to the University of Buffalo. He graduated from the latter university in 1913. In September 1917, during World War I, he joined the Army and trained at Fort Dix, New Jersey. He was assigned to Battery D, 309th Field Artillery, and sent overseas to France in May 1918. There, he served on the front in Toul and the Battle of Saint-Mihiel. In September 1918, he was severely wounded in the Phreny raid at Saint-Michel and spent the next three months confined in hospitals at Tiul and Chatel Guyon. He was discharged at Fort Dix in May 1919.

Austin began working at Austin's Drug Store, which his father founded in the late 1800s, in 1904. He later became proprietor of the pharmacy until his retirement in 1961.

In November 1919, Austin was elected town clerk of Ogden, an office he was re-elected to in 1921. In 1922, he was elected to the New York State Assembly as a Republican, representing the Monroe County 5th District. He served in the Assembly in 1923, 1924, 1925, 1926, 1927, 1928, 1929, 1930, 1931, 1932, and 1933.

Austin was a master of the local Freemason lodge and a member of the Odd Fellows and the American Legion. He attended the Spencerport Congregational Church. His wife's name was Gertrude. Their children were Mrs. Marshall S. Walter and Edwin W.

Austin died in his vacation home in Indialantic, Florida, on January 15, 1962. He was buried in the Fairfield Cemetery in Spencerport.

New York State Assembly
Preceded by Franklin W. Judson	New York State Assembly; Monroe County, 5th District; 1923–1933	Succeeded by Donald J. Corbett
