= Robert A. Catchpole =

English-American businessman and politician

Robert Abbott Catchpole (August 17, 1865 – March 8, 1942) was an English-American businessman and politician.

== Life ==
Catchpole was born on August 17, 1865, in London, England, the son of John Grayston Catchpole and Elizabeth Abbott. The family immigrated to America in 1879 and settled in Geneva, New York, where his father established a retail meat business.

Catchpole worked in his father's meat business, called John G. Catchpole & Son. After his father's death in 1919, he took over the business. In 1921, he sold it to former employees L. D. McMann and C. E. Cowan. He was also a director of the Geneva Trust Company. He was city fire commissioner from 1896 to 1902 and park commissioner from 1904 to 1910. In 1921, he was elected mayor of Geneva, an office he held for two years.

In 1924, Catchpole was elected to the New York State Assembly as a Republican, representing Ontario County. He served in the Assembly in 1925, 1926, 1927, 1928, 1929, 1930, 1931, 1932, and 1933. In 1941, he became the city assessor.

Catchpole attended the Trinity Episcopal Church. He was a member of the Freemasons, the Royal Arch Masonry, the Elks, the Loyal Order of Moose, the Fraternal Order of Eagles, and the Chamber of Commerce. In 1889, he married Helen F. McCarthy of Stanley, New York. They had no children.

Catchpole died in Geneva General Hospital on March 8, 1942. He was buried in Glenwood Cemetery.

New York State Assembly
Preceded by Charles C. Sackett	New York State Assembly; Ontario County; 1925–1933	Succeeded by Harry R. Marble
