= 153rd New York State Legislature =

New York state legislative session

←	152nd	154th	→
- New York State Capitol (2009)

Overview
- Legislative body: New York State Legislature
- Jurisdiction: New York, United States
- Term: January 1 – December 31, 1930

Senate
- Members: 51
- President: Lt. Gov. Herbert H. Lehman (D)
- Temporary President: John Knight (R)
- Party control: Republican (27–24)

Assembly
- Members: 150
- Speaker: Joseph A. McGinnies (R)
- Party control: Republican (86–64)

Sessions
- 1st: January 1 – April 12, 1930

The 153rd New York State Legislature, consisting of the New York State Senate and the New York State Assembly, met in Albany from January 1 to April 12, 1930, during the second year of first term of Governor Franklin Delano Roosevelt

== Background ==
Under the provisions of the New York Constitution of 1894, re-apportioned in 1917, 51 Senators and 150 assemblymen were elected in single-seat districts; senators for a two-year term, assemblymen for a one-year term. The senatorial districts consisted either of one or more entire counties; or a contiguous area within a single county. The counties which were divided into more than one senatorial district were New York (nine districts), Kings (eight), Bronx (three), Erie (three), Monroe (two), Queens (two) and Westchester (two). The Assembly districts were made up of contiguous area, all within the same county.

At this time there were two major political parties: the Republican Party and the Democratic Party.

== Elections ==
The 1929 New York state election was held on November 5. No statewide elective offices were up for election.

Assemblywoman Rhoda Fox Graves (Rep.), of Gouverneur, a former school teacher who after her marriage became active in women's organisations and politics, was re-elected, and remained the only woman legislator.

== Sessions ==
The Legislature met for the regular session at the State Capitol in Albany on January 1, 1930; and adjourned at 1 a.m. on April 12.

Joseph A. McGinnies (Rep.) was re-elected Speaker.

== State Senate ==
=== Districts ===
- 1st District: Nassau and Suffolk counties
- 2nd and 3rd District: Parts of Queens County, i.e. the Borough of Queens
- 4th, 5th, 6th, 7th, 8th, 9th, 10th and 11th District: Parts of Kings County, i.e. the Borough of Brooklyn
- 12th, 13th, 14th, 15th, 16th, 17th, 18th, 19th and 20th District: Parts of New York County, i.e. the Borough of Manhattan
- 21st, 22nd and 23rd District: Parts of Bronx County, i.e. the Borough of the Bronx
- 24th District: Richmond County, i.e. the Borough of Richmond (now the Borough of Staten Island), and Rockland County
- 25th District: Part of Westchester County
- 26th District: Cortlandt, Greenburgh, Mount Pleasant, Ossining and part of Yonkers; in Westchester County
- 27th District: Orange and Sullivan counties
- 28th District: Columbia, Dutchess and Putnam counties
- 29th District: Delaware, Greene and Ulster counties
- 30th District: Albany County
- 31st District: Rensselaer County
- 32nd District: Saratoga and Schenectady counties
- 33rd District: Clinton, Essex, Warren and Washington counties
- 34th District: Franklin and St. Lawrence counties
- 35th District: Fulton, Hamilton, Herkimer and Lewis counties
- 36th District: Oneida County
- 37th District: Jefferson and Oswego counties
- 38th District: Onondaga County
- 39th District: Madison, Montgomery, Otsego and Schoharie counties
- 40th District: Broome, Chenango and Cortland counties
- 41st District: Chemung, Schuyler, Tioga and Tompkins counties
- 42nd District: Cayuga, Seneca and Wayne counties
- 43rd District: Ontario, Steuben and Yates counties
- 44th District: Allegany, Genesee, Livingston and Wyoming
- 45th and 46th District: Monroe County
- 47th District: Niagara and Orleans counties
- 48th, 49th and 50th District: Erie County
- 51st District: Cattaraugus and Chautauqua counties

=== Members ===
The asterisk (*) denotes members of the previous Legislature who continued in office as members of this Legislature. Bert Lord and Nelson W. Cheney changed from the Assembly to the Senate.

Note: For brevity, the chairmanships omit the words "...the Committee on (the)..."

District	Senator	Party	Notes
1st	George L. Thompson*	Republican	
2nd	Stephen F. Burkard*	Democrat	
3rd	Alfred J. Kennedy*	Democrat	resigned on May 1, 1930, to become Public Administrator of Queens.
4th	Philip M. Kleinfeld*	Democrat	
5th	Daniel F. Farrell*	Democrat	resigned in August 1930 to become Deputy Register of Kings Co.
6th	Marcellus H. Evans*	Democrat	
7th	John A. Hastings*	Democrat	
8th	William L. Love*	Democrat	
9th	vacant	Charles E. Russell resigned on December 3, 1929, to go on the NY Supreme Court	
9th	Henry L. O'Brien	Democrat	elected on January 9, 1930, to fill vacancy; took seat on January 20
10th	Jeremiah F. Twomey*	Democrat	
11th	James J. Crawford*	Democrat	
12th	Elmer F. Quinn*	Democrat	
13th	Thomas F. Burchill*	Democrat	
14th	Bernard Downing*	Democrat	Minority Leader
15th	John L. Buckley*	Democrat	
16th	Thomas I. Sheridan*	Democrat	
17th	Samuel H. Hofstadter*	Republican	
18th	Martin J. Kennedy*	Democrat	on March 11 elected to the 71st U.S. Congress
19th	Duncan T. O'Brien*	Democrat	
20th	A. Spencer Feld*	Democrat	
21st	Henry G. Schackno*	Democrat	
22nd	Benjamin Antin*	Democrat	
23rd	John J. Dunnigan*	Democrat	
24th	Harry J. Palmer*	Democrat	
25th	Walter W. Westall*	Republican	
26th	Seabury C. Mastick*	Republican	
27th	Caleb H. Baumes*	Republican	
28th	J. Griswold Webb*	Republican	
29th	Arthur H. Wicks*	Republican	
30th	William T. Byrne*	Democrat	
31st	John F. Williams*	Republican	
32nd	Thomas C. Brown*	Republican	
33rd	Henry E. H. Brereton*	Republican	
34th	Warren T. Thayer*	Republican	
35th	Henry I. Patrie*	Republican	
36th	Henry D. Williams*	Republican	
37th	Perley A. Pitcher*	Republican	
38th	George R. Fearon*	Republican	
39th	John W. Gates*	Republican	
40th	vacant		B. Roger Wales died on November 25, 1929
40th	Bert Lord*	Republican	elected on January 3, 1930, to fill vacancy
41st	Frank A. Frost*	Republican	
42nd	Charles J. Hewitt*	Republican	Chairman of Finance
43rd	Leon F. Wheatley*	Republican	
44th	John Knight*	Republican	Temporary President
45th	Cosmo A. Cilano*	Republican	
46th	Fred J. Slater*	Republican	
47th	William W. Campbell*	Republican	
48th	William J. Hickey*	Republican	
49th	Stephen J. Wojtkowiak*	Democrat	
50th	Nelson W. Cheney*	Republican	elected to fill vacancy, in place of Charles A. Freiberg
51st	Leigh G. Kirkland*	Republican	

=== Employees ===
- Clerk: A. Miner Wellman
- Sergeant-at-Arms: Charles R. Hotaling
- Stenographer: John K. Marshall

== State Assembly ==
=== Assemblymen ===
Note: For brevity, the chairmanships omit the words "...the Committee on (the)..."

District		Assemblymen	Party	Notes
Albany	1st	John H. Cahill	Democrat	
Albany	2nd	John P. Hayes*	Democrat	
Albany	3rd	Rudolph I. Roulier*	Democrat	
Allegany		Harry E. Goodrich	Republican	
Bronx	1st	Nicholas J. Eberhard*	Democrat	
Bronx	2nd	William F. Smith*	Democrat	
Bronx	3rd	Julius S. Berg*	Democrat	
Bronx	4th	Herman M. Albert*	Democrat	
Bronx	5th	Harry A. Samberg*	Democrat	
Bronx	6th	Christopher C. McGrath*	Democrat	
Bronx	7th	John F. Reidy*	Democrat	
Bronx	8th	John A. Devany Jr.	Democrat	
Broome	1st	Edmund B. Jenks*	Republican	Chairman of Judiciary
Broome	2nd	Forman E. Whitcomb*	Republican	Chairman of Cities
Cattaraugus		James W. Watson*	Republican	Chairman of Claims
Cayuga		Chauncey D. Van Alstine*	Republican	
Chautauqua	1st	Hubert E. V. Porter*	Republican	
Chautauqua	2nd	Joseph A. McGinnies*	Republican	re-elected Speaker; Chairman of Rules
Chemung		G. Archie Turner*	Republican	
Chenango		Bert Lord*	Republican	elected on January 3, 1930, to the State Senate
Chenango		Irving M. Ives	Republican	elected on February 18, 1930, to fill vacancy
Clinton		Charles D. Munsil*	Republican	
Columbia		Henry M. James*	Republican	Chairman of Commerce and Navigation
Cortland		Irving F. Rice*	Republican	Chairman of Public Education
Delaware		James R. Stevenson*	Republican	
Dutchess	1st	Howard N. Allen*	Republican	Chairman of Charitable and Religious Societies
Dutchess	2nd	John M. Hackett*	Republican	Chairman of Public Service
Erie	1st	Charles J. Gimbrone*	Republican	
Erie	2nd	William L. Marcy Jr.*	Republican	
Erie	3rd	Frank X. Bernhardt*	Republican	Chairman of Revision
Erie	4th	Anthony J. Canney*	Democrat	
Erie	5th	Ansley B. Borkowski*	Republican	Chairman of General Laws
Erie	6th	Howard W. Dickey*	Republican	
Erie	7th	Arthur L. Swartz*	Republican	
Erie	8th	R. Foster Piper	Republican	
Essex		Fred L. Porter*	Republican	Chairman of Re-Organization of State Government
Franklin		James A. Latour	Republican	
Fulton and Hamilton		Eberly Hutchinson*	Republican	Chairman of Ways and Means
Genesee		Charles P. Miller*	Republican	Chairman of Labor and Industries
Greene		Ellis W. Bentley*	Republican	Chairman of Conservation
Herkimer		William J. Thistlethwaite*	Republican	
Jefferson		Jasper W. Cornaire*	Republican	Chairman of Re-Apportionment
Kings	1st	Crawford W. Hawkins	Democrat	
Kings	2nd	Albert D. Schanzer	Democrat	
Kings	3rd	Michael J. Gillen*	Democrat	
Kings	4th	George E. Dennen*	Democrat	
Kings	5th	John J. Cooney*	Democrat	
Kings	6th	Jacob J. Schwartzwald*	Democrat	
Kings	7th	John J. Howard*	Democrat	
Kings	8th	Luke O'Reilly	Democrat	
Kings	9th	Daniel McNamara Jr.	Democrat	
Kings	10th	William C. McCreery*	Democrat	
Kings	11th	Edward J. Coughlin*	Democrat	
Kings	12th	Edward S. Moran Jr.*	Democrat	
Kings	13th	William Breitenbach*	Democrat	
Kings	14th	Jacob P. Nathanson*	Democrat	
Kings	15th	Edward P. Doyle*	Democrat	
Kings	16th	Maurice Z. Bungard*	Democrat	
Kings	17th	George W. Stewart	Democrat	
Kings	18th	Irwin Steingut*	Democrat	elected Minority Leader on January 20
Kings	19th	Jerome G. Ambro*	Democrat	
Kings	20th	Frank A. Miller*	Democrat	
Kings	21st	Joseph A. Esquirol*	Democrat	
Kings	22nd	Jacob H. Livingston*	Democrat	
Kings	23rd	Albert M. Cohen*	Democrat	
Lewis		Edward M. Sheldon	Republican	
Livingston		A. Grant Stockweather*	Republican	
Madison		Arthur A. Hartshorn*	Republican	Chairman of Social Welfare
Monroe	1st	Truman G. Searle	Republican	
Monroe	2nd	Harry J. McKay*	Republican	
Monroe	3rd	Haskell H. Marks*	Republican	
Monroe	4th	Richard L. Saunders*	Republican	
Monroe	5th	W. Ray Austin*	Republican	Chairman of Military Affairs
Montgomery		Rufus Richtmyer*	Republican	
Nassau	1st	Edwin W. Wallace*	Republican	Chairman of Villages
Nassau	2nd	Edwin R. Lynde*	Republican	
New York	1st	Peter J. Hamill*	Democrat	Minority Leader; died on January 13, 1930
New York	1st	James J. Dooling	Democrat	elected on March 11, 1930, to fill vacancy
New York	2nd	Millard E. Theodore	Democrat	
New York	3rd	Sylvester A. Dineen*	Democrat	
New York	4th	Samuel Mandelbaum*	Democrat	
New York	5th	Frank A. Carlin*	Democrat	
New York	6th	Louis J. Lefkowitz*	Republican	
New York	7th	Saul S. Streit*	Democrat	
New York	8th	Henry O. Kahan*	Democrat	
New York	9th	Ira H. Holley	Democrat	
New York	10th	Langdon W. Post*	Democrat	
New York	11th	Patrick H. Sullivan	Democrat	
New York	12th	John A. Byrnes*	Democrat	
New York	13th	Joseph H. Broderick	Democrat	
New York	14th	Joseph T. Higgins*	Democrat	
New York	15th	Abbot Low Moffat*	Republican	
New York	16th	William Schwartz	Democrat	
New York	17th	Meyer Alterman*	Democrat	
New York	18th	Vincent H. Auleta*	Democrat	
New York	19th	Francis E. Rivers	Republican	
New York	20th	Louis A. Cuvillier*	Democrat	
New York	21st	Lamar Perkins	Republican	
New York	22nd	Benjamin B. Mittler	Democrat	
New York	23rd	Alexander A. Falk*	Democrat	
Niagara	1st	Fayette E. Pease*	Republican	
Niagara	2nd	Roy Hewitt*	Republican	
Oneida	1st	Charles J. Peters	Republican	
Oneida	2nd	Russell G. Dunmore*	Republican	Majority Leader
Oneida	3rd	Walter W. Abbott	Republican	
Onondaga	1st	Horace M. Stone*	Republican	Chairman of Insurance
Onondaga	2nd	Willis H. Sargent*	Republican	Chairman of Banks
Onondaga	3rd	Richard B. Smith*	Republican	Chairman of Public Printing
Ontario		Robert A. Catchpole*	Republican	
Orange	1st	DeWitt C. Dominick*	Republican	
Orange	2nd	Alexander G. Hall*	Republican	
Orleans		Frank H. Lattin*	Republican	Chairman of Public Health
Oswego		Victor C. Lewis*	Republican	Chairman of Canals
Otsego		Frank M. Smith*	Republican	Chairman of Agriculture
Putnam		D. Mallory Stephens*	Republican	
Queens	1st	John O'Rourke	Democrat	
Queens	2nd	Frank B. Hendel*	Democrat	
Queens	3rd	Peter T. Farrell	Democrat	
Queens	4th	Joseph D. Nunan Jr.	Democrat	
Queens	5th	Maurice A. FitzGerald*	Democrat	
Queens	6th	Frederick L. Zimmerman	Democrat	
Rensselaer	1st	Michael F. Breen*	Democrat	
Rensselaer	2nd	Maurice Whitney*	Republican	
Richmond	1st	Francis A. Hannigan*	Democrat	
Richmond	2nd	William L. Vaughan*	Democrat	
Rockland		Fred R. Horn Jr.	Democrat	
St. Lawrence	1st	Rhoda Fox Graves*	Republican	Chairwoman of Public Institutions
St. Lawrence	2nd	Walter L. Pratt*	Republican	Chairman of Taxation
Saratoga		Burton D. Esmond*	Republican	Chairman of Codes
Schenectady	1st	Charles W. Merriam*	Republican	
Schenectady	2nd	William W. Wemple Jr.	Republican	
Schoharie		Kenneth H. Fake*	Republican	Chairman of Pensions
Schuyler		Jacob W. Winters	Republican	
Seneca		James D. Pollard	Republican	
Steuben	1st	Wilson Messer*	Republican	Chairman of Soldiers' Homes
Steuben	2nd	James T. Foody*	Republican	
Suffolk	1st	John G. Downs*	Republican	Chairman of Printed and Engrossed Bills
Suffolk	2nd	Hamilton F. Potter*	Republican	
Sullivan		J. Maxwell Knapp*	Republican	
Tioga		Frank G. Miller	Republican	
Tompkins		James R. Robinson*	Republican	
Ulster		Millard Davis*	Republican	
Warren		Paul L. Boyce*	Republican	
Washington		Herbert A. Bartholomew*	Republican	Chairman of Internal Affairs
Wayne		Harry A. Tellier*	Republican	Chairman of Excise
Westchester	1st	Charles H. Hathaway	Republican	
Westchester	2nd	Herbert B. Shonk*	Republican	Chairman of Aviation; died on September 26, 1930
Westchester	3rd	Milan E. Goodrich*	Republican	Chairman of Penal Institutions
Westchester	4th	Alexander H. Garnjost*	Republican	
Westchester	5th	William F. Condon*	Republican	
Wyoming		Joe R. Hanley*	Republican	
Yates		Edwin C. Nutt*	Republican	

=== Employees ===
- Clerk: Fred W. Hammond
- Principal Doorkeeper: Charles H. Jackson
- Second Assistant Doorkeeper: William Henry Hutchinson

== Sources ==
- Members of the New York Senate (1930s) at Political Graveyard
- Members of the New York Assembly (1930s) at Political Graveyard
- MEMBERSHIPS OF COMMITTEES OF THE ASSEMBLY in The Troy Times, of Troy, on January 7, 1930
