= 154th New York State Legislature =

New York state legislative session

←	153rd	155th	→
- New York State Capitol (2009)

Overview
- Legislative body: New York State Legislature
- Jurisdiction: New York, United States
- Term: January 1 – December 31, 1931

Senate
- Members: 51
- President: Lt. Gov. Herbert H. Lehman (D)
- Temporary President: John Knight (R), until April 9 George R. Fearon (R), from April 9
- Party control: Republican (26–25)

Assembly
- Members: 150
- Speaker: Joseph A. McGinnies (R)
- Party control: Republican (80–70)

Sessions
- 1st: January 7 – April 10, 1931
- 2nd: August 25 – September 19, 1931

The 154th New York State Legislature, consisting of the New York State Senate and the New York State Assembly, met from January 7 to September 19, 1931, during the third year of Franklin D. Roosevelt's governorship, in Albany.

== Background ==
Under the provisions of the New York Constitution of 1894, re-apportioned in 1917, 51 Senators and 150 assemblymen were elected in single-seat districts; senators for a two-year term, assemblymen for a one-year term. The senatorial districts consisted either of one or more entire counties; or a contiguous area within a single county. The counties which were divided into more than one senatorial district were New York (nine districts), Kings (eight), Bronx (three), Erie (three), Monroe (two), Queens (two), and Westchester (two). The Assembly districts were made up of contiguous area, all within the same county.

At this time there were two major political parties: the Democratic Party and the Republican Party. The Law Preservation Party, the Socialist Party, the Communist Party, and the Socialist Labor Party also nominated tickets.

== Elections ==
The 1930 New York state election was held on November 4. Governor Franklin D. Roosevelt and Lieutenant Governor Herbert H. Lehman, both Democrats, were re-elected. Of the other three statewide elective offices, two were carried by Democrats and one by a Republican judge with Democratic endorsement. The approximate party strength at this election, as expressed by the vote for Governor, was: Democrats 1,770,000; Republicans 1,045,000; Law Preservation 191,000; Socialists 100,000; Communists 18,000; and Socialist Labor 9,000.

Assemblywoman Rhoda Fox Graves (Rep.), of Gouverneur, a former school teacher who after her marriage became active in women's organisations and politics, was re-elected, and remained the only woman legislator.

== Sessions ==
The Legislature met for the regular session at the State Capitol in Albany on January 7, 1931; and adjourned on April 10.

Joseph A. McGinnies (Rep.) was re-elected Speaker.

John Knight was re-elected Temporary President of the State Senate. He was appointed to the United States District Court for the Western District of New York, and resigned as Temporary President. On April 9, George R. Fearon was elected to succeed. Knight vacated his seat on May 1 when he took office as federal judge. After the ouster of Democrat Samuel H. Miller, the election of Republican Charles B. Horton, and the death of the Democratic minority leader Bernard Downing, the Republicans continued to hold a majority of 26 to 23 in the Senate during the special session, 26 being the minimum number of votes to pass a law.

The Legislature met for a special session at the State Capitol in Albany on August 25, 1931; and adjourned on September 19. This session was called to enact legislation to provide for emergency unemployment relief.

== State Senate ==
=== Districts ===
- 1st District: Nassau and Suffolk counties
- 2nd and 3rd District: Parts of Queens County, i.e. the Borough of Queens
- 4th, 5th, 6th, 7th, 8th, 9th, 10th and 11th District: Parts of Kings County, i.e. the Borough of Brooklyn
- 12th, 13th, 14th, 15th, 16th, 17th, 18th, 19th and 20th District: Parts of New York County, i.e. the Borough of Manhattan
- 21st, 22nd and 23rd District: Parts of Bronx County, i.e. the Borough of the Bronx
- 24th District: Richmond County, i.e. the Borough of Richmond (now the Borough of Staten Island), and Rockland County
- 25th District: Part of Westchester County
- 26th District: Cortlandt, Greenburgh, Mount Pleasant, Ossining and part of Yonkers; in Westchester County
- 27th District: Orange and Sullivan counties
- 28th District: Columbia, Dutchess and Putnam counties
- 29th District: Delaware, Greene and Ulster counties
- 30th District: Albany County
- 31st District: Rensselaer County
- 32nd District: Saratoga and Schenectady counties
- 33rd District: Clinton, Essex, Warren and Washington counties
- 34th District: Franklin and St. Lawrence counties
- 35th District: Fulton, Hamilton, Herkimer and Lewis counties
- 36th District: Oneida County
- 37th District: Jefferson and Oswego counties
- 38th District: Onondaga County
- 39th District: Madison, Montgomery, Otsego and Schoharie counties
- 40th District: Broome, Chenango and Cortland counties
- 41st District: Chemung, Schuyler, Tioga and Tompkins counties
- 42nd District: Cayuga, Seneca and Wayne counties
- 43rd District: Ontario, Steuben and Yates counties
- 44th District: Allegany, Genesee, Livingston and Wyoming
- 45th and 46th District: Monroe County
- 47th District: Niagara and Orleans counties
- 48th, 49th and 50th District: Erie County
- 51st District: Cattaraugus and Chautauqua counties

=== Members ===
The asterisk (*) denotes members of the previous Legislature who continued in office as members of this Legislature. Joseph D. Nunan Jr, Frank B. Hendel, John J. Howard and Julius S. Berg changed from the Assembly to the Senate.

Note: For brevity, the chairmanships omit the words "...the Committee on (the)..."; Chairmanships as appointed at the beginning of the session

District	Senator	Party	Notes
1st	George L. Thompson*	Republican	re-elected; Chairman of Conservation
2nd	Joseph D. Nunan Jr.*	Democrat	
3rd	Frank B. Hendel*	Democrat	
4th	Philip M. Kleinfeld*	Democrat	re-elected
5th	John J. Howard*	Democrat	
6th	Marcellus H. Evans*	Democrat	re-elected
7th	John A. Hastings*	Democrat	re-elected
8th	William L. Love*	Democrat	re-elected
9th	Henry L. O'Brien*	Democrat	re-elected
10th	Jeremiah F. Twomey*	Democrat	re-elected
11th	James J. Crawford*	Democrat	re-elected
12th	Elmer F. Quinn*	Democrat	re-elected
13th	Thomas F. Burchill*	Democrat	re-elected
14th	Bernard Downing*	Democrat	re-elected; Minority Leader; died on May 25, 1931
15th	John L. Buckley*	Democrat	re-elected
16th	John J. McNaboe	Democrat	
17th	Samuel H. Hofstadter*	Republican	re-elected; Chairman of General Laws
18th	John T. McCall	Democrat	
19th	Duncan T. O'Brien*	Democrat	re-elected
20th	A. Spencer Feld*	Democrat	re-elected
21st	Henry G. Schackno*	Democrat	re-elected
22nd	Julius S. Berg*	Democrat	
23rd	John J. Dunnigan*	Democrat	re-elected; Minority Leader from August 25
24th	Harry J. Palmer*	Democrat	re-elected
25th	Walter W. Westall*	Republican	re-elected; Chairman of Internal Affairs
26th	Seabury C. Mastick*	Republican	re-elected; Chairman of Taxation and Retrenchment
27th	Thomas C. Desmond	Republican	Chairman of Public Printing
28th	J. Griswold Webb*	Republican	re-elected; Chairman of Public Education
29th	Arthur H. Wicks*	Republican	re-elected; Chairman of Public Health
30th	William T. Byrne*	Democrat	re-elected
31st	John F. Williams*	Republican	re-elected; Chairman of Affairs of Villages
32nd	Alexander G. Baxter	Republican	Chairman of Revision
33rd	Henry E. H. Brereton*	Republican	re-elected; Chairman of Civil Service
34th	Warren T. Thayer*	Republican	re-elected; Chairman of Public Service
35th	Henry I. Patrie*	Republican	re-elected; Chairman of Privileges and Elections
36th	Samuel H. Miller	Democrat	contested by William S. Murray (R); seat vacated on March 31
36th	Charles B. Horton	Republican	elected on May 5 to fill vacancy
37th	Perley A. Pitcher*	Republican	re-elected; Chairman of Codes
38th	George R. Fearon*	Republican	re-elected; Chairman of Judiciary; on April 9, elected Temporary President
39th	John W. Gates*	Republican	re-elected; Chairman of Labor and Industry
40th	Bert Lord*	Republican	re-elected; Chairman of Pensions
41st	Frank A. Frost*	Republican	re-elected; Chairman of Commerce and Navigation; Chairman of Printed and Engrossed Bills
42nd	Charles J. Hewitt*	Republican	re-elected; Chairman of Finance
43rd	Leon F. Wheatley*	Republican	re-elected; Chairman of Insurance
44th	John Knight*	Republican	re-elected; re-elected Temporary President; Chairman of Rules; on March 30, appointed to the U.S. Court for the Western D. of NY
45th	Cosmo A. Cilano*	Republican	re-elected; Chairman of Military Affairs
46th	Fred J. Slater*	Republican	re-elected; Chairman of Penal Institutions
47th	William W. Campbell*	Republican	re-elected; Chairman of Banks; Chairman of Re-Apportionment
48th	William J. Hickey*	Republican	re-elected; Chairman of Cities
49th	Stephen J. Wojtkowiak*	Democrat	re-elected
50th	Nelson W. Cheney*	Republican	re-elected; Chairman of Canals
51st	Leigh G. Kirkland*	Republican	re-elected; Chairman of Agriculture

=== Employees ===
- Clerk: A. Miner Wellman

== State Assembly ==
=== Assemblymen ===
Note: For brevity, the chairmanships omit the words "...the Committee on (the)..."

District		Assemblymen	Party	Notes
Albany	1st	John H. Cahill*	Democrat	
Albany	2nd	John P. Hayes*	Democrat	
Albany	3rd	Rudolph I. Roulier*	Democrat	
Allegany		Harry E. Goodrich*	Republican	
Bronx	1st	Nicholas J. Eberhard*	Democrat	
Bronx	2nd	William F. Smith*	Democrat	
Bronx	3rd	Carl Pack	Democrat	
Bronx	4th	Herman M. Albert*	Democrat	
Bronx	5th	Harry A. Samberg*	Democrat	
Bronx	6th	Christopher C. McGrath*	Democrat	
Bronx	7th	John F. Reidy*	Democrat	
Bronx	8th	John A. Devany Jr.*	Democrat	
Broome	1st	Edmund B. Jenks*	Republican	Chairman of Judiciary
Broome	2nd	Forman E. Whitcomb*	Republican	Chairman of Cities
Cattaraugus		James W. Riley	Republican	
Cayuga		Fred Lewis Palmer	Republican	
Chautauqua	1st	Hubert E. V. Porter*	Republican	
Chautauqua	2nd	Joseph A. McGinnies*	Republican	re-elected Speaker; Chairman of Rules
Chemung		G. Archie Turner*	Republican	
Chenango		Irving M. Ives*	Republican	
Clinton		Charles D. Munsil*	Republican	
Columbia		Charles S. Fayerweather	Democrat	
Cortland		Irving F. Rice*	Republican	Chairman of Public Education
Delaware		James R. Stevenson*	Republican	
Dutchess	1st	Howard N. Allen*	Republican	Chairman of Charitable and Religious Societies
Dutchess	2nd	Charles F. Close	Republican	
Erie	1st	Charles J. Gimbrone*	Republican	Chairman of Aviation
Erie	2nd	William L. Marcy Jr.*	Republican	
Erie	3rd	Frank X. Bernhardt*	Republican	Chairman of Revision
Erie	4th	Anthony J. Canney*	Democrat	
Erie	5th	Edwin L. Kantowski	Democrat	
Erie	6th	Howard W. Dickey*	Republican	Chairman of General Laws
Erie	7th	Arthur L. Swartz*	Republican	
Erie	8th	R. Foster Piper*	Republican	
Essex		Fred L. Porter*	Republican	Chairman of Re-Organization of State Government
Franklin		James A. Latour*	Republican	
Fulton and Hamilton		Eberly Hutchinson*	Republican	Chairman of Ways and Means
Genesee		Charles P. Miller*	Republican	Chairman of Labor and Industries
Greene		Ellis W. Bentley*	Republican	Chairman of Conservation
Herkimer		William J. Thistlethwaite*	Republican	
Jefferson		Jasper W. Cornaire*	Republican	Chairman of Re-Apportionment
Kings	1st	Crawford W. Hawkins*	Democrat	
Kings	2nd	Albert D. Schanzer*	Democrat	
Kings	3rd	Michael J. Gillen*	Democrat	
Kings	4th	George E. Dennen*	Democrat	
Kings	5th	John J. Cooney*	Democrat	
Kings	6th	Jacob J. Schwartzwald*	Democrat	
Kings	7th	William Kirnan	Democrat	
Kings	8th	Luke O'Reilly*	Democrat	
Kings	9th	Daniel McNamara Jr.*	Democrat	
Kings	10th	William C. McCreery*	Democrat	
Kings	11th	Edward J. Coughlin*	Democrat	
Kings	12th	Edward S. Moran Jr.*	Democrat	
Kings	13th	William Breitenbach*	Democrat	
Kings	14th	Jacob P. Nathanson*	Democrat	
Kings	15th	Edward P. Doyle*	Democrat	
Kings	16th	Maurice Z. Bungard*	Democrat	
Kings	17th	Robert K. Story Jr.	Republican	
Kings	18th	Irwin Steingut*	Democrat	Minority Leader
Kings	19th	Jerome G. Ambro*	Democrat	
Kings	20th	Frank A. Miller*	Democrat	died on June 25, 1931
Kings	21st	Joseph A. Esquirol*	Democrat	
Kings	22nd	Jacob H. Livingston*	Democrat	
Kings	23rd	Albert M. Cohen*	Democrat	
Lewis		Edward M. Sheldon*	Republican	
Livingston		A. Grant Stockweather*	Republican	
Madison		Arthur A. Hartshorn*	Republican	Chairman of Social Welfare
Monroe	1st	Truman G. Searle*	Republican	
Monroe	2nd	Harry J. McKay*	Republican	
Monroe	3rd	Haskell H. Marks*	Republican	
Monroe	4th	Richard L. Saunders*	Republican	
Monroe	5th	W. Ray Austin*	Republican	Chairman of Public Health
Montgomery		Rufus Richtmyer*	Republican	
Nassau	1st	Edwin W. Wallace*	Republican	Chairman of Affairs of Villages
Nassau	2nd	Edwin R. Lynde*	Republican	
New York	1st	James J. Dooling*	Democrat	
New York	2nd	Millard E. Theodore*	Democrat	
New York	3rd	Sylvester A. Dineen*	Democrat	
New York	4th	Samuel Mandelbaum*	Democrat	
New York	5th	John F. Killgrew	Democrat	
New York	6th	Irving D. Neustein	Democrat	
New York	7th	Saul S. Streit*	Democrat	
New York	8th	Henry O. Kahan*	Democrat	
New York	9th	Ira H. Holley*	Democrat	
New York	10th	Langdon W. Post*	Democrat	
New York	11th	Patrick H. Sullivan*	Democrat	
New York	12th	John A. Byrnes*	Democrat	
New York	13th	William J. Sheldrick	Democrat	
New York	14th	Joseph T. Higgins*	Democrat	
New York	15th	Abbot Low Moffat*	Republican	
New York	16th	William Schwartz*	Democrat	
New York	17th	Meyer Alterman*	Democrat	
New York	18th	Sol A. Hyman	Democrat	
New York	19th	James E. Stephens	Democrat	
New York	20th	Louis A. Cuvillier*	Democrat	
New York	21st	David Paris	Democrat	
New York	22nd	Benjamin B. Mittler*	Democrat	
New York	23rd	Alexander A. Falk*	Democrat	
Niagara	1st	Fayette E. Pease*	Republican	
Niagara	2nd	Roy Hewitt*	Republican	
Oneida	1st	Mark C. Kelly	Democrat	
Oneida	2nd	Russell G. Dunmore*	Republican	Majority Leader
Oneida	3rd	Walter W. Abbott*	Republican	
Onondaga	1st	Horace M. Stone*	Republican	Chairman of Insurance
Onondaga	2nd	Willis H. Sargent*	Republican	Chairman of Banks
Onondaga	3rd	Richard B. Smith*	Republican	Chairman of Public Printing
Ontario		Robert A. Catchpole*	Republican	Chairman of Public Service
Orange	1st	William J. Lamont	Republican	
Orange	2nd	Rainey S. Taylor	Republican	
Orleans		John S. Thompson	Republican	
Oswego		Victor C. Lewis*	Republican	Chairman of Canals
Otsego		Frank M. Smith*	Republican	Chairman of Agriculture
Putnam		D. Mallory Stephens*	Republican	Chairman of Military Affairs
Queens	1st	John O'Rourke*	Democrat	
Queens	2nd	Joseph C. Mulligan	Democrat	
Queens	3rd	Peter T. Farrell*	Democrat	
Queens	4th	James A. Burke	Democrat	
Queens	5th	Maurice A. FitzGerald*	Democrat	
Queens	6th	Frederick L. Zimmerman*	Democrat	
Rensselaer	1st	Michael F. Breen*	Democrat	
Rensselaer	2nd	Maurice Whitney*	Republican	Chairman of Commerce and Navigation
Richmond	1st	Francis P. Heffernan	Democrat	
Richmond	2nd	William L. Vaughan*	Democrat	
Rockland		Fred R. Horn Jr.*	Democrat	
St. Lawrence	1st	Rhoda Fox Graves*	Republican	Chairwoman of Public Institutions
St. Lawrence	2nd	Walter L. Pratt*	Republican	Chairman of Taxation and Retrenchment
Saratoga		Burton D. Esmond*	Republican	Chairman of Codes
Schenectady	1st	Charles W. Merriam*	Republican	
Schenectady	2nd	William W. Wemple Jr.*	Republican	
Schoharie		Kenneth H. Fake*	Republican	Chairman of Pensions
Schuyler		Jacob W. Winters*	Republican	
Seneca		James D. Pollard*	Republican	
Steuben	1st	Wilson Messer*	Republican	Chairman of Soldiers' Homes
Steuben	2nd	James T. Foody*	Republican	
Suffolk	1st	John G. Downs*	Republican	
Suffolk	2nd	Hamilton F. Potter*	Republican	
Sullivan		William Whittaker	Democrat	
Tioga		Frank G. Miller*	Republican	
Tompkins		James R. Robinson*	Republican	Chairman of Claims
Ulster		Millard Davis*	Republican	
Warren		Harry A. Reoux	Republican	
Washington		Herbert A. Bartholomew*	Republican	Chairman of Internal Affairs
Wayne		Harry A. Tellier*	Republican	Chairman of Excise
Westchester	1st	Charles H. Hathaway*	Republican	
Westchester	2nd	Ralph A. Gamble	Republican	
Westchester	3rd	Milan E. Goodrich*	Republican	Chairman of Penal Institutions
Westchester	4th	Alexander H. Garnjost*	Republican	
Westchester	5th	William F. Condon*	Republican	
Wyoming		Joe R. Hanley*	Republican	
Yates		Edwin C. Nutt*	Republican	

=== Employees ===
- Clerk: Fred W. Hammond

== Sources ==
- Members of the New York Senate (1930s) at Political Graveyard
- Members of the New York Assembly (1930s) at Political Graveyard
- G.O.P. SENATE, ASSEMBLY, PICK COMMITTEES in The Morning Herald, of Gloversville and Johnstown, on January 13, 1931 (front page)
- G.O.P. NAMES COMMITTEES in The Morning Herald, of Gloversville and Johnstown, on January 13, 1931 (page 3)
