= Edward V. Loughlin =

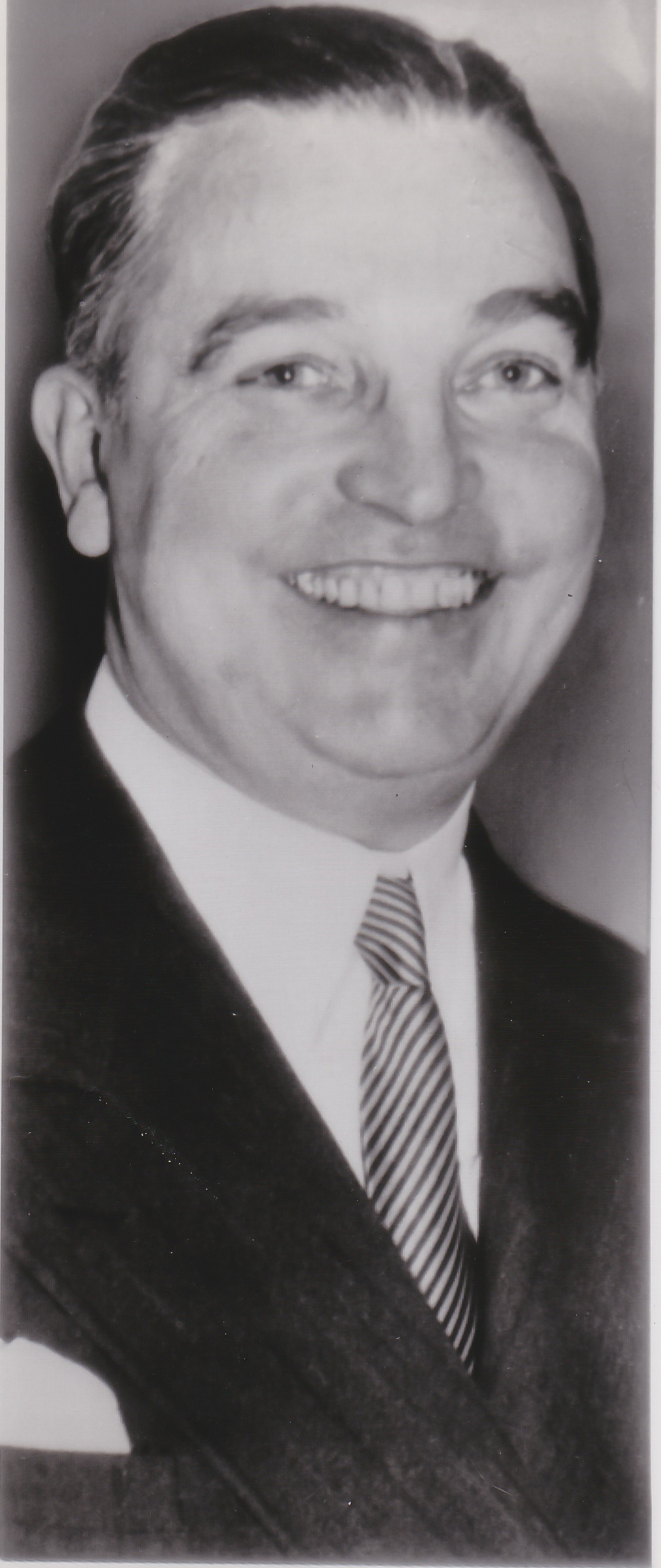
Edward V Loughlin was Tammany Hall Leader from 1944 - 1947.

Edward V. Loughlin (1894-1969) was a veteran, educator, lawyer, politician and advisor to U.S. Presidents.

== Biography ==
Loughlin served in the United States Army during World War I. He was a prominent figure in the educational landscape from 1914 to 1925. He wore many hats during his career, serving as a teacher, principal, and also a guidance counselor. While teaching he attended and graduated from Fordham University in 1918. Loughlin then attended Columbia University Law School, where he graduated with his Law Degree in 1921. Loughlin was involved in politics early. He was affiliated with Tammany Hall as a Committeeman in his local district as well as the local New York County Democrat organization. That involvement helped position him for his next political step. In 1925 he was appointed Manhattan Assistant District Attorney. He held that position until he was elected to the 156th New York State Legislature as Assemblyman from the 14th district in 1933. He was also secretary to Supreme Court Justice Ferdinand Pecora. Loughlin was a delegate to the Democratic National Convention from New York in 1936 (alternate), 1944, as well as 1964. Loughlin was the Manhattan Democrat Leader from January 1944 to March 1947.

On January 29, 1944 Loughlin was elected Tammany Hall Leader. Tammany Hall was the political machine of the Democratic Party and played a major role in controlling New York City and New York State politics, and helped immigrants, most notably the Irish, rise in American politics from the 1850s into the 1960s.

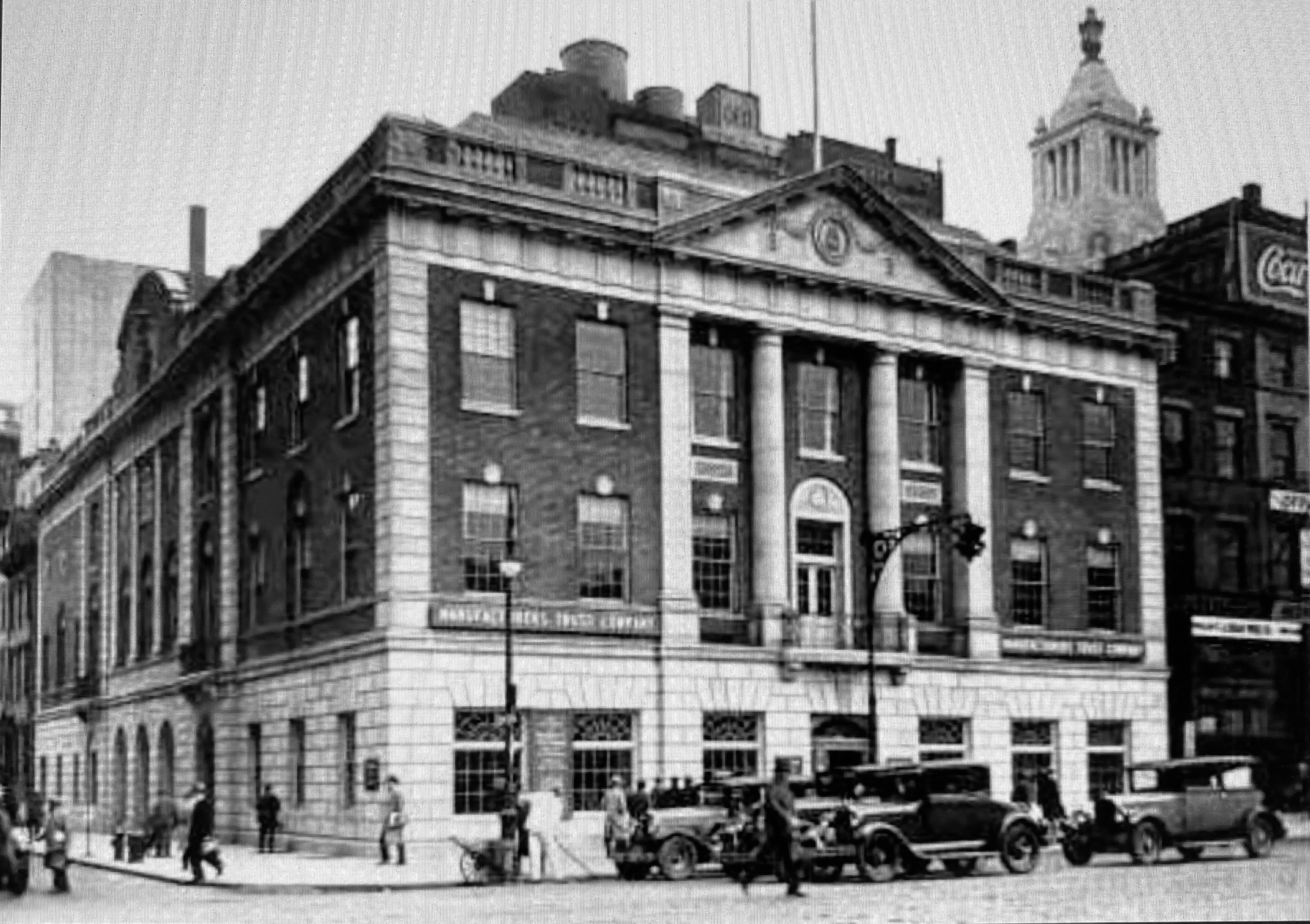
Tammany Hall, New York City 1944

Loughlin became Leader of Tammany Hall when he and a group of district leaders revolted against the leadership of the current Leader, Michael J. Kennedy. Loughlin formally took over the leadership of Tammany Hall on February 1, 1944. Loughlin was quoted in his acceptance speech saying, "No act of mine, as Leader or otherwise, will cause anyone to regret the honor conferred upon me." All of the Tammany district leaders, as well as a large number of other Democrats visited Loughlin at Tammany headquarters, located at 331 Madison Avenue New York City, to pledge their support and cooperation. When elected Tammany Hall Leader, Loughlin was Tammany district leader in the 14th Assembly district, which covered Yorkville and the Upper East Side area of Manhattan. The day Loughlin became Tammany Leader he resigned as Secretary to Supreme Court Justice Ferdinand Pecora.

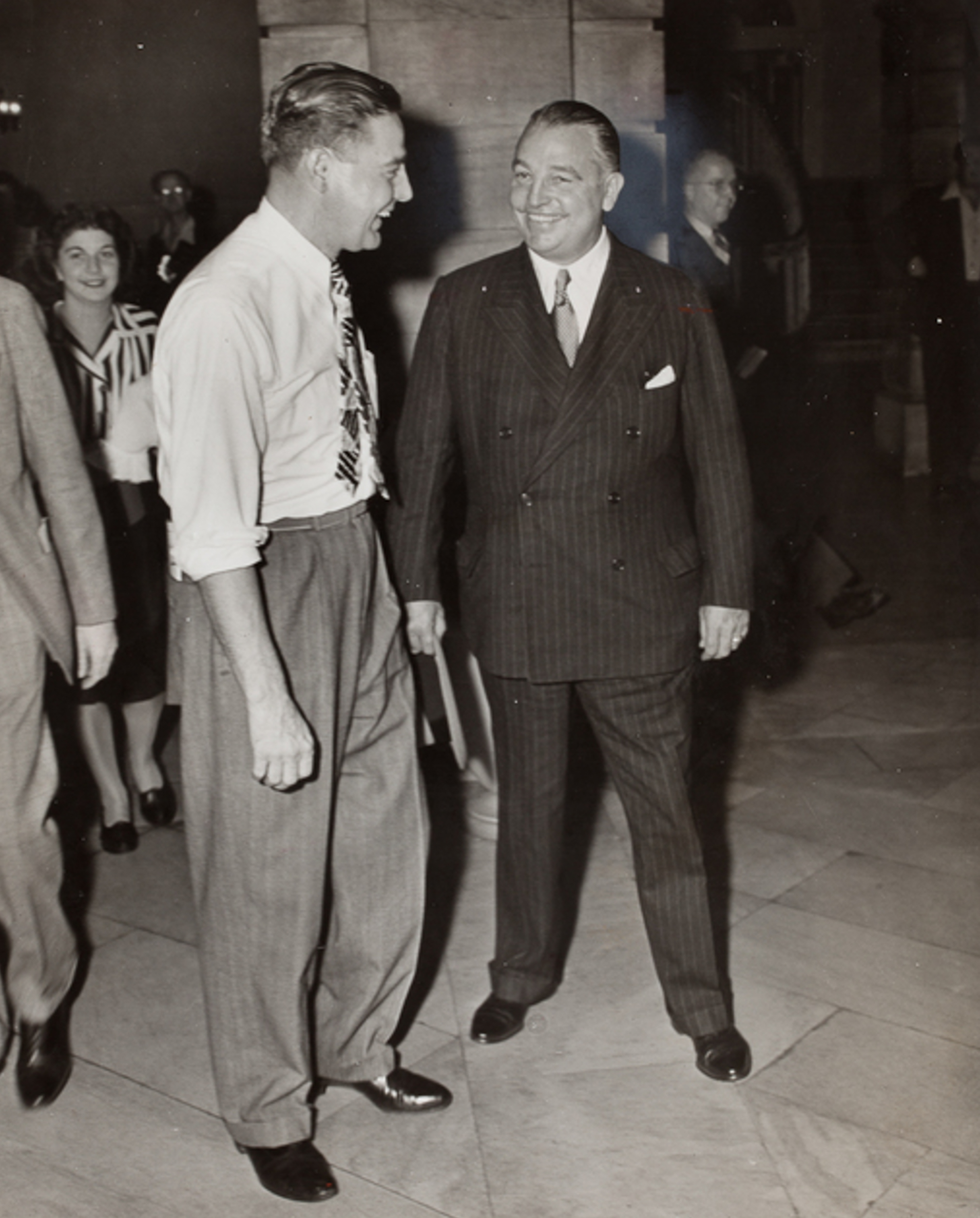
Tammany Hall Leader Edward V. Loughlin with New York City Mayor William O'Dwyer 1946

At the height of his influence in the mid 1940s, Loughlin was credited with handpicking William O'Dwyer as the 100th mayor of New York City. On December 5, 1944, Loughlin indicated that Tammany Hall would choose next year's Democratic nomination for Mayor of New York City. He did so with the backing of Edward Flynn, Democratic Leader of the Bronx and Frank Kelly, Democratic Leader from Brooklyn. In 1945, William O'Dwyer received the indorsement of Tammany Hall Leader Edward V. Loughlin. O’Dwyer won the Democratic nomination, and then easily defeated the 3-term incumbent Mayor Fiorello La Guardia.

Growing up in New York City, as well as his steeped understanding of New York politics, gave Loughlin a valued perspective of the social and political landscape that other leaders from around the country sought. On August 17, 1944, Chicago Mayor Edward J Kelly flew to New York to confer with Loughlin at Tammany headquarters at 331 Madison Ave. to discuss current political and social issues.

During Loughlin's legal and political ascent, he and Franklin Delano Roosevelt became friends and confidants. Both attended Columbia Law School and had law firms close to each other in New York City. Loughlin's Law firm was located at 295 Madison Avenue. FDR's law firm was located at 120 Broadway. While Loughlin represented the 14th District in the New York Assembly, Roosevelt was the Governor of New York. The relationship between Loughlin and Roosevelt followed the latter to the White House when he was elected 32nd President of the United States. Roosevelt maintained his connection to his home state through Loughlin's advice.

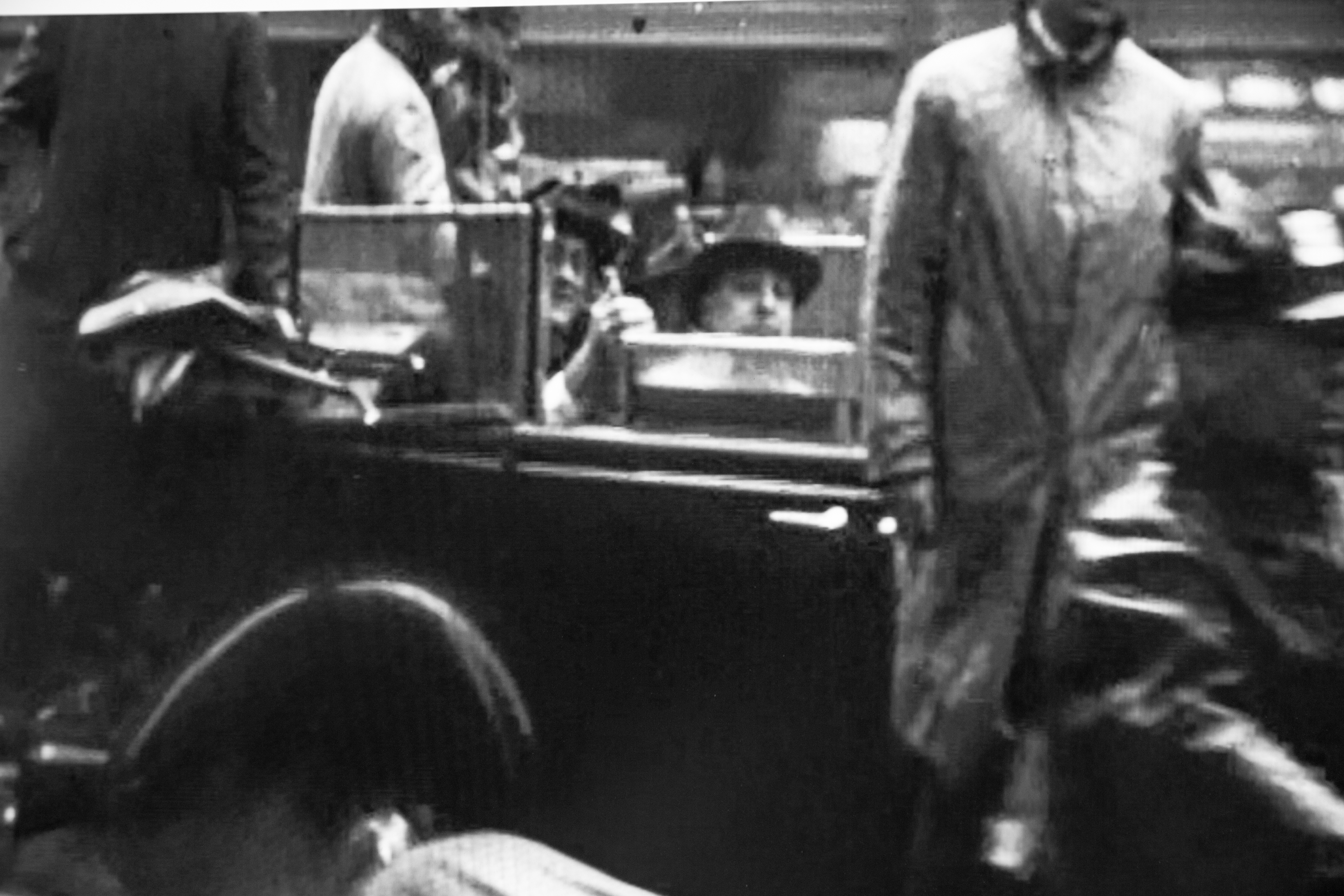
Tammany Hall Leader Edward V. Loughlin riding in the Presidential car with President Roosevelt during a ticker tape parade in New York City on October 1, 1944.

On October 1, 1944, President Roosevelt visited New York City to participate in a ticker tape parade in his honor. Despite a steady rain and advice from his doctors, Roosevelt insisted an open car to drive through New York City. An estimated two million New Yorkers lined the 50-mile route through New York City and the surrounding Burroughs to cheer on the President. Tammany Hall Leader Loughlin accompanied the president in the presidential car and was seated directly in front of President Roosevelt. Roosevelt relied on Loughlin to wield his knowledge of New York politics and his authority in New York State to turn out voters in support for Roosevelt's Presidential campaign.

Loughlin wrote the letter drafting Roosevelt to his unprecedented 4th term as president. Tammany Leader Loughlin and his choices for Delegates to attend the Democratic National Convention were unanimous in the renomination of Roosevelt. While in Washington D.C., Loughlin met with Democratic party leaders from around the country, where he called for the drafting of President Roosevelt to a 4th term.

Loughlin was quoted as saying "We Democrats in New York support without reservation President Roosevelt and his policies. We believe he must run regardless of his personal wishes because the people need him, the soldiers, sailors and marines need him as Commander in Chief and a gravely troubled world needs his wisdom and expertise in the planning of an enduring peace." "It is appropriate that New York, the Presidents home state, should take the lead in the movement to draft Franklin D Roosevelt. This is a responsibility which the Democrats of New York City and New York State gladly assume." Roosevelt won his fourth term as President of the United States on November 7, 1944.

After Roosevelt's death on April 12, 1945, Harry S Truman was sworn in as the 33rd President of the United States. President Truman maintained the advisory connection with Tammany Leader Loughlin. President Truman frequented New York City to seek the advice of Loughlin's perspective regarding New York State and national politics. President Truman routinely requested Loughlin's company at the White House for advice on a myriad of social and political issues. Loughlin remained an advisor to President Truman for the remainder of his term.

Loughlin stepped down as Tammany Hall Leader in March 1947. He then devoted the majority of his time to his law firm located at 295 Madison Avenue in New York City, and remained politically active until he died in 1969.

== Family history ==
Loughlin was born in Yorkville, Manhattan to Mr. Thomas K. Loughlin and Mrs. Mary A. J. Loughlin of New York City and Westhampton, Long Island of Catholic and Irish descent.

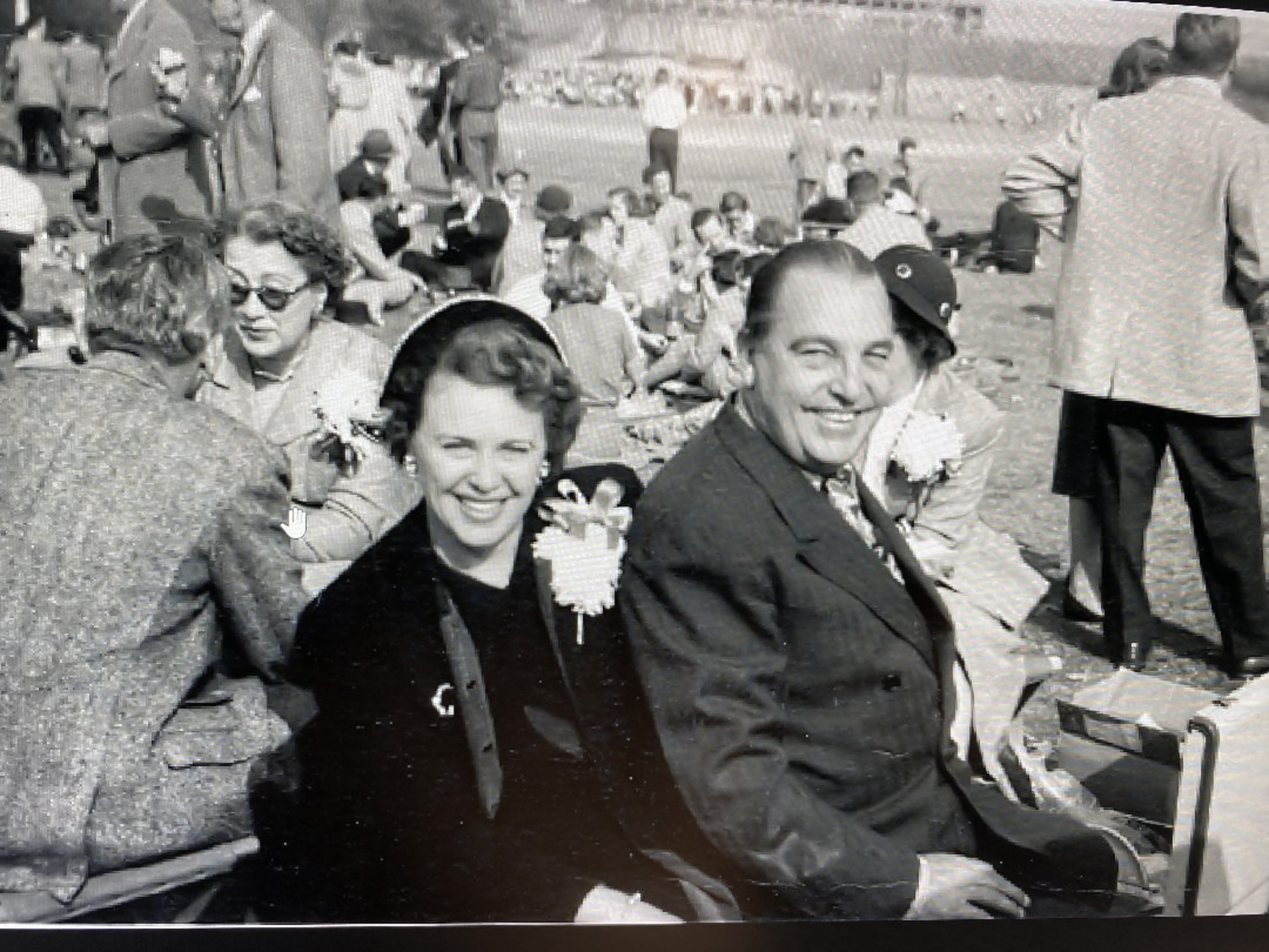
Madge and Edward Loughlin enjoying a midday picnic with friends.

He married Madge Beatrice Lessing, daughter to Mr. and Mrs. Lawrence Lessing of New York City and Bayport, Long Island. The Lessing's hosted a formal dinner at the Canoe Place Inn in Shinnecock Hills, Long Island July 16, 1932, to announce the engagement of their daughter, Madge Lessing to Manhattan Assistant District Attorney Edward V. Loughlin of New York City. Miss Lessing graduated from the Academy of St. Joseph in Brentwood, N.Y., and attended Miss Finch's School in New York City. On the maternal side Miss Lessing is a descendant of Colonel John Nielson, an officer in the Revolutionary War, and the niece of Sir Herbert Graves, past Chief Justice of the British West Indies.

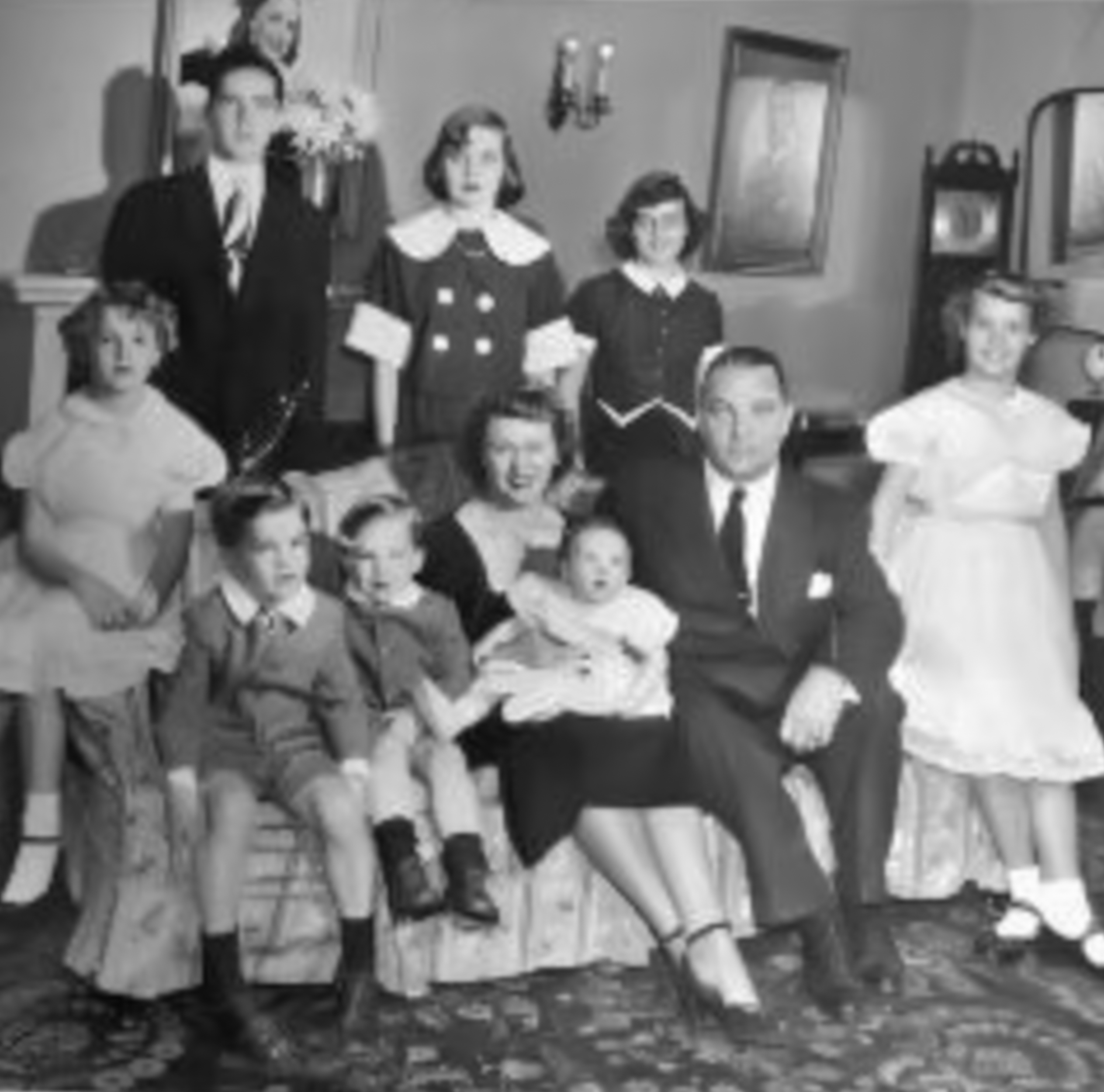
The Loughlin family on Mother's Day 1950. Manhattan's "Typical American Family".

The Loughlin's resided at 242 East 72nd St on the Upper East Side of Manhattan. In June 1941 the family were selected as Manhattan's "Typical American Family" by the Merchants Association of the Upper East Side of New York City.

The Loughlin's had eight children: Edward Loughlin Jr., Madge Hubbard, Mary Lee Dombrowski, Mona Kerins, Maureen Smith, Thomas Loughlin, Lawrence Loughlin and Melinda Cicoff.

Loughlin was a member of the America Legion, Friendly Sons of St. Patrick, Ancient Order of Hibernians, the National Democratic Club, the Manhattan Club, the New York Athletic Club and the Swordfish Club of Westhampton.

In Loughlin's later years, he enjoyed spending time at his family home in Bellport, Long Island with his children and many grandchildren. Summers were spent at the Swordfish Club in Westhampton where his grandchildren learned how to swim, dive and frolic in the Atlantic Ocean.

Loughlin died at Brookhaven Memorial Hospital, East Patchogue, New York on November 18, 1969, at the age of 75. Interment was at Calvary Cemetery, Woodside, Queens, N.Y.
