= Lamar Perkins =

American politician

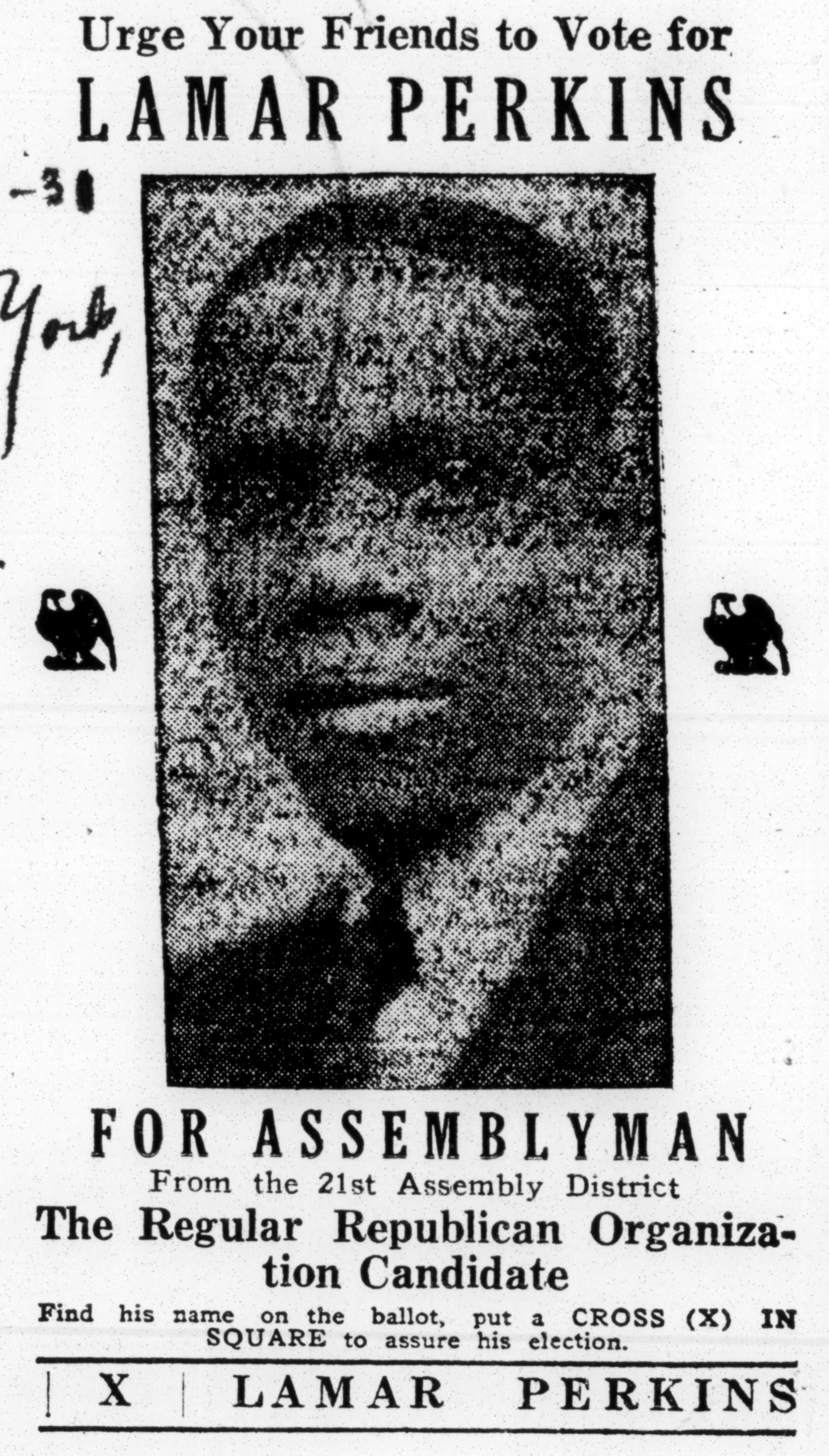
Perkins c. 1931

Lamar Perkins (1896–?) was a state legislator in New York.

He was born in Georgia. He represented Harlem. He was a Republican. His photograph appeared in The Crisis along with other "Black Rulers".

New York State Assembly
Preceded by John W. Remer	New York State Assembly; Schenectady County, 21st District; 1930	Succeeded by David Paris
