= 149th New York State Legislature =

New York state legislative session

←	148th	150th	→
- New York State Capitol (2009)

Overview
- Legislative body: New York State Legislature
- Jurisdiction: New York, United States
- Term: January 1 – December 31, 1926

Senate
- Members: 51
- President: Lt. Gov. Seymour Lowman (R)
- Temporary President: John Knight (R)
- Party control: Republican (29–22)

Assembly
- Members: 150
- Speaker: Joseph A. McGinnies (R)
- Party control: Republican (91–59)

Sessions
- 1st: January 6 – April 23, 1926

The 149th New York State Legislature, consisting of the New York State Senate and the New York State Assembly, met from January 6 to April 23, 1926, during the fourth year of Al Smith's second tenure as Governor of New York, in Albany.

== Background ==
Under the provisions of the New York Constitution of 1894, re-apportioned in 1917, 51 Senators and 150 assemblymen were elected in single-seat districts; senators for a two-year term, assemblymen for a one-year term. The senatorial districts consisted either of one or more entire counties; or a contiguous area within a single county. The counties which were divided into more than one senatorial district were New York (nine districts), Kings (eight), Bronx (three), Erie (three), Monroe (two), Queens (two) and Westchester (two). The Assembly districts were made up of contiguous area, all within the same county.

At this time there were two major political parties: the Republican Party and the Democratic Party.

== Elections ==
The 1925 New York state election was held on November 3. No statewide elective offices were up for election.

Assemblywoman Rhoda Fox Graves (Rep.), of Gouverneur, a former school teacher who after her marriage became active in women's organizations and politics, was re-elected, and remained the only woman legislator.

== Sessions ==
The Legislature met for the regular session at the State Capitol in Albany on January 6, 1926; and adjourned on April 23.

Joseph A. McGinnies (Rep.) was re-elected Speaker.

== State Senate ==
=== Districts ===
- 1st District: Nassau and Suffolk counties
- 2nd and 3rd District: Parts of Queens County, i.e. the Borough of Queens
- 4th, 5th, 6th, 7th, 8th, 9th, 10th and 11th District: Parts of Kings County, i.e. the Borough of Brooklyn
- 12th, 13th, 14th, 15th, 16th, 17th, 18th, 19th and 20th District: Parts of New York County, i.e. the Borough of Manhattan
- 21st, 22nd and 23rd District: Parts of Bronx County, i.e. the Borough of the Bronx
- 24th District: Richmond County, i.e. the Borough of Richmond (now the Borough of Staten Island), and Rockland County
- 25th District: Part of Westchester County
- 26th District: Cortlandt, Greenburgh, Mount Pleasant, Ossining and part of Yonkers; in Westchester County
- 27th District: Orange and Sullivan counties
- 28th District: Columbia, Dutchess and Putnam counties
- 29th District: Delaware, Greene and Ulster counties
- 30th District: Albany County
- 31st District: Rensselaer County
- 32nd District: Saratoga and Schenectady counties
- 33rd District: Clinton, Essex, Warren and Washington counties
- 34th District: Franklin and St. Lawrence counties
- 35th District: Fulton, Hamilton, Herkimer and Lewis counties
- 36th District: Oneida County
- 37th District: Jefferson and Oswego counties
- 38th District: Onondaga County
- 39th District: Madison, Montgomery, Otsego and Schoharie counties
- 40th District: Broome, Chenango and Cortland counties
- 41st District: Chemung, Schuyler, Tioga and Tompkins counties
- 42nd District: Cayuga, Seneca and Wayne counties
- 43rd District: Ontario, Steuben and Yates counties
- 44th District: Allegany, Genesee, Livingston and Wyoming
- 45th and 46th District: Monroe County
- 47th District: Niagara and Orleans counties
- 48th, 49th and 50th District: Erie County
- 51st District: Cattaraugus and Chautauqua counties

=== Members ===
The asterisk (*) denotes members of the previous Legislature who continued in office as members of this Legislature.

Note: For brevity, the chairmanships omit the words "...the Committee on (the)..."

District	Senator	Party	Notes
1st	George L. Thompson*	Republican	
2nd	John L. Karle*	Republican	
3rd	Peter J. McGarry*	Democrat	on November 2, 1926, elected Register of Queens Co.
4th	Philip M. Kleinfeld*	Democrat	
5th	Daniel F. Farrell*	Democrat	
6th	James A. Higgins*	Democrat	
7th	John A. Hastings*	Democrat	
8th	William L. Love*	Democrat	
9th	vacant	Frank E. Johnson was elected on November 3, 1925, to the Municipal Court	
9th	Charles E. Russell	Democrat	elected on January 7 to fill vacancy
10th	Jeremiah F. Twomey*	Democrat	
11th	Daniel J. Carroll*	Democrat	
12th	vacant	Jimmy Walker was elected on November 3, 1925, as Mayor of New York City	
12th	Elmer F. Quinn	Democrat	elected on January 7 to fill vacancy
13th	Thomas F. Burchill*	Democrat	
14th	Bernard Downing*	Democrat	Minority Leader
15th	Nathan Straus Jr.*	Democrat	
16th	Thomas I. Sheridan*	Democrat	
17th	Courtlandt Nicoll*	Republican	
18th	Martin J. Kennedy*	Democrat	
19th	Duncan T. O'Brien*	Democrat	
20th	Michael E. Reiburn*	Democrat	
21st	Henry G. Schackno*	Democrat	
22nd	Benjamin Antin*	Democrat	
23rd	John J. Dunnigan*	Democrat	
24th	Thomas J. Walsh*	Democrat	
25th	Walter W. Westall*	Republican	
26th	Seabury C. Mastick*	Republican	
27th	Caleb H. Baumes*	Republican	
28th	J. Griswold Webb*	Republican	
29th	Arthur F. Bouton*	Republican	
30th	William T. Byrne*	Democrat	
31st	John F. Williams*	Republican	
32nd	Thomas C. Brown*	Republican	
33rd	Mortimer Y. Ferris*	Rep./Dem.	
34th	Warren T. Thayer*	Republican	
35th	Jeremiah Keck*	Republican	
36th	Henry D. Williams*	Republican	
37th	Perley A. Pitcher*	Republican	
38th	George R. Fearon*	Republican	
39th	Willis Wendell*	Republican	
40th	B. Roger Wales*	Republican	
41st	James S. Truman*	Republican	
42nd	Charles J. Hewitt*	Republican	
43rd	Ernest E. Cole*	Rep./Soc.	on July 1, 1926, appointed Counsel to the State Education Dept.
44th	John Knight*	Rep./Dem./Soc.	Temporary President
45th	James L. Whitley*	Republican	
46th	Homer E. A. Dick*	Republican	
47th	William W. Campbell*	Rep./Dem.	
48th	William J. Hickey*	Republican	
49th	Leonard R. Lipowicz*	Republican	
50th	Leonard W. H. Gibbs*	Republican	
51st	Leigh G. Kirkland*	Rep./Soc.	

=== Employees ===
- Clerk: Ernest A. Fay
- Sergeant-at-Arms: Charles R. Hotaling

== State Assembly ==
=== Assemblymen ===
Note: For brevity, the chairmanships omit the words "...the Committee on (the)..."

District		Assemblymen	Party	Notes
Albany	1st	William J. Snyder	Democrat	
Albany	2nd	John P. Hayes*	Democrat	
Albany	3rd	Frederick B. Linen*	Republican	
Allegany		Cassius Congdon*	Republican	
Bronx	1st	Nicholas J. Eberhard*	Democrat	
Bronx	2nd	William F. Smith	Democrat	
Bronx	3rd	Julius S. Berg*	Democrat	
Bronx	4th	Herman M. Albert	Democrat	
Bronx	5th	Harry A. Samberg*	Democrat	
Bronx	6th	Thomas J. McDonald*	Democrat	
Bronx	7th	John F. Reidy*	Democrat	
Bronx	8th	Joseph E. Kinsley*	Democrat	
Broome	1st	Edmund B. Jenks*	Republican	Chairman of Codes
Broome	2nd	Forman E. Whitcomb*	Republican	
Cattaraugus		James W. Watson*	Republican	
Cayuga		Sanford G. Lyon*	Republican	
Chautauqua	1st	Adolf F. Johnson*	Republican	
Chautauqua	2nd	Joseph A. McGinnies*	Republican	re-elected Speaker
Chemung		Hovey E. Copley*	Republican	
Chenango		Bert Lord*	Republican	
Clinton		Ezra Trepanier	Republican	
Columbia		Henry M. James	Republican	
Cortland		Irving F. Rice*	Republican	
Delaware		Ralph H. Loomis*	Republican	
Dutchess	1st	Howard N. Allen*	Republican	
Dutchess	2nd	John M. Hackett*	Republican	
Erie	1st	John S. N. Sprague*	Republican	
Erie	2nd	Henry W. Hutt*	Republican	
Erie	3rd	Frank X. Bernhardt*	Republican	
Erie	4th	John J. Meegan*	Democrat	
Erie	5th	Ansley B. Borkowski*	Republican	
Erie	6th	Charles A. Freiberg*	Republican	
Erie	7th	Edmund F. Cooke*	Republican	
Erie	8th	Nelson W. Cheney*	Republican	
Essex		Fred L. Porter*	Republican	Chairman of State Re-Organization
Franklin		John E. Redwood	Republican	
Fulton and Hamilton		Eberly Hutchinson*	Republican	Chairman of Ways and Means
Genesee		Charles P. Miller*	Republican	
Greene		Ellis W. Bentley*	Republican	
Herkimer		Theodore L. Rogers*	Republican	
Jefferson		Jasper W. Cornaire*	Republican	
Kings	1st	Charles F. Cline*	Democrat	
Kings	2nd	Murray Hearn*	Democrat	
Kings	3rd	Michael J. Gillen	Democrat	
Kings	4th	George E. Dennen	Democrat	
Kings	5th	John J. Cooney	Democrat	
Kings	6th	George Blumberg	Republican	
Kings	7th	John J. Howard*	Democrat	
Kings	8th	Michael J. Reilly*	Democrat	
Kings	9th	Richard J. Tonry*	Democrat	
Kings	10th	William C. McCreery	Democrat	
Kings	11th	Edward J. Coughlin*	Democrat	
Kings	12th	Marcellus H. Evans*	Democrat	
Kings	13th	William Breitenbach*	Democrat	
Kings	14th	Harry Landau	Democrat	
Kings	15th	Edward P. Doyle	Democrat	
Kings	16th	Maurice Z. Bungard*	Democrat	
Kings	17th	Edward E. Fay*	Republican	
Kings	18th	Irwin Steingut*	Democrat	
Kings	19th	Jerome G. Ambro*	Democrat	
Kings	20th	Frank A. Miller*	Democrat	
Kings	21st	Emory F. Dyckman	Republican	
Kings	22nd	Jacob H. Livingston	Democrat	
Kings	23rd	Joseph F. Ricca*	Republican	
Lewis		Clarence L. Fisher*	Republican	
Livingston		Lewis G. Stapley*	Republican	
Madison		John W. Gates*	Republican	
Monroe	1st	Arthur T. Pammenter*	Republican	
Monroe	2nd	Simon L. Adler*	Republican	Majority Leader
Monroe	3rd	Cosmo A. Cilano*	Republican	
Monroe	4th	Fred J. Slater*	Republican	
Monroe	5th	W. Ray Austin*	Republican	
Montgomery		Samuel W. McCleary*	Republican	
Nassau	1st	Edwin W. Wallace*	Republican	
Nassau	2nd	F. Trubee Davison*	Republican	in July 1926, appointed as Asst. Secretary of War for Air
New York	1st	Peter J. Hamill*	Democrat	
New York	2nd	Frank R. Galgano*	Democrat	
New York	3rd	Sylvester A. Dineen*	Democrat	
New York	4th	Samuel Mandelbaum*	Democrat	
New York	5th	Frank A. Carlin*	Democrat	
New York	6th	Morris Weinfeld*	Democrat	
New York	7th	John L. Buckley*	Democrat	
New York	8th	Henry O. Kahan*	Democrat	
New York	9th	John H. Conroy*	Democrat	
New York	10th	Phelps Phelps*	Republican	
New York	11th	Samuel I. Rosenman*	Democrat	
New York	12th	John A. Byrnes	Democrat	
New York	13th	John P. Nugent*	Democrat	
New York	14th	Frederick L. Hackenburg*	Democrat	
New York	15th	Samuel H. Hofstadter*	Republican	
New York	16th	Maurice Bloch*	Democrat	Minority Leader
New York	17th	Meyer Alterman*	Democrat	
New York	18th	Vincent H. Auleta	Democrat	
New York	19th	Abraham Grenthal	Republican	
New York	20th	Louis A. Cuvillier*	Democrat	
New York	21st	Albert Grossman	Democrat	
New York	22nd	Joseph A. Gavagan*	Democrat	
New York	23rd	A. Spencer Feld*	Democrat	
Niagara	1st	Mark T. Lambert*	Republican	
Niagara	2nd	Frank S. Hall*	Republican	
Oneida	1st	Gordon C. Ferguson*	Republican	
Oneida	2nd	Russell G. Dunmore*	Republican	
Oneida	3rd	George J. Skinner*	Republican	
Onondaga	1st	Horace M. Stone*	Republican	Chairman of Re-Apportionment
Onondaga	2nd	Willis H. Sargent*	Republican	
Onondaga	3rd	Richard B. Smith*	Republican	
Ontario		Robert A. Catchpole*	Republican	
Orange	1st	DeWitt C. Dominick*	Republican	
Orange	2nd	Alexander G. Hall	Republican	
Orleans		Frank H. Lattin*	Republican	
Oswego		Victor C. Lewis*	Republican	
Otsego		Frank M. Smith*	Republican	
Putnam		D. Mallory Stephens	Republican	
Queens	1st	Henry M. Dietz*	Democrat	
Queens	2nd	John T. Hammond	Democrat	
Queens	3rd	Alfred J. Kennedy*	Democrat	
Queens	4th	Jere F. Ryan	Democrat	
Queens	5th	William F. Brunner*	Democrat	
Queens	6th	Paul P. Gallagher	Democrat	
Rensselaer	1st	Harry M. Brooks	Republican	
Rensselaer	2nd	William D. Thomas*	Republican	on November 2, 1926, elected Treasurer of Rensselaer Co.
Richmond	1st	William S. Hart*	Democrat	
Richmond	2nd	William L. Vaughan*	Democrat	
Rockland		Walter S. Gedney*	Republican	
St. Lawrence	1st	Rhoda Fox Graves*	Republican	Chairwoman of Public Institutions
St. Lawrence	2nd	Walter L. Pratt*	Republican	
Saratoga		Burton D. Esmond*	Republican	
Schenectady	1st	Charles W. Merriam*	Republican	
Schenectady	2nd	William M. Nicoll*	Republican	
Schoharie		Kenneth H. Fake*	Republican	
Schuyler		Jacob W. Winters	Republican	
Seneca		William H. Van Cleef*	Republican	
Steuben	1st	Wilson Messer*	Republican	
Steuben	2nd	Leon F. Wheatley*	Republican	
Suffolk	1st	John G. Downs*	Republican	
Suffolk	2nd	John Boyle Jr.*	Republican	
Sullivan		J. Maxwell Knapp*	Republican	
Tioga		Daniel P. Witter*	Republican	
Tompkins		James R. Robinson*	Republican	
Ulster		Millard Davis*	Republican	
Warren		Richard J. Bolton*	Republican	
Washington		Herbert A. Bartholomew*	Republican	
Wayne		Harry A. Tellier*	Republican	
Westchester	1st	Thomas Channing Moore*	Republican	
Westchester	2nd	Herbert B. Shonk*	Republican	
Westchester	3rd	Milan E. Goodrich*	Republican	
Westchester	4th	Alexander H. Garnjost*	Republican	
Westchester	5th	Arthur I. Miller	Democrat	
Wyoming		Webb A. Joiner*	Republican	
Yates		Edwin C. Nutt	Republican	

=== Employees ===
- Clerk: Fred W. Hammond

== Sources ==
- Members of the New York Senate (1920s) at Political Graveyard
- Members of the New York Assembly (1920s) at Political Graveyard
- 1926 COMMITTEE MEMBERS NAMED in The Cornell Daily Sun on January 12, 1926
