= 151st New York State Legislature =

New York state legislative session

←	150th	152nd	→
- New York State Capitol (2009)

Overview
- Legislative body: New York State Legislature
- Jurisdiction: New York, United States
- Term: January 1 – December 31, 1928

Senate
- Members: 51
- President: Lt. Gov. Edwin Corning (D)
- Temporary President: John Knight (R)
- Party control: Republican (27–24)

Assembly
- Members: 150
- Speaker: Joseph A. McGinnies (R)
- Party control: Republican (88–62)

Sessions
- 1st: January 4 – March 22, 1928

The 151st New York State Legislature, consisting of the New York State Senate and the New York State Assembly, met from January 4 to March 22, 1928, during the sixth year of Al Smith's second tenure as Governor of New York, in Albany.

== Background ==
Under the provisions of the New York Constitution of 1894, re-apportioned in 1917, 51 Senators and 150 assemblymen were elected in single-seat districts; senators for a two-year term, assemblymen for a one-year term. The senatorial districts consisted either of one or more entire counties; or a contiguous area within a single county. The counties which were divided into more than one senatorial district were New York (nine districts), Kings (eight), Bronx (three), Erie (three), Monroe (two), Queens (two) and Westchester (two). The Assembly districts were made up of contiguous area, all within the same county.

At this time there were two major political parties: the Republican Party and the Democratic Party. The Socialist Party also nominated tickets.

== Elections ==
The 1927 New York state election was held on November 8. The only statewide elective office up for election was a judgeship on the New York Court of Appeals which was carried by the incumbent Democrat John F. O'Brien who was nominated by the Democrats and endorsed by the Republicans.

Assemblywoman Rhoda Fox Graves (Rep.), of Gouverneur, a former school teacher who after her marriage became active in women's organisations and politics, was re-elected, and remained the only woman legislator.

== Sessions ==
The Legislature met for the regular session at the State Capitol in Albany on January 4, 1928; and adjourned on March 22.

Joseph A. McGinnies (Rep.) was re-elected Speaker.

== State Senate ==
=== Districts ===
- 1st District: Nassau and Suffolk counties
- 2nd and 3rd District: Parts of Queens County, i.e. the Borough of Queens
- 4th, 5th, 6th, 7th, 8th, 9th, 10th and 11th District: Parts of Kings County, i.e. the Borough of Brooklyn
- 12th, 13th, 14th, 15th, 16th, 17th, 18th, 19th and 20th District: Parts of New York County, i.e. the Borough of Manhattan
- 21st, 22nd and 23rd District: Parts of Bronx County, i.e. the Borough of the Bronx
- 24th District: Richmond County, i.e. the Borough of Richmond (now the Borough of Staten Island), and Rockland County
- 25th District: Part of Westchester County
- 26th District: Cortlandt, Greenburgh, Mount Pleasant, Ossining and part of Yonkers; in Westchester County
- 27th District: Orange and Sullivan counties
- 28th District: Columbia, Dutchess and Putnam counties
- 29th District: Delaware, Greene and Ulster counties
- 30th District: Albany County
- 31st District: Rensselaer County
- 32nd District: Saratoga and Schenectady counties
- 33rd District: Clinton, Essex, Warren and Washington counties
- 34th District: Franklin and St. Lawrence counties
- 35th District: Fulton, Hamilton, Herkimer and Lewis counties
- 36th District: Oneida County
- 37th District: Jefferson and Oswego counties
- 38th District: Onondaga County
- 39th District: Madison, Montgomery, Otsego and Schoharie counties
- 40th District: Broome, Chenango and Cortland counties
- 41st District: Chemung, Schuyler, Tioga and Tompkins counties
- 42nd District: Cayuga, Seneca and Wayne counties
- 43rd District: Ontario, Steuben and Yates counties
- 44th District: Allegany, Genesee, Livingston and Wyoming
- 45th and 46th District: Monroe County
- 47th District: Niagara and Orleans counties
- 48th, 49th and 50th District: Erie County
- 51st District: Cattaraugus and Chautauqua counties

=== Members ===
The asterisk (*) denotes members of the previous Legislature who continued in office as members of this Legislature.

Note: For brevity, the chairmanships omit the words "...the Committee on (the)..."

District	Senator	Party	Notes
1st	George L. Thompson*	Republican	Chairman of Conservation
2nd	Stephen F. Burkard*	Democrat	
3rd	Alfred J. Kennedy*	Democrat	
4th	Philip M. Kleinfeld*	Democrat	
5th	Daniel F. Farrell*	Democrat	
6th	Marcellus H. Evans*	Democrat	
7th	John A. Hastings*	Democrat	
8th	William L. Love*	Democrat	
9th	Charles E. Russell*	Democrat	
10th	Jeremiah F. Twomey*	Democrat	
11th	Louis J. Jacobson	Democrat	elected to fill vacancy. in place of Daniel J. Carroll
12th	Elmer F. Quinn*	Democrat	
13th	Thomas F. Burchill*	Democrat	
14th	Bernard Downing*	Democrat	Minority Leader
15th	John L. Buckley*	Democrat	
16th	Thomas I. Sheridan*	Democrat	
17th	Abraham Greenberg*	Democrat	unsuccessfully contested by Courtlandt Nicoll (R)
18th	Martin J. Kennedy*	Democrat	
19th	Duncan T. O'Brien*	Democrat	
20th	A. Spencer Feld*	Democrat	
21st	Henry G. Schackno*	Democrat	
22nd	Benjamin Antin*	Democrat	
23rd	John J. Dunnigan*	Democrat	
24th	Thomas J. Walsh*	Democrat	
25th	Walter W. Westall*	Republican	Chairman of Internal Affairs
26th	Seabury C. Mastick*	Republican	Chairman of Taxation and Retrenchment
27th	Caleb H. Baumes*	Republican	Chairman of Codes
28th	J. Griswold Webb*	Republican	Chairman of Public Health
29th	Arthur H. Wicks*	Republican	Chairman of Revision
30th	William T. Byrne*	Democrat	
31st	John F. Williams*	Republican	Chairman of Affairs of Villages
32nd	Thomas C. Brown*	Republican	Chairman of Penal Institutions
33rd	Henry E. H. Brereton*	Republican	Chairman of Commerce and Navigation
34th	Warren T. Thayer*	Republican	Chairman of Public Service
35th	Jeremiah Keck*	Republican	Chairman of Public Printing
36th	Henry D. Williams*	Republican	Chairman of Military Affairs; Chairman of Privileges and Elections
37th	Perley A. Pitcher*	Republican	Chairman of Civil Service; Chairman of Re-Organization of State Government
38th	George R. Fearon*	Republican	Chairman of Judiciary
39th	John W. Gates*	Republican	
40th	B. Roger Wales*	Republican	Chairman of Insurance
41st	James S. Truman*	Republican	Chairman of Labor and Industry
42nd	Charles J. Hewitt*	Republican	Chairman of Finance
43rd	Leon F. Wheatley*	Republican	Chairman of Printed and Engrossed Bills
44th	John Knight*	Republican	Temporary President; Chairman of Rules
45th	James L. Whitley*	Republican	Chairman of Affairs of Cities; on November 6, 1928, elected to the 71st U.S. Congress
46th	Homer E. A. Dick*	Republican	Chairman of Public Education
47th	William W. Campbell*	Republican	Chairman of Banks; Chairman of Re-Apportionment
48th	William J. Hickey*	Republican	Chairman of General Laws
49th	Leonard R. Lipowicz*	Republican	Chairman of Pensions
50th	Charles A. Freiberg*	Republican	Chairman of Canals
51st	Leigh G. Kirkland*	Rep./Soc.	Chairman of Agriculture

=== Employees ===
- Clerk: Ernest A. Fay
- Sergeant-at-Arms: Charles R. Hotaling

== State Assembly ==
=== Assemblymen ===
Note: For brevity, the chairmanships omit the words "...the Committee on (the)..."

District		Assemblymen	Party	Notes
Albany	1st	George B. Lidzy	Democrat	
Albany	2nd	John P. Hayes*	Democrat	
Albany	3rd	Rudolph I. Roulier*	Democrat	
Allegany		Cassius Congdon*	Republican	
Bronx	1st	Nicholas J. Eberhard*	Democrat	
Bronx	2nd	William F. Smith*	Democrat	
Bronx	3rd	Julius S. Berg*	Democrat	
Bronx	4th	Herman M. Albert*	Democrat	
Bronx	5th	Harry A. Samberg*	Democrat	
Bronx	6th	Christopher C. McGrath	Democrat	
Bronx	7th	John F. Reidy*	Democrat	
Bronx	8th	Joseph E. Kinsley*	Democrat	
Broome	1st	Edmund B. Jenks*	Republican	
Broome	2nd	Forman E. Whitcomb*	Republican	
Cattaraugus		James W. Watson*	Republican	
Cayuga		Chauncey D. Van Alstine	Republican	
Chautauqua	1st	Hubert E. V. Porter	Republican	
Chautauqua	2nd	Joseph A. McGinnies*	Republican	re-elected Speaker
Chemung		G. Archie Turner*	Republican	
Chenango		Bert Lord*	Republican	
Clinton		Charles D. Munsil	Republican	
Columbia		Henry M. James*	Republican	
Cortland		Irving F. Rice*	Republican	
Delaware		Ralph H. Loomis*	Republican	
Dutchess	1st	Howard N. Allen*	Republican	
Dutchess	2nd	John M. Hackett*	Republican	
Erie	1st	Charles J. Gimbrone	Republican	
Erie	2nd	Henry W. Hutt*	Republican	
Erie	3rd	Frank X. Bernhardt*	Republican	
Erie	4th	William J. Gleason	Republican	
Erie	5th	Ansley B. Borkowski*	Republican	
Erie	6th	Howard W. Dickey*	Republican	
Erie	7th	Edmund F. Cooke*	Republican	on November 6, 1928, elected to the 71st U.S. Congress
Erie	8th	Nelson W. Cheney*	Republican	
Essex		Fred L. Porter*	Republican	
Franklin		John E. Redwood*	Republican	
Fulton and Hamilton		Eberly Hutchinson*	Republican	Chairman of Ways and Means
Genesee		Charles P. Miller*	Republican	
Greene		Ellis W. Bentley*	Republican	
Herkimer		Theodore L. Rogers*	Republican	
Jefferson		Jasper W. Cornaire	Republican	
Kings	1st	Charles F. Cline*	Democrat	
Kings	2nd	Murray Hearn*	Democrat	
Kings	3rd	Michael J. Gillen*	Democrat	
Kings	4th	George E. Dennen*	Democrat	
Kings	5th	John J. Cooney*	Democrat	
Kings	6th	Jacob J. Schwartzwald*	Democrat	
Kings	7th	John J. Howard*	Democrat	
Kings	8th	Robert E. Sweeney	Democrat	
Kings	9th	Richard J. Tonry*	Democrat	
Kings	10th	William C. McCreery*	Democrat	
Kings	11th	Edward J. Coughlin*	Democrat	
Kings	12th	Edward S. Moran Jr.*	Democrat	
Kings	13th	William Breitenbach*	Democrat	
Kings	14th	Jacob P. Nathanson*	Democrat	
Kings	15th	Edward P. Doyle*	Democrat	
Kings	16th	Maurice Z. Bungard*	Democrat	
Kings	17th	Robert K. Story Jr.	Republican	
Kings	18th	Irwin Steingut*	Democrat	
Kings	19th	Jerome G. Ambro*	Democrat	
Kings	20th	Frank A. Miller*	Democrat	
Kings	21st	Joseph A. Esquirol	Democrat	
Kings	22nd	Jacob H. Livingston*	Democrat	
Kings	23rd	Albert M. Cohen	Democrat	
Lewis		Clarence L. Fisher*	Republican	
Livingston		A. Grant Stockweather*	Republican	
Madison		Arthur A. Hartshorn	Republican	
Monroe	1st	Arthur T. Pammenter*	Republican	
Monroe	2nd	Harry J. McKay*	Republican	
Monroe	3rd	Cosmo A. Cilano*	Republican	
Monroe	4th	Fred J. Slater*	Republican	
Monroe	5th	W. Ray Austin*	Republican	
Montgomery		Rufus Richtmyer*	Republican	
Nassau	1st	Edwin W. Wallace*	Republican	
Nassau	2nd	Leonard W. Hall*	Republican	on November 6, 1928, elected Sheriff of Nassau Co.
New York	1st	Peter J. Hamill*	Democrat	
New York	2nd	Frank R. Galgano*	Democrat	
New York	3rd	Sylvester A. Dineen*	Democrat	
New York	4th	Samuel Mandelbaum*	Democrat	
New York	5th	Frank A. Carlin*	Democrat	
New York	6th	Louis J. Lefkowitz	Republican	
New York	7th	Saul S. Streit*	Democrat	
New York	8th	Henry O. Kahan*	Democrat	
New York	9th	John H. Conroy*	Democrat	
New York	10th	Phelps Phelps*	Republican	
New York	11th	Maurice F. Cantor*	Democrat	
New York	12th	John A. Byrnes*	Democrat	
New York	13th	John P. Nugent*	Democrat	
New York	14th	Joseph T. Higgins	Democrat	
New York	15th	Samuel H. Hofstadter*	Republican	
New York	16th	Maurice Bloch*	Democrat	Minority Leader
New York	17th	Meyer Alterman*	Democrat	
New York	18th	Vincent H. Auleta*	Democrat	
New York	19th	Abraham Grenthal*	Republican	
New York	20th	Louis A. Cuvillier*	Democrat	
New York	21st	Albert Grossman*	Democrat	
New York	22nd	Joseph A. Gavagan*	Democrat	
New York	23rd	Alexander A. Falk*	Democrat	
Niagara	1st	William Bewley*	Republican	
Niagara	2nd	Frank S. Hall*	Republican	died on September 5, 1928
Oneida	1st	Gordon C. Ferguson	Republican	
Oneida	2nd	Russell G. Dunmore*	Republican	Majority Leader
Oneida	3rd	George J. Skinner*	Republican	
Onondaga	1st	Horace M. Stone*	Republican	
Onondaga	2nd	Willis H. Sargent*	Republican	
Onondaga	3rd	Richard B. Smith*	Republican	
Ontario		Robert A. Catchpole*	Republican	
Orange	1st	DeWitt C. Dominick*	Republican	
Orange	2nd	Alexander G. Hall*	Republican	
Orleans		Frank H. Lattin*	Republican	
Oswego		Victor C. Lewis*	Republican	
Otsego		Frank M. Smith*	Republican	
Putnam		D. Mallory Stephens*	Republican	
Queens	1st	Carl Deutschmann*	Democrat	
Queens	2nd	Frank B. Hendel*	Democrat	
Queens	3rd	Charles W. Posthauer*	Democrat	
Queens	4th	Jere F. Ryan*	Democrat	
Queens	5th	William F. Brunner*	Democrat	on November 6, 1928, elected to the 71st U.S. Congress
Queens	6th	Paul P. Gallagher*	Democrat	
Rensselaer	1st	Michael F. Breen*	Democrat	
Rensselaer	2nd	Maurice Whitney*	Republican	
Richmond	1st	Francis A. Hannigan	Democrat	
Richmond	2nd	William L. Vaughan*	Democrat	
Rockland		Walter S. Gedney*	Republican	
St. Lawrence	1st	Rhoda Fox Graves*	Republican	
St. Lawrence	2nd	Walter L. Pratt*	Republican	
Saratoga		Burton D. Esmond*	Republican	
Schenectady	1st	Charles W. Merriam*	Republican	
Schenectady	2nd	William M. Nicoll*	Republican	
Schoharie		Kenneth H. Fake*	Republican	
Schuyler		James A. Shepard	Republican	
Seneca		William H. Van Cleef*	Republican	
Steuben	1st	Wilson Messer*	Republican	
Steuben	2nd	Webster Edmunds*	Republican	
Suffolk	1st	John G. Downs*	Republican	
Suffolk	2nd	John Boyle Jr.*	Republican	
Sullivan		Guernsey T. Cross	Democrat	
Tioga		Daniel P. Witter*	Republican	
Tompkins		James R. Robinson*	Republican	
Ulster		Millard Davis*	Republican	
Warren		Paul L. Boyce	Republican	
Washington		Herbert A. Bartholomew*	Republican	
Wayne		Harry A. Tellier*	Republican	
Westchester	1st	William C. Olsen*	Republican	
Westchester	2nd	Herbert B. Shonk*	Republican	Chairman of Aviation
Westchester	3rd	Milan E. Goodrich*	Republican	
Westchester	4th	Alexander H. Garnjost*	Republican	
Westchester	5th	William F. Condon	Republican	
Wyoming		Joe R. Hanley*	Republican	
Yates		Edwin C. Nutt*	Republican	

=== Employees ===
- Clerk: Fred W. Hammond

== Sources ==
- Members of the New York Senate (1920s) at Political Graveyard
- Members of the New York Assembly (1920s) at Political Graveyard
- ASSEMBLY CREATES AIR COMMITTEE in The New York Times on January 10, 1928 (subscription required)
