= 148th New York State Legislature =

New York state legislative session

←	147th	149th	→
- New York State Capitol (2009)

Overview
- Legislative body: New York State Legislature
- Jurisdiction: New York, United States
- Term: January 1 – December 31, 1925

Senate
- Members: 51
- President: Lt. Gov. Seymour Lowman (R)
- Temporary President: John Knight (R)
- Party control: Republican (29–22)

Assembly
- Members: 150
- Speaker: Joseph A. McGinnies (R)
- Party control: Republican (96–54)

Sessions
- 1st: January 7 – March 27, 1925
- 2nd: June 22 – 26, 1925

The 148th New York State Legislature, consisting of the New York State Senate and the New York State Assembly, met from January 7 to June 26, 1925, during the third year of Al Smith's second tenure as Governor of New York, in Albany.

== Background ==
Under the provisions of the New York Constitution of 1894, re-apportioned in 1917, 51 Senators and 150 assemblymen were elected in single-seat districts; senators for a two-year term, assemblymen for a one-year term. The senatorial districts consisted either of one or more entire counties; or a contiguous area within a single county. The counties which were divided into more than one senatorial district were New York (nine districts), Kings (eight), Bronx (three), Erie (three), Monroe (two), Queens (two) and Westchester (two). The Assembly districts were made up of contiguous area, all within the same county.

At this time there were two major political parties: the Republican Party and the Democratic Party. The Socialist Party, the Workers Party and the Socialist Labor Party also nominated tickets.

== Elections ==
The 1924 New York state election, was held on November 4. Governor Al Smith (Dem.) was re-elected, but the other six incumbent Democratic state officers were defeated by their Republican challengers. State Senator Seymour Lowman (Rep.) was elected Lieutenant Governor, the last time in New York history that the governor and the lieutenant governor were elected from opposing tickets. The approximate party strength at this election, as expressed by the vote for Governor, was: Democrats 1,627,000; Republicans 1,519,000; Socialists 100,000; Workers 6,000; and Socialist Labor 5,000.

For the first time, a woman was elected to a statewide elective office: Florence E. S. Knapp was elected Secretary of State of New York. At the end of her term she was accused of maladministration, and was convicted of grand larceny in office in 1928. After the re-organisation of the state administration in 1926, the office became appointive, and has remained so ever since. Knapp remained the only woman elected to a statewide elective office in New York for fifty years, until the election of Mary Anne Krupsak as Lieutenant Governor of New York in 1974.

Only one woman was elected to the State Assembly: Rhoda Fox Graves (Rep.), of Gouverneur, a former school teacher who after her marriage became active in women's organisations and politics.

== Sessions ==
The Legislature met for the regular session at the State Capitol in Albany on January 7, 1925; and adjourned on March 27.

Joseph A. McGinnies (Rep.) was elected Speaker.

John Knight (Rep.) was elected Temporary President of the State Senate.

In his annual message, Gov. Al Smith proposed a thorough reconstruction of the state administration. During the next two years, many state departments were abolished, merged or created. Most notably, of three offices which had been statewide elective since 1847, one (the Secretary of State) was made appointive, and two (the State Engineer and the State Treasurer) were abolished, the duties being taken over by other departments.

The Legislature met for a special session at the State Capitol in Albany on June 22, 1925; and adjourned on June 26. This session was called by Gov. Al Smith to reconsider the state park legislation passed during the regular session.

== State Senate ==
=== Districts ===
- 1st District: Nassau and Suffolk counties
- 2nd and 3rd District: Parts of Queens County, i.e. the Borough of Queens
- 4th, 5th, 6th, 7th, 8th, 9th, 10th and 11th District: Parts of Kings County, i.e. the Borough of Brooklyn
- 12th, 13th, 14th, 15th, 16th, 17th, 18th, 19th and 20th District: Parts of New York County, i.e. the Borough of Manhattan
- 21st, 22nd and 23rd District: Parts of Bronx County, i.e. the Borough of the Bronx
- 24th District: Richmond County, i.e. the Borough of Richmond (now the Borough of Staten Island), and Rockland County
- 25th District: Part of Westchester County
- 26th District: Cortlandt, Greenburgh, Mount Pleasant, Ossining and part of Yonkers; in Westchester County
- 27th District: Orange and Sullivan counties
- 28th District: Columbia, Dutchess and Putnam counties
- 29th District: Delaware, Greene and Ulster counties
- 30th District: Albany County
- 31st District: Rensselaer County
- 32nd District: Saratoga and Schenectady counties
- 33rd District: Clinton, Essex, Warren and Washington counties
- 34th District: Franklin and St. Lawrence counties
- 35th District: Fulton, Hamilton, Herkimer and Lewis counties
- 36th District: Oneida County
- 37th District: Jefferson and Oswego counties
- 38th District: Onondaga County
- 39th District: Madison, Montgomery, Otsego and Schoharie counties
- 40th District: Broome, Chenango and Cortland counties
- 41st District: Chemung, Schuyler, Tioga and Tompkins counties
- 42nd District: Cayuga, Seneca and Wayne counties
- 43rd District: Ontario, Steuben and Yates counties
- 44th District: Allegany, Genesee, Livingston and Wyoming
- 45th and 46th District: Monroe County
- 47th District: Niagara and Orleans counties
- 48th, 49th and 50th District: Erie County
- 51st District: Cattaraugus and Chautauqua counties

=== Members ===
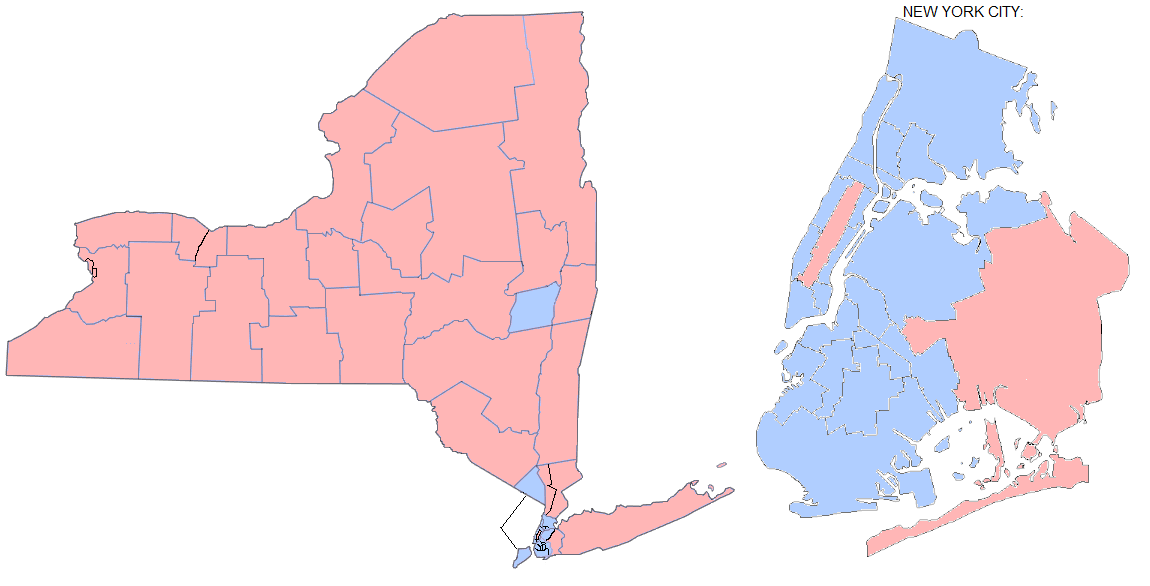
Partisan composition of the Senate.

The asterisk (*) denotes members of the previous Legislature who continued in office as members of this Legislature. Thomas F. Burchill, William J. Hickey and Leigh G. Kirkland changed from the Assembly to the Senate.

Note: For brevity, the chairmanships omit the words "...the Committee on (the)..."

District	Senator	Party	Notes
1st	George L. Thompson*	Republican	re-elected
2nd	John L. Karle	Republican	
3rd	Peter J. McGarry*	Democrat	re-elected
4th	Philip M. Kleinfeld*	Democrat	re-elected
5th	Daniel F. Farrell*	Democrat	re-elected
6th	James A. Higgins*	Democrat	re-elected
7th	John A. Hastings*	Democrat	re-elected
8th	William L. Love*	Democrat	re-elected
9th	Frank E. Johnson	Democrat	on November 3, 1925, elected to the Municipal Court
10th	Jeremiah F. Twomey*	Democrat	re-elected
11th	Daniel J. Carroll*	Democrat	re-elected
12th	Jimmy Walker*	Democrat	re-elected; Minority Leader; on November 3, 1925, elected Mayor of New York City
13th	Thomas F. Burchill*	Democrat	
14th	Bernard Downing*	Democrat	re-elected
15th	Nathan Straus Jr.*	Democrat	re-elected
16th	Thomas I. Sheridan*	Democrat	re-elected
17th	Courtlandt Nicoll	Republican	
18th	Martin J. Kennedy*	Democrat	re-elected
19th	Duncan T. O'Brien*	Democrat	re-elected
20th	Michael E. Reiburn*	Democrat	re-elected
21st	Henry G. Schackno*	Democrat	re-elected
22nd	Benjamin Antin*	Democrat	re-elected
23rd	John J. Dunnigan*	Democrat	re-elected
24th	Thomas J. Walsh	Democrat	
25th	Walter W. Westall*	Republican	re-elected
26th	Seabury C. Mastick*	Republican	re-elected
27th	Caleb H. Baumes*	Republican	re-elected
28th	J. Griswold Webb*	Republican	re-elected
29th	Arthur F. Bouton*	Republican	re-elected
30th	William T. Byrne*	Democrat	re-elected
31st	John F. Williams	Republican	
32nd	Thomas C. Brown	Republican	
33rd	Mortimer Y. Ferris*	Rep./Dem.	re-elected
34th	Warren T. Thayer*	Republican	re-elected
35th	Jeremiah Keck	Republican	
36th	Henry D. Williams	Republican	
37th	Perley A. Pitcher	Republican	
38th	George R. Fearon*	Republican	re-elected
39th	Willis Wendell	Republican	
40th	B. Roger Wales	Republican	
41st	James S. Truman	Republican	
42nd	Charles J. Hewitt*	Republican	re-elected
43rd	Ernest E. Cole*	Rep./Soc.	re-elected
44th	John Knight*	Rep./Dem./Soc.	re-elected; elected Temporary President
45th	James L. Whitley*	Republican	re-elected
46th	Homer E. A. Dick*	Republican	re-elected
47th	William W. Campbell*	Rep./Dem.	re-elected
48th	William J. Hickey*	Republican	
49th	Leonard R. Lipowicz	Republican	
50th	Leonard W. H. Gibbs*	Republican	re-elected
51st	Leigh G. Kirkland*	Rep./Soc.	

=== Employees ===
- Clerk: Ernest A. Fay
- Sergeant-at-Arms: Charles R. Hotaling
- Assistant Sergeant-at-Arms:
- Principal Doorkeeper:
- First Assistant Doorkeeper:
- Stenographer:

== State Assembly ==
=== Assemblymen ===
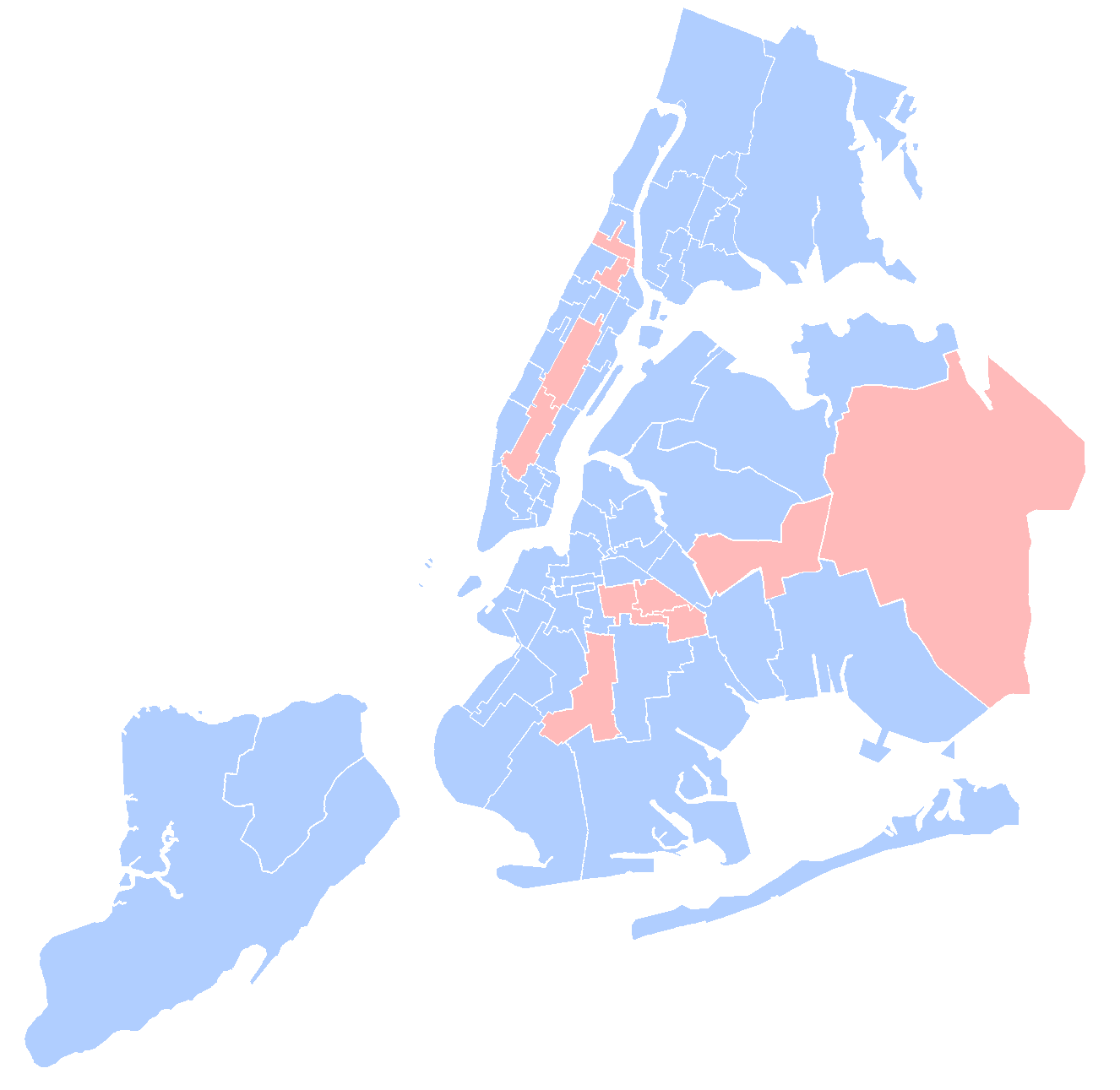
Partisan composition of the Assembly in New York City

Note: For brevity, the chairmanships omit the words "...the Committee on (the)..."

District		Assemblymen	Party	Notes
Albany	1st	Delbert C. Hall	Republican	
Albany	2nd	John P. Hayes	Democrat	
Albany	3rd	Frederick B. Linen	Republican	
Allegany		Cassius Congdon*	Republican	
Bronx	1st	Nicholas J. Eberhard*	Democrat	
Bronx	2nd	Lester W. Patterson*	Democrat	
Bronx	3rd	Julius S. Berg*	Democrat	
Bronx	4th	Louis A. Schoffel*	Democrat	on November 3, 1925, elected Register of Bronx Co.
Bronx	5th	Harry A. Samberg*	Democrat	
Bronx	6th	Thomas J. McDonald*	Democrat	
Bronx	7th	John F. Reidy*	Democrat	
Bronx	8th	Joseph E. Kinsley*	Democrat	
Broome	1st	Edmund B. Jenks*	Republican	Chairman of Codes
Broome	2nd	Forman E. Whitcomb*	Republican	
Cattaraugus		James W. Watson	Rep./Soc.	
Cayuga		Sanford G. Lyon*	Rep./Soc.	
Chautauqua	1st	Adolf F. Johnson*	Republican	
Chautauqua	2nd	Joseph A. McGinnies*	Republican	elected Speaker
Chemung		Hovey E. Copley*	Republican	
Chenango		Bert Lord*	Republican	
Clinton		George W. Gilbert*	Republican	
Columbia		Lewis F. Harder*	Republican	
Cortland		Irving F. Rice*	Republican	
Delaware		Ralph H. Loomis*	Republican	
Dutchess	1st	Howard N. Allen*	Republican	
Dutchess	2nd	John M. Hackett*	Republican	
Erie	1st	John S. N. Sprague	Republican	
Erie	2nd	Henry W. Hutt*	Republican	
Erie	3rd	Frank X. Bernhardt	Republican	
Erie	4th	John J. Meegan*	Democrat	
Erie	5th	Ansley B. Borkowski*	Republican	
Erie	6th	Charles A. Freiberg*	Republican	
Erie	7th	Edmund F. Cooke*	Republican	
Erie	8th	Nelson W. Cheney*	Republican	
Essex		Fred L. Porter*	Republican	
Franklin		George J. Moore*	Republican	
Fulton and Hamilton		Eberly Hutchinson*	Republican	Chairman of Ways and Means
Genesee		Charles P. Miller*	Republican	
Greene		Ellis W. Bentley*	Republican	
Herkimer		Theodore L. Rogers	Republican	
Jefferson		Jasper W. Cornaire	Republican	
Kings	1st	Charles F. Cline*	Democrat	
Kings	2nd	Murray Hearn*	Democrat	
Kings	3rd	Frank J. Taylor*	Democrat	
Kings	4th	Peter A. McArdle*	Democrat	
Kings	5th	Robert C. Shephard	Republican	
Kings	6th	Joseph Reich*	Democrat	
Kings	7th	John J. Howard*	Democrat	
Kings	8th	Michael J. Reilly*	Democrat	
Kings	9th	Richard J. Tonry*	Democrat	
Kings	10th	Bernard F. Gray*	Democrat	
Kings	11th	Edward J. Coughlin*	Democrat	
Kings	12th	Marcellus H. Evans*	Democrat	
Kings	13th	William Breitenbach	Democrat	
Kings	14th	Joseph R. Blake*	Democrat	
Kings	15th	Gerald F. Dunne	Democrat	
Kings	16th	Maurice Z. Bungard*	Democrat	
Kings	17th	Edward E. Fay	Republican	
Kings	18th	Irwin Steingut*	Democrat	
Kings	19th	Jerome G. Ambro	Democrat	
Kings	20th	Frank A. Miller*	Democrat	
Kings	21st	Walter F. Clayton*	Republican	Chairman of Cities
Kings	22nd	Howard C. Franklin*	Democrat	
Kings	23rd	Joseph F. Ricca*	Rep./Dem.	
Lewis		Clarence L. Fisher	Republican	
Livingston		Lewis G. Stapley*	Republican	
Madison		John W. Gates	Republican	
Monroe	1st	Arthur T. Pammenter	Republican	
Monroe	2nd	Simon L. Adler*	Republican	Majority Leader
Monroe	3rd	Cosmo A. Cilano	Republican	
Monroe	4th	Fred J. Slater	Republican	
Monroe	5th	W. Ray Austin*	Republican	
Montgomery		Samuel W. McCleary*	Republican	
Nassau	1st	Edwin W. Wallace*	Republican	
Nassau	2nd	F. Trubee Davison*	Republican	
New York	1st	Peter J. Hamill*	Democrat	
New York	2nd	Frank R. Galgano*	Democrat	
New York	3rd	Sylvester A. Dineen	Democrat	
New York	4th	Samuel Mandelbaum*	Democrat	
New York	5th	Frank A. Carlin*	Democrat	
New York	6th	Morris Weinfeld*	Democrat	
New York	7th	John L. Buckley	Democrat	
New York	8th	Henry O. Kahan*	Democrat	
New York	9th	John H. Conroy*	Democrat	
New York	10th	Phelps Phelps*	Republican	
New York	11th	Samuel I. Rosenman*	Democrat	
New York	12th	Paul T. Kammerer Jr.	Democrat	
New York	13th	John P. Nugent*	Democrat	
New York	14th	Frederick L. Hackenburg*	Democrat	
New York	15th	Samuel H. Hofstadter	Republican	
New York	16th	Maurice Bloch*	Democrat	Minority Leader
New York	17th	Meyer Alterman*	Democrat	
New York	18th	Owen M. Kiernan*	Democrat	
New York	19th	Abraham Grenthal	Republican	
New York	20th	Louis A. Cuvillier*	Democrat	
New York	21st	Pope B. Billups	Republican	
New York	22nd	Joseph A. Gavagan*	Democrat	
New York	23rd	A. Spencer Feld	Democrat	
Niagara	1st	Mark T. Lambert*	Republican	
Niagara	2nd	Frank S. Hall*	Republican	
Oneida	1st	Gordon C. Ferguson	Republican	
Oneida	2nd	Russell G. Dunmore*	Republican	
Oneida	3rd	George J. Skinner*	Republican	
Onondaga	1st	Horace M. Stone*	Republican	
Onondaga	2nd	Willis H. Sargent	Republican	
Onondaga	3rd	Richard B. Smith*	Republican	
Ontario		Robert A. Catchpole	Republican	
Orange	1st	DeWitt C. Dominick	Republican	
Orange	2nd	Charles L. Mead*	Republican	Chairman of Public Institutions
Orleans		Frank H. Lattin*	Republican	
Oswego		Victor C. Lewis*	Republican	
Otsego		Frank M. Smith	Republican	
Putnam		John R. Yale*	Republican	died on July 17, 1925
Queens	1st	Henry M. Dietz*	Democrat	
Queens	2nd	Owen J. Dever*	Democrat	resigned his seat on March 28, 1925, to accept an appointment as Director of the Queens Public Library
Queens	3rd	Alfred J. Kennedy*	Democrat	
Queens	4th	D. Lacy Dayton*	Republican	
Queens	5th	William F. Brunner*	Democrat	
Queens	6th	Henry Baum	Republican	
Rensselaer	1st	Edward J. Donohue	Republican	
Rensselaer	2nd	William D. Thomas	Republican	
Richmond	1st	William S. Hart*	Democrat	
Richmond	2nd	William L. Vaughan*	Democrat	
Rockland		Walter S. Gedney*	Republican	
St. Lawrence	1st	Rhoda Fox Graves	Republican	
St. Lawrence	2nd	Walter L. Pratt*	Republican	
Saratoga		Burton D. Esmond*	Republican	
Schenectady	1st	Charles W. Merriam*	Republican	
Schenectady	2nd	William M. Nicoll*	Republican	
Schoharie		Kenneth H. Fake*	Republican	
Schuyler		William Wickham*	Republican	
Seneca		William H. Van Cleef*	Republican	
Steuben	1st	Wilson Messer*	Republican	
Steuben	2nd	Leon F. Wheatley*	Republican	
Suffolk	1st	John G. Downs	Republican	
Suffolk	2nd	John Boyle Jr.*	Republican	
Sullivan		J. Maxwell Knapp	Republican	
Tioga		Daniel P. Witter*	Republican	
Tompkins		James R. Robinson*	Republican	
Ulster		Millard Davis	Republican	
Warren		Richard J. Bolton	Republican	
Washington		Herbert A. Bartholomew*	Republican	
Wayne		Harry A. Tellier	Republican	
Westchester	1st	Thomas Channing Moore*	Republican	
Westchester	2nd	Herbert B. Shonk*	Republican	
Westchester	3rd	Milan E. Goodrich*	Republican	
Westchester	4th	Alexander H. Garnjost*	Republican	
Westchester	5th	George A. Krug	Republican	
Wyoming		Webb A. Joiner*	Republican	
Yates		James H. Underwood*	Republican	

=== Employees ===
- Clerk: Fred W. Hammond

== Sources ==
- Members of the New York Senate (1920s) at Political Graveyard
- Members of the New York Assembly (1920s) at Political Graveyard
