= Leigh G. Kirkland =

American politician

Leigh G. Kirkland (February 8, 1873 – December 25, 1942) was an American farmer and politician from New York.

== Life ==
He was born in Conewango, Cattaraugus County, New York, the son of George Kirkland (1829–1893) and Emily E. (Ball) Kirkland (1833–1917). He attended Chamberlain Institute in Randolph and Fredonia Normal School. Afterwards he engaged in farming and the feed business. On February 27, 1895, he married Frances A. Gardner (1871–1961), and their only daughter was Viola A. (Kirkland) Patton.

Kirkland was a member of the New York State Assembly (Cattaraugus Co.) in 1921, 1922, 1923 and 1924.

He was a member of the New York State Senate (51st D.) from 1925 to 1938, sitting in the 148th, 149th, 150th, 151st, 152nd, 153rd, 154th, 155th, 156th, 157th, 158th, 159th, 160th and 161st New York State Legislatures. During his tenure he removed to Fredonia, Chautauqua County, New York.

In January 1941, he was elected President of the New York State Agricultural Society, and as such was ex officio a Trustee of Cornell University.

He died on December 25, 1942; and was buried at the Maple Hill Cemetery in East Randolph, New York.

== Sources ==
New York State Assembly
Preceded by DeHart H. Ames	New York State Assembly; Cattaraugus County; 1921–1924	Succeeded by James W. Watson
New York State Senate
Preceded by DeHart H. Ames	New York State Senate; 51st District; 1925–1938	Succeeded by James W. Riley
