= George Krug =

George Krug may refer to:

- George E. Krug, American architect
- George A. Krug, American lawyer, politician, and real estate broker from New York
