= Mark T. Lambert =

American businessman and politician (1895–1962)

Mark Tracy Lambert (April 15, 1895 – April 17, 1962) was an American businessman and politician from New York.

== Life ==
Lambert was born on April 15, 1895, in Lockport, New York, the son of Lenore and Thomas Lambert.

Lambert attended the local public and high schools. In 1913, he began working in the hardware business with his father. He enlisted in the Machine Gun Company of the 74th New York Infantry to serve in the Mexican border. During World War I, he was sent overseas with the Machine Gun Company of the 108th Infantry, 27th Division. He was wounded in action and discharged in May 1918 after three years of service.

In 1923, Lambert was elected to the New York State Assembly as a Republican, representing the Niagara County 1st District. He served in the Assembly in 1924, 1925, and 1926.

For many years, Lambert was the owner and operator of the Lambert Hardware Store in Lockport. He later moved to Woodgate.

Lambert was a member and first commander of the local American Legion post. In 1921, he married Mignomme Marantette of Binghamton. They had a son, Marc E. He was also a master of the local Freemason lodge.

Lambert died in Dunedin, Florida, where he was vacationing with his wife, on April 17, 1962. He was buried in Arlington National Cemetery. in Washington, D.C.

New York State Assembly
Preceded by David E. Jeffery	New York State Assembly; Niagara County, 1st District; 1924–1926	Succeeded by William Bewley
