= Kenneth H. Fake =

American politician and insurance agent

Kenneth Hearn Fake (February 9, 1895 – May 24, 1963) was an American politician and insurance agent from New York.

== Life ==
Fake was born on February 9, 1895, in Chatham, New York. He moved to Cobleskill when he was a boy. He was the son of Leonidas G. Fake and Clara Hearn.

Fake graduated from Cobleskill High School in 1913 and from Albany Law School in 1917. During World War I, he served in the U.S. Army and attended the Field Artillery Central Officers Training School in Camp Taylor, Louisville, Kentucky. He graduated from the school in 1919 and was Second Lieutenant. After his discharge from the Army, he conducted a general insurance agency in Cobleskill.

In 1922, Fake was elected to the New York State Assembly as a Republican, representing Schoharie County. He served in the Assembly in 1923, 1924, 1925, 1926, 1927, 1928, 1929, 1930, 1931, and 1932.

Fake was an active member of the Grange, serving as Master and Treasurer of the Cobleskill Grange as a member of the Schoharie Pomona Grange Executive Committee. In 1944, the state's executive committee appointed him the state Grange's representative to the state legislature In this position, he helped get laws passed that favored Grange interests.

Fake was a member of the American Legion, the Freemasons, the Odd Fellows, the Knights of Pythias, the Farm Bureau, the Chamber of Commerce, the New York State Agricultural Society, the Royal Arch Masonry the Schoharie County Historical Society, and the New York Historical Society. He was Cobleskill town historian. He was an active member in the United Lutheran Church in America, serving on the local and regional synods and as a delegate to church conventions. He was married to Eva A. Kling. Their children were Margaret J. and Kenneth K.

Fake died from a heart attack at the Syracuse Community Hospital on May 24, 1963. He was in Syracuse to attend a meeting of the New York State Fair Board. He was buried in Cobleskill Rural Cemetery.

New York State Assembly
Preceded by Wallace H. Sidney	New York State Assembly; Schoharie County; 1923–1932	Succeeded by William S. Dunn
