= Joseph E. Kinsley =

American lawyer and politician (1897–1952)

Joseph Edwin Kinsley (October 8, 1897 – March 28, 1952) was an American lawyer and politician from New York.

== Early life and education ==
Kinsley was born on October 8, 1897 in the Fordham section of the Bronx, New York. His father, Michael Kinsley, was a Deputy City Tax Commissioner.

Kinsley attended Fordham Preparatory School. He graduated from Fordham College in 1918 and Fordham Law School in 1922. During World War I, he served as a seaman in the United States Naval Reserve. He was admitted to the bar and began a general law practice.

== Career ==
In 1923, Kinsley was elected to the New York State Assembly as a Democrat, representing the Bronx County 8th District. He served in the Assembly in 1924, 1925, 1926, 1927, 1928, and 1929. In 1929, he was elected a New York City alderman. He continued serving as alderman until 1937, when the board of aldermen was replaced with the New York City Council. He was elected to the first City Council in 1937 and continued to serve on it until he lost his 1943 re-election. He became a notable critic of Mayor La Guardia's administration and his practices, like hiring people who live outside of New York City to head city departments and agencies. He sponsored a law that ended the practice that passed over La Guardia's veto. In 1944, he unsuccessfully ran for the New York State Senate. In 1949, he became an assistant Corporation Counsel.

Kinsley was a member of the American Legion and the Knights of Columbus. He was also president of the Holy Name Society of Holy Spirit Roman Catholic Church in the Bronx.

== Personal life ==
In 1932, he married Mary R. Reagan of Mount Vernon. They resided in Fordham.

== Death ==
Kinsley died in Palm Beach, Florida on March 28, 1952.

New York State Assembly
Preceded by Edward J. Walsh	New York State Assembly; Bronx County, 8th District; 1924–1929	Succeeded by John A. Devany Jr.
