= Benjamin Antin =

American lawyer and politician

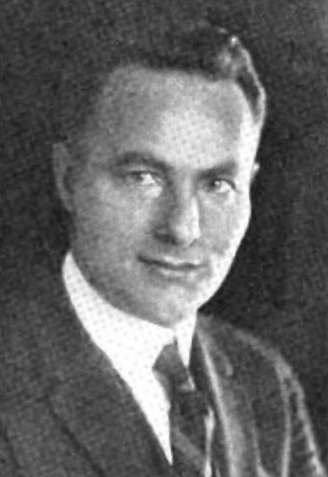
- Antin c. 1929

Member of the New York Senate from the 22nd district
- In office January 1, 1923 – December 31, 1930
- Preceded by: Edmund Seidel
- Succeeded by: Julius S. Berg

Member of the New York State Assembly from the 3rd Bronx district
- In office January 1, 1921 – December 31, 1922
- Preceded by: Samuel A. DeWitt
- Succeeded by: Julius S. Berg

Personal details
- Born: August 4, 1884 Berlinez, Podolia Governorate, Russian Empire
- Died: October 22, 1956 (aged 72) New York City, New York, U.S.
- Party: Democratic
- Spouse: Dora Polsky (m. 1918)
- Children: 2
- Education: City College of New York; New York Law School
- Occupation: Attorney, judge

Benjamin Antin (August 4, 1884 – October 22, 1956) was a Ukrainian-American lawyer and Democratic politician from New York.

== Life ==
He was born on August 4, 1884, in Berlinez, then a village in the Podolia Governorate of the Russian Empire, now located in the Bar Raion, Vinnytsia Oblast, Ukraine. He emigrated to the United States in 1900. He attended the evening schools in New York City, and graduated from the College of the City of New York in 1910, and LL.B. from New York Law School in 1913. On August 18, 1918, he married Dora Polsky (c.1897–1970).

He was a member of the New York State Assembly (Bronx Co., 3rd D.) in 1921 and 1922. In 1921, the Citizens Union endorsed Antin for re-election, saying that he was "intelligently active in behalf of housing reform bills."

He was a member of the New York State Senate (22nd D.) from 1923 to 1930, sitting in the 146th, 147th, 148th, 149th, 150th, 151st, 152nd and 153rd New York State Legislatures; and was Chairman of the Committee on Education from 1923 to 1924.

In 1927, he published his autobiography: The Gentleman from the Twenty-Second (Boni & Liveright, New York City, 301 pages).

He died on October 22, 1956, at his home at 601 East 20th Street in the Bronx, after a long illness. He was Jewish.

== Notes ==
New York State Assembly
Preceded by Samuel A. DeWitt	New York State Assembly; Bronx County, 3rd District; 1921–1922	Succeeded by Julius S. Berg
New York State Senate
Preceded by Edmund Seidel	New York State Senate; 22nd District; 1923–1930	Succeeded by Julius S. Berg
