= Frank A. Carlin =

American lawyer

Frank Anthony Carlin (February 4, 1888 – December 10, 1954) was an American lawyer, politician, and judge from New York.

== Life ==
Carlin was born on February 4, 1888, in New York City, New York.

Carlin attended Xavier High School and College. He graduated from Fordham Law School in 1914. During World War I, he served with the 606th United States Engineers. He taught in a public school for three years.

By 1923, Carlin worked as a lawyer in New York City, with an office at 132 Nassau Street. That year, he was elected to the New York State Assembly as a Democrat, representing the New York County 5th District. He served in the Assembly in 1924, 1925, 1926, 1927, 1928, 1929, and 1930. In the latter year, he was elected a Municipal Court Justice. In 1937, he became City Court Justice. While he didn't win the election for the position later that year, he was elected the following year. In 1949, he was re-elected with support from the Republican, Liberal and Fusion Parties. He was still serving as Justice when he died.

Carlin was a member of the American Legion, the Knights of Columbus, the Elks, the Ancient Order of Hibernians, the New York County Lawyers' Association, and the American Bar Association. His wife's name was Irene, and their children were Bernard F. and Mrs. Ann M. Plunkett.

Carlin died at home on December 10, 1954.

New York State Assembly
Preceded by Charles D. Donohue	New York State Assembly; New York County, 5th District; 1924–1930	Succeeded by John F. Killgrew
