= Theodore L. Rogers =

American politician (1880 – 1940)

Theodore L. Rogers (July 25, 1880 – July 28, 1940) was an American insurance businessman and politician from New York.

== Life ==
Rogers was born on July 25, 1880, in West Hebron, New York, the son of Theodore S. Rogers and Susan McEchron.

Rogers attended Cambridge High School and graduated from Albany Business College in 1898. He worked in a bank in Rutland, Vermont, for a year and a half, and in 1900 he moved to Little Falls. He initially worked as a stenographer for the Burrell Milking Machine Co., and he later became private secretary of D. H. Burrell, the company's owner. In 1908, he bought half an interest in an insurance business with William VanAlstyne. Later that year, he became an insurance partner with M. E. Ashe. In 1916, he and Ashe incorporated the company as Rogers and Ashe after they bought out Becker & Company. He was president and secretary of the State Association of Local Insurance Agents, president of the Insurance Federation of the State of New York, president of Burney, Rogers & Co., and charter member, president, and treasurer of the Little Falls Building & Loan Association.

In 1924, Rogers was elected to the New York State Assembly as a Republican, representing Herkimer County. He served in the Assembly in 1925, 1926, 1927, and 1928. In 1917, he was appointed a member of the local Police and Fire Board by then-mayor and future New York Supreme Court Justice Abram Zoller. He served on the New York Republican State Committee for four years, retiring in 1937. He was also Herkimer County Republican chairman for six years.

Rogers was a director of the local YMCA, secretary and treasurer of the General Herkimer Gun club, and a member of the Freemasons, the Shriners, the Elks, the Loyal Order of Moose, and the New York State Historical Society. He attended the Emanuel Episcopal Church. In 1908, he married Grace Burney.

Rogers died on July 28, 1940 in Little Falls Hospital. He fell off his roof while painting it the previous week and broke several ribs, fractured a vertebra, and suffered from pneumonia. He was buried in Fairview Cemetery.

New York State Assembly
Preceded by Frederic S. Cole	New York State Assembly; Herkimer County; 1925–1928	Succeeded by William J. Thistlethwaite
