= William Breitenbach =

American politician

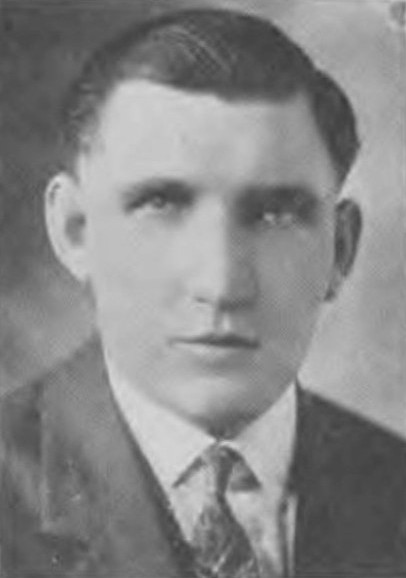
William Breitenbach in 1925

William Breitenbach (April 17, 1897 – May 13, 1937) was an American politician from New York.

== Life ==
Breitenbach was born on April 17, 1897, on 167 Ten Eyck Street in Brooklyn, New York.

Breitenbach attended Eastern District High School, but left in 1913 after his father died. He then worked in the Brooklyn Rapid Transit Company as a helper in the mechanical gang of the signal division, rising to chief signal maintainer in the company when he retired in 1917. In 1913, he began studying the industrial electrical course of the Pratt Institute. He graduated from there in March 1917. A month later, he enlisted in the 13th Coast Defense Command, New York National Guard. After it was federalized, he was sent to Fort Hamilton. In August 1917, he was sent to the enlisted specialist school in Fort Monroe, Virginia. He graduated from there in March 1918 as an electrician sergeant, first class, Coast Artillery Corps. He was then assigned to the 74th Railway Artillery Corps, American Expeditionary Forces and sent to France. He was honorably discharged from the U.S. Army in January 1919. He then returned to work for the Brooklyn Rapid Transit Company as night signal supervisor. He graduated from the New York electrical school in 1920. A month later, he left the Brooklyn Rapid Transit Company and entered the electrical contracting business under the firm Breitenbach & Eulner, later buying out Eulner.

In 1924, Breitenbach was elected to the New York State Assembly as a Democrat, representing the Kings County 13th District. He served in the Assembly in 1925, 1926, 1927, 1928, 1929, 1930, 1931, 1932, 1933, and 1934. Every year in the Assembly, he sponsored bills to legalize parimutuel betting machines in New York. In 1934, he cosponsored a bill that permitted open betting with bookmakers at tracks. He was present when Governor Lehman signed his bill and repealed the Anti-Betting Laws. He also sponsored bills to prevent payment to boxers charged with committing fouls, to curb power from the State Liquor Control Board following the repeal of Prohibition, a tax on chain stores, creation of a minimum wage board for women and children, segregation of thrift accounts held on deposit by commercial banks, and a higher tax on married women's income when their husbands have comfortable income. In 1935, he ran for the New York City Board of Aldermen, only to lose the Democratic primary.

Breitenbach was a member of the Freemasons, the American Legion, and the Forty and Eight. He was also a member of the New York State Democratic Committee. He was married to Lilla. Their children were Lila May, Lucy Jane, and Barbara Hannah.

Breitenbach died from a heart attack caused by peritonitis at Hamilton Hospital, where he had an appendectomy, on May 13, 1937. He was buried in the National Cemetery in Farmingdale.

New York State Assembly
Preceded by William A. Donnelly	New York State Assembly; Kings County, 13th District; 1925–1934	Succeeded by Ralph Schwartz
