= Ellis W. Bentley =

American farmer and politician

Ellis W. Bentley (February 17, 1884 – May 9, 1974) was an American farmer and politician from New York.

== Life ==
Bentley was born on February 17, 1884, in Brooklyn, New York, the son of John Bentley and Lizzy Annin.

In 1903, Bentley moved to Windham, in the northern Catskills. There, he conducted the largest poultry farm and hatchery in the county. He was involved in various agricultural activities and local organizations. He served on the board of education and was justice of the peace and town supervisor.

In 1922, Bentley was elected to the New York State Assembly as a Republican, representing Greene County. He served in the Assembly in 1923, 1924, 1925, 1926, 1927, 1928, 1929, 1930, 1931, 1932, 1933, and 1934.

Bentley was a member of the Windham Community United Methodist Church. His children were John, Elizabeth, Margie, and Lois.

Bentley died in Falls Church, Virginia, on May 9, 1974. He was buried in the Windham Cemetery.

New York State Assembly
Preceded by George W. Osborn	New York State Assembly; Greene County; 1923–1934	Succeeded by William Haas
