= Fred J. Slater =

American politician

Fred J. Slater (June 26, 1885 – August 20, 1943) was an American lawyer and politician from New York.

== Life ==
Slater was born on June 26, 1885, in Greece, New York, the son of John Slater and Mary (McShea) Slater. He attended District School No. 5, graduated from Charlotte High School in 1902, and received a Ph.B. from the University of Rochester in 1906. He graduated from the University of Michigan Law School in 1911 and became a member of the Order of the Coif. He was admitted to the bar in Michigan in 1911 and in New York in 1912.

Slater practiced law and engaged in farming and fruit-growing in his hometown. Later he also engaged in the farm real estate business. In 1920, he married Agnes G. Mulligan (died 1926), and they had a son.

Slater was a member of the New York State Assembly (Monroe County, 4th district) in 1925, 1926, 1927 and 1928.

He was a member of the New York State Senate (46th district) from 1929 to 1934, sitting in the 152nd, 153rd, 154th, 155th, 156th and 157th New York State Legislatures.

Slater was the town attorney of Greece from 1934 to 1939 and Assistant Clerk of the New York State Senate from 1939 until his death in 1943. In 1937, he was injoined by Judge John Knight to refrain from selling stock of the Craig Gold Mine, of Madoc, Ontario.

Slater died on August 20, 1943, in Cooperstown, New York, after a heart attack, and was buried at Our Mother of Sorrows Cemetery in Greece.

New York State Assembly
Preceded by Gilbert L. Lewis	New York State Assembly; Monroe County, 4th District; 1925–1928	Succeeded by Richard L. Saunders
New York State Senate
Preceded by Homer E. A. Dick	New York State Senate; 46th District; 1929–1934	Succeeded by Norman A. O'Brien
