= Henry D. Williams =

American lawyer and politician

Member of the New York State Senate from the 36th district
- In office January 1, 1925 – December 31, 1930
- Preceded by: Frederick M. Davenport
- Succeeded by: Samuel H. Miller

Member of the New York State Assembly from the Oneida County 1st district
- In office January 1, 1918 – December 31, 1918
- Preceded by: Albert H. Geiersbach
- Succeeded by: Hartwell W. Booth

Personal details
- Born: c. 1893 Utica, New York, U.S.
- Died: August 7, 1934 Utica, New York, U.S.
- Party: Republican
- Education: Cornell University
- Occupation: Politician, lawyer

Military service
- Allegiance: United States
- Branch/service: United States Marine Corps

Henry D. Williams (c. 1893 in Utica, Oneida County, New York – August 7, 1934 in Utica, Oneida Co., NY) was an American lawyer and politician from New York.

== Life ==
He graduated from Cornell University. He practiced law in Utica.

Williams was a member of the New York State Assembly (Oneida Co., 1st D.) in 1918. In June 1918, he joined the United States Marine Corps to fight in World War I.

He was a member of the New York State Senate (36th D.) from 1925 to 1930, sitting in the 148th, 149th, 150th, 151st, 152nd and 153rd New York State Legislatures.

Williams was found dead of heart disease in his law office in Utica, New York, in the morning of August 7, 1934.

New York State Assembly
| Preceded by Albert H. Geiersbach | New York State Assembly; Oneida County, 1st District; 1918 | Succeeded by Hartwell W. Booth |
New York State Senate
| Preceded by Frederick M. Davenport | New York State Senate; 36th District; 1925–1930 | Succeeded by Samuel H. Miller |
