= Gordon C. Ferguson =

American insurance agent and politician

Gordon C. Ferguson (December 3, 1895 – February 16, 1953) was an American insurance agent and politician from New York.

== Life ==
Ferguson was born on December 3, 1895, in Utica, New York, the son of Roscoe C. Ferguson and Bessie E. Cook.

After attending public school, Ferguson worked with his father in the restaurant business. In September 1917, during World War I, he joined the Army in Camp Dix, New Jersey, and was attached to Company D. of the 310th Infantry, 78th Division. He served 13 months overseas, participating in three major engagements and being wounded at St. Mihiel. After he was discharged in June 1919, he resumed working with his father.

In 1924, Ferguson was elected to the New York State Assembly as a Republican, representing the Oneida County 1st District. He served in the Assembly in 1925, 1926, and 1928.

Ferguson later became district manager of the Equitable Life Insurance Co., a position he held for 20 years. He then spent 12 years working as general agent for the Security Mutual Life Insurance Co. of Binghamton.

Ferguson was an active member of the American Legion, and was an organizer and commander of his local chapter. He was a member of the Elks, the Freemasons, and the Veterans of Foreign Wars. He was a member of the Tabernacle Baptist Church. In 1920, he married Florence L. Dempster. They had one daughter, Mrs. Howard Van Slyke.

Ferguson died at home on February 16, 1953. He was buried in Crown Hill Memorial Gardens.

New York State Assembly
Preceded by John C. Devereux	New York State Assembly; Oneida County, 1st District; 1925–1926	Succeeded by Martin J. Lutz
Preceded by Martin J. Lutz	New York State Assembly; Oneida County, 1st District; 1928	Succeeded by Mark C. Kelly
