= Vincent H. Auleta =

American lawyer and politician (1886–1961)

Vincent H. Auleta (April 6, 1886 – September 29, 1961) was an American lawyer and politician from New York City.

== Life ==
Auleta was born on April 6, 1886, in New York City, New York. His father Michael J. Auleta was an Italian immigrant who ran one of the best-known barbershops on the Lower East Side for nearly half a century.

Auleta attended Public School No. 83, the high school of commerce, and Manhattan College. He then taught economics and history at De La Salle Academy as well as at Public Schools Nos. 180, 23, and 77 and the night schools at Public Schools 83 and 51. He also worked as superintendent of lectures for the New York City Board of Education. He then received a bachelor of laws degree from the Fordham University School of Law and was admitted to the bar. During World War I, he was chairman of the local board No. 160 of the borough of Manhattan. He also served as assistant New York County District Attorney under Joab H. Banton for four years.

Auleta was a delegate to the 1923 Democratic judiciary committee and the 1924 Democratic state convention. In 1925, he was elected to the New York State Assembly as a Democrat, representing the New York County 18th District. He served in the Assembly in 1926, 1927, 1928, 1929, and 1930. In the 1930 United States House of Representatives election, he ran as a Democrat in New York's 20th congressional district. He lost the election to the Republican incumbent Fiorello La Guardia. He represented East Harlem in the Assembly. He later became counsel to the City Register, and Mayor La Guardia appointed him senior counsel to the New York City Housing Authority. He resigned from the position in 1958. By the time he died, he moved to Astoria, Queens.

Auleta was a member of Alpha Beta Sigma, the Pocasset Club, the Vulcano Club, and Circolo mazzini. He married Anna Schoenherr. Their children were Michael and August.

Auleta died at University Hospital on September 29, 1961. He was buried in Calvary Cemetery.

New York State Assembly
Preceded by Owen M. Kiernan	New York State Assembly; New York County, 18th District; 1926–1930	Succeeded by Sol A. Hyman
