= Sylvester A. Dineen =

American politician and school teacher (1898–1950)

Sylvester Arthur Dineen (August 11, 1898 – December 24, 1950) was an American politician and school teacher from New York City.

== Life ==
Dineen was born on August 11, 1898, in Manhattan, New York City, the son of foreman and Irish immigrant Patrick Dineen and Margaret McDonald.

Dineen attended St. Michael's parochial school, Xavier High School, Fordham College, and New York Law School. He graduated from Fordham with a Bachelor of Arts in 1920. During World War I, he was with the 69th Infantry Regiment in the New York Army National Guard and all five of his brothers also served in the war, two of them as chaplains. By 1920, he was a captain of the National Guard in the 87th Infantry Brigade, 165th New York Infantry Regiment.

Dineen later worked as an English school teacher in New York City public schools. In 1924, he was elected to the New York State Assembly as a Democrat, representing the New York County 3rd District. He served in the Assembly in 1925, 1926, 1927, 1928, 1929, 1930, 1931, 1932, and 1933.

Dineen died on December 24, 1950. He was buried in Calvary Cemetery.

New York State Assembly
Preceded by Thomas F. Burchill	New York State Assembly; New York County, 3rd District; 1925–1933	Succeeded by Eugene R. Duffy
