= Fred L. Porter =

American politician (1877–1938)

Fred LeRoy Porter (November 12, 1877 – September 5, 1938) was an American politician from New York.

== Life ==
He was born on November 12, 1877, in Crown Point, Essex County, New York. He engaged in farming, especially apple growing. He married Margaret Abbot (1880–1944), and they had two children.

Porter was a member of the New York State Assembly (Essex Co.) in 1921, 1922, 1923, 1924, 1925, 1926, 1927, 1928, 1929, 1930, 1931, 1932, 1933, 1934 and 1935. He was Chairman of the Committee on Re-Organization of the State Government from 1926 to 1931; and of the Committee on Ways and Means from 1932 to 1934. He was a delegate to the 1936 Republican National Convention.

He was found dead late on the morning of September 5, 1938, on the floor of the garage at his home in Crown Point, New York, having died of a heart attack at some time during the previous night; and was buried at the Forestdale Cemetery there.

== Sources ==
New York State Assembly
Preceded by Raymond T. Kenyon	New York State Assembly; Essex County; 1921–1935	Succeeded by Thomas A. Leahy
Preceded by Eberly Hutchinson	New York State Assembly; Chairman of the Committee on Ways and Means; 1932–1934	Succeeded by Meyer Alterman
