= B. Roger Wales =

American politician

Byron Roger Wales (July 17, 1879 – November 25, 1929) was an American lawyer and politician from New York.

== Life ==
He was born on July 17, 1879, in Binghamton, Broome County, New York. He graduated from Binghamton High School in 1898; and from Columbia Law School in 1901. He was City Judge of Binghamton from 1908 to 1911; and then Corporation Counsel of Binghamton. In 1923, he was elected Chairman of the Broome County Republican Committee.

Wales was a member of the New York State Senate (40th D.) from 1925 until his death in 1929, sitting in the 148th, 149th, 150th, 151st and 152nd New York State Legislatures. In 1927, he was appointed as a Special Deputy Attorney General to prosecute the Mayor of Amsterdam, and the D.A. and the Sheriff of Montgomery County.

He died on November 25, 1929, in Lourdes Hospital in Binghamton, New York, a week after an operation for cirrhosis; and was buried at the Floral Park Cemetery in Johnson City.

On May 29, 1930, his widow Alice C. Wales was appointed as Clerk of the Binghamton City Court.

New York State Senate
Preceded by Clayton R. Lusk	New York State Senate; 40th District; 1925–1929	Succeeded by Bert Lord
