= Harry A. Tellier =

American banker and politician

Harry A. Tellier (November 2, 1883 – May 30, 1944) was an American banker and politician from New York.

== Life ==
Tellier was born on November 2, 1883, in Avery, Iowa, the son of A. J. Tellier. He moved to New York when he was a baby, and lived all his life in Wayne County, New York.

Tellier graduated from Williamson High School. From 1912 to 1931, he worked in the First National Bank in North Rose, first as cashier then as president. He later became manager of the Palmyra Branch of the O.A. Skutt Co., Inc. He was also secretary-treasurer of the Wayne National Farm Loan Association. At some point, he moved to East Palmyra.

In 1924, Tellier was elected to the New York State Assembly as a Republican, representing Wayne County. He served in the Assembly in 1925, 1926, 1927, 1928, 1929, 1930, and 1931.

Tellier attended the Baptist Church. He was a Freemason and active in the county Red Cross. He was married to Maude Muhl. Their children were Harry Jr., Eugene, Ellen, and Mrs. Donald Lawrence.

Tellier died in Clifton Springs Sanitarium on May 30, 1944. He was buried in Lake View Cemetery in Pultneyville.

New York State Assembly
Preceded by George S. Johnson	New York State Assembly; Wayne County; 1925–1931	Succeeded by Harry L. Averill
