= Jere F. Ryan =

American politician

Jere F. Ryan (December 4, 1882 – April 2, 1948) was an American builder, automobile businessman, and politician from New York.

== Life ==
Ryan was born on December 4, 1882, in New York City, New York, the son of Jere Ryan Sr. and Catherine Kane. His father was an American Civil War veteran who worked as a contractor and builder.

Born in the Yorkville, Manhattan Ryan studied engineering at Cooper Union. He worked with the engineering staff of the Rapid Transit Construction Company and the Department of Street Openings. He was a building contractor in Queens from 1912 to 1917, heading the Jere F. Ryan Construction Company. He erected a number of buildings in Bayside, Queens, especially apartment houses. During World War I, he was a War Department investigator for the gas defense of Bronx County. In 1917, he became assistant superintendent of the Ford Motors Plant in Carney, New Jersey. In 1920, he secured agency of Ford cars in Bayside and headed sales and services offices. He was also a stockholder of the First Mortgage Guarantee Company. In 1921, he founded the Ryan Sales and Service Company and served as its president.

Ryan was active in politics for many years, serving as a Tammany district leader in New York County in around 1911. In 1925, he was elected to the New York State Assembly as a Democrat, representing the Queens County 4th District. He served in the Assembly in 1926, 1927, and 1928. He lost the 1928 re-election to Republican Robert J. Hunt. The 4th District was considered a strong Republican district. He organized the Huron Democratic Club of Bayside in 1925, serving as its president for five years and as chairman of its board of directors. He was also a member of the Queens County Democratic Executive Committee. In February 1933, Mayor John P. O'Brien appointed him Commissioner of Public Markets to fill a vacancy. While serving as Commissioner, the Departments of Markets and Weights and Measures were merged, put in force regulations to increase revenue from public markets, guarded against profiteering by food dealers, started a weighing school to train inspectors of the Bureau of Weights and Measures, and raised rates and increased restrictions at the Wallabout Market in Brooklyn. He served as Commissioner until 1933. In the last few years of his life became less active politically and focused on private business, including his position as vice-president of the Lane Lifeboat and Davit Company in Flushing. He was also an alternate delegate to the 1932 Democratic National Convention.

Ryan was an active member of the Knights of Columbus and treasurer of the Bayside Merchants' Association. In 1907, he married Catherine Downing. Their children were George, Virginia, Kathleen, and Edward. He attended the Sacred Heart Catholic Church of Bayside in 1925, but by the end of his life he was trustee of the St. Kevin's Roman Catholic Church in Auburndale. He was also a member of the Elks, the Veterans of Foreign Wars, and the National Democratic Club.

Ryan died in Flushing Hospital from a heart ailment on April 2, 1948. Rev. John B. Delea conducted the funeral service in St. Kevin's Roman Catholic Church in Auburndale. Four hundred people attended the funeral, including Borough President James A. Burke, former federal Internal Revenue Commissioner Joseph D. Nunan Jr., and Commissioner of Purchase John Splain. He was buried in Calvary Cemetery.

New York State Assembly
Preceded by D. Lacy Dayton	New York State Assembly; Queens County, 4th District; 1926–1928	Succeeded by Robert J. Hunt
