= Walter S. Gedney =

American lawyer and politician

Member of the New York State Assembly
- In office 1924–1929
- Preceded by: James Farley
- Succeeded by: Fred R. Horn Jr.

Personal details
- Born: Walter Smith Gedney; October 31, 1880 Peoria, Illinois, U.S.
- Died: August 17, 1953 (aged 72) Hudson, New York, U.S.
- Resting place: Oak Hill Cemetery
- Party: Republican
- Education: Nyack High School; New York University School of Law
- Profession: Politician, lawyer

Walter Smith Gedney (October 31, 1880 – August 17, 1953) was an American lawyer and politician from New York.

== Life ==
Gedney was born on October 31, 1880, in Peoria, Illinois. He moved to Nyack, New York, with his father when he was 2.

Gedney graduated from Nyack High School in 1895 and the New York University School of Law in 1911. He practiced law in New York City for many years at 38 Park Row. He joined the Mazeppa Engine Company of Nyack in 1905, later serving as fire commissioner of Mazeppa for three years and as the company's delegate to the Hudson Valley Volunteer Firemen's Association for 15 years. He served as president of the New York State Volunteer Firemen's Association for two years, also serving as its attorney and chairman of the law committee. He moved to Hudson in 1938.

Gedney served as police justice of Nyack from 1916 to 1919. In 1923, he was elected to the New York State Assembly as a Republican, representing Rockland County. He served in the Assembly in 1924, 1925, 1926, 1927, 1928, and 1929. When he initially ran in 1923, he defeated incumbent James Farley. While in the Assembly, he was a member of the Baumes Crime Commission.

Gedney was a member of the Rockland County Republican county committee and president of the Nyack Republican club. He was a member of the Knights of Pythias, the Order of United American Mechanics, the Elks, the Shriners, the Tall Cedars, and Master of his Freemason lodge. He was a member of the Nyack Reformed Church.

Gedney died at the New York State Firemen's Home in Hudson on August 17, 1953. He was buried in Oak Hill Cemetery.

New York State Assembly
Preceded by James Farley	New York State Assembly; Rockland County; 1924–1929	Succeeded by Fred R. Horn Jr.
