= Leonard W. H. Gibbs =

American politician

Leonard Winfield Hutchinson Gibbs (February 6, 1875 in Salamanca, Cattaraugus County, New York – June 1, 1930) was an American lawyer and politician from New York.

== Life ==
He was the son of Walter H. Gibbs (1845–1914) and Anna T. (Sexsmith) Gibbs (1853–1917). The family removed in 1878 to Limestone where his father practiced law. He graduated from Alfred University in 1898, and from University at Buffalo Law School in 1900. He was admitted to the bar, and practiced in Buffalo in partnership with Frank M. Loomis. On June 30, 1902, Gibbs married Jessie Mandana Mayne (born 1877), and they had three children.

Gibbs was a member of the Buffalo Civil Service Commission from 1910 to 1914; and a member of the New York State Assembly (Erie Co., 8th D.) in 1915 and 1916.

He was a member of the New York State Senate (50th D.) from 1917 to 1926, sitting in the 140th, 141st, 142nd, 143rd, 144th, 145th, 146th, 147th, 148th and 149th New York State Legislatures.

== Sources ==
- New York Red Book (1922; pg. 77)
- EX-SENATOR GIBBS DIES in NYT on June 2, 1930 (subscription required)
- ALFRED LOST FRIEND in The Alfred Sun, of Alfred, New York, June 19, 1930
- Gibbs genealogy at Family Tree Maker

New York State Assembly
Preceded by Wallace Thayer	New York State Assembly; Erie County, 8th District; 1915–1916	Succeeded by Herbert A. Zimmerman
New York State Senate
Preceded by William P. Greiner	New York State Senate; 50th District; 1917–1926	Succeeded by Charles A. Freiberg
