= Victor C. Lewis =

American politician

Victor Case Lewis (June 3, 1880 – May 4, 1942) was an American hotel owner and politician from New York, serving as mayor of Fulton, New York, and a member of the New York State Assembly.

Lewis was born on June 3, 1880, in Fulton, New York, the son of Thomas Dorland and Cora Case Lewis. His father was a Canadian immigrant who served as assemblyman and village president. Lewis attended public school in Fulton and the Pratt Institute in Brooklyn. He then spent four years working with the State Department of Engineering in Syracuse, Oswego, and Silver Beach. In 1908, he returned to Fulton and worked as owner of a tobacco and cigar shop for 15 years.

Lewis served as mayor of Fulton from 1915 to 1918. In 1922, he became the owner and manager of the Hotel Lewis, which his grandfather Edward H. Lewis at one point owned and managed.

In 1923, Lewis was elected to the New York State Assembly as a Republican, representing Oswego County. He served in the Assembly in 1924, 1925, 1926, 1927, 1928, 1929, 1930, 1931, 1932, 1933, and 1934. In 1935, he was again elected mayor of Fulton as an independent Republican, with the endorsement of the Democratic Party. He served as mayor from 1936 to 1938. He was a clerk in the 1938 New York State Constitutional Convention. In 1939, he was elected Oswego County Clerk, an office he held from 1940 until his death.

Lewis attended the First Presbyterian Church. He was a member of the Elks, the Rotary Club, the Grange, and the Freemasons. In 1905, he married Edith Hamilton of Lawrence, Massachusetts. Their children were Janet H. and Victorine.

Lewis died at home on May 4, 1942. He was buried in Mount Adnah Cemetery.

New York State Assembly
Preceded by Ezra A. Barnes	New York State Assembly; Oswego County; 1924–1934	Succeeded by Ernest J. Lonis
