= Meyer Alterman =

American lawyer and politician (1891–1967)

Meyer Alterman (March 28, 1891 – December 30, 1967) was an American lawyer and politician from New York.

== Life ==
He was born on March 28, 1891, in New York City. He attended Public School No. 39 and DeWitt Clinton High School. He was admitted to the bar in 1914, and practiced law in New York City. During World War I he served in the U.S. Army.

Alterman was a Democratic member of the New York State Assembly (New York Co., 17th D.) in 1923, 1924, 1925, 1926, 1927, 1928, 1929, 1930, 1931, 1932, 1933, 1934, 1935, 1936 and 1937; and was Chairman of the Committee on Ways and Means in 1935. In November 1937, he ran for re-election, but was defeated by American Laborite Oscar Garcia Rivera.

He died on December 30, 1967, in Mount Sinai Hospital in Manhattan, of a heart attack; and was buried at the Mount Hebron Cemetery in Flushing, Queens. He was Jewish.

== Sources ==
New York State Assembly
Preceded by August Claessens	New York State Assembly; New York County, 17th District; 1923–1937	Succeeded by Oscar Garcia Rivera
Preceded by Fred L. Porter	New York State Assembly; Chairman of the Committee on Ways and Means; 1935	Succeeded by Abbot Low Moffat
