= Henry G. Schackno =

American politician

Henry G. Schackno (May 6, 1878 in Albany, New York – August 23, 1950 in the Bronx, New York City) was an American lawyer and politician from New York.

== Life ==
He practiced law in New York City as a member of the firm of Oudin, Kilbreth & Schackno, with offices at 34 Pine Street.

Schackno was a member of the New York State Senate (21st D.) from 1919 to 1933, sitting in the 142nd, 143rd, 144th, 145th, 146th, 147th, 148th, 149th, 150th, 151st, 152nd, 153rd, 154th, 155th and 156th New York State Legislatures; and was Chairman of the Committee on Codes in 1923, and Chairman of the Committee on the Judiciary in 1924.

During the session of 1933, Schackno introduced a bill to add two judges to the courts in the Bronx, and on November 7 he was elected to fill one of the additional seats on the bench. He resigned his Senate seat on November 21, and his seat was next held by Lazarus Joseph (1891–1966), who later also became a New York City Comptroller.

He took office as a justice of the City Court on January 1, 1934. He was a delegate to the New York State Constitutional Convention of 1938. He was re-elected to the City Court in 1943, and remained on the bench until the end of 1948 when he reached the constitutional age limit.

He died on August 23, 1950, at his home in the Bronx.

== Sources ==
- NOMINEES ANALYZED BY CITIZENS UNION in NYT on October 27, 1918
- TWO JUDGES ADDED FOR BRONX COURTS in NYT on May 1, 1933 (subscription required)
- SCHACKNO RESIGNS FROM SENATE SEAT in NYT on November 22, 1933 (subscription required)
- LEHMAN ORDERS ELECTION IN BRONX in NYT on November 23, 1933 (subscription required)
- Memorial Book of the Association of the Bar of the City of New York (1951; pg. 93f)

New York State Senate
Preceded by John J. Dunnigan	New York State Senate; 21st District; 1919–1933	Succeeded by Lazarus Joseph
