= Ernest E. Cole =

American politician

4th Commissioner of Education of the State of New York
- In office 1940–1942
- Preceded by: Frank Pierrepont Graves
- Succeeded by: George D. Stoddard

Personal details
- Born: November 18, 1871 Savona, New York
- Died: November 19, 1949 (aged 78)
- Party: Republican
- Profession: Lawyer, Educator, Politician

Ernest E. Cole (November 18, 1871 – November 19, 1949) was a New York state lawmaker who served as Commissioner of Education of the State of New York from 1940 to 1942.

== Early life and education ==
Cole was born in Savona, New York. He graduated from Haverling High School in Bath, and then attended Cornell University, from which he graduated in 1895. He was admitted to the state bar the same year. After graduating from Cornell, Cole served as the principal of high schools at Greenwood, Painted Post, and Addison. He was a member of the Freemasons, and the Odd Fellows. In 1941, he received an honorary degree in Doctor of Pedagogy from Oglethorpe University.

== Political career ==
He entered politics as a Republican. He was a member of the New York State Assembly (Steuben Co., 1st D.) in 1920, 1921 and 1922; and a member of the New York State Senate from 1923 to 1926, sitting in the 146th, 147th, 148th and 149th New York State Legislatures. Based upon his background as an educator, Cole became a leader in the legislature on matters of education, and became chairman of the senate committee on public education during his tenure in that body. In this capacity, he sponsored the "Cole Laws" of 1925, which helped fund local school districts within constitutional limitations. The bills were called "a long step in the improvement of the State's educational system."

== Education Department ==
In recognition of Cole's leadership on these issues, he was appointed counsel of the State Education Department on July 1, 1926. Two years later, he was made a deputy commissioner of the Education Department, and in 1940 he was made commissioner.

Cole retired from the department in 1942. He died on November 19, 1949. He was buried at Seamans Cemetery in Savona.

New York State Assembly
Preceded by Samuel E. Quackenbush	New York State Assembly; Steuben County, 1st District; 1920–1922	Succeeded by Edwin J. Carpenter
New York State Senate
Preceded by William A. Carson	New York State Senate; 43rd District; 1923–1926	Succeeded by Leon F. Wheatley
