= William J. Hickey =

American politician

William J. Hickey (December 1873 – December 22, 1953) was an American lawyer and politician from New York.

== Life ==
Born on a farm in Orleans County, New York, Hickey attended Buffalo's Medina Academy and read law under the supervision of the Norton law firm to gain admission to the bar in New York in 1906.

Hickey was a member of the New York State Assembly (Erie Co., 1st D.) in 1922, 1923 and 1924. He was a member of the New York State Senate (48th D.) from 1925 to 1932, sitting in the 148th, 149th, 150th, 151st, 152nd, 153rd, 154th and 155th New York State Legislatures. He was a close ally of state senator John Knight, who would go on to become a federal judge.

He was Chairman of the Erie County Republican Committee. He resigned the post in September 1935 to get nominated for the Supreme Court.

He was a justice of the New York Supreme Court (8th D.) from 1936 to 1943.

Hickey never married, and had no immediate survivors, having outlived his only brother, Indiana politician Andrew J. Hickey, by over a decade. Hickey died in a hospital in Buffalo, weeks after his 80th birthday.

New York State Assembly
Preceded by George E. D. Brady	New York State Assembly; Erie County, 1st District; 1922–1924	Succeeded by John S. N. Sprague
New York State Senate
Preceded by Parton Swift	New York State Senate; 48th District; 1925–1932	Succeeded by Lawrence G. Williams
