= Mark W. Allen =

American lumber dealer and politician

Mark W. Allen (August 23, 1877 – October 12, 1958) was an American lumber dealer and politician.

== Early life and education ==
Allen was born on August 23, 1877, in Fairfax County, Virginia, the son of Thomas Douglass Allen and Mary Elizabeth Williams.

Allen attended the Trinity Methodist Episcopal Church in West New Brighton, and founded the popular Trinity Men's Bible Class. He was a member of the Freemasons, the Royal Arch Masons, the Knights Templar, the Scottish Rite, the Shriners, the Odd Fellows, the Junior Order of United American Mechanics, and the Knights of Pythias. In 1907, he married Bessie E. Vorhees of Belford, New Jersey. Their children were Ida M., Doris V., Bessie Betty Elizabeth, George F., and Mark Jr. Bessie died in 1936. Allen then married Julia Maud Smiles of Port Richmond in 1937. Julia died in 1945. Allen then married his third wife, Lila A. Zorn of West New Brighton.

== Career ==
Allen moved to Staten Island, New York in 1898 and began working as a carpenter for the Baltimore and Ohio Railroad. In 1902, he was promoted to superintendent of carpenters. In 1906, he entered the lumber business, and he and his brother George started the Allen Brothers Lumber Company. The firm later merged with another firm and became the Allen-Wheeler Lumber Company, with Allen as its president. In 1935, the firm became the Mark W. Allen Lumber Company. The company sold building supplies, erected buildings, and developed real estate. He was also president of the Staten Island Chamber of Commerce, the Port Richmond Board of Trade, and the West New Brighton Board of Trade, and was a member of the local school board.

In 1922, Allen was elected to the New York State Senate as a Democrat, representing New York's 24th State Senate district (Richmond and Rockland Counties). He served in the Senate in 1923 and 1924. While in the Senate, he helped get three Staten Island bridges built: the Kill Van Kull Bridge, the Goethals Bridge, and the Outerbridge Crossing. He unsuccessfully ran for Staten Island Borough President in 1929 and 1933, as well as for city council in 1937.

== Personal life ==
Allen's house in West New Brighton, New York, the Mark W. Allen House, was declared a New York City Designated Landmark by the New York City Landmarks Preservation Commission in 2006.

== Death ==
Allen died in Staten Island Hospital on October 12, 1958. He was buried in the Moravian Cemetery in New Dorp.

New York State Senate
Preceded by C. Ernest Smith	New York State Senate; 24th District; 1923–1924	Succeeded by Thomas J. Walsh
