= DeWitt C. Dominick =

American teacher, businessman and politician

DeWitt Clinton Dominick (September 19, 1851 – May 30, 1934) was an American teacher, businessman and politician from New York.

== Life ==
Dominick was born on September 19, 1851, in Gallupville, New York, the son of attorney Weidman Dominick.

Dominick worked for his father from the age of 18 to 21. He then attended the Delaware City Institute and the Albany State Normal School, graduating from the latter in 1876. After spending a year teaching in the public school in his native town, in 1877 he went to Cornell University science course. He graduated from there with a B.S. in 1881. Later that year, he became principal of the schools in Schaghticocke. He worked there for two years, followed by two more years in Greenport. He worked in hardware and drugs for two years in Gallupville. He then spent two years as a traveling salesman for the New York publishing firm E. L. Kellogg & Co., canvassing teachers' institutes in New York and Illinois. He then moved to Walden, where he worked with the schools for the next several years and became Superintendent of the Walden public schools. He also became a proprietor and manager of the Walden Citizen.

In 1899, Dominick purchased the bankrupt firm Taylor & Bateman, coal and lumber dealers in Walden. Under him, the firm became the largest coal, lumber, and feed business in Wallkill Valley. He was also involved in real estate, building over 100 homes in Walden as well as promoting and developing various manufacturing plants in the village. He was a director of the Third National Bank of Walden, the Interstate Bag Company, the Wallkill Valley Building and Loan Association, and the Rider-Ericcson Engine Corporation. He was also president of the Hudson Transit corporation and the Walden Chamber of Commerce.

Dominick served on the board of education for several terms and was a village trustee. In 1924, he was elected to the New York State Assembly as a Republican, representing the Orange County 1st District. He served in the Assembly in 1925, 1926, 1927, 1928, 1929, and 1930.

Dominick attended the Methodist Episcopal Church, serving as superintendent of the Sunday school, a Steward in the congregation, and Secretary of the building committee that was in charge of the new church that was finished in 1894. He was a Freemason since 1882. In 1883, he married Mabel F. Field of Mount Vision. Their children were DeWitt C. Jr. and Elma C. His grandson was D. Clinton Dominick III.

Dominick died at home of pneumonia on May 30, 1934. He was buried in Wallkill Valley Cemetery.

New York State Assembly
Preceded by Clemence C. Smith	New York State Assembly; Orange County, 1st District; 1925–1930	Succeeded by William J. Lamont
