= Charles W. Merriam =

American politician (1877–1961)

Charles Willis Merriam (November 5, 1877 – July 17, 1961) was an American insurance businessman and politician from New York.

== Life ==
Merriam was born on November 5, 1877, in Waverly, New York, the son of merchant and insurance businessman Charles E. Merriam and Jane Wells.

Merriam attended public school in Waverly, high school in Albany, and a course at the Albany Business College. In 1898, he moved to Schenectady and worked with his father in the insurance business. He also worked in real estate. He served in the Troop B of the New York National Guard for three years. During World War I, he was treasurer and chairman of the local Red Cross. In 1907, he was elected to the county board of supervisors. He was re-elected to the office for ten years and he was chairman of the board from 1914 to 1917. He represented the 11th ward on the board of supervisors, and as its chairman he was instrumental in founding Glenridge Hospital.

In 1923, Merriam was elected to the New York State Assembly as a Republican, representing the Schenectady County 1st District. He served in the Assembly in 1924, 1925, 1926, 1927, 1928, 1929, 1930, and 1931. In 1937, he was elected to the Schenectady City Council for a four-year term. He was re-elected to the office in 1941. He served on the City Council for 12 years. Later in life, he associated with his son Charles Jr. in the insurance business.

Merriam was a director of the Schenectady Savings Bank, the Schenectady County Tuberculosis Committee, the Humane Society, and the City Mission. He was also treasurer of the Public Health Nursing Association, the Schenectady Farm Bureau, and the City Mission. He was a member of the Chamber of Commerce and the Rotary Club. He was an elder and trustee of the Union Presbyterian Church. In 1924, he married Jessie Partch McGlashan of Los Angeles, California. Their children were Charles Willis Jr. and Stuart Hamilton.

Merriam died in Ellis Hospital on July 17, 1961. He was buried in Slate Hill Cemetery in Goshen.

New York State Assembly
Preceded by Charles T. Male	New York State Assembly; Schenectady County, 1st District; 1924–1931	Succeeded by Oswald D. Heck
