= Thomas C. Brown =

American politician

Thomas Carson Brown (April 21, 1870 – May 24, 1952) was an American businessman and politician from New York.

== Life ==
He was born on April 21, 1870, on a farm near Deseronto, Hastings County, Ontario, Canada. He attended the public schools, and a business school in Belleville, Ontario. Then he became a lumberman, and later a bricklayer. In 1896, he opened with James C. Lowe a brick construction business in St. Johnsville, New York. On August 1, 1899, Brown married Hattie B. Humphrey, and they had twin daughters.

In 1902, the partners moved their business to Schenectady. The partnership was dissolved in 1928, and Brown continued in business on his own.

Brown was a member of the New York State Senate (32nd D.) from 1925 to 1930, sitting in the 148th, 149th, 150th, 151st, 152nd and 153rd New York State Legislatures.

He died on May 24, 1952, at his home on Lowell Road in Schenectady, New York; and was buried at the Vale Cemetery there.

== Sources ==
- Thomas Brown, Contractor, Former State Senator, Dies in the Schenectady Gazette on May 26, 1952

New York State Senate
Preceded by Frederick W. Kavanaugh	New York State Senate; 32nd District; 1925–1930	Succeeded by Alexander G. Baxter
