= Hovey E. Copley =

American farmer and politician

Hovey Everitt Copley (May 2, 1869 – September 11, 1946) was an American farmer and politician from New York.

== Life ==
Copley was born on May 2, 1869, in Chemung, New York, the son of Major John Gilbert Copley and Sarah Frances Everitt. His father was a county clerk and an American Civil War veteran who served with the 86th New York Infantry Regiment and lost an arm in the Second Battle of Bull Run.

Copley attended the Elmira Free Academy. He initially worked in the coal office of General Charles J. Langdon in Elmira. When he was 17, he became the personal secretary of Mark Twain, who at the time was living at Quarry Farm. In 1904, he purchased the Lowman farm in Lowman and worked as a farmer. In 1914, he became a deputy county clerk. In 1916, he was elected county clerk, an office he held until 1923. He was also a secretary and director of the Elmira Mechanic's Savings Bank. He served on the city council for six years.

In 1923, Copley was elected to the New York State Assembly as a Republican, representing Chemung County. He served in the Assembly in 1924, 1925, and 1926.

Copley attended the First Presbyterian Church. He was a member of the Freemasons and the Elks. In 1905, he married Eleanor M. Lowman. Their children were John Gilbert and Mary Elizabeth.

Copley died at home on September 11, 1946. He was buried in Riverside Cemetery in Chemung.

New York State Assembly
Preceded by Oscar Kahler	New York State Assembly; Chemung County; 1924–1926	Succeeded by G. Archie Turner
