= William H. Van Cleef =

American politician and farmer

William H. Van Cleef (April 9, 1857 – November 20, 1934) was an American farmer and politician from New York.

== Life ==
Van Cleef was born on April 9, 1857, in an estate four miles north of Seneca Falls, New York, son of farmer William G. Van Cleef and Hannah N. Greene.

After finishing school, Van Cleef worked as an operator for a steam threshing machine for ten years. He then worked as a farmer, living on the estate he was born in. His farm had 130 acres and was largely devoted to raising Shorthorn Durham cattle. He was elected Highway Commissioner for the town of Tyre. He also served as town supervisor for Tyre. He was a justice of the peace and a member of the town board for 12 years. His son Lawrence later occupied the latter two offices.

In 1923, Van Cleef was elected to the New York State Assembly as a Republican, representing Seneca County. He served in the Assembly in 1924, 1925, 1926, 1927, 1928, and 1929.

Van Cleef attended the Presbyterian Church. He was a member of the Grange. In 1891, he married Mary E. Beach of Montezuma. Their children were Ellen Hannah and Lawrence W.

Van Cleef died at home in Seneca Falls following a five year illness on November 20, 1934. He was buried in Restvale Cemetery.

New York State Assembly
Preceded by George A. Dobson	New York State Assembly; Seneca County; 1924–1929	Succeeded by James D. Pollard
