= William L. Love =

American politician

William Lathrop Love (born July 27, 1872; date of death unknown) was an American physician and politician from New York.

== Life ==
He graduated A.B. in 1891 and A.M. in 1895 from Philadelphia City College. He studied medicine at the New York Homoeopathic Medical College and Hospital, and graduated M.D. in 1894. He became an associate editor of the North American Journal of Homeopathy.

Love was a member of the New York State Senate (8th D.) from 1923 to 1932, sitting in the 146th, 147th, 148th, 149th, 150th, 151st, 152nd, 153rd, 154th and 155th New York State Legislatures; and was Chairman of the Committee on Penal Institutions from 1923 to 1924. Throughout his tenure he remained active in the debates on crime and punishment and, for example, introduced legislation allowing children born in penal institutions to remain with their mothers for two years; advocated the segregation of hardened criminals; and endorsed the National Prison Group's proposal to replace jails with industrial farms.

In 1932, Love was the only Democratic state senator who voted for granting additional funds to the Seabury Commission to continue the investigation of corruption in New York City. Love was considered a traitor, and the Democratic boss of Brooklyn John H. McCooey denied Love a re-nomination, nominating Joseph A. Esquirol for the senatorial election instead. Love then ran as an independent with Republican endorsement, but was defeated by Esquirol in November 1932.

In 1933, he ran in the Democratic primary for Borough President of Brooklyn, but was defeated.

In 1935, Love defended his history of having solicited business from the Consolidated Gas Company during his state senate service.

Later in life, Love developed mental health problems. In 1951, he was found wandering in the rain in a Richmond, Virginia, neighborhood, with no idea of how he had gotten there from his home in Long Island, New York.

== Other ==
An H. P. Lovecraft Encyclopaedia suggests that the character Doctor Muñoz from Lovecraft's story "Cool Air" may have been modelled on Lovecraft's Brooklyn neighbor, who was described by Lovecraft as "the fairly celebrated Dr. Love, State Senator and sponsor of the famous 'Clean Books bill' at Albany...evidently immune or unconscious of the decay."

New York State Senate
Preceded by Alvah W. Burlingame Jr.	New York State Senate; 8th District; 1923–1932	Succeeded by Joseph A. Esquirol
