= Walter L. Pratt =

American politician (1868–1934)

Walter L. Pratt (1868 – April 3, 1934) was an American businessman and politician from New York.

== Life ==
He was born in 1868 in Lowell, Middlesex County, Massachusetts. He attended Phillips Academy. In 1889, he went to Adams, Jefferson County, New York, and engaged in the lumber business there. In 1904, he moved to Massena, St. Lawrence County.

Pratt entered politics as a Republican, and was President of the Village of Massena from 1920 to 1922. He was a member of the New York State Assembly (St. Lawrence Co., 2nd D.) in 1923, 1924, 1925, 1926, 1927, 1928, 1929, 1930, 1931, 1932, 1933 and 1934. He was Chairman of the Committee on Taxation and Retrenchment from 1927 to 1934.

He died on April 3, 1934, of heart disease; and was buried at the Ogdensburgh Cemetery.

== Sources ==
New York State Assembly
Preceded by Edward A. Everett	New York State Assembly; St. Lawrence County, 2nd District; 1923–1934	Succeeded by Warren O. Daniels
