= Jerome G. Ambro =

American lawyer and politician

Jerome Gerard Ambro (December 25, 1897 – March 17, 1979) was an American lawyer and politician from New York.

== Life ==
Ambro was born on December 25, 1897, in Brooklyn, New York. His parents, Antony and Providenzia Ambro, were Italian immigrants.

During World War I, Ambro served in the United States Army. He served seventeen months in France, was wounded in Verdun and received the Verdun citation for bravery. He attended the University of Toronto, graduated from St. Lawrence University, and received an LL.B. from Brooklyn Law School.

In 1924, Ambro was elected to the New York State Assembly as a Democrat, representing the Kings County 19th District. He served in the Assembly in 1925, 1926, 1927, 1928, 1929, 1930, 1931, 1932, and 1933. His district was in Bushwick. In the 1933 New York City mayoral election, he unsuccessfully ran in the primary as an anti-Tammany Democrat. He came in third and lost the nomination to incumbent John P. O'Brien, who in turn lost the election to Fiorello La Guardia. He served as an undersheriff of Brooklyn and an assistant New York Attorney General. He was the Democratic district leader for many years and chairman of the Kings County Federation of Italian‐American Democratic Clubs.

Ambro later moved to Forest Hills, Queens. He was married to Angela, and their son was congressman Jerome A. Ambro.

Ambro died while visiting his son Jerome in Huntington Station on March 17, 1979.

New York State Assembly
Preceded by Anthony L. Palma	New York State Assembly; Kings County, 19th District; 1925–1933	Succeeded by Alexander Berley
