= Herbert B. Shonk =

American politician (1881–1930)

Herbert Bronson Shonk (October 28, 1881 – September 26, 1930) was an American lawyer, businessman and politician from New York.

== Life ==
Shonk was born on October 28, 1881, in Plymouth, Luzerne County, Pennsylvania, the son of Congressman George W. Shonk (1850–1900) and Ida Elizabeth (Klotz) Shonk (1856–1911). He graduated from Wesleyan University in 1903; and from Harvard Law School in 1906. On June 20, 1917, he enlisted in the U.S. Army, and from January 13, 1918, to March 13, 1919, fought overseas in World War I. He finished the war as a major and was awarded the Croix de Guerre. Afterwards he engaged in the oil business.

Shonk was elected to the New York State Assembly (Westchester Co., 2nd D.) in 1923, 1924, 1925, 1926, 1927, 1928, 1929 and 1930; and was Chairman of the Committee on Aviation from 1928 to 1930. He died on September 26, 1930, in White Plains Hospital in White Plains, New York, after an operation for appendicitis; and was buried at the St. James the Less Cemetery in Scarsdale.

In 1907, Shonk married Gertrude Knight (1885–1938), daughter of State Comptroller Erastus C. Knight (1857–1923). They had four children, including: Herbert Bronson Shonk (1916–1943), who served as a bomber pilot in World War II and died when his airplane fell into the Pacific Ocean, and Peter Marne Shonk (1918–2013), who served as a fighter pilot in World War II and was stationed on the Navy aircraft carrier USS Enterprise in the South Pacific theater.

== Sources ==
New York State Assembly
Preceded by Walter W. Westall	New York State Assembly; Westchester County, 2nd District; 1923–1930	Succeeded by Ralph A. Gamble
