= Murray Hearn =

American politician

Murray Hearn (October 6, 1898 – March 10, 1954) was an American lawyer, politician, and judge from New York.

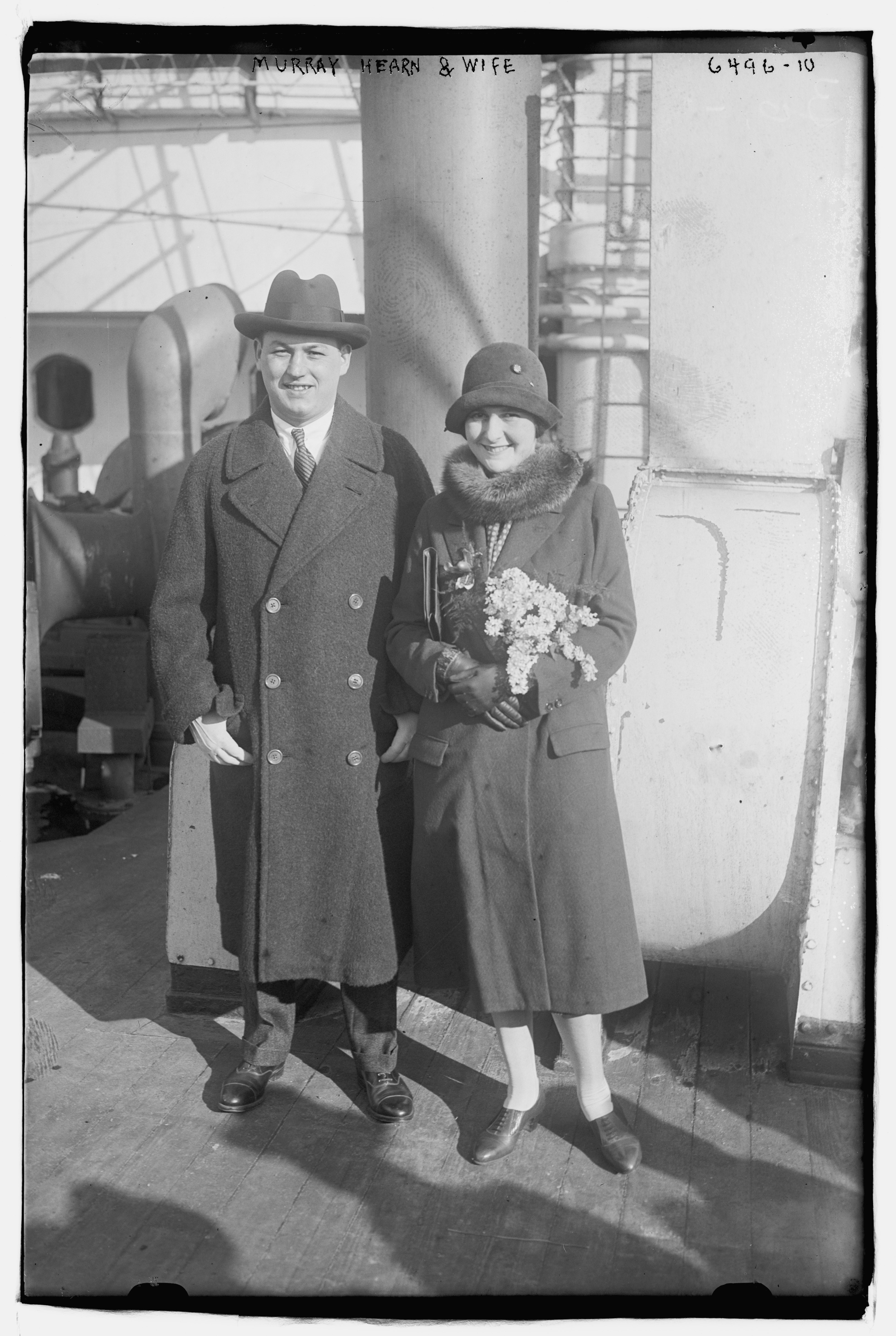

== Life ==
Hearn was born on October 6, 1898, in Brooklyn, New York.

Hearn attended St. John's Military Academy, the Syracuse University College of Law, and the New York School of Social Work of Columbia University. During World War I, he was commissioned as a lieutenant in the Army.

In 1923, Hearn was elected to the New York State Assembly as a Democrat, representing the Kings County 2nd District. He served in the Assembly in 1924, 1925, 1926, 1927, 1928, and 1929. While in the Assembly, he sponsored legislation that eliminated the Fulton Street elevated line through the downtown business part of Brooklyn and wrote the law that created the Board Higher Education.

In 1929, Hearn was elected to the Municipal Court. He served there until 1939, when Governor Herbert H. Lehman appointed him to the City Court. He was later elected there for a full term. He resigned from the Court in 1946 and unsuccessfully ran for the New York Supreme Court. In 1947, he ran again for the New York Supreme Court and won. He resigned from the bench for health reasons in January 1954, nearly two months before his death. While on the Court, he held that the Feinberg Law, which prohibited members of the Communist Party from teaching in public schools, was unconstitutional. The law was later declared constitutional by the United States Supreme Court.

Hearn was a member of the Elks, the Kismet Temple, the Shriners, the American Legion, Sigma Alpha Mu, the American Association of Social Workers, the Brooklyn Bar Association, the American Bar Association, the Freemasons, and the Knights of Pythias. He was involved in a number of organizations in various capacities, including the Brooklyn Council for Social Planning, the Federation of Jewish Philanthropies, the Brooklyn Hebrew Orphan Asylum, the Young Men's Hebrew Association of Brooklyn, and the New York City Veterans' Service Center, serving as the Brooklyn chairman of the latter organization. He was married to Norma Berk. They had two children, James and Mrs. Patricia Rees.

Hearn died in Brooklyn Hospital from a heart ailment on March 10, 1954.

New York State Assembly
Preceded by John Lucey	New York State Assembly; Kings County, 2nd District; 1924–1929	Succeeded by Albert D. Schanzer
