= Burton D. Esmond =

American lawyer and politician

Burton Deyoe Esmond (February 8, 1870 – January 11, 1944) was an American lawyer and politician from New York.

== Life ==
Esmond was born on February 8, 1870, in Tomhannock, New York, the son of Deyoe Esmond and Mary Larmon.

Esmond graduated from Troy Conference Academy at Poultney, Vermont, in 1890. He then went to Syracuse University, receiving a Ph.B. from there in 1894 and an M.Ph. in 1897. He studied law under Judge Jesse S. L'Amoreaux in Ballston Spa. After he was admitted to the bar in 1897, he began practicing law in Ballston Spa. He was appointed attorney for four New York State Comptrollers in transfer tax proceedings in Saratoga County. In 1895, he wrote and published "History of the Origin and Development of the Doctrine of State Sovereignty," a book that traced the sentiment of state and sectional animosity throughout American history.

In 1921, Esmond was elected to the New York State Assembly as a Republican, representing Saratoga County. He served in the Assembly in 1922, 1923, 1924, 1925, 1926, 1927, 1928, 1929, 1930, 1931, 1932, and 1933. His main interest was the framing and passing of the Baumes Laws, which provided stiffer sentences for criminals. He was also a leader in passing legislation for the restoration of the Saratoga battlefield and for the development of state-owned property as a health resort. He served as justice of the peace for twelve years, and from 1927 to 1928 he was a member of the New York Republican State Committee.

Esmond was a trustee of the Ballston Spa Presbyterian Church. He was a member of the Ballston Spa Chamber of Commerce, the Saratoga County Bar Association, the New York State Bar Association, and the Odd Fellows. In 1903, he married Cora D. Rosa of Saratoga Springs. Their children were Theodore Larmon and Marion Rosa.

Esmond died at home on January 11, 1944. He was buried in the Ballston Spa Village Cemetery.

New York State Assembly
Preceded by Clarence C. Smith	New York State Assembly; Saratoga County; 1922–1933	Succeeded by William E. Morris
