= John Boyle Jr. =

Irish-American lawyer and politician

John Boyle Jr. (June 7, 1876 – April 2, 1936) was an Irish-American lawyer and politician.

== Life ==
Boyle was born on June 7, 1876, the son of John Boyle, Sr. and Mary Morrison. He was born in Ulster, Ireland.

Boyle immigrated to America with his family when he was 8, and the family settled in Washington, D.C. After attending George Washington University, he moved to New York City and graduated from Columbia Law School. He then moved to the Bronx in about 1908. While there, he served as chief deputy to the State Superintendent of Elections from 1909 to 1910, attorney for the State Comptroller from 1915 to 1917, and from 1918 to 1921, and attorney for the State Tax Commission from 1921 to 1923. He also worked as counsel for the Transfer Tax Appraisers, and in 1917, Mayor Mitchell appointed him Municipal Court justice to fill a six month vacancy. During World War I, he was a captain of the New York National Guard 7th Regiment. In around 1920, he moved to Huntington, where he worked as a lawyer.

In 1923, Boyle was elected to the New York State Assembly as a Republican, representing the Suffolk County 2nd District. He served in the Assembly in 1924, 1925, 1926, 1927, and 1928.

Boyle was married to Ada Moore and had two daughters. He attended St. John's Protestant Episcopal Church. He was a member of the Freemasons and the Royal Arch Masonry.

Boyle died in the Polyclinic Hospital in New York City, where he underwent surgery, on April 2, 1936. He was buried in Pinelawn Cemetery.

New York State Assembly
Preceded by Cecil W. Proctor	New York State Assembly; Suffolk County, 2nd District; 1924–1928	Succeeded by Hamilton F. Potter
