= Leon F. Wheatley =

American politician (1872–1944)

Mayor of Hornell, New York
- In office 1934–1937

Member of the New York State Senate from the 43rd district
- In office January 1, 1927 – December 31, 1932
- Preceded by: Ernest E. Cole
- Succeeded by: Earle S. Warner

Member of the New York State Assembly from the Steuben County 2nd district
- In office January 1, 1922 – December 31, 1926
- Preceded by: Delevan C. Hunter
- Succeeded by: Webster Edmunds

Personal details
- Born: February 20, 1872 West Franklin, Pennsylvania, U.S.
- Died: December 19, 1944 (aged 72) Hornell, New York, U.S.
- Resting place: Rural Cemetery, Hornellsville, New York, U.S.
- Party: Republican
- Spouse: Mary Elizabeth Burt (m. 1898)
- Occupation: Politician

Leon F. Wheatley (February 20, 1872 – December 19, 1944) was an American politician from New York.

== Life ==
He was born on February 20, 1872, in West Franklin, Armstrong County, Pennsylvania, the son of William Wheatley. He became a dry goods merchant in Hornell, New York. On May 17, 1898, he married Mary Elizabeth Burt (born 1871).

Wheatley was a member of the New York State Assembly (Steuben Co., 2nd D.) in 1922, 1923, 1924, 1925 and 1926; a member of the New York State Senate (43rd D.) from 1927 to 1932, sitting in the 150th, 151st, 152nd, 153rd, 154th and 155th New York State Legislatures; and Mayor of Hornell from 1934 to 1937.

He died on December 19, 1944, in Hornell, New York; and was buried at the Rural Cemetery in Hornellsville.

New York State Assembly
Preceded by Delevan C. Hunter	New York State Assembly; Steuben County, 2nd District; 1922–1926	Succeeded by Webster Edmunds
New York State Senate
Preceded by Ernest E. Cole	New York State Senate; 43rd District; 1927–1932	Succeeded by Earle S. Warner
