= James S. Truman =

American politician

James Steele Truman (August 24, 1874 – July 1957) was an American lawyer and politician from New York.

== Life ==
He was born on August 24, 1874, in Owego, Tioga County, New York, the son of Gilbert T. Truman (born 1850) and Alice T. (Steele) Truman (born 1852). He graduated from Cornell University as Ph.B. in 1896, and LL.B. in 1898. Then he practiced law in Owego. In 1903, he married Nina Ruth Rich (1881–1930).

Truman was a member of the New York State Senate (41st D.) from 1925 to 1928, sitting in the 148th, 149th, 150th and 151st New York State Legislature.

After the death of his first wife, he married Mildred Faulkner (1897–1983).

He died in July 1957; and was buried at the Evergreen Cemetery in Owego.

New York State Senate
| Preceded by Seymour Lowman | New York State Senate; 41st District; 1925–1928 | Succeeded by Frank A. Frost |
