= Charles A. Freiberg =

American businessman and politician

Charles Augustus Freiberg (May 23, 1887 – May 5, 1941) was an American businessman and politician from New York.

== Life ==
Freiberg was born on May 23, 1887, in Buffalo, New York. He attended Public School No. 24, and Central High School there.

He was General Manager of the Buffalo Cement Company, and President of the Amherst Stone Company and the Duane Construction Corporation.

Freiberg was a member of the New York State Assembly (Erie Co., 1st D.) in 1923, 1924, 1925 and 1926.

He was a member of the New York State Senate (50th D.) from 1927 to 1929, sitting in the 150th, 151st and 152nd New York State Legislature; and was Chairman of the Committee on Revision in 1927, and the Committee on Canals from 1928 to 1929. He resigned his seat in September 1929, to run for Sheriff of Erie County.

He was Sheriff of Erie County from 1930 to 1932.

He died on May 5, 1941, from a heart attack, at his home in Buffalo, New York.

New York State Assembly
Preceded by George H. Rowe	New York State Assembly; Erie County, 6th District; 1923–1926	Succeeded by Howard W. Dickey
New York State Senate
Preceded by Leonard W. H. Gibbs	New York State Senate; 50th District; 1927–1929	Succeeded by Nelson W. Cheney
