= John H. Conroy =

American politician (1893–1966)

John Henry Conroy (October 23, 1893 – November 27, 1966) was an American lawyer and politician from New York.

== Life ==
Conroy was born on October 23, 1893, in Gladstone, New Jersey, son of John D. Conroy and Mary Eunice Beale.

Conroy graduated from Boston University in 1913. He graduated from Fordham University Law School in 1915. In October 1917, after America entered World War I, he joined the Army. After spending six months training in Camp Gordon, Georgia, he went overseas in April 1918. He served with the 327th Infantry, 82nd Division, and was in the defense of the Somme, the Battle of Saint-Mihiel, and the Meuse–Argonne offensive. He was discharged in May 1919 with the rank of corporal.

Following his admission to the bar, Conroy practiced law in New York City with Richard Condon at 220 Broadway. By the time he died, he was a partner in the firm Condon & Conroy. He was a corporation lawyer.

In 1922, Conroy was elected to the New York State Assembly as a Democrat, representing the New York County 9th District. He served in the Assembly in 1923, 1924, 1925, 1926, 1927, 1928, and 1929. While in the Assembly, he was active on behalf of the Transit Relief Legislation for New York City and in granting local self-governance to cities in the state. He then spent 20 years as the Democratic bill-drafting commissioner of the state legislature.

Conroy was a member of the New York County Lawyers' Association, Delta Theta Phi, the American Legion, the Veterans of Foreign Wars, the Old Guard of the City of New York, and the New York Athletic Club. He was married to Helen Martin.

Conroy died in Memorial Hospital on November 27, 1966.

New York State Assembly
Preceded by Edward R. Rayher	New York State Assembly; New York County, 9th District; 1923–1929	Succeeded by Ira H. Holley
