= Cosmo A. Cilano =

American politician (1893–1937)

Cosmo Anthony Cilano (March 22, 1893 – September 29, 1937) was an American lawyer and politician from New York.

== Life ==
He was born on March 22, 1893, in Buffalo, New York, the son of Anthony Cilano and Louise (Privitera) Cilano, both born in Valledolma, Sicily. He had seven siblings: Lena (born 1900), Jenny (born 1904, died 1918 from the Spanish flu epidemic), Frank, Josephine, Pauline, Peter, and Charles Anthony (born 2/6/1912, died 11/19/1981)). The family removed to Rochester in 1901. There he attended the public schools and graduated from East High School in 1912. He graduated from University of Buffalo Law School in 1915.

In June 1918, he joined the U.S. Navy as a hospital apprentice, and served until January 1919.

Cilano was a member of the New York State Assembly (Monroe Co., 3rd D.) in 1925, 1926, 1927 and 1928.

He was a member of the New York State Senate (45th D.) from 1929 to 1934, sitting in the 152nd, 153rd, 154th, 155th, 156th and 157th New York State Legislatures. In January 1931, he succeeded Caleb H. Baumes as chairman of the New York State Crime Commission.

He was very active in the NYS Legislature, involved in the creation of many new bills, working closely with Governor F.D. Roosevelt and his friend and law school classmate and future NYS Republican Chairman, Edwin Jaeckle. During the depression, to help job creation, he proposed what later became the NYS Thruway.

He died unmarried on September 29, 1937, at the Ray Brook Sanitarium near Lake Placid, New York, of tuberculosis.

== Notes ==
New York State Assembly
Preceded by Vincent B. Murphy	New York State Assembly; Monroe County, 3rd District; 1925–1928	Succeeded by Haskell H. Marks
New York State Senate
Preceded by James L. Whitley	New York State Senate; 45th District; 1929–1934	Succeeded by George B. Kelly
