= Herman M. Albert =

American politician

Herman M. Albert (August 15, 1901 – February 4, 1947) was a Jewish-American lawyer and politician.

== Life ==
Albert was born on August 15, 1901, in New York City, New York, the son of Adolph Albert and Rose Alter.

Albert attended the College of the City of New York and graduated from the New York University School of Law with an LL.B. in 1922. He then began a general law practice in New York City. In 1925, he was elected to the New York State Assembly as a Democrat, representing the Bronx County 4th District. He served in the Assembly in 1926, 1927, 1928, 1929, 1930, 1931, 1932, and 1933. He then served as Bronx County Register from 1934 to 1941. He was re-elected for a third four-year term in 1941, but the office of County Register was abolished that year and replaced with a city-wide Register appointed by the Mayor. His last law office before his death was at 1501 Broadway.

Albert was a director of the Bronx Division of the Federation of Jewish Philanthropic Societies and the Bronx YMHA, a founder and member of the Bronx Lodge of the Free Sons of Israel, an associate of various communal and civic societies in the Bronx, and a member of the Bronx County Bar Association and the Congress of Galician Zionists of America.

Albert died in Montefiore Hospital from a five-year illness on February 4, 1947. He was buried in Mount Zion Cemetery.

New York State Assembly
Preceded by Louis A. Schoffel	New York State Assembly; Bronx County, 4th District; 1926–1933	Succeeded by Samuel Weisman
