= William M. Nicoll =

American lawyer, politician and judge

William MacRae Nicoll (May 7, 1893 – July 29, 1970) was a Scottish-American lawyer, politician, and judge from New York.

== Life ==
Nicoll was born on May 7, 1893, in Dundee, Scotland, the son of William M. Nicoll and Margaret Constable. He immigrated to America with his family in 1902 and settled in Scotia, New York, where his father worked as a machinist for the General Electric Company.

Nicoll attended the Scotia public and high schools. After a year working in General Electric, he entered Albany Law School. He graduated from there with an LL.B. in 1916, and after clerking for a year he was admitted to the bar in 1917. He then opened a law office in Schenectady and practiced law there. He served as corporation counsel for Scotia. In 1916, he was elected police justice of Scotia, an office he held for four years. In 1919, he was elected justice of the peace of Glenville, which he held for a few years.

In 1923, Nicoll was elected to the New York State Assembly as a Republican, representing the Schenectady County 2nd District. He served in the Assembly in 1924, 1925, 1926, 1927, 1928, and 1929.

In 1938, Nicoll became first assistant district attorney for Schenectady County. In 1943, Governor Thomas E. Dewey appointed him District Attorney. He was then elected to the office in 1943, 1946, and 1949. He resigned from the office at the end of 1950 after he was elected Children's Court judge. He was still on the court when it became the Family Court in September 1962, and in 1961, he was a member of a state committee of 12 judges to frame rules and forms of the new court. In the committee, he struck out the term "juvenile delinquent" and had it replaced with a new category called "person in need of supervision." His second term as judge expired in the end of 1962. He later practiced law with his son Robert.

Nicoll was a member of the Schenectady County Bar Association and the Scotia Chamber of Commerce. He attended the Scotia Reformed Church. In 1918, he married Isabelle Osborne. Their children were William O., Robert MacRae, and John A.. He was also Master of the local Freemason lodge, president of the Scotia Rotary Club, a director of the Community Welfare Council, and affiliated with the boards of the Schenectady Boys Club, the Schenectady YMCA, and the Boy Scouts.

Nicoll died in Ellis Hospital on July 29, 1970. He was buried in Park Cemetery in Scotia.

New York State Assembly
Preceded by William W. Campbell	New York State Assembly; Schenectady County, 2nd District; 1924–1929	Succeeded by William W. Wemple, Jr.
