= Thomas I. Sheridan =

American lawyer and politician

Thomas I. Sheridan (c. 1890 in New York City – c. 1962) was an American lawyer and politician from New York.

== Life ==
He attended Xavier High School and College, graduating A.B. in 1909. He graduated LL.B. from Fordham Law School in 1911, was admitted to the bar in 1912, and practiced in New York City, at times in partnership with Ferdinand Pecora and Joab H. Banton.

He married Marie A. Galligan (died 1955), and they had eleven children.

Sheridan entered politics as a Democrat, and was appointed by D.A. Edward Swann as an Assistant New York County District Attorney. He resigned on November 30, 1920, and resumed his private practice.

He was a member of the New York State Senate (16th D.) from 1922 to 1930, sitting in the 145th, 146th, 147th, 148th, 149th, 150th, 151st, 152nd and 153rd New York State Legislatures; and was Chairman of the Committee on Taxation and Retrenchment from 1923 to 1924. In 1930, Tammany Hall denied Sheridan a re-nomination.

At the New York City mayoral election in 1933, Sheridan managed the campaign of Joseph V. McKee, and his Recovery Party, in Manhattan; and in 1934 became Chairman of the Recovery Party New York County Committee.

== Sources ==
- T. I. Sheridan, Swann Aid, Resigns in NYT on December 1, 1920
- RECOVERY PARTY ORGANIZES COUNTY; Ex-Senator Sheridan Chosen to Lead Fight on Tammany at Next Primaries in NYT on January 17, 1934 (subscription required)
- MRS. THOMAS I. SHERIDAN in NYT on May 20, 1955 (subscription required)

New York State Senate
Preceded by Martin G. McCue	New York State Senate; 16th District; 1921–1930	Succeeded by John J. McNaboe
