= Thomas J. Walsh (New York politician) =

American lawyer and politician

Thomas J. Walsh (c. 1892 – October 9, 1955) was an American lawyer and politician from New York.

== Life ==
Walsh was a member of the New York State Senate (24th D.) from 1925 to 1928, sitting in the 148th, 149th, 150th and 151st New York State Legislatures.

He was District Attorney of Richmond County from 1932 to 1936; a Municipal Justice from 1937 to 1944; and a judge of the Richmond County Court from 1944 until his death in 1955.

He died on October 9, 1955, at his home at 1031 Gordon Street in Stapleton, Staten Island.

New York State Senate
Preceded by Mark W. Allen	New York State Senate; 24th District; 1925–1928	Succeeded by Harry J. Palmer
Legal offices
Preceded by Albert C. Fach	Richmond County District Attorney; 1932–1936	Succeeded by Frank H. Innes
