= George J. Skinner =

American politician

George Joseph Skinner (February 16, 1869 – January 18, 1935) was an American lawyer and politician from New York.

== Life ==
Skinner was born on February 16, 1869, in Vienna, New York, the son of farmer Franklin Skinner and Sarah A. Quance.

Skinner lived in Annsville and Lee for brief periods before settling in Camden, where he lived for the rest of his life. In 1890, he graduated from Camden High School. After teaching for a term, he began working as a law clerk for Davies & Johnson in 1891. He was admitted to the bar in 1894, and he initially continued working with Davies & Johnson. In 1896, he opened his own law office in Camden. For the last few years of his life, he was associated with his son Roscoe. In 1896, he was elected town clerk and served in that office for four years. He was police justice of Camden from 1898 to 1906 and again from 1912 to 1924. He was elected town supervisor of Camden in 1901, 1909, and 1917, serving the position for a total of ten nonconsecutive years. He was elected to the Board of Village Trustees in 1917, and he served as mayor of the village of Camden. He served as postmaster of Camden for four years after being appointed to the office by President Theodore Roosevelt. He also conducted a coal business and fire insurance agency, and served on the board of education. During World War I, he sat on the questionnaire board and participated in the Red Cross and Liberty Loan drives.

In 1923, Skinner was elected to the New York State Assembly as a Republican, representing the Oneida County 3rd District. He served in the Assembly in 1924, 1925, 1926, 1927, 1928, and 1929.

Skinner attended the Methodist Episcopal Church in Camden. He was a member of the Freemasons, the Odd Fellows, and the Royal Arcanum. In 1895, he married Lottie M. Shorey of Osceola. Their surviving children were Ruth E., Roscoe B., and Mabel Q. Lottie later died, and in 1908 Skinner married Mary J. Orr of Florence. He was also a member of the Order of United American Mechanics.

Skinner died at home on January 18, 1935. He was buried in the family plot in Forest Park Cemetery.

New York State Assembly
Preceded by Chauncey J. Williams	New York State Assembly; Oneida County, 3rd District; 1924–1929	Succeeded by Walter W. Abbott
