= Jeremiah Keck =

American politician

Jeremiah Keck (November 9, 1845 – July 31, 1930) was an American lawyer and politician from New York.

== Life ==
He was born on November 9, 1845, in Johnstown, Fulton County, New York, the son of Isaac Keck (born 1814) and Eliza Ann (Burns) Keck (1818–1857). He attended the public schools and worked on the family farm. During the American Civil War, he enlisted in the 77th New York Volunteer Infantry on February 24, 1862; mustered in as a private on April 21; and was discharged for disability on December 26, 1862, at Baltimore, Maryland.

After his discharge, he attended Clinton Liberal Institute and Whitestown Seminary. Then he studied law, was admitted to the bar in 1869, and practiced in Johnstown. In June 1874, he married Jennie A. Kibbe (1842–1888), and they had one daughter: Flora DeFonclaire Keck (1879–1968).

He was District Attorney of Fulton County from 1875 to 1880; Judge and Surrogate of the Fulton County Court from 1884 to 1901; and Surrogate of Fulton County from 1902 to 1915. In November 1890, he married Sara Riggs (1848–1934).

Keck was a member of the New York State Senate (35th D.) from 1925 to 1928, sitting in the 148th, 149th, 150th and 151st New York State Legislatures.

He died on July 31, 1930, in Johnstown, New York; and was buried at the Johnstown Cemetery there.

Assemblyman Philip Keck (born 1848) was his brother.

== Sources ==
New York State Senate
Preceded by Theodore Douglas Robinson	New York State Senate; 35th District; 1925–1928	Succeeded by Henry I. Patrie
