= William Whitmore Campbell =

American politician (1870–1934)

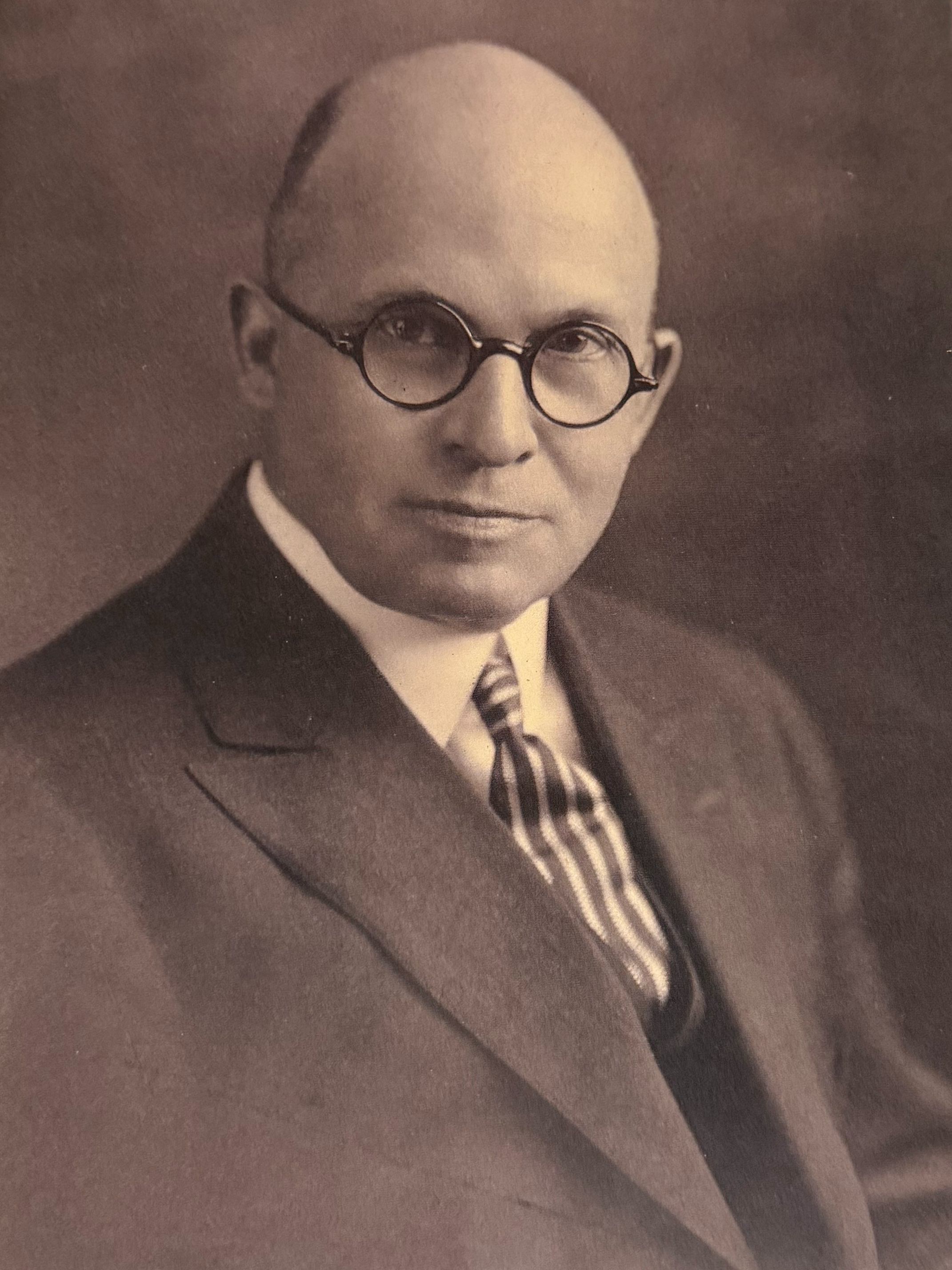
William Whitmore Campbell, c. 1920

William Whitmore Campbell (October 20, 1870 in Gasport, Niagara County, New York – November 21, 1934 in Lockport, Niagara Co., NY) was an American lawyer and politician from New York.

== Life ==
He was the son of Enoch S. Campbell.

He practiced law in Lockport. He was President of the Lockport Felt Company, Treasurer of the Harrison Radiator Corporation, and sat on the boards of many other companies.

Campbell was a member of the New York State Senate (47th D.) from 1921 to 1932, sitting in the 144th, 145th, 146th, 147th, 148th, 149th, 150th, 151st, 152nd, 153rd, 154th and 155th New York State Legislatures; and was Chairman of the Committee on Banks and the Committee on Re-Apportionment from 1931 to 1932.

He died on November 21, 1934, at his home in Lockport, New York, and was buried at the Cold Springs Cemetery there.

== Sources ==
New York State Senate
Preceded by George F. Thompson	New York State Senate; 47th District; 1921–1932	Succeeded by William H. Lee
