= George A. Krug =

American lawyer, politician, and real estate broker

George A. Krug (October 13, 1897 – September 8, 1977) was an American lawyer, politician, and real estate broker from New York.

== Life ==
Krug was born on October 13, 1897, in Yonkers, New York, the son of merchant and town supervisor Alfred M. Krug.

During World War I, Krug enlisted as a private in the American Army. He was promoted to corporal and then sergeant, ultimately commanding a platoon that fought in the major engagements the American Army fought. After the Armistice, he studied law in Toulouse University in France. After returning to America, he studied at New York University School of Law. While attending school there in the evening, he worked during the day at a carpet shop, in the Gazette Press, and as a secretary for former Commissioner of Public Works See. He graduated from New York University in 1922 and after he was admitted to the bar he worked for the Westchester Title and Trust Company as a closing attorney.

In 1924, Krug was elected to the New York State Assembly as a Republican, representing the Westchester County 5th District. He served in the Assembly in 1925. In 1952, he moved to Berlin. He later settled in Sharpes, Florida, where he worked as a real estate broker.

Krug attended the Central Methodist Church. He was a member of the YMCA and Delta Chi. In 1920, he married Alinda Pearsall of Yonkers. Their children were Mrs. Janet M. Woods, George Jr., and Alfred. He was a commander and charter member of his local American Legion post and a 60-year member of his Freemason lodge.

Krug died in an Albany hospital on September 8, 1977. He was buried in Mt. Hope Cemetery in Hastings.

New York State Assembly
Preceded by Arthur I. Miller	New York State Assembly; Westchester County, 5th District; 1925	Succeeded by Arthur I. Miller
