= Millard Davis =

American lawyer, farmer, and politician

Millard Davis (August 3, 1883 – September 15, 1957) was an American lawyer, farmer and politician from New York.

== Biography ==
=== Birth ===
Davis was born on August 3, 1883 in Boiceville, New York. He was the son of Millard H. Davis and Ella Weidner.

=== Legal career ===
Davis attended New York Law School. He was admitted to the bar in 1904 and practiced law in New York City with the firm Cravath, Swaine and Moore. In 1917, he left his law practice and moved to Arrowhead Farm in Kerkonkson, which became one of the most successful farms in the area. He was a director of the Dairymen's League and served as county president of the fifth district from 1919 to 1953. He was a director of the Accord Farmers Cooperative Association, serving as its president from 1930 to 1945. He was justice of the peace for his town. He served as president of the Ulster County Farm and 4-H Club Association for 10 years. He was president of the New York State Agricultural Society and, through that office, a trustee of Cornell University from 1938 to 1939. He was also a director of the Olive Cooperative Fire Insurance Cooperation.

=== Political career ===
In 1924, Davis was elected to the New York State Assembly as a Republican, representing Ulster County. He served in the Assembly from 1925 to 1932.

=== Personal life ===
Davis attended the Rochester Reformed Church of Accord. He was an active member of the social organization Grange in Accord. In 1922, he married Roswitha Kudlich. Their children were Ann Meredith and Philip.

=== Death ===
Davis died in Veterans Memorial Hospital in Ellenville on September 15, 1957. He was buried in Pine Bush Cemetery.

New York State Assembly
Preceded by Simon B. Van Wagenen	New York State Assembly; Ulster County; 1925–1932	Succeeded by J. Edward Conway
