= Jasper W. Cornaire =

American lawyer, judge, and politician

Personal details
- Born: March 12, 1877 Cape Vincent, New York
- Died: August 15, 1937 (aged 60) Cape Vincent, New York
- Party: Republican
- Education: Albany Law School (JD)

Member of the New York State Assembly for Jefferson County
- In office January 1, 1925 – December 31, 1926
- Preceded by: H. Edmund Machold
- Succeeded by: Alfred E. Emerson
- Majority: Republican

Member of the New York State Assembly for Jefferson County
- In office January 1, 1928 – December 31, 1934
- Preceded by: Alfred E. Emerson
- Succeeded by: Russell Wright
- Majority: Republican (1928-1932); Democratic (1933-1934)

Jasper W. Cornaire (March 12, 1877 – August 15, 1937) was an American lawyer, judge, and politician from New York.

== Life ==
Cornaire was born on March 12, 1877, in Cape Vincent, New York, the son of Louis Cornaire and Belle Herrick. His father was a farmer and the son of French immigrants.

Cornaire attended school in Three Mile Bay and Clayton, and went to high school in Rochester. From 1896 to 1899, he studied law in the office of Thomas Raines in Rochester. He then went to Albany Law School from 1899 to 1900. After he was admitted to the bar, he practiced law in Clayton for a year and then moved to Cape Vincent. In 1912, he became special Surrogate Judge of Jefferson County, an office he was re-elected to in 1914, 1917, and 1920. He was chairman of the Jefferson County Republican Committee from 1921 to 1926. In 1928, he moved to Watertown and practiced there as senior member of the firm Cornaire & Donaldson.

In 1924, Cornaire was elected to the New York State Assembly as a Republican, representing Jefferson County. He served in the Assembly in from 1925 to 1926 and from 1928 to 1934 After the end of his term in November 1934, he was appointed assistant counsel to the Joint Legislature Committee on Reappointment.

Cornaire attended St. John's Episcopal Church. He was a member of the Jefferson County Bar Association, the New York State Bar Association, the Freemasons, the Royal Arch Masonry, the Knights Templar, the Elks, the Fraternal Order of Eagles, the Loyal Order of Moose, and Phi Delta Phi. He never married.

Cornaire died at his cottage near Burnham Point State Park on August 15, 1937. He was buried in the St. Lawrence Union Cemetery.

New York State Assembly
Preceded by H. Edmund Machold	New York State Assembly; Jefferson County; 1925–1926	Succeeded by Alfred E. Emerson
Preceded by Alfred E. Emerson	New York State Assembly; Jefferson County; 1928–1934	Succeeded by Russell Wright
