= James W. Watson =

American politician

James W. Watson was an American politician. He was a member of the Wisconsin State Assembly during the 1889 and 1891 sessions. Watson represented the 2nd District of Fond du Lac County, Wisconsin. He was a Democrat. Watson was born on February 14, 1849, in Roxburghshire, Scotland.
