= De Rham =

De Rham may refer to:

== People ==
- Charles de Rham (1822–1909), American merchant
- Claudia de Rham (b. 1978), Swiss theoretical physicist
- Henry Casimir de Rham (1785–1873), Swiss–American merchant and diplomat
- Jeanne de Rham (1892–1965), American politician and philanthropist
- Georges de Rham (1903–1990), Swiss mathematician
- William de Rham (b. 1922), Swiss equestrian

== Places ==
- DeRham Farm in Philipstown, New York

== Businesses ==
- De Rham, Iselin & Moore

== Other uses ==
- De Rham curve
- De Rham cohomology
- De Rham invariant
- De Rham–Weil theorem
- Hodge–de Rham spectral sequence
