= R. Stuyvesant Pierrepont =

American businessman (1882–1950)

Captain Rutherfurd Stuyvesant Pierrepont (July 5, 1882 – December 14, 1950) was an American society leader, coal company executive and banker.

== Early life ==
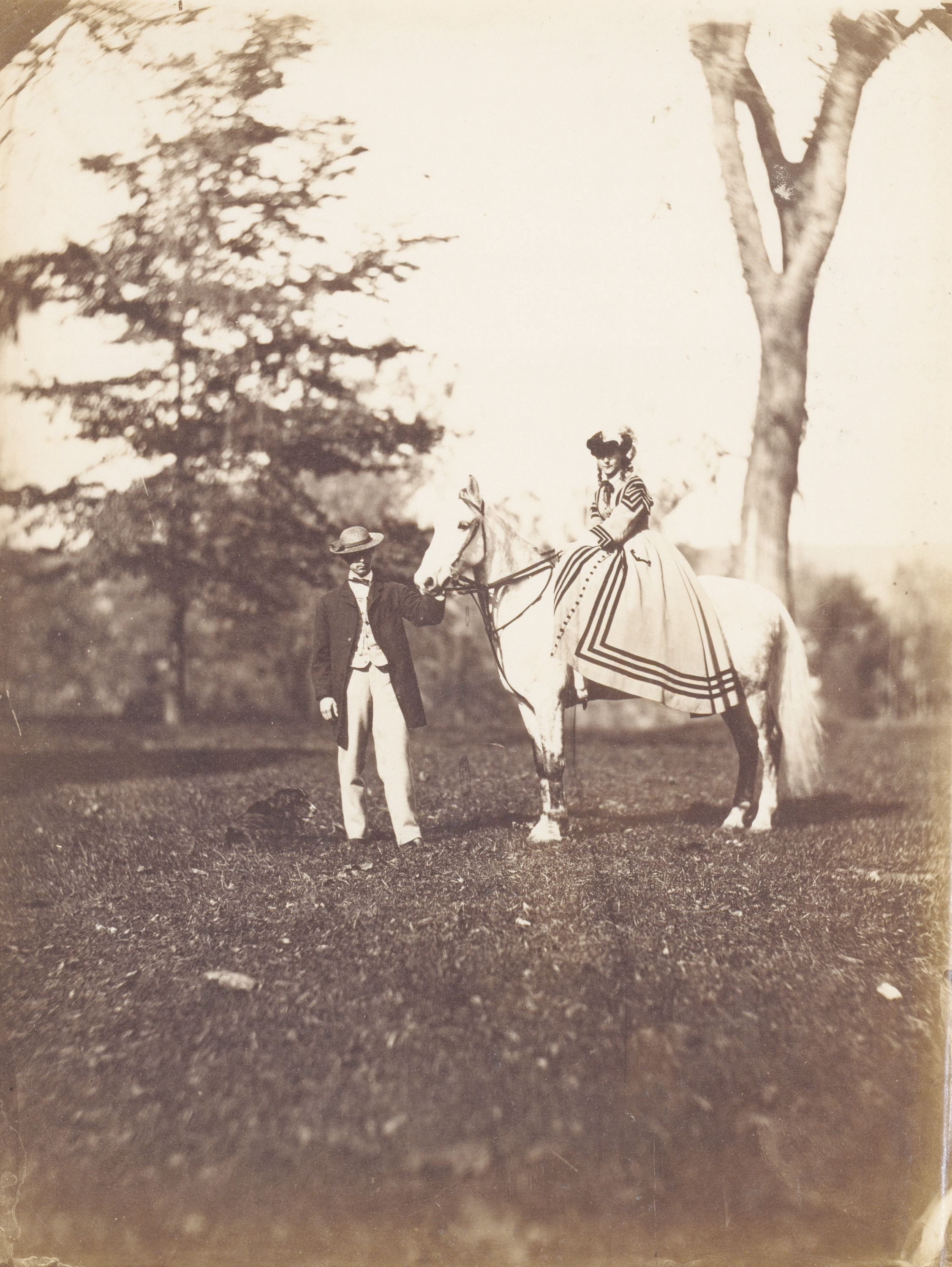
Photograph of his maternal aunt, Mary Pierrepont, and her husband (and his namesake), Rutherfurd Stuyvesant, c. 1863

Pierrepont was born on July 5, 1882 at Lake Luzerne, New York. He was a son of Brooklyn merchant Henry Evelyn Pierrepont II (1845–1911), and Ellen Almira Low (1846–1884). Among his siblings was the diplomat and politician Seth Low Pierrepont.

His paternal grandparents were Anna Maria (née Jay) Pierrepont (a granddaughter of John Jay, first Chief Justice of the United States) and Henry Evelyn Pierrepont (a descendant of the Rev. James Pierrepont, a founder of Yale College). His uncle was the financier John Jay Pierrepont and his aunt, Mary Pierrepont, was the wife of Rutherfurd Stuyvesant. His maternal grandparents were merchant Abiel Abbot Low and, his first wife, Ellen Almira. His maternal uncles included Abbot Augustus Low, an inventor, and Seth Low, who was the Mayor of New York from 1902 and 1903. Through his sister Ellen, he was an uncle of Elizabeth Barclay Moffat, who married Ambassador John Campbell White (a nephew of Rutherfurd Stuyvesant); Jay Pierrepont Moffat, the U.S. Ambassador to Canada; and Abbot Low Moffat, a member of the New York State Assembly.

Pierrepont was educated at St. Mark's School and Columbia University, where he graduated in 1905. He was on the college's freshman and varsity four and eight oared crews and belonged to the Delta Psi fraternity (also known as St. Anthony Hall).

== Career ==
Pierrepont began his career with the Keokee Consolidated Coal and Coke Company of Virginia, he later served for many years as a director of the Franklin Trust Company, Brooklyn, and of the Bank of America, which absorbed it in 1920 (which became First National City Bank of New York in 1955 and then, Citibank, in 1976). He also served as a director of the Stonega Coke and Coal, Virginia Coal and Iron, Interstate Railroad and Fidelity and Casualty Companies, and of Green-Wood Cemetery, Brooklyn, which had been laid out by his grandfather.

He was a trustee of Brooklyn Hospital, the East Side House Settlement and of St. Bernard's School in Gladstone, New Jersey. He was a vestryman of St. Luke's Protestant Episcopal Church in Gladstone and of Bethesda Church in Palm Beach, Florida, where he had a summer home. An avid outdoorsman and sportsman, his farm in New Jersey was well-known for its up-to-date agricultural methods, and he was a winner of the Essex Fox Hunt Steeplechase.

=== Military career ===
Pierrepont enlisted on February 6, 1909, in Troop 1, Squadron New York National Guard out of New York City. On December 6, 1911, Squadron A was reviewed by Secretary of War Henry L. Stimson, the same day it was reorganized into First Regiment Cavalry. He was assigned to Troop A before being discharged in 1912. During World War I, he served as a First lieutenant in the Army Air Corps. A "qualified balloon observer", he was promoted to Captain.

== Personal life ==
On December 5, 1911, Pierrepont was married to Nathalie Leon de Castro (1885–1973) at Cedarmere in Roslyn, New York, the country home of her uncle, Harold Godwin. Nathalie, a daughter of Annie (née Godwin) de Castro and Alfred de Castro, was a granddaughter of journalist Parke Godwin and great-granddaughter of William Cullen Bryant (who built Cedarmere). Together, they were the parents of:

- Mary Rutherfurd Pierrepont (1912–1960), who married Fentress Hill Kuhn.
- Rutherfurd Stuyvesant Pierrepont Jr. (1914–1995), who married Ford Agency model Mary Owings "Molly" Shriver, a daughter of Joseph Nicholas Shriver of Baltimore.
- John Pierrepont (1916–2001), a financier with Delafield & Delafield; he married Nancy (née Weller) Dewey, the widow of Lt.-Col. A. Peter Dewey, who was killed in Indo-China in 1945 while serving with the Office of Strategic Services and the daughter of Joseph I. Weller, in 1950.

Pierrepont died in his home in Far Hills, New Jersey on December 14, 1950 at the age of 68.
