= William McCormack (disambiguation) =

William McCormack was premier of Queensland.

William McCormack may also refer to:

- William J. McCormack (police officer) (1933–2016), chief of police of the Metro Toronto Police
- William Jerome McCormack (1924–2013), American prelate of Roman Catholic Church
- William J. McCormack (businessman) (1890–1965), New York City businessman
- William McCormack (cricketer) (1877–1946), Australian cricketer

== See also ==
- Will McCormack (born 1974), American television and film actor
- Billy McCormack (disambiguation)
- John W. McCormack (John William McCormack, 1891–1980), speaker of the United States House of Representatives
- William McCormick (disambiguation)
