= William F. Smith (New York politician) =

American politician

William F. Smith (February 9, 1901 – July 26, 1950) was an American lawyer and politician from New York.

== Life ==
Smith was born on February 9, 1901, in New York City, New York, the son of Dr. Joseph J. Smith.

Smith graduated from St. Jerome's Parochial School in 1914 and from Regis High School in 1918. He then spent a year in Fordham College, after which he went to Fordham University School of Law in 1919. He graduated from the latter university with an LL.B. in 1922. He was admitted to the bar in 1924, after which he maintained a law office at 291 Broadway while living in the Bronx. In 1925, he was elected to the New York State Assembly as a Democrat, representing the Bronx County 2nd District. He served in the Assembly in 1926, 1927, 1928, 1929, 1930, 1931, 1932, and 1933. In his last term in the Assembly, he joined a group of up-state Republicans to defeat a bill that would have continued an additional 1-cent tax on gasoline. He then served as an Assistant District Attorney of Bronx County from 1933 until his death. He was in the Army at one point, but he was discharged due to disability shortly after the outbreak of World War II. He avoided active trial work in the last few years of his life.

Smith was a member of the Regis High Alumni Association, the Fordham Alumni Association, the New York State District Attorneys Association, the New York State Bar Association, the Bronx County Bar Association, the American Bar Association, the Guild of Catholic Lawyers, and the Society of Medical Jurisprudence. He married Marian L. Peacock of Brooklyn in 1935. She died in 1937.

Smith died in Roosevelt Hospital from a long illness on July 26, 1950. He was buried in St. Raymond's Cemetery.

New York State Assembly
| Preceded by Lester W. Patterson | New York State Assembly; Bronx County, 2nd District; 1926–1933 | Succeeded by Doris I. Byrne |
