= Lester W. Patterson =

American lawyer, politician, and judge

Lester Winfield Patterson
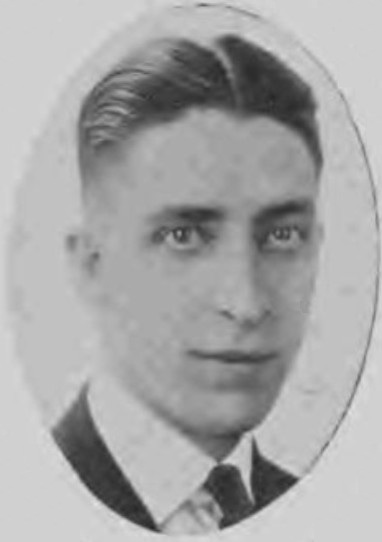
- Patterson in 1922

County Judge of the Bronx

Bronx County Clerk
- In office 1930–1934
- Preceded by: Robert L. Moran

5th Sheriff of Bronx County, New York
- In office 1925–1930
- Preceded by: Edward J. Flynn
- Succeeded by: Robert L. Moran

Member of the New York State Assembly from Bronx County's 2nd district
- In office January 1, 1922 – December 31, 1925
- Preceded by: Edward J. Flynn
- Succeeded by: William F. Smith

Personal details
- Born: July 24, 1893 Bronx, New York City
- Died: November 15, 1947 (aged 54) Mount Sinai Hospital
- Party: Democrat
- Education: Fordham College
- Alma mater: Fordham Law School
- Profession: lawyer

Military service
- Allegiance: United States
- Branch/service: Army
- Years of service: 1917 - 1919
- Unit: 105th Field Artillery

Lester Winfield Patterson (July 24, 1893 – November 15, 1947) was an American lawyer, politician, and judge from New York.

== Life ==
Patterson was born on July 24, 1893, in the lower Bronx, New York City. He was the son of Edward J. Patterson, cashier for Bronx County clerk Vincent J. Ganley and Surrogate George M. S. Schultz, and Lillian C.

Patterson grew up on the lower end of the Bronx. He attended St. Jerome's Parochial School. He graduated from Fordham Preparatory School in 1911, Fordham College with a B.A. in 1915, and Fordham Law School in 1917. After graduating from the latter school, he enlisted in the Army and served overseas with the 105th Field Artillery as a first lieutenant. He was admitted to the bar in 1920 and had a law office in the Bronx. After he was discharged from the Army in 1919, he became a captain in the Officers Reserve Corps.

In 1921, Patterson was elected to the New York State Assembly as a Democrat, representing the Bronx County 2nd District. He served in the Assembly in 1922, 1923, 1924, and 1925. In 1925, he was elected Sheriff of Bronx County. He held the office from 1926 to 1930. He then served as County Clerk for four years. He was then elected County Judge, a position he was re-elected to shortly before his death.

Patterson was a member of St. Gabriel's Church in Riverdale when he died, although he previously attended St. Jerome's Church. He was a member of the Elks, the Knights of Columbus, the Lions Club, and the Winged Foot Golf Club. In 1926, he married Ethyle Madeline Lang. Their children were Joan, Eunice, and Ellis.

Patterson died at Mount Sinai Hospital on November 15, 1947. He was buried in the Gate of Heaven Cemetery.

The Patterson Houses in Mott Haven was named after him.

== See also ==
- 145th New York State Legislature (1922)
- 145th New York State Legislature (1923)
- 145th New York State Legislature (1924)
- 145th New York State Legislature (1925)

New York State Assembly
Preceded by Edward J. Flynn	New York State Assembly; Bronx County, 2nd District; 1922–1925	Succeeded by William F. Smith
