= William McCormick =

William McCormick may refer to:

- William McCormick (diplomat) (born 1939), American diplomat
- William McCormick (businessman) (1742–1815), Scottish-born merchant in North Carolina
- William McCormick (Upper Canada politician) (1784–1840), Canadian businessman, author and politician
- William McCormick (MP) (1801–1878), Conservative Londonderry City MP
- William E. McCormick (1831–1900), American lawyer, businessman, and politician from New York
- William Grigsby McCormick (1851–1941), American businessman
- William Sanderson McCormick (1815–1865), businessman from Virginia operated reaper business in Chicago
- William McCormick (literary scholar) (1859–1930), Scottish-born scholar and educational administrator
- Barry McCormick (William Joseph McCormick, 1874–1956), American baseball player
- Bill McCormick (Canadian football) (born c. 1928), Canadian football player
- Fergie McCormick (William Fergus McCormick, 1939–2018), New Zealand rugby player
- William McCormick (physician), Canadian physician and nutritionist

== See also ==
- William M. Blair (William McCormick Blair, 1884–1982), American financier
- William McCormick Blair Jr. (1916–2015), American diplomat
- William McCormack (disambiguation)
