= Robert L. Moran =

American politician

Robert Lawrence Moran
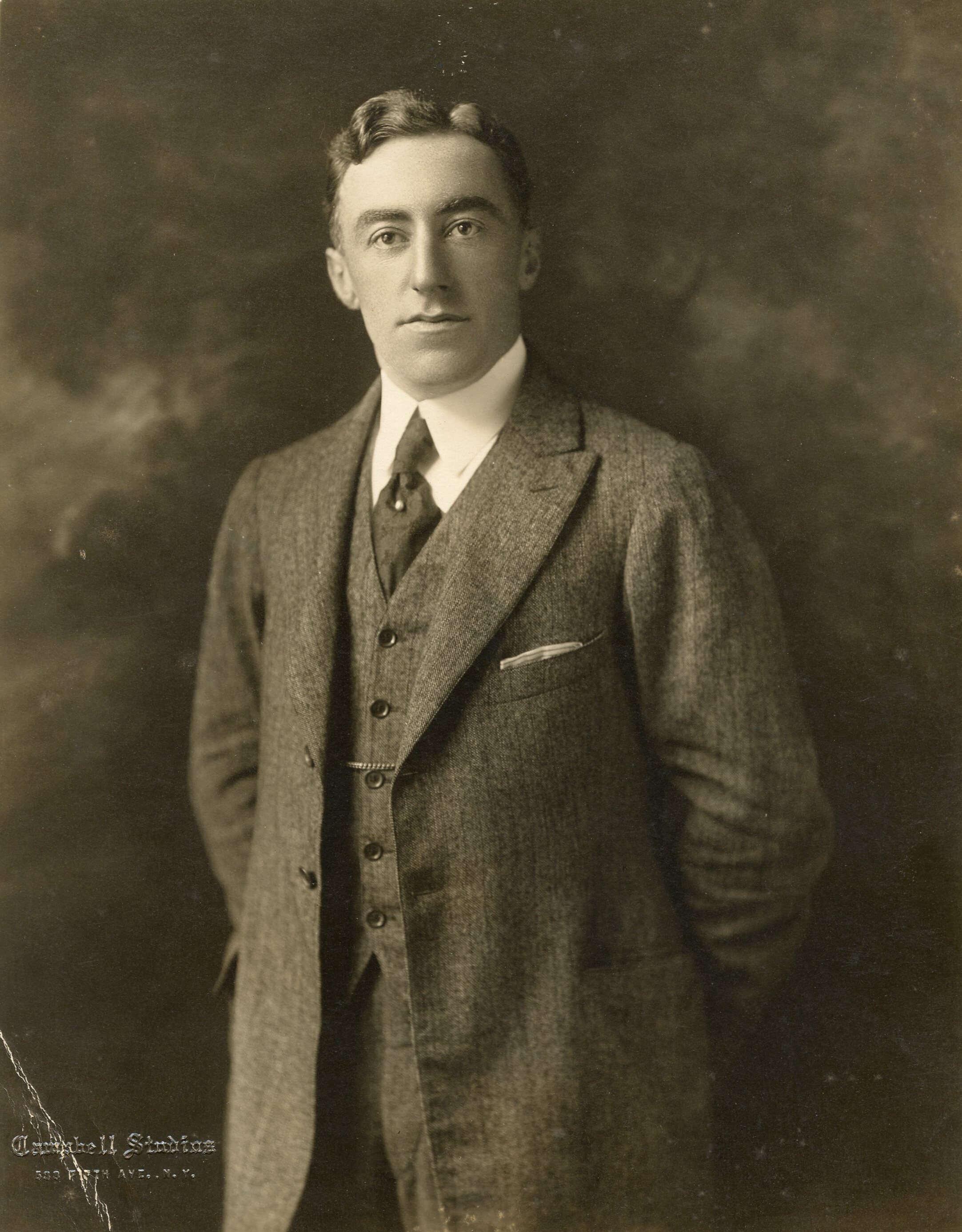

8th President of the New York City Board of Aldermen
- In office January 1, 1919 – December 31, 1919
- Preceded by: Alfred E. Smith
- Succeeded by: Fiorello H. LaGuardia

Bronx County Clerk
- In office January 3, 1920 – December 31, 1929
- Preceded by: Joseph M. Callahan
- Succeeded by: Lester W. Patterson

6th Sheriff of Bronx County
- In office January 1, 1930 – December 31, 1933
- Preceded by: Lester W. Patterson
- Succeeded by: John J. Hanley

Bronx Commissioner of Public Works
- In office January 1, 1934 – May 9, 1942
- Preceded by: William J. Flynn
- Succeeded by: Arthur V. Sheridan

Personal details
- Born: October 3, 1884 Manhattan, New York City, New York, U.S.
- Died: August 19, 1954 (aged 69) The Bronx, New York
- Political party: Democratic
- Spouse: Eileen Kelly

Robert Lawrence Moran (October 3, 1884 – August 19, 1954), was a Bronxite politician who served as president of the Board of Aldermen of New York City from 1918 to 1920, filling a vacancy after Alfred E. Smith was elected Governor of New York. Nominated by the Democratic Party to succeed himself as board president, Moran faced Republican Representative Fiorello H. La Guardia in the election of 1919, losing by a plurality of 1,363 votes. Moran has the distinction of being the only citizen of The Bronx to ever exercise the authority of mayor of New York City, even though this honor came to him only in his capacity as acting mayor during Mayor Hylan's absences from the city.

== Early life ==
Moran was born on October 3, 1884, in Manhattan on East Twentieth Street. He was the second of six children born to Eugene (b. 1856) and Delia Moran (formerly Fitzpatrick, b. 1860 in Brooklyn). His father, a native of Greenwich Village, was a member of the New York Parks Police Department, 21st Precinct, where he began as a gatekeeper in 1879, and was subsequently promoted to park-keeper on June 9, 1886, and to roundsman the following year. He retired as a sergeant on pension in March 1912, dying not long afterward during the typhoid epidemic of 1912.

Robert Moran was raised in the Gashouse District and educated in the public schools of his native city. After his father's death, the family moved to 1486 St. Lawrence Street in The Bronx. The family later moved to 1565 Leland Avenue in The Bronx, where Moran resided until his death in 1954. As a young man, he attended P.S. 100 before leaving to take a factory job. He took real estate courses at the Young Men's Christian Association and attended night school at New York University for two years. Moran entered the real estate business in The Bronx and among the many operations with which he was connected was the construction of the Theodore Roosevelt Apartments on the Grand Concourse.

== Entry into politics ==
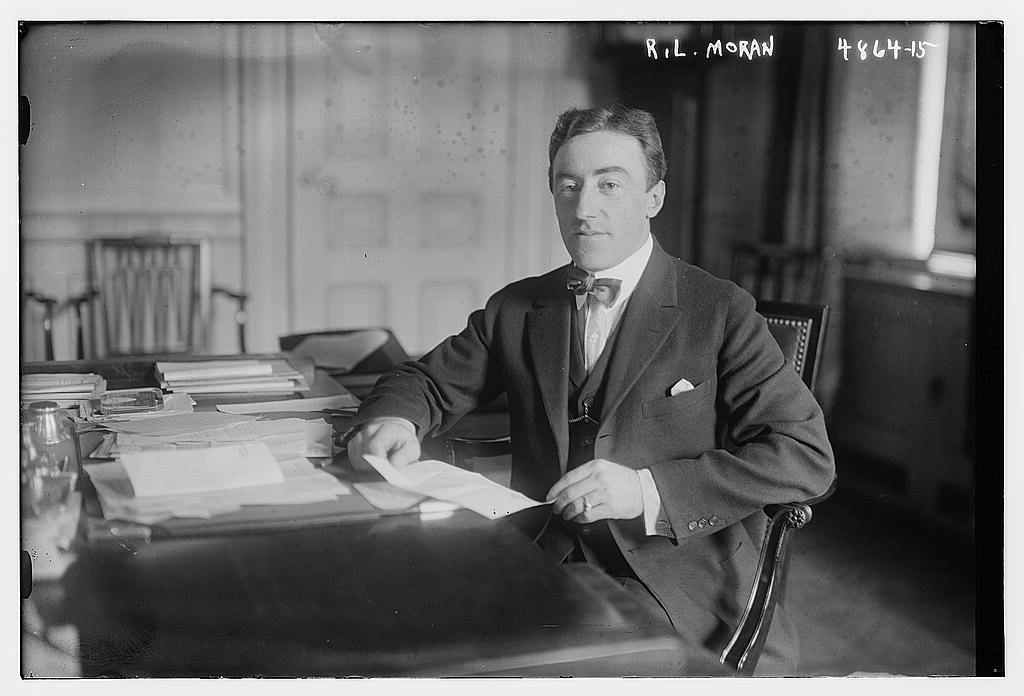
Robert L. Moran Alderman 1915

Moran entered municipal politics in 1913, when Bronx Democrats selected him to run against the Fusionists in an aldermanic contest, which he won. When Frank L. Dowling succeeded George McAneny as president of the Board of Aldermen, Moran was chosen to fill Dowling's place as majority leader. When Alfred E. Smith, later governor of New York, was elected president of the Board of Aldermen in 1916, Moran was made vice-chairman by the votes of his fellow members, and was re-elected to that position upon the reorganization of the board in 1917. Moran became president of the board on January 1, 1919, when Mr. Smith resigned to assume the office of governor.

== President of the Board of Aldermen and acting mayor 1919 ==
As president of the Board of Aldermen, Moran was acting mayor on many occasions. During his tenure, Moran organized the League for the Preservation of Sunday Recreation and presided over the amending of the New York City Code of Ordinances to allow for the playing of baseball games and showing of movies on Sunday. He made possible the condemnation and acquisition of the principal street-surface railroad companies by New York City and opposed the introduction of "transfer charges" and higher subway fares. He created the Bureau of Steam Heat Supply and established a municipal steam heating plant to supply heat at reasonable prices to the citizens of New York. Moran was also instrumental in approving construction of the 125th Street Bridge in Harlem, the construction of a public boathouse at Central Park, and public bathhouses at Pelham Bay Park and Coney Island.

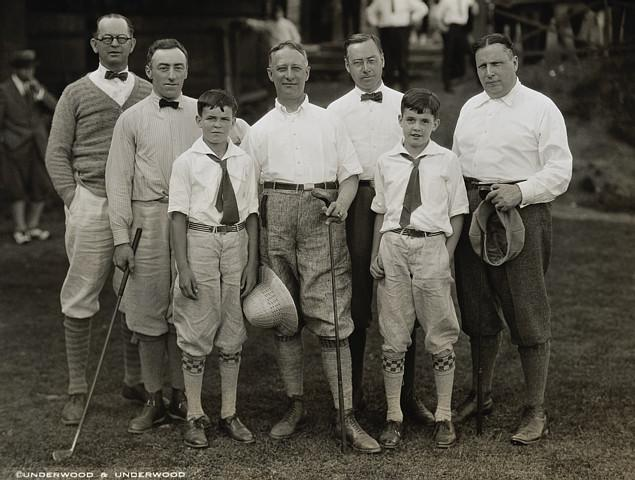
Golfing at Lake Placid, left to right, Judge John McInery (with sons), Robert L. Moran, Governor Smith, Judge W.F. Haggerty and Senator J.J. Hoey.

He retained the Daylight Saving Law in New York City after it was repealed as a federal measure, amended the code of ordinances relating to prices charged by public carts and cartmen, prevented the erection of a garbage disposal plant in The Bronx and played a significant role on the Committee Appointed to Welcome Homecoming Troops of the American Expeditionary Force and to ensure the re-employment of returning servicemen.

In addition, Moran led numerous attempts to dismantle the monopoly in milk production and distribution held by the upstate Co-operative Association of Farmers and Dairymen and advocated for the establishment of a municipal Department of Milk Supply and Distribution to be run by New York City. He also testified before the Lockwood Committee of the New York State Senate to relieve the housing situation and endorsed Governor Smith's proposed legislation for the protection of workers, among them, for the establishment of a Minimum Wage Commission for women and minors and the creation of a health insurance system.

While an alderman, Moran served on the Finance Committee, Rules Committee, Markets Committee, Salaries and Grades Committee and the Legislature Committee. In the Board of Estimate, he was the chairman of the Transit Committee, the Assessment Committee, and the Salaries and Grades Committee, and was a member of the Finance and Budget Committee, Franchise Committee, Sinking Fund Committee and Armory Board.

=== 1919 Aldermanic election ===
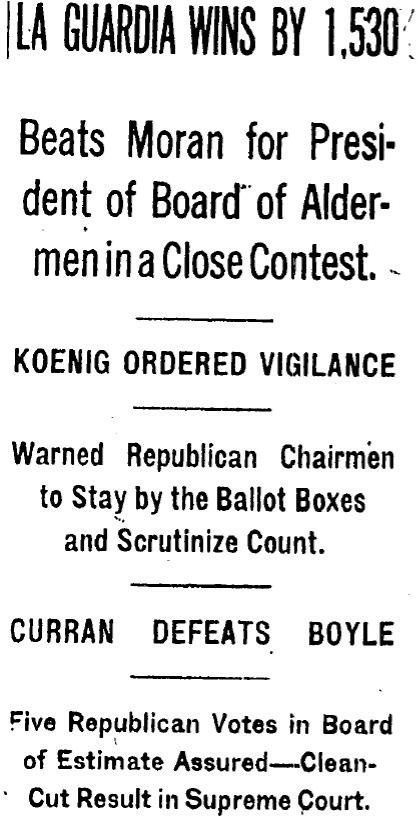
New York Times Front Page Nov. 5, 1919

In 1919, Moran was chosen by Tammany Hall to run as the Democratic candidate to succeed himself as president of the Board of Aldermen in the November election. Moran's republican opponent was United States Congressman and former Deputy New York Attorney General Fiorello H. LaGuardia. Michael "Dynamite Mike" Kelly, the popular commander of New York's Third "Shamrock" Battalion, also joined the race on the ticket of the Liberty Party. Kelly was a war hero and recipient of the Distinguished Service Cross and Croix de Guerre. His campaign was supported by the notorious Jeremiah A. O'Leary and a small group of Irish Americans who opposed the League of Nations and advocated recognition of the Irish Republic. Tammany looked with alarm upon Kelly's entrance into the campaign and tried to persuade him to withdraw his candidacy and throw his support behind Moran. When he refused, the Tammany chiefs went to the New York Supreme Court to remove Kelly's name from the ballot, pointing out that 547 of the 3,491 signatories to Kelly's nomination petition had failed to register or otherwise comply with election laws. The Supreme Court agreed and ordered that Kelly's name be stricken from the ballot, a ruling later upheld by the Appellate Division.

In the late summer of 1919 Moran fell ill, attributing his abdominal pains to ptomaine poisoning. When the pain receded by late September, he assumed the ailment had passed and did not consult a physician. But on September 30, upon returning home from the funeral of Manhattan Borough president Dowling, Moran felt decidedly worse, and the next day was rushed to Lincoln Hospital, where doctors discovered gangrenous appendicitis. Surgery was performed successfully by Moran's friend, the former health commissioner Dr. J. Lewis Amster, and Moran left the hospital on October 26, 1919, carrying over 15,000 cards and letters sent to him by friends during his illness. He recovered completely, but the crucial last days of his election campaign against LaGuardia found him confined to a sickbed.

Although Moran had been the heavy favorite going into the election, and despite the absence of Kelly's name on the ballot, when Election Day arrived, more than 3,500 of Kelly's supporters wrote his name on the ballot. This was sufficient to defeat Moran, who lost to LaGuardia by 1,363 votes. The election of 1919 was devastating to Tammany, and also brought defeat to Edward F. Boyle in the contest for the Manhattan Borough presidency.

== County Clerk and Bronx County Sheriff ==
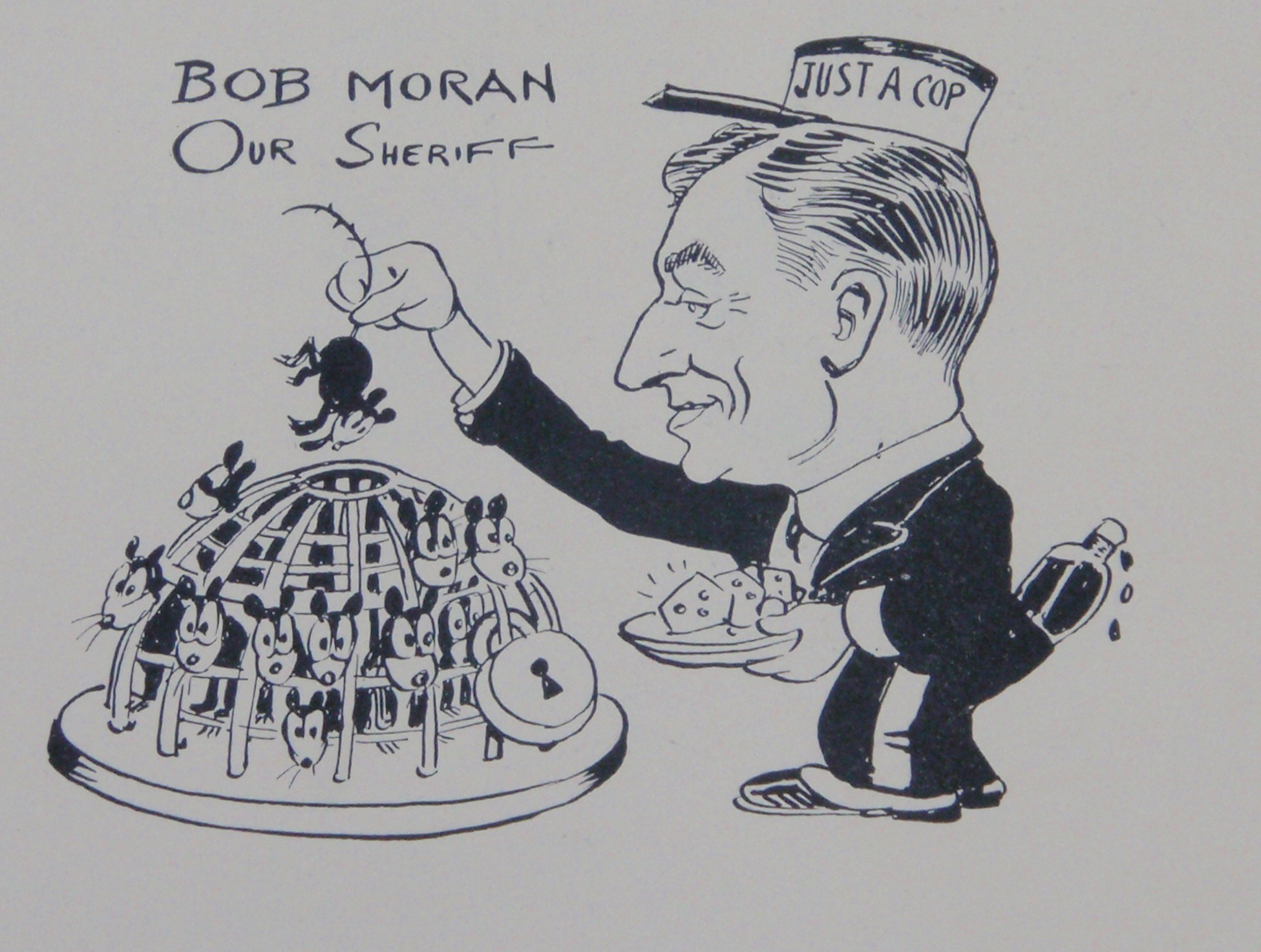
A cartoon from "On The Pan".

On January 3, 1920, Governor Smith appointed Moran as Clerk of Bronx County to fill the unexpired term of Joseph M. Callahan, who had been elected to the City Court. Governor Smith appointed Moran with the understanding that Moran was to become a candidate for the remaining year of the term as County Clerk at the November 1920 election. In 1921 Moran's supporters had been urging him to seek the Democratic nomination to succeed the ailing Henry Bruckner as Bronx Borough president. When Moran offered himself for re-election to a full term as County Clerk, he was elected by a large majority and was re-elected again in November 1925. On 11 June 1927, during his tenure as Bronx County Clerk, Moran married Ms. Eileen Kelly, the daughter of prominent Bronx Attorney Peter C. Kelly.

In 1929 Moran was elected sheriff of the Bronx, taking office on January 1, 1930. As sheriff, Moran gained notoriety for refusing to jail members of the National Guard who had been sentenced to serve short prison terms for failing to appear at drill. The jail's lack of accommodations for non-criminal prisoners meant that guardsmen, some just 17 years old, had to be confined with violent felons. Moran argued that "in time of peace and especially now, with distress and unemployment, the military law should not be enforced to extremes" and that no consideration had been given as to whether the boy prisoners were ill, had dependents or might lose their jobs. So strongly did Moran object that the situation could only be resolved by the issuance of a writ of mandamus compelling him to act.

At one point, in April 1933, the Bronx jail held 17 prisoners, all charged with first degree Murder and sentenced to die in the electric chair. The most famous, although not a murderer, was Lottie Coll, the widow of gangland chief Vincent "Mad Dog" Coll, who had been gunned down by a machine gun as he stood in an Eighth Avenue phone booth.

=== Seabury Commission investigations ===
In January 1932 a civil injunction suit was filed against William J. Flynn, the Bronx Commissioner of Public Works since 1918, alleging that Flynn was using the influence of his office to steer city construction contracts to his political friends. The suit further alleged that Flynn, acting as borough president during the frequent absences of Henry R. Bruckner, manipulated the issuance of construction contracts to establish himself as a "virtual dictator of the building trades in the borough." One such contract was a $100,000 contract on the new Bronx County Municipal Building awarded to United Sand and Gravel, a company owned by Moran, waterfront power broker William J. McCormack (businessman), and former assistant district attorney Edward J. Chapman.

Although the civil suit was ultimately dismissed, the allegations led to a citywide investigation of borough governments by Samuel Seabury, counsel to the Hofstadter Committee. Thousands of public officials were called before the commission to testify. Following the testimony of New York County Sheriff Thomas M. Farley, Seabury convened a grand jury to investigate the alleged practice of retaining interest accrued on official deposits by county sheriffs. Farley and his predecessor Charles W. Culkin were accused of embezzling over $25,000 in interest.

Despite assertions by the Democratic minority on the investigating committee that sheriffs everywhere had always helped themselves to the accrual of interest, in a private interview Moran told investigators that it was his practice to turn any such interest over to the city chamberlain for disbursement. Moran also produced the books of his office showing that no interest had accrued to the $1,400 in official deposits he had made in the past two years. At the time, Seabury noted that Moran appeared to be the only sheriff in New York City who didn't keep a tin box in his desk.

The Seabury investigation continued for two years and lead to the indictment of Deputy City Clerk James J. McCormick, the arrest of State Senator John A. Hastings, and the eventual resignation of Mayor James Walker.

== Bronx Commissioner of Public Works ==
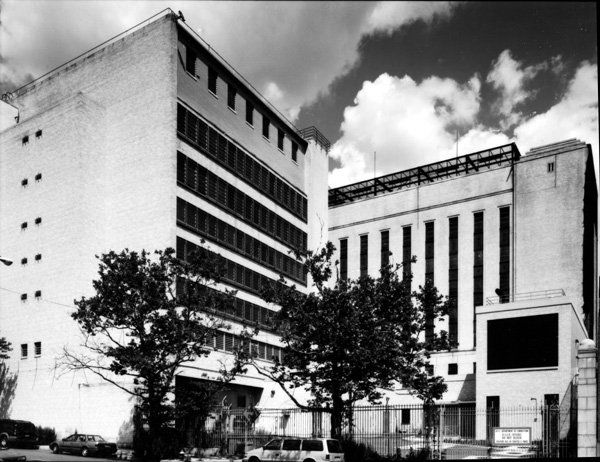
The former Bronx House of Detention. It is currently the site of the Gateway Center at Bronx Terminal Market.

Moran was named Bronx Commissioner of Public Works by borough president James J. Lyons on December 31, 1933. As commissioner, Moran was instrumental in the dredging and straightening of the Hutchinson River, and the construction of a new Bronx House of Detention, and the easterly approach to the Triborough Bridge in time for the 1939 World's Fair. This approach was later expanded to become the Major Deegan Expressway.

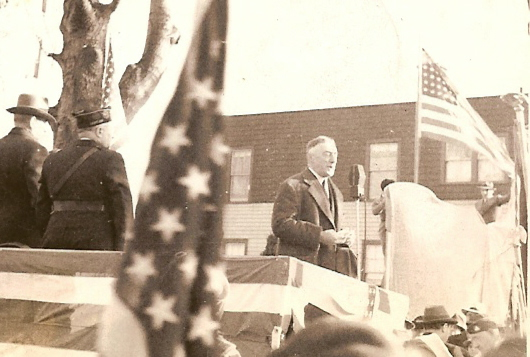
Commissioner Moran addresses the crowd, The Bronx, N.Y. 1943

Moran retired from his position as commissioner in May 1942, under fire from District Attorney Samuel J. Foley in the Edward J. Flynn paving job investigation. Flynn, the Democratic National Chairman and Bronx party leader, had been nominated by President Franklin D. Roosevelt to be ambassador to Australia. An investigation into his affairs revealed that timesheets of three employees of the Bronx Bureau of Sewer and Highway Maintenance had been altered to convey the impression that they were on "vacation" when they had been engaged in the construction of an antique Belgian courtyard at Flynn's Lake Mahopac home, using second-hand city paving blocks. A grand jury later cleared everyone involved in the matter of any wrongdoing.

== Later life and death ==
After his resignation, Moran returned to his previous occupation in real estate. His offices were in the Busher Building, 349 East 149th Street in the Bronx. Moran was an active member in The Bronx Board of Trade as well as The Bronx Catholic Club, The Knights of Columbus, The Benevolent and Protective Order of Elks and The Bronx Rotary Club, where he was elected president. He also served as a member of the New York State Home Rule Commission, and helped to frame laws establishing home rule for municipalities in New York State.

Moran died in the Westchester Square Hospital on August 18, 1954, at the age of 69 and is buried in Queens, New York. He was survived by his wife and seven children.
