= Jeanne de Rham =

American politician and philanthropist (1892–1965)

Jeanne de Rham (née King; 1892 – December 24, 1965) was an American politician and philanthropist.

== Early life ==
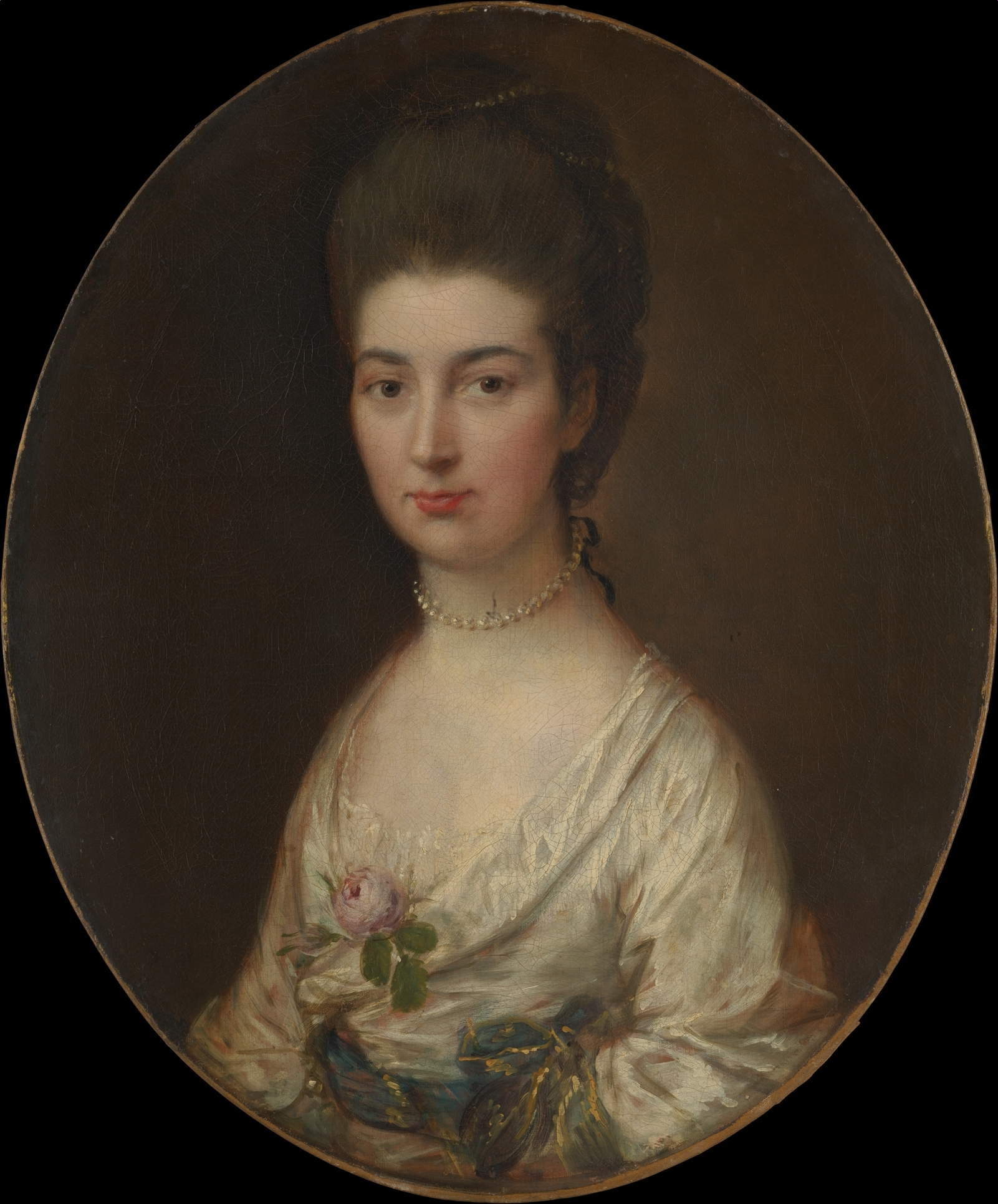
Portrait of Mrs. Ralph Izard (née Alice De Lancey), by Thomas Gainsborough, c. 1747–1788

She was one of four surviving children of Mary Elizabeth (née Lyon) King (b. 1856) and David Hazlitt King Jr. (1850–1916), a real estate developer and construction engineer who supervised the construction of the Statute of Liberty. Among her siblings were Van Rensselaer Choate King, (Note: Jeanne's brother, Van Rensselaer Choate King (1880–1927), died in an earthquake in Kobe, Japan.) Ruth King (who married Baron de Villiers du Terrage), (Note: Jean Maurice Marie Marc, Baron de Villiers du Terrage was a son of the Vicomte and Vicomtesse de Villiers du Terrage. His father was chargé d'affaires at London, Berlin and Madrid before serving as the head of the French Red Cross Bureau during the War. His mother was a daughter of the Count de la Fons des Essarts. The Baron is related to the de La Fayette family and one of his ancestors, the Louis Billouart, Chevalier de Kerlérec, was Governor of Louisiana when it was a French province.) Dorothy King (wife of Stanley Griswold Flagg).

Her father built a cottage on Jekyll Island in 1897 known as Chichota. The unique cottage was "a single-storied, Italian Renaissance house surrounding a central courtyard, complete with a swimming pool fed by an artesian well. After the property was severely damaged in 1898 during one of the worst hurricanes in Jekyll Island history, King sold Chichota to Edwin Gould just three years after construction."

== Career ==
After World War I, de Rham helped to organize the Dugout, an organization that assisted disabled combat veterans earn a livelihood by teaching them new skills and restoring old skills.

After establishing a home known as J.D.R. Ranch in Jackson Hole, Wyoming in the 1930s, where she relocated part-time because of ill health, she began raising "prize beef cattle". In addition she served as a Republican State Committeewoman in Wyoming for twenty years.

=== Art collection ===
De Rham bequeathed a portrait of Mrs. Ralph Izard (née Alice De Lancey), by Thomas Gainsborough, to the Metropolitan Museum of Art in memory of her father. Her father had acquired the portrait in c. 1912 from Dr. Robert Watts, the sitter's great-grandson.

== Personal life ==
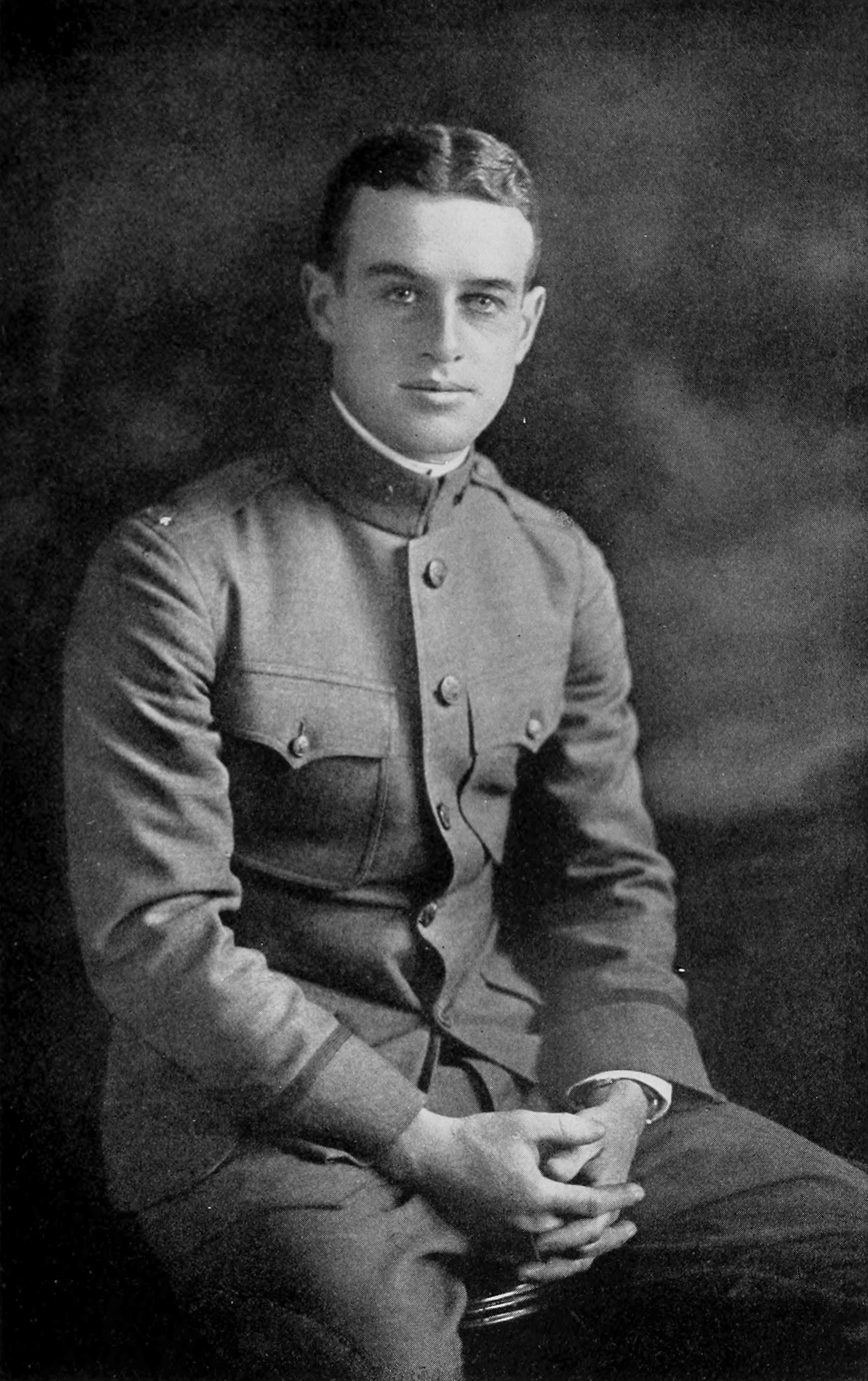
Photograph of her husband, Charles de Rham III, who died in France during World War I

On April 12, 1918, she was married to Lt. Charles de Rham III (1888–1918) at the Long Island Hotel in Riverhead by Chaplain Duncan H. Brown of the 305th Infantry. Charles, who was then stationed at Camp Upton, was a son of Charles de Rham Jr. and Emily Hone (née Foster) de Rham. He was a grandson of Charles de Rham and great-grandson of Henry Casimir de Rham, a Swiss merchant and diplomat who was appointed one of the first two Swiss consuls to the U.S. in 1822. Sadly, they were only married a few months before his death in combat in France during World War I. At the time of her death, she lived at 36 East 72nd Street.

After a brief illness, de Rham died at New York Hospital on December 24, 1965.
