= Charles de Rham =

American merchant and clubman

Charles de Rham (October 22, 1822 – February 23, 1909) was an American merchant and clubman who was prominent in New York society.

== Early life ==
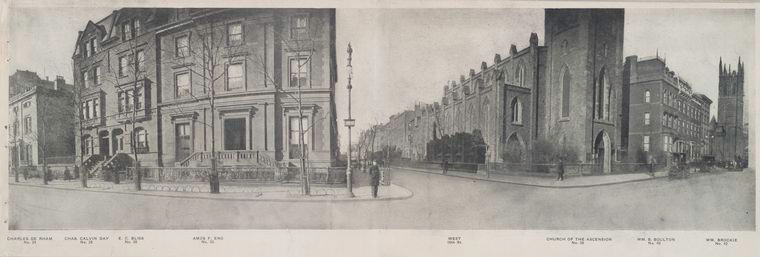
24 Fifth Avenue, de Rham's home from 1849 until his death in 1909.

Charles was born in New York City on October 22, 1822. He was one of four children born to Henry Casimir de Rham (1785–1873) and Maria Theresa (née Moore) de Rham (1784–1855). His father, who came to America in 1805, was a merchant and diplomat who was appointed one of the first two Swiss consuls to the U.S. in 1822.

His paternal grandparents were Johann Christoph Wilhelm de Rham and the former Anne (née Kinloch) de Rham (a daughter of Sir James Kinloch, Bt. of Scotland). His maternal grandparents were Jane (née Fish) Moore and the well-known surgeon, Dr. William Moore (a brother of Bishop Benjamin Moore). His was a first cousin of writer and real estate developer Clement Clarke Moore.

== Career ==
Charles became a partner in his father's firm, De Rham, Iselin & Moore, which was absorbed in 1881 by the firm of Adrian Iselin & Co., however, "at no time in his life did he actively engage" in business. He was a director of the Gebhard Fire Insurance Company.

According to his obituary, "he was of a retiring disposition, and at no time took an active part in public affairs, although he was one of the founders of the Knickerbocker, and had been a member of the Union Club.

== Personal life ==
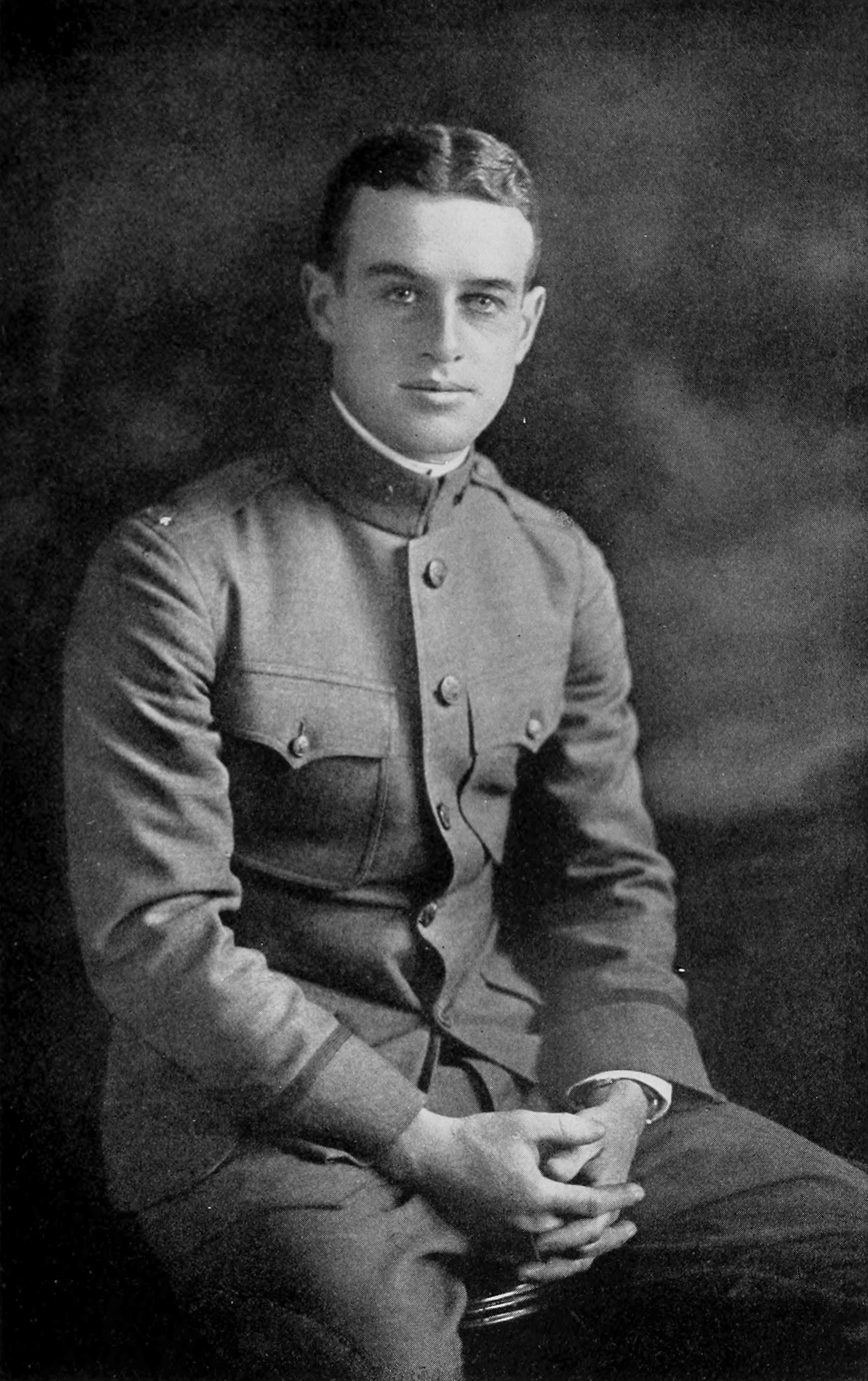
Photograph of his grandson, Charles de Rham III, who died in France during World War I

On May 30, 1849, de Rham was married to Laura Friedrich Schmidt at Grace Church. Laura was a daughter of Eliza Ann (née Bache) Schmidt and John William Schmidt, who served more than fifty years as Consul-General in New York for Prussia, Saxony, and Baden. Her paternal grandfather, Dr. Georg Schmidt, was court physician to Queen Louise of Prussia, and her maternal grandfather, William Bache, was a son of Theophylact Bache. The de Rhams had a country home at Cold Spring, New York, known as Giez (after the town of his father's birth in Switzerland), and would often stay in Newport, Rhode Island. Together, they were the parents of:

- Elise De Rham (1850–1879), who married John Jay Pierrepont, a grandson of Hezekiah Pierrepont and Peter A. Jay (eldest son of Founding Father John Jay), in 1876.
- Charles de Rham Jr. (1854–1933), who married Emily Hone Foster, a sister of Frederic de Peyster Foster and Giraud Foster, in 1880.
- Henry Casimir de Rham (1855–1916), who married Anna Tayloe Warren, a daughter of George Bowers Warren, in 1885. After her death in 1892, he married socialite Georgina Louise Berryman, a daughter of Charles Henry Berryman and Harriett (née Whitney) Berryman and sister to Caroline Berryman Spencer, in 1895.
- William de Rham (1857–1881), who died unmarried at Pau, France.

His wife died in May 1899. After a short illness, de Rham died of pneumonia at his home, 24 Fifth Avenue (a large brownstone house at the northeast corner of Fifth Avenue and 9th Street where he had lived since 1849), on February 23, 1909. After a funeral at Grace Church, he was buried at Green-Wood Cemetery in Brooklyn.

=== Descendants ===
Through his son Charles, he was a grandfather of Henry Casimir de Rham (1882–1947) (who married Frances Appleton Dana, a daughter of Richard Henry Dana III and granddaughter of Henry Wadsworth Longfellow); Frederic Foster de Rham (1883–1938); Laura de Rham (1887–1906); Charles de Rham (1888–1918) (who married Jeanne King); and Emily Clarisse de Rham (1902–1973) (wife of John Rutherfurd, a descendant of U.S. Senator John Rutherfurd).

Through his son Henry, he was a grandfather of Casimir de Rham (1896–1968), who married Lucy Lathrop Patterson (a daughter of Rufus L. Patterson Jr.); William de Rham (1901–1957); Marion Elise de Rham (1903–1991), who married Frederick Simonds Whitlock; and Cmdr. Stephen Whitney de Rham (1905–1961).
