= East Side House Settlement =

- Founded: 1891
- Type: Nonprofit organization
- Purpose: Education and Workforce Development
- Headquarters: 337 Alexander Avenue, Bronx, New York, 10454
- Location: Bronx, New York City, New York
- Executive Director: Daniel Diaz
- Employees: 600
- Website: www.eastsidehouse.org

East Side House Settlement is a non-profit organization located in the Mott Haven section of the South Bronx area of New York, New York, United States. It has served the Mott Haven section of the Bronx since 1963, and in 2015 has a staff of over 400, with an emphasis on programs serving children, families, and community development.

== Mission ==
East Side House believes that education is the key that enables all people to create economic and civic opportunities for themselves, their families, and their community. Their focus is on critical developmental periods – early childhood and adolescence – and critical junctures – points at which people are determined to become economically independent.

They enrich, supplement and enhance the public school system and place college within reach of motivated students. They provide services to families in order that other family members may pursue their educational goals. They provide technology and career readiness training to enable students to improve their economic status and lead more fulfilling lives.

== History ==
East Side House Settlement – one of New York City's oldest non-profit social services organizations – was established in 1891 on the Upper East Side of Manhattan. In 1962-63 it moved to the Mott Haven neighborhood of the South Bronx, within one of the country's poorest congressional districts.

Still headquartered in the South Bronx, East Side House has expanded its reach to serve residents of surrounding communities in the Bronx and Northern Manhattan. Today, a staff of more than 400 full and part-time teachers, social workers, and other experts serve 8,000 individuals from 18 program locations annually, with a budget in excess of $11 million – a significant percentage of which comes from private philanthropy.

Throughout its history, East Side House's mission has been to help improve lives and enrich the quality of life in the community.

== Programs ==
- Early Childhood
- Elementary School
- Middle School
- High School
- Young Adult Education/HSE
- Post-Secondary Pathways
- Jobs-Plus
- Senior Citizens
- Social Services
- Community Technology
- Literacy Development

== Sites ==
Administration

- 337 Alexander Avenue: Young Adult Education Services (YAES)/Social Services

High Schools

- Alfred E. Smith Career and Technical Education High School Campus: Bronx Design and Construction Academy, Bronx Haven High School, and Smith Campus Young Adult Borough Center (YABC)
- Arturo A. Schomburg Satellite Academy
- Samuel Gompers High School: Mott Haven Community High School
- Herbert H. Lehman High School
- Health Opportunities High School
- High School for Excellence and Innovation (Inwood, Manhattan)
- Mott Haven Educational Campus
- Bronx Regional High School
- George Washington Educational Campus (YABC) (Inwood, Manhattan)

Middle Schools

- Accion Academy
- MS 337 - The School for Inquiry and Social Justice
- MS 371 - Urban Institute of Mathematics
- MS 467 - Mott Hall Community School
- PS 18: Park Terrace (Inwood, Manhattan)

Elementary Schools

- PS 30
- PS 179
- PS 212
- Urban Scholars Community School

Head Start Program & Daycare Centers

- Children's Pride (Patterson Houses, NYCHA)
- Mill Brook Community Center (Millbrook Houses, NYCHA)"
- Mott Haven Community Center (Mott Haven Houses, NYCHA)
- Pamela C. Torres Community Center (Millbrook Houses, NYCHA)
- Winifred Wheeler Nursery (Millbrook Houses, NYCHA)"

Community Centers

- Mill Brook Community Center (Millbrook Houses, NYCHA)"
- Mitchel Community Center (Mitchel Houses, NYCHA)
- Mill Brook Community Center (Millbrook Houses, NYCHA)"
- Patterson Community Center (Patterson Houses, NYCHA)

Senior Citizen Centers

- Melrose Senior Center (Melrose Houses, NYCHA)
- Mitchel Senior Center (Mitchel Houses, NYCHA)
- Patterson Senior Center (Patterson Houses, NYCHA)

== Recognition ==
East Side House received four stars out of a four star rating, an overall rating of 98.92 out of 100, for 8 consecutive years as evaluated by Charity Navigator.
