= Michael F. Walsh =

American politician

Justice of the New York State Supreme Court
- In office 1943–1954

Secretary of State of New York
- In office 1939–1943

United States Attorney for the Eastern District of New York
- In office 1938–1939

Personal details
- Born: February 24, 1894 Brooklyn, New York, U.S.
- Died: July 22, 1956 (aged 62) Brooklyn, New York, U.S.

Michael F. Walsh (February 24, 1894 – July 22, 1956) was an American lawyer and Democratic politician. His father, Patrick, who emigrated from Ballydine House near Cashel in Ireland's County Tipperary, was the first person to serve simultaneously as the Chief and Fire Commissioner of the New York City Fire Department.

== Life ==
Michael Walsh was born in Brooklyn, New York, and served in the U.S. Navy during World War I. A graduate of the Law School of Columbia University, he was United States Attorney for the Eastern District of New York from 1938 to 1939 before becoming Secretary of State of New York from 1939 to 1943. He served as a justice of the New York State Supreme Court from 1943 to 1954. For a considerable period, he was a part-time Lecturer at Columbia Law.

He died at his home at 1193 East Nineteenth Street in Brooklyn.

== Sources ==
- Political Graveyard

Legal offices
Preceded by Harold St. Leo O'Dougherty; Acting	U.S. Attorney for the Eastern District of New York; 1938–1939	Succeeded by Vine H. Smith; Acting
Political offices
Preceded by Edward J. Flynn	Secretary of State of New York; 1939–1943	Succeeded by Thomas J. Curran
