= St. Luke's Church (Bronx) =

Church building in New York City

Coordinates: 40°48′22″N 73°54′55″W

The Church of St. Luke
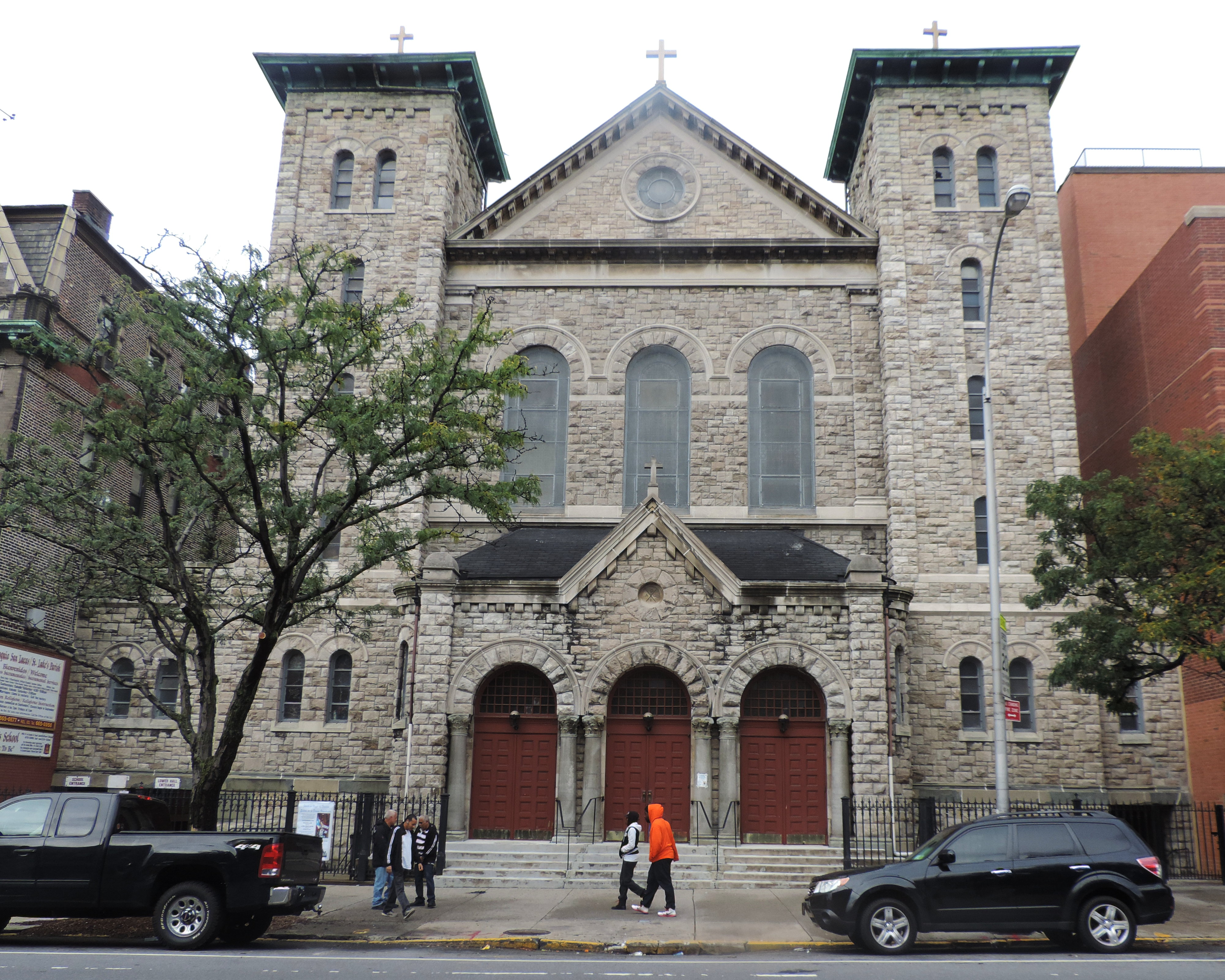
- Interactive map of the The Church of St. Luke area

General information
- Location: The Bronx, New York City, United States
- Construction started: 1897 (for stone basement of church)
- Completed: 1898 (for stone basement of church); 1909 (for school)
- Cost: $45,000 (for 1898 stone basement of church) $80,000 (for 1909 school)
- Client: Roman Catholic Archdiocese of New York

Technical details
- Structural system: Masonry stone (for 1898 basement church); Masonry pressed brick (for 1900s rectory); Masonry brick with stone trimmings (for 1909 school)

The Church of St. Luke is a Roman Catholic parish church under the authority of the Roman Catholic Archdiocese of New York, located at 623 East 138th Street, The Bronx, New York City.

== Parish history ==
The parish was established in 1897 with a Catholic population of around 200, separated from the parish of St. Jerome’s Church (Bronx, New York). The first mass was celebrated by the Rev. John J. Boyle on July 4, 1897, in a barn belonging to the Sadlier family.

== Buildings ==
Archbishop Corrigan dedicated a temporary church February 27, 1898. “The stone basement church was completed at a cost of $45,000, including the lot. Father Boyle next built a rectory of pressed brick, and then devoted his efforts to providing a school.

The school building was opened in 1909, having cost $80,000. It is of brick with stone trimmings.” The school was staffed by the Dominican Sisters of Blauvelt, who originally lived on the third floor of the school.

== Pastors ==
- Rev. John Boyle (1897-1914),
- Very Rev. Msgr. Daniel J. McMackin, D.D., Ph.D. (1916-1922),
- Rt. Rev. John J. Mitty, D.D. (1922-1926),
- Rev. Patrick J. Minogue (1926-1931),
- Rt. Rev. Msgr. Robert B. Mulcahey, DD (1931-1966), Rev. Miguel Juan, T.O.R. 1960
- Rev. Msgr. Gerald J. Ryan (1966-2013)
