= Henry Evelyn Pierrepont =

American merchant (1845–1911)

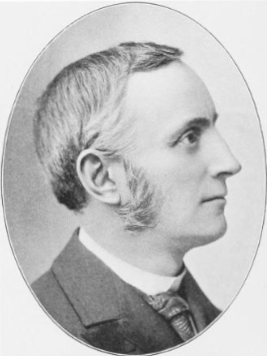
- Born: December 9, 1845; Brooklyn, New York, US
- Died: November 4, 1911 (aged 65); Brooklyn, New York, US
- Burial place: Green-Wood Cemetery
- Occupations: Businessman, merchant
- Spouse: Ellen Almira Low (m. 1869; died 1884)

Henry Evelyn Pierrepont II (December 9, 1845 – November 4, 1911) was a Brooklyn businessman and merchant.

== Early life ==
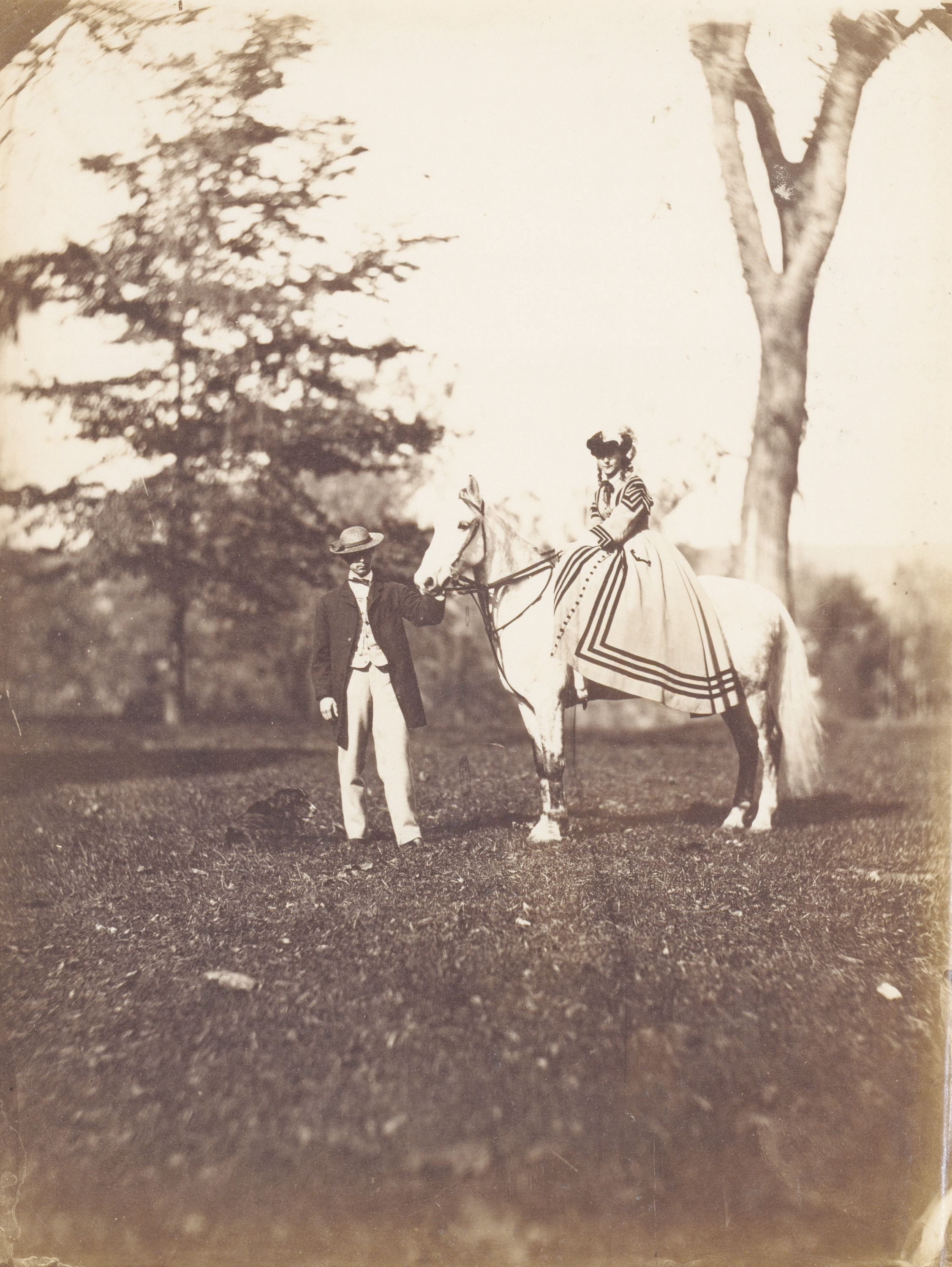
Photograph of his sister, Mary Pierrepont, and her husband, Rutherfurd Stuyvesant, c. 1863

Pierrepont was born on December 9, 1845, in Brooklyn, New York into a prominent Brooklyn family. He was the eldest son of Anna Maria (née Jay) Pierrepont (1819–1902), and Henry Evelyn Pierrepont (1808–1888), who laid out Green-Wood Cemetery. His younger brother was John Jay Pierrepont, and his sister, Mary Pierrepont, married Rutherfurd Stuyvesant. His father, together with Jacob R. Leroy organized Union Ferry Company.

His paternal grandparents were the merchant, farmer, landowner and land developer Hezekiah Pierrepont and Anna Maria Constable (a daughter of Anna White and William Constable of Philadelphia). His maternal grandparents were Peter Augustus Jay (eldest son of Gov. John Jay) and Mary Rutherford Clarkson (a daughter of General Matthew Clarkson).

Pierrepont studied at Columbia College, receiving his Bachelor of Arts degree in 1867.

== Career ==
He was a member of the firm of Pierrepont Brothers & Co., serving as the sole manager of the Pierrepont stores for 25 years. Following his father's retirement, Henry and his younger brother John took over Pierrepont Stores, the family import-export and warehouse business. Following the death of their father in 1888, the company was leased to the Empire Warehouse Company. In 1895, the brothers sold Pierrepont Stores to Brooklyn Wharf and Warehouse Company.

He served as a trustee of the Home Life Insurance Company, the Fidelity and Casualty Company, the Franklin Trust Company, the Brooklyn Savings Bank, the Brooklyn Hospital, and the City Dispensary, and a member of the Hamilton Club.

He was one of the most "prominent Protestant Episcopal laymen" in New York and served as a Warden of Grace Church in Brooklyn Heights.

== Personal life ==
In 1869, he married Ellen Almira Low (1846–1884), a daughter of merchant Abiel Abbot Low and sister to Abbot Augustus Low, and New York Mayor Seth Low. Before her death in 1884, they were the parents of six children:

- Anne Low Pierrepont (1870–1948), who married Lea McIlvaine Luquer, a professor of mineralogy at Columbia University.
- Ellen Low Pierrepont (1872–1960), who married Reuben Burnham Moffat in 1895.
- Henry Evelyn Pierrepont III (1873–1903), who died unmarried.
- Robert Low Pierrepont (1876–1945), who married Kathryn Isabel Reed, a daughter of Josiah Reed and niece of Mrs. Samuel Bowne Duryea, in 1900.
- Rutherfurd Stuyvesant Pierrepont (1882–1950), who married Nathalie Leon de Castro, a great-granddaughter of William Cullen Bryant, in 1911.
- Seth Low Pierrepont (1884–1956), who married Nathalie Elizabeth Chauncey, a daughter of Elihu Chauncey and Mary Jane (née Potter) Chauncey (a daughter of Bishop Horatio Potter).

Pierrepont died at his home, 216 Columbia Heights, Brooklyn, on November 4, 1911. He was buried at Green-Wood Cemetery.

=== Descendants ===
Through his eldest daughter Anne, he was a grandfather of Lea Shippen Luquer, Evelyn Pierrepont Luquer, and Thatcher Payne Luquer.

Through his daughter Ellen, he was a grandfather of Elizabeth Barclay Moffat, who married Ambassador John Campbell White (a nephew of Rutherfurd Stuyvesant); Jay Pierrepont Moffat, the U.S. Ambassador to Canada; and Abbot Low Moffat, a member of the New York State Assembly.

Through his son Rutherfurd, who went by his middle name Stuyvesant, he was a grandfather of Mary Rutherfurd Pierrepont, who married Fentress Hill Kuhn; R. Stuyvesant Pierrepont Jr., who married Ford Agency model Mary Owings "Molly" Shriver, a daughter of Joseph Nicholas Shriver of Baltimore; and John Pierrepont.

Through his son Robert, he was a grandfather of naval officer John Jay Pierrepont II.
