= Billy McCormack =

Billy McCormack may refer to:

- Billy McCormack (Louisiana pastor) (1928–2012), American Southern Baptist clergyman

== Fictional characters ==
- Billy McCormack, in the UK TV sitcom Two Pints of Lager and a Packet of Crisps, played by Freddie Hogan

== See also ==
- William McCormack (disambiguation)
