= William Jerome McCormack =

American Roman Catholic bishop

His Excellency, The Most Reverend William Jerome McCormack
- Auxiliary Bishop of New York
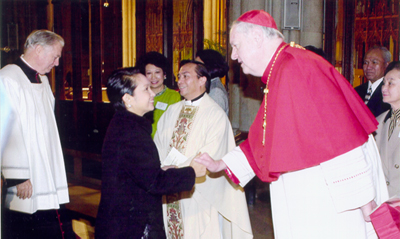
- Bishop McCormack with Philippines President Gloria Macapagal Arroyo in 2001
- Church: Catholic Church
- See: Titular See of Nicives
- In office: 1986 - 2013
- Predecessor: José Mário Stroeher
- Successor: Vacant
- Previous post: Prelate

Orders
- Ordination: February 21, 1959
- Consecration: January 6, 1987 by Pope John Paul II

Personal details
- Born: January 24, 1924 New York City, New York
- Died: November 23, 2013 (aged 89) New York City, New York

William Jerome McCormack (January 24, 1924 – November 23, 2013) was an American prelate of the Catholic Church who served as auxiliary bishop of the Archdiocese of New York from 1987 to 2001.

== Biography ==
=== Early life ===
William Jerome McCormack was born in New York City on January 23, 1924, the son of William J. McCormack and Irene Curry McCormack. Raised on the Upper West Side of Manhattan, Williams attended several private schools. After spending one year at Williams College in Williamstown, Massachusetts, he left college to join the U.S. Coast Guard. During World War II, McCormack spent four years serving on a ship patrolling the North Atlantic.

After his discharge from the Coast Guard in 1945, McCormack started working for the Transit-Mix Concrete Corporation, a large provider of concrete in New York City that was run by his father.

In 1954, Williams entered St. Bonaventure University in St. Bonaventure, New York, to complete his Bachelor of Arts degree. Having decided to become a priest, he then began studying at Christ the King Seminary in East Aurora, New York.

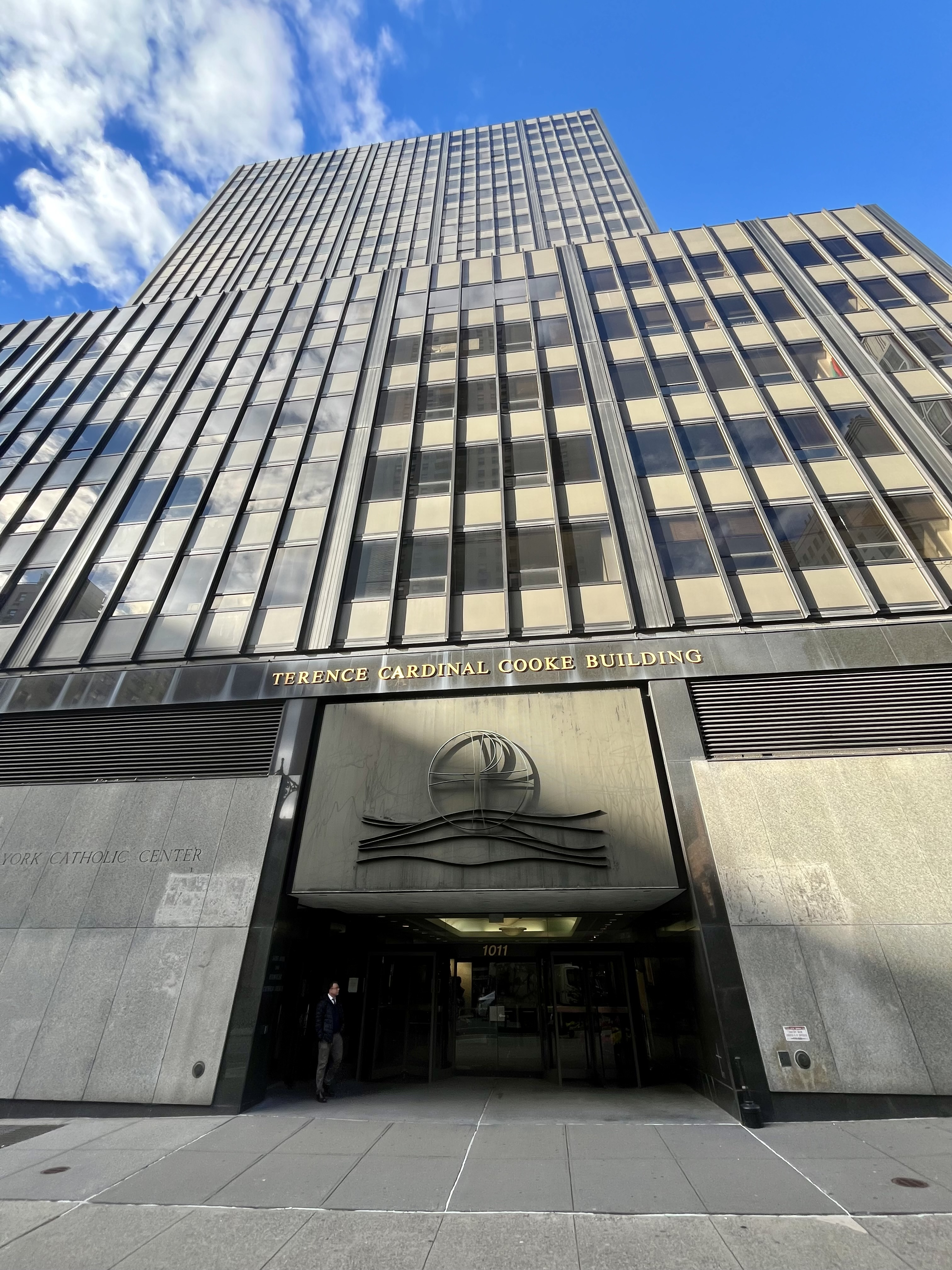
Terence Cardinal Cooke Building, Manhattan (2023)

=== Priesthood ===
McCormack was ordained a priest for the Archdiocese of New York on February 21, 1959, at St. Joseph's Cathedral in Buffalo, New York, by Bishop Joseph A. Burke. The archdiocese assigned McCormack as parochial vicar at St. Mary Star of the Sea Parish in the Bronx.

In 1961, McCormack left St. Mary to become assistant director of the archdiocesan office of the Society for the Propagation of the Faith (the Society). Three years later, he was named director of that office. In 1968, McCormack was also named director of the archdiocesan Office of World Justice and Peace.

Cardinal Terence Cooke named McCormack in 1970 as vice chancellor of the archdiocese and chair of the Building Commission. While running the Building Commission, McCormack constructed the Terence Cardinal Cooke Building in Manhattan, which housed the archdiocesan offices. He also constructed Cathedral High School for girls in Manhattan and St. John the Evangelist Church in Manhattan. In 1980, McCormack left his archdiocesan jobs to serve as national director of the Society.

=== Auxiliary Bishop of New York ===
McCormack was appointed auxiliary bishop of New York and titular bishop of Nicives on December 23, 1986 by Pope John Paul II. He was consecrated by the pope at St. Peter's Basilica in Rome on January 6, 1987. He was allowed to remain national director of the Society.

=== Death ===
McCormack retired as auxiliary bishop of New York on October 30, 2001. He also resigned as national director of the Society for the Propagation of the Faith. He died at the Mary Manning Walsh Home in Manhattan on November 23, 2013.

Catholic Church titles
Preceded by –	Auxiliary Bishop of New York; 1987–2001	Succeeded by –
