= William J. McCormack (businessman) =

American businessman

- At the Transit Mix East River Cement Factory with Stuyvesant Town–Peter Cooper Village in background
- Born: November 10, 1887; Jersey City, New Jersey, U.S.
- Died: July 12, 1965 (aged 77); Greenwich, Connecticut, U.S.
- Spouse: Irene Agatha Curry (m. 1919; died 1965)
- Children: 2, including William Jerome McCormack

William J. McCormack (November 10, 1887 – July 12, 1965) was a successful New York City businessman of the first half of the twentieth century. McCormack was born in Jersey City, New Jersey to Great Famine immigrants from County Monaghan, Ireland. McCormack began life as a grocer's wagon-boy running errands along New York's West Side docks and went on to establish Penn Stevedoring, one of the most important produce handlers in the United States.

By the mid-1930s, Penn held a virtual monopoly on the stevedoring of all the perishable food shipped to the City of New York via the Pennsylvania Railroad. For almost thirty years McCormack was known as "Big Bill McCormack," or simply as the mysterious "Mr. Big" of the New York waterfront. In the early 1950s, details of McCormack's relationships with International Longshoreman's Association President Joseph P. Ryan and various organized crime figures were revealed in a series of New York Sun articles by Malcolm Johnson entitled "Crime on the Waterfront." These articles, and the 1953 Waterfront Crime Commission hearings that followed, provided Elia Kazan with the factual background for his classic 1954 film On The Waterfront.

== Businessman ==
=== U.S. Trucking Company ===
Bill McCormack and his brother Harry first became known in the Port of New York as owners of a small trucking business around the time of the First World War. They were also stout pillars in the New Jersey political organization of Frank "I am the law" Hague, for whom they got out the vote. The McCormack brothers, like so many children of famine immigrants who started out in deep poverty, were esteemed as fearless street brawlers. Bill McCormack was also shrewd. In 1920, he banded together with several other truckers and formed the U.S. Trucking Corporation, installing himself as executive vice president in charge of labor relations. The key to McCormack's success was his ability to cultivate powerful political connections. Along with Boss Hague, McCormack was close to Alfred E. Smith. In 1920, Governor Smith was defeated in his campaign for reelection. McCormack and his business associates made Smith the president, or front man, of their U.S. Trucking Corporation.

=== Chairman of the Licensing Committee of the State Athletic Commission ===
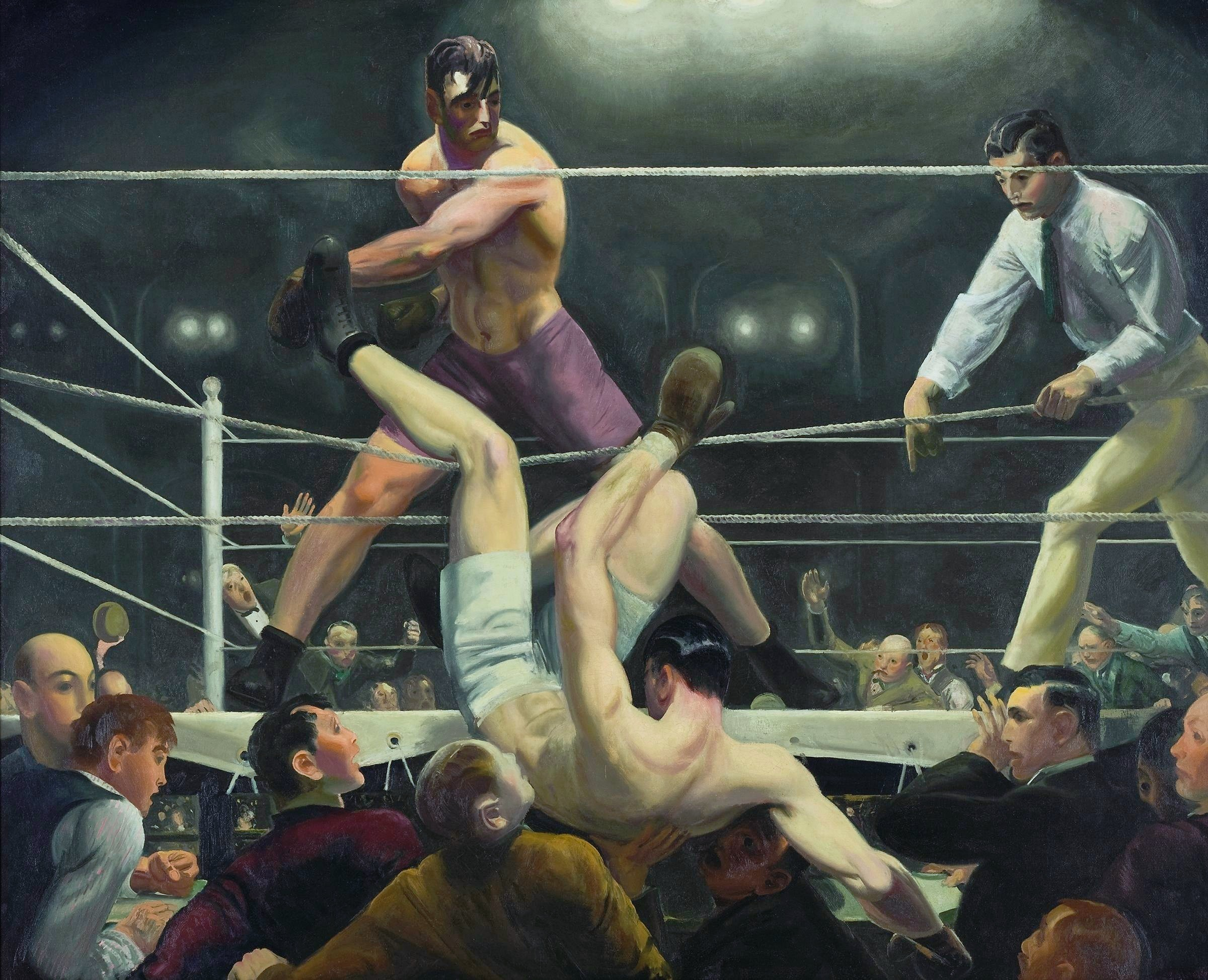
Firpo sending Dempsey outside the ring; painting by George Bellows

When Smith was reelected governor, he paid Bill McCormack back by appointing him chairman of the New York State Boxing Commission. At the time, the Committee ran boxing in New York and the commissionership was a powerful appointment coveted by Tammany Hall associates. And McCormack may have abused that power, because on January 30, 1924, not long after his appointment, McCormack resigned under mysterious circumstances. Speculation was that Governor Smith had forced McCormack out when allegations surfaced that McCormack had extorted $81,500 from promoters before he would grant a license for the Jack Dempsey – Luis Firpo fight in New York City. In 1953, under oath, McCormack dismissed the charge as an "alcoholic's dream." Although McCormack was never formally charged, the alleged extortion was one of the many questionable practices that would plague the athletic commissions and the boxing profession.

=== United Sand and Gravel (Transit-Mix) ===
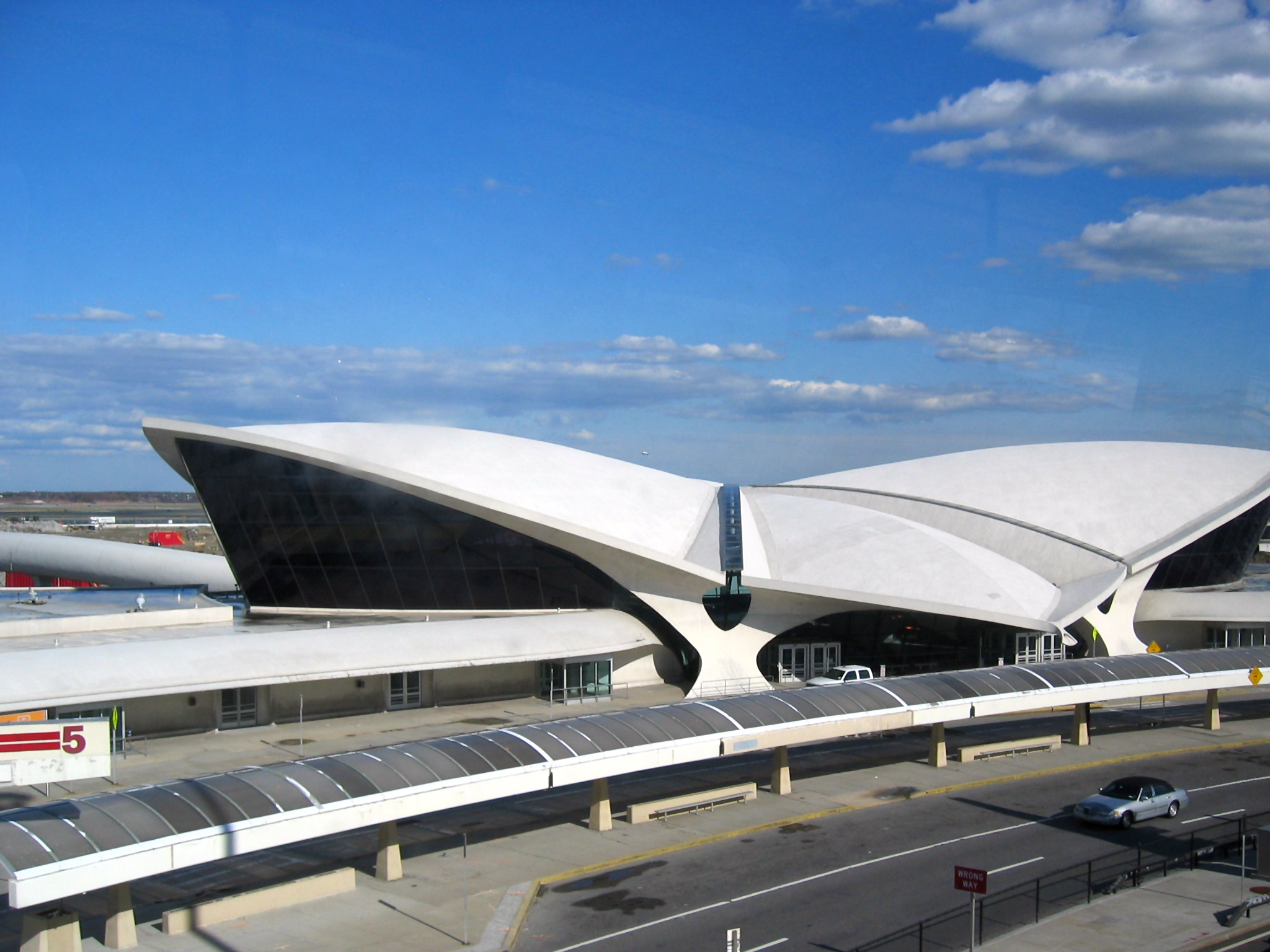
TWA Flight Center

In 1927, McCormack sold his interest in U.S. Trucking and entered the sand and gravel business by obtaining an interest in United Sand and Gravel, a company owned by former Assistant District Attorney Edward J. Chapman and McCormack's cousin and close friend Bronx politician Robert L. Moran. United Sand and Gravel became Transit-Mix, which, as one of only two concrete plants located within the city, provided millions of cubic feet of concrete for public and private construction projects including the Empire State Building, Chrystler Building, United Nations, Radio City, Waldorf-Astoria, New York Central Building, Guggenheim Museum, Lincoln Center, 1964 World's Fair Grounds in Flushing, Cross Bronx Expressway, Major Deegan Expressway, Long Island Expressway, TWA Flight Center at JFK Airport designed by Eero Saarinen, the Whitestone, Throgs Neck and Verrazzano–Narrows bridges and the World Trade Center. After McCormack's death, Transit-Mix was left to McCormack's daughter, who sold the corporation to Edward J. Halloran, owner of the Halloran House hotel on Lexington Avenue at 49th Street. In 1986 Halloran and Transit-Mix were indicted, along with Anthony Salerno and other members of the Genovese Crime Family, for bid rigging, extortion, gambling and murder conspiracies. Halloran disappeared under mysterious circumstances in 1998 and remains missing to this day.

=== Other business ventures ===
McCormack was partners with Sam Rosoff in a number of contracting and bus ventures, including the Fifth Avenue Bus Company. "Subway Sam," as Rosoff was known, arrived in New York from Russia by himself and sold newspapers under the Brooklyn Bridge before becoming a construction millionaire before age 30. The story is told that McCormack and Rosoff got their starts in a creative partnership. Rosoff had a contract to remove all the cinders and ashes from city buildings, including schools, and McCormack had a contract to pave city streets. Rosoff would dump the cinders on an empty lot on the West Side, where McCormack would pick them up and use them to pave the streets.

McCormack also operated New York's biggest chain of independent filling stations, and in 1944 he incorporated and became president of Morania Oil Co., which in 1952 was responsible for $2.25 million of the city's $2.5 million purchases of gas and oil and serviced thousands of cars in its filling stations. Morania also provided transportation for such refiners as Standard Oil, Texaco and Gulf. McCormack owned a contracting company, and much of the sand that went into Transit-Mix concrete was provided by sand and dredging companies owned by McCormack that mined sand from Long Island's North Shore.

=== Penn Stevedoring ===
McCormack's largest enterprise by far, however, was Penn Stevedoring. Founded in 1930, Penn would eventually hold a virtual monopoly on unloading all freight brought into the city via the Pennsylvania Railroad, principally all the fruit and vegetables freighted daily into the metropolis. In effect, McCormack acted as the agent of the Pennsylvania Railroad in New York politics and became something of an expert in labor relations and a major power behind Mayor Impelliteri. On the waterfront, where flash-strikes were common, McCormack's companies were struck only once.

== Crime on the waterfront ==
=== New York Sun Articles and Waterfront Crime Commission ===
McCormack was paternalistic toward his men, was powerful in politics and wielded enormous influence over Joe Ryan, the President of the International Longshoreman's Association. Ryan did the bidding of McCormack and the shipping companies, providing labor peace in exchange for personal financial gain. All the while, the men in Ryan's union suffered low wages and underemployment that made them vulnerable to loan sharking and extortion from the hiring bosses. McCormack, along with Ryan and their underworld associates, pocketed millions of dollars from bribes, protection rackets and stolen merchandise, and their rule went unchallenged for decades because the men of the waterfront held firm to the "Irish code of silence."

In 1949, the New York Sun published "Crime on the Waterfront," a 24-part series of articles written by Malcolm Johnson which detailed the widespread corruption, extortion, and racketeering that existed on the waterfront. The series won the 1949 Pulitzer Prize for Local Reporting and led to the establishment of the 1953 Waterfront Crime Commission. When called before the Commission, McCormack denied any role in the alleged labor racketeering and denied knowing anything about theft, loan-sharking, gambling, union corruption or any other evils associated with the docks. However, McCormack was not a particularly credible witness. During the five years prior to 1953, McCormack and members of his family had made payments to unknown parties totaling almost $1 million, none of which could be accounted for by business receipts or invoices. Moreover, his dock employees, although members of the International Longshoreman's Association, earned fifty cents per hour less than other dockworkers and the conclusion was that these payments had gone to labor racketeers.

"McCormack was also questioned about the previous testimony of the supervisor of employment for the division of parole. This supervisor had testified that although he had never met "Big Bill" McCormack, he had met with McCormack's brother Harry many times. The purpose of these meetings was that on numerous occasions men, who were being released from prison on parole, would have the prison officials put in writing a note that said, "Mr. H.F. McCormack will make immediate arrangements for this inmate's union membership upon his release." It was estimated that over 200 parolees were given "jobs" with McCormack's Penn Stevedoring Company. Some of these jobs may have been legitimate dock work, but most ex-con's employed by McCormack's Penn Stevedoring Company were nothing more than thugs and leg breakers, and sometimes murderers for the union. When "Big Bill" McCormack was asked at the Waterfront Hearings why he had employed so many men with dubious backgrounds, McCormack said, "It's because I take a human view of employee problems. I’m human, and they’re human." Two of the "human" men employed by the McCormack Penn Stevedoring Company, after they were released from jail, were John "Cockeye" Dunn, and Andrew "Squint" Sheridan. Both men where eventually fried in the electric chair, after they were convicted of the murder of hiring stevedore Andy Hintz, while both killers were working for McCormack." After McCormack's testimony, the New York Herald Tribune wrote, "Mr. McCormack's activities on behalf of the longshoreman's union suggest that he has been pulling the strings for Joseph P. Ryan for many years, and may, in fact, be a more powerful figure on the waterfront than the Boss (Ryan) himself."

=== On the Waterfront ===
"Crime on the Waterfront" and the resulting 1953 Waterfront Crime Commission provided Elia Kazan with the factual background for his 1954 film "On The Waterfront." "Mr. Upstairs," the corrupt leader who directs Johnny Friendly from the comfort of his Westchester mansion, is based on the real-life McCormack. Years later, Bud Schulberg, who wrote the screenplay, recalled bringing Kazan to meet with Father John, the real life "Father Barry," played by Karl Malden in the movie.

"That day he was going up in smoke. He was furious that Spellman was giving an award to Bill McCormack—the 'Mr. Big' of the waterfront. Mr. McCormack was a respectable man. He had lots and lots of money. He put Mayor Impellitteri in office. But the people under McCormack were monsters and killers. Anyway, the day I brought Kazan, Father John was yelling, 'I'm going to stop Spellman.' He was cursing—'McCormack, that son of a bitch'—and shouting.".

Mr. Upstairs's face is never shown, and we see only the plush estate (with television set and butler) where he lives. The director's script, housed at Wesleyan Cinema Archives, includes a double page Newsweek report, "Death on the Docks," of May 18, 1953 and, opposite the script section depicting the reaction of "Mr. Upstairs" to Terry Malloy's testimony, an unidentified magazine picture of McCormack.
