= Bill McCormick (Canadian football) =

Profile
- Position: Guard

Personal information
- Born: c. 1928; Hamilton, Ohio
- Listed height: 5 ft 11 in (1.80 m)
- Listed weight: 220 lb (100 kg)

Career information
- College: Miami (OH)

Career history
- 1950: Toronto Argonauts

Awards and highlights
- Grey Cup champion (1950)

William McCormick (born c. 1928) was an American professional football player who played for the Toronto Argonauts. He won the Grey Cup with them in 1950. He played college football at Miami University in Oxford, Ohio. He is a member of the Miami Redhawks Athletics Hall of Fame, inducted in 1982.
