= John Jay Pierrepont =

American business man

John Jay Pierrepont (September 2, 1849 – September 25, 1923) was a Brooklyn businessman, financier, and amateur photographer.

== Early life ==
Pierrepont was born on September 2, 1849, in Rye, New York into a prominent Brooklyn family that helped found Green-Wood Cemetery. He was the second son of Henry Evelyn Pierrepont (1808–1888) and Anna Maria (née Jay) Pierrepont (1819–1902). His elder brother was Henry Evelyn Pierrepont II, and his sister, Mary Pierrepont, married Rutherfurd Stuyvesant. His father, together with Jacob R. Leroy organized Union Ferry Company. Upon her death in 1880, John and his wife jointly inherited $10,000 (equivalent to $326,000 in 2024).

His paternal grandparents were the merchant, farmer, landowner and land developer Hezekiah Pierrepont and Anna Maria Constable (a daughter of Anna White and William Constable of Philadelphia). His maternal grandparents were Peter Augustus Jay (eldest son of Gov. John Jay) and Mary Rutherford Clarkson (a daughter of General Matthew Clarkson).

== Career ==
Pierrepont was educated at the Columbia Grammar School before attending the Brooklyn Polytechnic Institute (the predecessor to the New York University Tandon School of Engineering).

He was a member of the firm of Pierrepont Brothers & Co. Following his father's retirement, John with his elder brother Henry took over Pierrepont Stores, the family import-export and warehouse business. Following the death of their father in 1888, the company was leased to the Empire Warehouse Company. In 1895, the brothers sold Pierrepont Stores to Brooklyn Wharf and Warehouse Company.

From 1869 to 1888, he was the Second Vice President of the South Brooklyn Savings Association (founded in 1850, later renamed Independence Savings Bank, before it was acquired by Santander in 2006). He also served as a director of the All-American Cables Company and the Mexican Telephone Company.

== Personal life ==
Pierrepont was a member of the Brooklyn Institute, the New York Zoological Society, the Audubon Society, the Hamilton Club, the New York Yacht Club, and the Down Town Association. He was also a noted amateur photographer. On October 26, 1876, Pierrepont married Elise de Rham (1850–1879), a daughter of Laura Friedrich (née Schmidt) de Rham and Charles de Rham (the son of Swiss American diplomat Henry Casimir de Rham). Together, they were the parents of one son who died in infancy. Elise died in 1879, and Pierrepont never remarried. He died on September 25, 1923, while aboard a train from Bar Harbor, Maine. He was buried at Green-Wood Cemetery.
