= Hezekiah Pierrepont =

American businessman

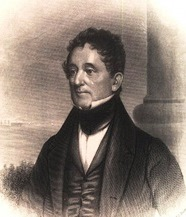
- engraved portrait by John Chester Buttre
- Born: November 3, 1768; New Haven, Connecticut, British America
- Died: August 11, 1838 (aged 69); New York City, U.S.
- Occupations: merchant, adventurer, farmer, landowner, developer
- Known for: Founding Brooklyn Heights, New York
- Spouse: Anna Maria Constable (m. 1802; died 1859)
- Relatives: Eugene P. Bicknell (grandson); Henry Evelyn Pierrepont (grandson); John Jay Pierrepont (grandson)

Hezekiah Beers Pierrepont (November 3, 1768 – August 11, 1838) was a merchant, farmer, landowner and land developer in Brooklyn and New York state. He restored the spelling of the family surname from "Pierpont" to "Pierrepont", its original French spelling.

== Early life and education ==
Pierrepont was born in New Haven, Connecticut in 1768 to a long-established New England family. He was one of ten children, only four of whom survived to adulthood. His parents were John Pierpont and Sarah (née Beers) Pierpont.

His maternal grandparents were Nathan Beers and Hannah (née Nichols) Beers. His paternal grandparents were Lydia (née Hemingway) Pierpont (a daughter of Rev. Jacob Hemingway who married Capt. Theophilus Morgan after his grandfather's death) and Hezekiah Pierpont, a son of the Rev. James Pierpont, a founder of Yale University.

== Career ==
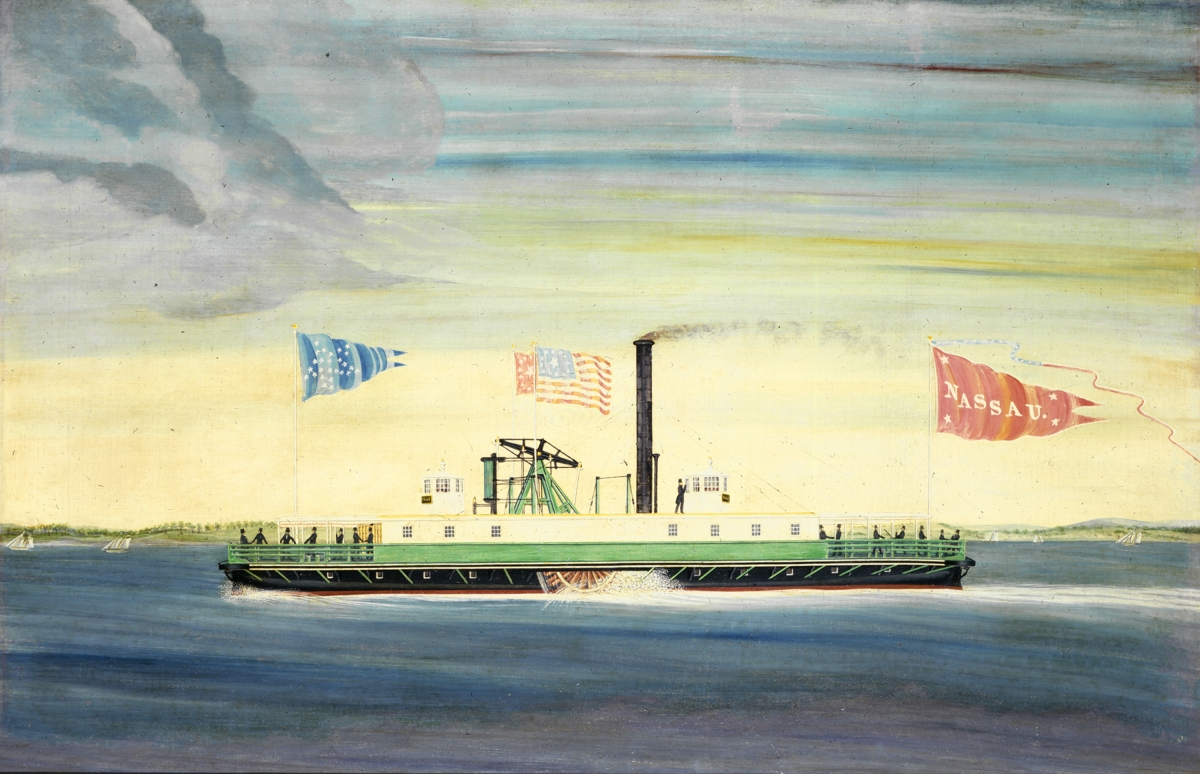
The Nassau, Fulton's first East River ferry

After making some money by speculating on the national debt, in 1793, Pierrepont, then 25 years old, launched a career as a merchant-adventurer. He relocated to Paris and, with his cousin, began to import goods to France, later expanding the company's scope to India and China. However, the business came to an end when his ship, the Confederacy, was captured in the China Sea by privateers in 1797, while he was on board. Having made a small fortune, he was now bankrupt, and returned to the United States. He settled in Brooklyn in 1802.

He bought 60 acres (24 ha) – part of the Livingston estate, plus the Benson, De Bevoise and Remsen farms, – on what was then called "Clover Hill", now Brooklyn Heights, and built a mansion there. Pierrepont purchased and expanded Philip Livingston's gin distillery on the East River at what is now Joralemon Street, where he produced Anchor Gin. Although very popular, competition from other distillers cut into his profits, and he left the business in 1819.

=== Brooklyn Heights ===
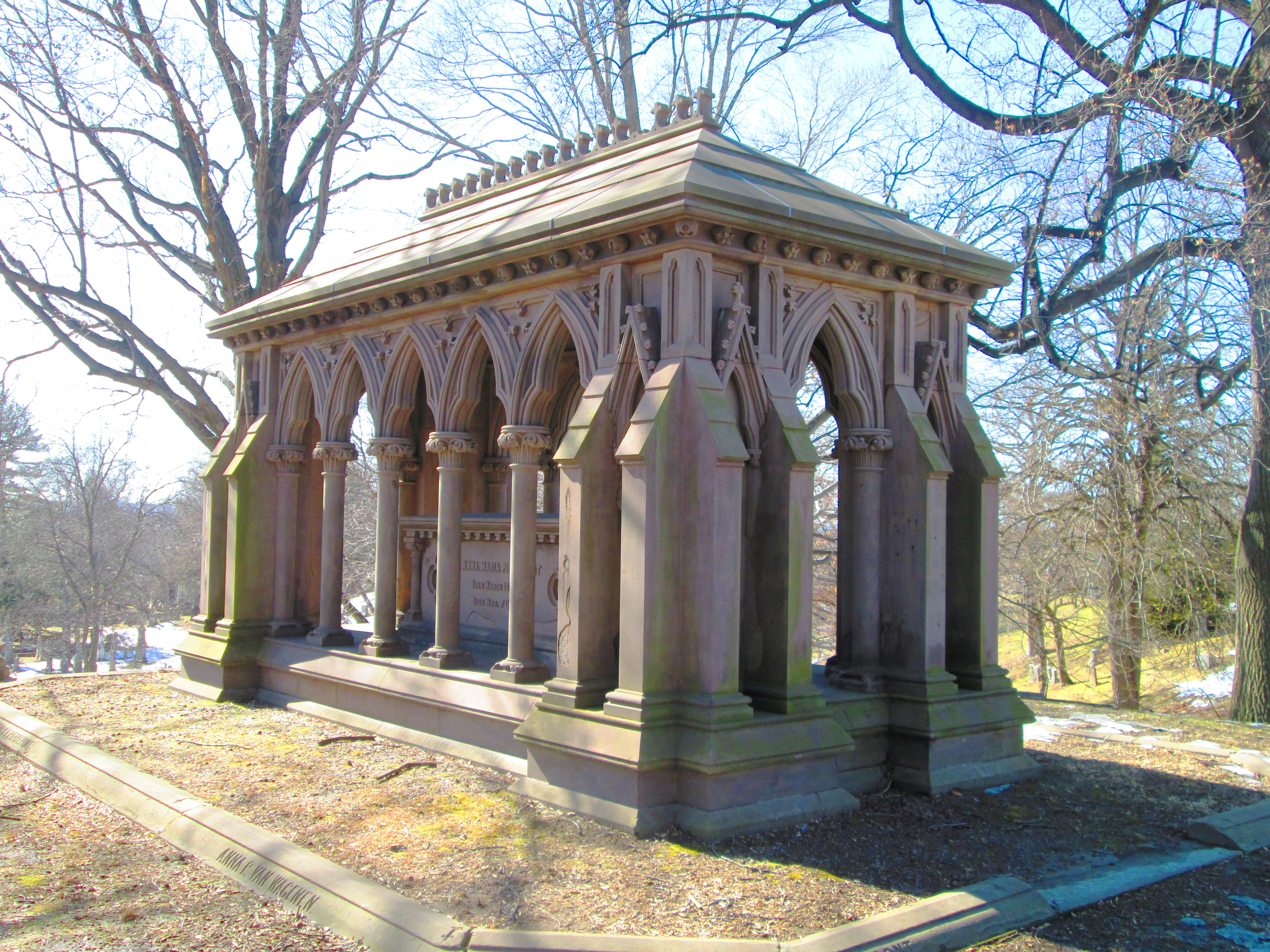
Richard Upjohn's memorial for Pierrepont in Green-Wood Cemetery in Brooklyn

Wishing to subdivide and develop his property, Pierrepont realized the need for regularly scheduled ferry service across the East River, and to this end he became a prominent investor in Robert Fulton's New York and Brooklyn Steam Ferry Boat Company, using his influence on Fulton's behalf. He eventually became a part owner and a director of the company. Fulton's ferry began running in 1814, and Brooklyn received a charter as a village from the New York state in 1816, thanks to the influence of Pierrepont and other prominent landowners.

The city then prepared for the establishment of a street grid, although there were competing plans for the size of the lots. John and Jacob Hicks, who also owned property in Brooklyn Heights, north of Pierrepont's, favored smaller lots, as they were pitching their land to tradesman and artisans already living in Brooklyn, not attempting to lure merchants and bankers from Manhattan as Pierrepont was. To counter the Hickses' proposal, Pierrepont hired a surveyor and submitted an alternative. The Hickses' plan was adopted north of Clark Street, and Pierrepont's, featuring 25 by 100 foot (8 by 30 meter) lots, south of it.

Along with streets came sidewalks, water pumps, and the institution of a watch. By 1823, Pierrepoint was advertising and selling lots to New York City merchant and bankers, lauding the ease of transportation by ferry as opposed to by land from Upper Manhattan, and the special and select quality of the neighborhood. Brooklyn Heights soon became the "first commuter suburb", and Pierrepont the "first important suburban developer".

In 1834, when Brooklyn began to consider building a grand City Hall to rival the one across the East River in Manhattan, Pierrepont and his son, Henry E. Pierrepont, who had studied cities in Europe, decided to develop some of their unused open land behind Brooklyn Heights on the model of European cities. Wishing to have the new City Hall located there as an anchor, since the land was almost a mile away from the waterfront where commercial interests were concentrated, they and Henry Remsen sold the City of Brooklyn a triangular plot at the intersection of Fulton, Joralemon and Court Streets, as the site on which City Hall was built, and the cornerstone for what is now Brooklyn Borough Hall was laid there in 1836.

== Personal life ==
On January 21, 1802, Pierrepont was married to Anna Marie Constable (1783–1859) by Bishop Provost. Anna came from a prominent New York City merchant and landowning family. As a wedding present from her father, William Constable, a partner of Alexander Macomb, received a half a million acres of land, becoming a major property owner in Upstate New York; the town of Pierrepont, New York is named after him. Together, they were the parents of:

- William Constable Pierrepont (1803–1885), who married Cornelia Ann Butler, a daughter of Dr. Benjamin Butler, in 1830.
- Anna Constable Pierrepont (1805–1839), who married Gerrit Gansevoort Van Wagenen.
- Henry Evelyn Pierrepont (1808–1888), who married Anna Maria Jay, a daughter of Peter Augustus Jay and granddaughter of Founding Father John Jay.
- Emily Constable Pierrepont (1810–1881), who married Joseph Alfred Perry.
- Frances Matilda Pierrepont (1812–1892), who married the Rev. Frederick Slocum Wiley.
- Harriet Constable Pierrepont (1820–1855), who married Edgar John Bartow.
- Maria Theresa Pierrepont (1823–1874), who married Joseph Inglis Bicknell.
- Julia Evelyn Pierrepont (1825–1898), who married John Constable.
- Ellen Josephine Pierrepont (1828–1879), who married James Monroe Minor.

Pierrepont died in 1838 in Brooklyn. Hezekiah and his wife Anna are memorialized in the Pierrepont Family Memorial, a Gothic Revival pavilion designed by Richard Upjohn.

=== Descendants ===
Through his daughter Maria, he was a grandfather of the botanist and ornithologist Eugene P. Bicknell.

Through his son Henry, he was a grandfather of Mary Pierrepont, the first wife of Rutherfurd Stuyvesant, Henry Evelyn Pierrepont II (who married Ellen Almira Low, daughter of Abiel Abbot Low and sister of Mayor Seth Low), John Jay Pierrepont, and Julia Jay Pierrepont.
