= DeRham Farm =

Historic house in New York, United States

- U.S. National Register of Historic Places
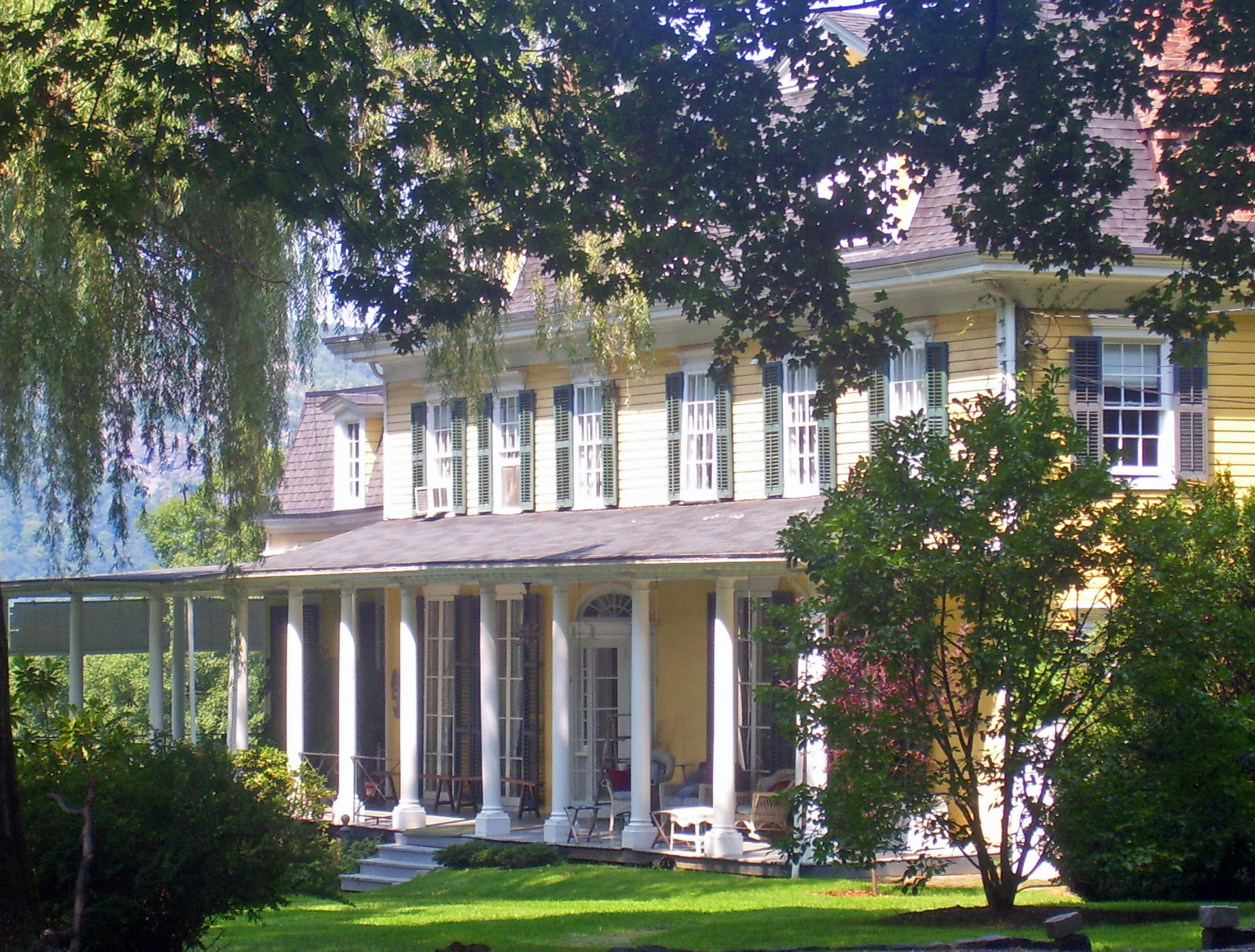
- Main house south elevation and east profile, 2008
- Location: Garrison, NY
- Coordinates: 41°24′18″N 73°56′09″W
- Area: 19.4 acres (7.9 ha)
- Built: early 1800s
- Architectural style: Federal, Greek Revival
- NRHP reference No.: 80002750
- Added to NRHP: March 28, 1980

The former DeRham Farm is located along Indian Brook Road just off NY 9D in the Town of Philipstown, north of Garrison, New York, United States. It is a complex of buildings assembled by a gentleman farmer in the early 19th century that remain intact today.

It has, since its construction, been split into four contiguous lots on either side of the road totalling almost 20 acres (8.1 ha). In 1980 it was listed on the National Register of Historic Places.

== Properties ==
There are 15 contributing properties, all of them former farm buildings, spread across the four parcels. The main house is located off Indian Brook Road, overlooking the Hudson River and the mountains of the western Hudson Highlands across it. It is a two-and-a-half-story home with a full-length veranda supported by Tuscan columns across the first story on the southern (front) façade. It has a mansard roof with pedimented dormers. A two-story wing, also mansard-roofed, projects from the west.

The main entrance is elaborately decorated with an elliptical fanlight, keystone and pilasters with architrave trim and sidelights. It opens onto a wainscoted central hallway. The rooms have original mantels, two in marble and one carved in Adamesque.

Across the road is a board-and-batten-sided cottage and brick carriage house. The former has a low-pitched gabled roof with scalloped bargeboard trim, and the latter has two pyramidal roofs with cupolas, and round-arched Romanesque windows. East of the cottage is the caretaker's cottage, a T-shaped clapboard-sided with clipped or arched windows in the gable apexes. To the north of these buildings is yet another residence, the orchard house, sitting on a rock ledge with hipped dormers and a central projecting gable with canopy. It is fenestrated with narrow, arched double windows in the dormers and gables.

Several smaller outbuildings are scattered around the property. A playhouse and shed are near the main house, with a wellhouse and garage near the orchard house. East of the caretaker's cottage is one barn, the ruins of another, two greenhouses, a root cellar and a water tower.

== History ==
The land was first farmed by a tenant farmer named Thomas Davenport in the early 18th century, when it was still part of the vast holdings of Frederick Philipse. Most were later confiscated due to the Philipse family's support for the Loyalist cause during the Revolutionary War; however the future de Rham property was not among these as it was owned by the heirs of Philip Philipse, who had died in the late 1760s. Davenport and his family lived in a small frame house, probably on the present property, whose exact site is unknown.

Davenport's grandson William appears to have left the area around 1802 and sold his lease to a family named Wheelock. They bought the property outright from the Philipse heirs in 1827. The deed for this transaction mentions the main house and a few of the other structures, so they were apparently built during their ownership.

Three years later, in 1830, the Wheelocks sold the property for $6,900 ($223,000 in 2009 dollars) to brothers Adolphus and John Watson, who bought out a third partner the following year. The Watsons operated the Highland School in the main house until 1835, the year after they had sold to Henry Casimir de Rham.

=== de Rham years ===
In 1834, the Watsons sold the farm to Henry Casimir de Rham, a Swiss immigrant who had become a successful New York merchant and banker, for $11,000 ($355,000 in 2009 dollars). He owned and operated the farm as a summer and weekend residence, renaming it Giez, after the town of his birth in Switzerland, until his death in 1874 (after which it passed to his son Charles de Rham).

He was responsible for three major renovations to the main house in the 19th century, which added the Greek Revival porch, the enlargement of the east wing and the addition of a west wing and the mansard roofs on the whole house. The orchard house was remodeled and expanded in 1929. The de Rham family continued to own the farm until 1949, when it was subdivided into the current four parcels, one of which the family kept. The following year, the main house's east wing was demolished. There have been no major changes since then.
