= Patterson Houses =

Public housing development in the Bronx, New York

Judge Lester Patterson Houses
- Patterson Houses in 2007

General information
- Architectural style: Modern
- Location: 2625 3rd Avenue; Bronx, NY 10451, United States
- Coordinates: 40.814°N 73.9235°W
- Opened: 1950
- Owner: New York City Housing Authority

Design and construction
- Architecture firm: Morrisania Project Association
- Main contractor: Willcox Construction Co.

The Lester Patterson Houses or Patterson Houses is a public housing development in the Mott Haven neighborhood of the Bronx, New York City. It was named after Bronx assemblyman and judge Lester W. Patterson. It is one of the largest New York City Housing Authority (NYCHA) complexes in the city with fifteen buildings 6 and 13-stories tall and 1,790 apartments. It spans an area of 17.18 acres (6.95 ha), which is located between East 138th and 145th Street and covers two main avenues, Third Avenue and Morris Avenue.

== History ==
Construction on the Patterson Houses began in 1948 and were a part of a large push to build public housing developments in the five boroughs. It was the first low rent development completed in the Bronx since World War II and the first families moved into the development in March 1950 with priority for veterans. It was completed on December 31, 1950 and named after judge Lester Patterson (1893–1947). The development's playground was later completed in 1953, and was used by the adjacent school P.S. 18 during school hours.

Tenants of the development in the 1950s were a diverse mix of people from the South, Caribbean, and Puerto Rico. They introduced each other to their cultures including food and music. Many inter-ethnic marriages resulted from the fusion of cultures.

By the early 1960s, crime in NYCHA developments had risen and the agency added extra detectives to help control crime at 28 developments including Patterson. By the late 1960s, tenants felt that policing was inadequate in the development and an increase in muggings and burglaries due to drugs being found on the site and went on strike by withholding rent from the agency. NYCHA took the tenants to court and the judge sided with the agency citing state law that lack of police presence wasn't a violation that tenants could withhold rent for. This resulted in tenants paying $25,000 in back rent.

In advance of the running of the 2026 New York City Marathon, the route through the Bronx was modified so that it no longer went around a Western Beef supermarket and other businesses on East 140th Street, which has left residents isolated from these stores during the race across Morris Avenue since the marathon route was last adjusted in 2011.

== Notable residents ==
- Dorothy Johnson was the very first Resident to move into Patterson Projects in 1950. Allen Jones, (born 1950), author.
- A.G., rapper of Showbiz and A.G.
- Nathaniel "Tiny" Archibald (born 1948), former NBA player
- Oxiris Barbot, Commissioner of Health of the City of New York
- Iran "The Blade" Barkley (born 1960), boxer
- Angelo Cruz (born 1958), Puerto Rican professional basketball player
- Guy Fisher (born 1947), convicted racketeer and owner of the Apollo Theater
- Percee P (born 1969), rapper
- Barry Rogers (1935–1991), salsa musician and jazz fusion trombonist
- Prince Royce (born 1989), Latin musical artist
- Luis Antonio Ramos (born 1973), actor.

== See also ==
- New York City Housing Authority
- List of New York City Housing Authority properties
