= Edward J. Flynn =

American politician (1891–1953)

Edward Flynn
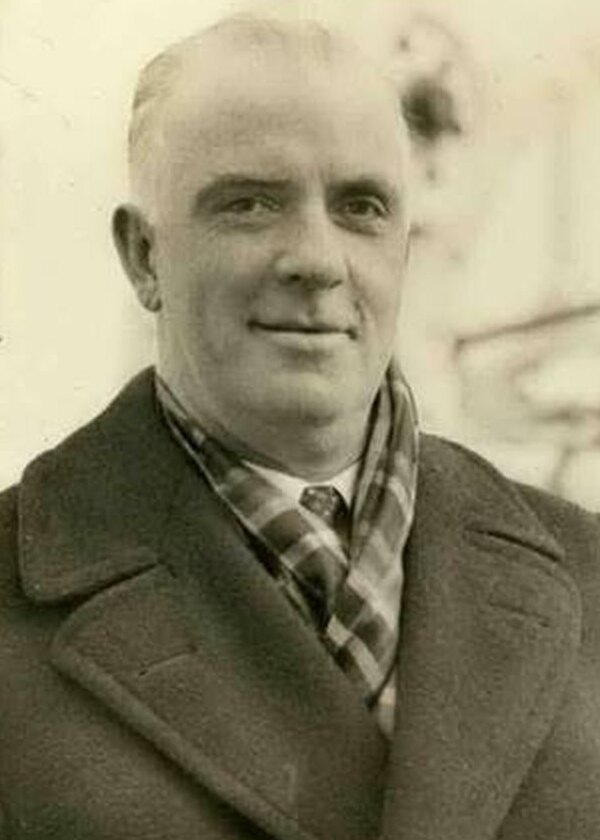
- Flynn in 1932

Chair of the Democratic National Committee
- In office August 17, 1940 – January 18, 1943
- Preceded by: James Farley
- Succeeded by: Frank C. Walker

50th Secretary of State of New York
- In office January 1, 1929 – January 17, 1939
- Governor: Franklin D. Roosevelt; Herbert H. Lehman
- Preceded by: Robert Moses
- Succeeded by: Michael F. Walsh

4th Sheriff of Bronx County, New York
- In office 1922–1925
- Preceded by: Thomas H. O'Neill
- Succeeded by: Lester W. Patterson

Member of the New York State Assembly from Bronx County's 2nd district
- In office January 1, 1918 – December 31, 1921
- Succeeded by: Lester W. Patterson

Personal details
- Born: Edward Joseph Flynn; September 22, 1891; New York City, New York, U.S.
- Died: August 18, 1953 (aged 61); Dublin, Ireland
- Political party: Democratic
- Education: Fordham University (LLB)

Edward Joseph Flynn (September 22, 1891 – August 18, 1953) was an American lawyer and politician. Flynn was a leading Democratic politician of the mid-twentieth-century, known for his tight control of the Bronx Democratic Party organization after 1922, and his close association with Presidents Franklin D. Roosevelt and Harry S. Truman.

== Life ==
Flynn was the youngest son of Henry T. Flynn and Sarah Mallon Flynn. He was born on September 22, 1891, in the Bronx, then New York County, now Bronx County, New York City. He graduated from Fordham Law School in 1912, was admitted to the bar in June 1913, and practiced in the Bronx. On June 15, 1927, he married Helen Margaret Jones.

He entered politics as a Democrat; and was a member of the New York State Assembly (Bronx Co., 2nd D.) in 1918, 1919, 1920 and 1921.

Flynn was sheriff of Bronx County, New York, (1922–1925), chamberlain of the City of New York (1926–1928), chairman of the Executive Committee of the Bronx County Democratic Committee (1922–1953), secretary of state of New York state (1929–1939), Democratic national committeeman from New York (1930–1953), and chairman of the Democratic National Committee (1940–1943). He was also the United States commissioner general on the New York World's Fair Commission (1939–1940). On June 10, 1925, Flynn was conferred the honorary degree of Doctor of Laws by Fordham University for his service as sheriff of Bronx County.

He was a close associate of President Franklin D. Roosevelt for many years. Along with James Farley he was the president's chief advisor of patronage. He helped Roosevelt through all of his elections, but repeatedly refused offers of jobs in the Roosevelt administration. He did accompany Roosevelt to the Yalta Conference remaining in Europe afterwards to carry out various missions for the president. His mission was to open a diplomatic relationship between the Kremlin and the Papacy. The President believed that peace could only be obtained in Eastern Europe if there was large Catholic presence. After his mission, Flynn traveled to England to meet with Prime Minister Winston Churchill. His work in England was cut short by Roosevelt's death; this death marked the end of Flynn's mission in Europe. In 1947, Flynn published You're the Boss, a memoir of his experiences in politics.

Flynn was one of the key figures in electing Harry S. Truman to each term of his presidency. His support in 1944 was crucial to Truman's selection over James F. Byrnes as the vice presidential nominee of the Democratic Party, and thus Truman subsequently becoming president upon Roosevelt's death. Flynn warned that placing Byrnes on the ticket would cost Roosevelt two hundred thousand black votes in New York State alone. He was also one of the driving forces behind Truman's 1948 election victory.

Flynn died on August 18, 1953, in Dublin while on a visit to Ireland. His papers were given by his family to the Franklin D. Roosevelt Presidential Library and Museum, to be made available for the general public.

== Legacy ==
The phrase "in like Flynn" has sometimes been claimed to be a reference to Flynn, though its folk etymology more frequently associates it with actor Errol Flynn. Etymologist Eric Partridge presents evidence that candidates Flynn backed were almost automatically "in", citing usage during Flynn's life that refers to him.

His son Richard Flynn became chairman of the Power Authority under Mario Cuomo.

Political offices
Preceded by Robert Moses	Secretary of State of New York; 1929–1939	Succeeded by Michael F. Walsh
Party political offices
Preceded by James Farley	Chair of the Democratic National Committee; 1940–1943	Succeeded by Frank C. Walker
New title	Chairman of the Executive Committee of the Bronx County Democratic Committee; 1922 – 1953	Succeeded by Charles A. Buckley
