= St. Jerome's Church (Bronx) =

Church in New York, United States

Coordinates: 40°48′35″N 73°55′30″W

The Church of St. Jerome
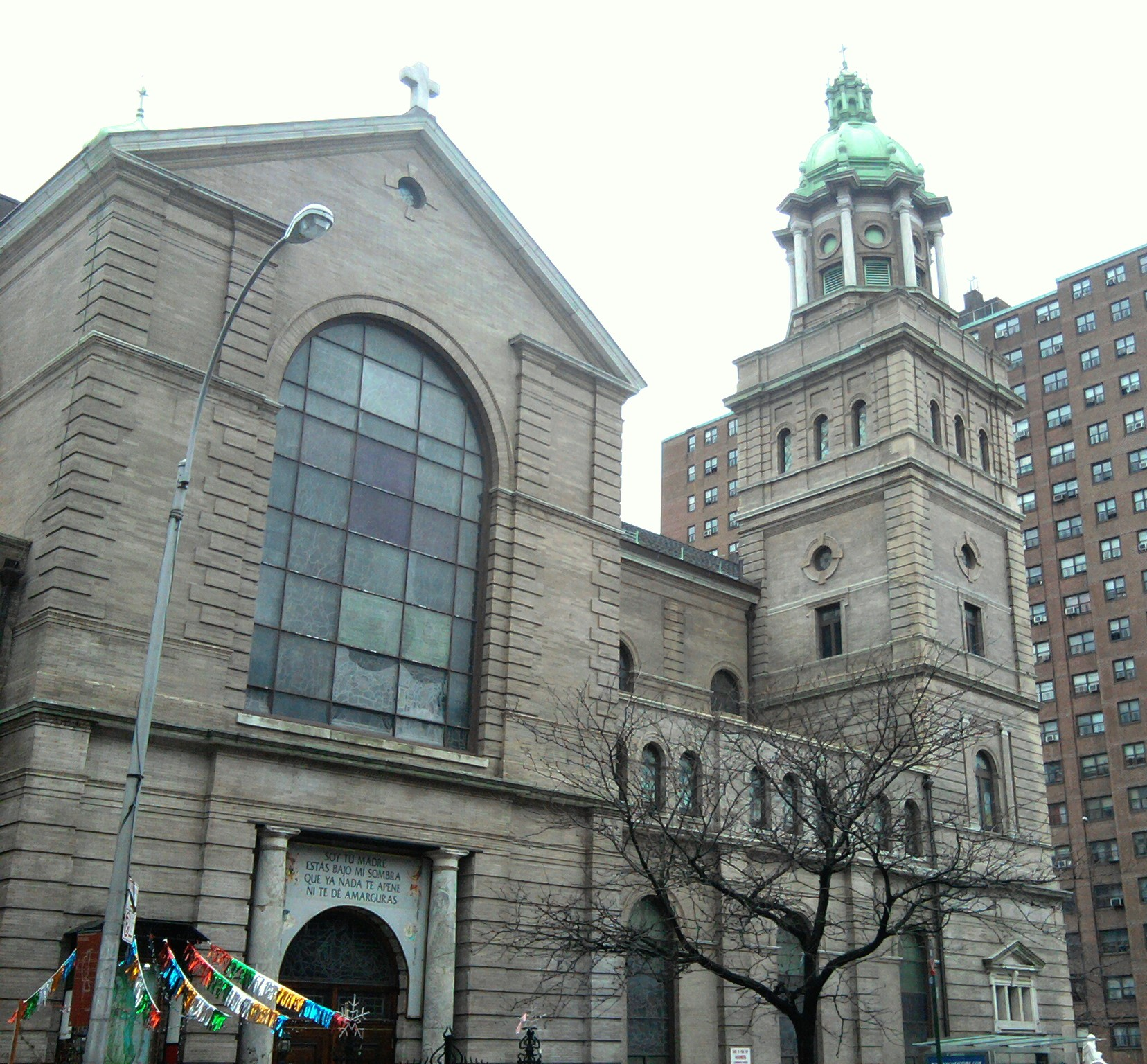

General information
- Architectural style: Italianate, Baroque Revival
- Location: Mott Haven, Bronx, New York City, United States of America
- Construction started: 1898 (for church)
- Completed: 1871 (for school); 1900 (for church)
- Cost: Around $100,000 (for 1898-1900 church and convent additions)
- Client: Roman Catholic Archdiocese of New York

Technical details
- Structural system: Masonry brick and Dorchester stone

Design and construction
- Architect: Delhi & Howard of 1193 Broadway

The Church of St. Jerome is a Roman Catholic parish church under the authority of the Roman Catholic Archdiocese of New York, located at 230 Alexander Avenue, Mott Haven, Bronx, New York City.

== Parish history ==
The parish was established in 1869 by the Rev. John J. Hughes to serve Irish and German immigrants. A combined school and church building was dedicated on June 19, 1870. St. Jerome's was listed as being at its present site on the corner of Alexander Avenue and E 137th Street in 1892. The parish of St. Luke's Church (Bronx, New York) was separated from St. Jerome's in 1897.

The parish has seen a number of demographic shifts. In the 1930s, Puerto Rican families moving into the area. As the Puerto Ricans moved on, Mexican immigrants form the largest population in the community with small numbers of Dominicans and West Africans. In recognition of this, Father John Grange made a shrine of Our Lady of Guadalupe.

== Pastors ==
- Father John J. Hughes, 1869
- Father Patrick Tandy, -1901
- Father John Grange, -2008
- Fr. Gustavo Nieto, IVE
- Fr. Jorge Randle, IVE
- Fr. Javier Correa-Llano, I.V.E (Institute of the Incarnate Word)

== Buildings ==
St. Jerome's Church Complex spans a block and consists of a church, rectory, and elementary school.

The Italianate / Baroque Revival church was built 1898–1900 to the designs of Delhi & Howard. It is located on the southeast corner of Alexander Avenue and East 138 Street. The New York Times reported on June 13, 1898, that "ground will be broken in a few days for a new church.... the new edifice is to cost about $100,000, and when completed will be one of the finest churches in the Borough of the Bronx. For several years past the present church, which is very old has been inadequate to meet the demands of the growing congregation. Plans for the new structure have been prepared by Dehli and Howard, Architects of 1193 Broadway. The church will be of brick and Dorchester stone, and will have a frontage of 80 feet on Alexander Avenue and a depth of 156 feet. One tall bell tower and two smaller towers will surmount the front of the building....The church proper will have a seating capacity of about 1,000 in the body and a gallery which will run back to the transepts, will accommodate about 400...."

The church has two towers, the one on the corner higher and more elaborate.

The address for the rectory is St Jerome's Church Rectory, 230 Alexander Avenue, Bronx, New York 10454-3800. The Victorian Gothic red brick three-story school over basement with sandstone trim is located on the other corner, at East 137 Street and Alexander Avenue. The school was built in 1871. and 222 Alexander Avenue, Bronx New York 10454. In 1898, it was reported that "the erection of the new church will necessitate the moving of the Academy of the Ursuline Sisters, a three-story and basement brick structure now directly in the rear of the present church> it will be moved further east on 137th Street, and additions will be made to it."

== St. Jerome Elementary School ==
The school building dates from 1871 and was staffed for many years by the Ursuline sisters. In 1928, the Brothers of the Christian Schools began teaching the older boys there. In 1928. Another building was purchased about 100' east of 222 Alexander Ave., on E 137th St, in 1928 which became the boys' section of the school. Between the Ursuline convent, which faced E. 137th St., and the boys' school, a secluded garden was created for the nuns to recite the Office as they walked in a circle. St. Jerome's School closed in 2013.
