= Henry Casimir de Rham =

Swiss–American merchant and diplomat

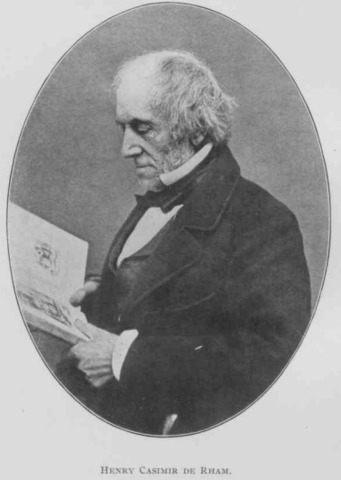
- Portrait of de Rham sitting and reading a book, c. 1864

Honorary consul of Honorary Consulate of Switzerland in New York
- In office 25 July 1822 – 1847

Personal details
- Born: Henri Casimir de Rham; July 15, 1785 Giez, Switzerland
- Died: November 6, 1873 (aged 88) New York City, U.S.
- Spouse: Maria Theresa Moore (m. 1813; died 1855)
- Children: 4, including Charles
- Occupation: Merchant, banker, diplomat

Henry Casimir de Rham (/də ˈrɑːm/; də RAHM; July 15, 1785 – November 6, 1873) colloquially also known by his initials H.C. de Rham was a Swiss-born American merchant, banker and diplomat who served as one of the first consuls of Switzerland to the U.S. from 1822 to 1847.

De Rham originally hailed from old family of Braunschweig nobility from Lower Saxony who established themselves in Giez in Vaud, Switzerland in the 18th century, but only becoming Swiss citizens in 1816. De Rham arrived in New York City in 1803, opening a subsidiary (or less likely his own firm), for a European textile firm.

Through additional participations, namely de Rham, Iselin & Moore (later known as de Rham & Moore, a textile and merchant banking firm, he among others of Swiss nobility rose up to the most prominent in the social circles of New York City. Since 1835, De Rham owned the DeRham Farm, in Philipstown, New York, where he spent summers and weekends. He was the patriarch of the American branch of the De Rham family.

== Early life and education ==
De Rham was born 15 July 1785 in Giez, Switzerland, one of two sons, to Wilhelm de Rham, originally of Braunschweig, Saxony, and Anne de Rham (née Kinloch; 1742–1813), of peerage of Scotland. His older brother, Jacques de Rham, married Adélaïde Doxat, whose family owned the Château de Champvent.

His maternal grandfather was Sir James Kinloch, Bt. of Scotland. He attended the military school in Munich, Bavaria.

== Career ==
In 1803 he had opened a business in New York City. After the War of 1812 he entered business relationship with Isaac Iselin Roulet. After his 1815 marriage, two of his wife's brothers became partners in the business known as de Rham, Iselin & Moore (later known as de Rham & Moore, but at the time of his death as de Rham & Company).

In July 1822 de Rham was appointed to be one of the first two Swiss consuls to the United States by the Federal Diet of Switzerland. He assumed responsibility for a district encompassing the New England states, New York, New Jersey, Pennsylvania, Delaware, and the states north of the Ohio River. In 1847, de Rham retired from his office as the Swiss consul. In his later life he was an avid Whist player and joined a Whist club.

== Personal life ==
In 1815, de Rham married Maria Theresa Moore (1784–1855), a daughter of Jane (née Fish) Moore and Dr. William Moore (a brother of Bishop Benjamin Moore). Together, they had four children:

- Henry Casimir de Rham Jr. (1817–1840), who was a naturalist and specimen collector. After his death, his collection (including fossils, minerals and fish) was donated to the University of the State of New York's Cabinet of Natural History. He is honored in the name of the Garnet-throated hummingbird.
- Julia Antoinette de Rham (1821–1894)
- Charles de Rham (1822–1909), who married Laura Friedrich Schmidt, daughter of Eliza Ann (née Bache) Schmidt and John William Schmidt, who served more than fifty years as Consul-General in New York for Prussia, Saxony, and Baden. Her paternal grandfather, Dr. Georg Schmidt, was court physician to Queen Louise of Prussia, and her maternal grandfather, William Bache, was a son of Theophylact Bache.
- Laura de Rham (born 1826)

He died in October 1873 in New York City. He was interred alongside his wife at St. Mark's Church in-the-Bowery.

=== Descendants ===
Through his son Charles, he was a grandfather of Elise De Rham (1850–1879), who married John Jay Pierrepont; Charles de Rham (1854–1933), who married Emily Hone Foster; Henry Casimir de Rham (1855–1916), who married Anna Tayloe Warren and Georgina Louise Berryman; and William de Rham (1857–1881).
