= Dark Princess =

1928 novel by W. E. B. Du Bois

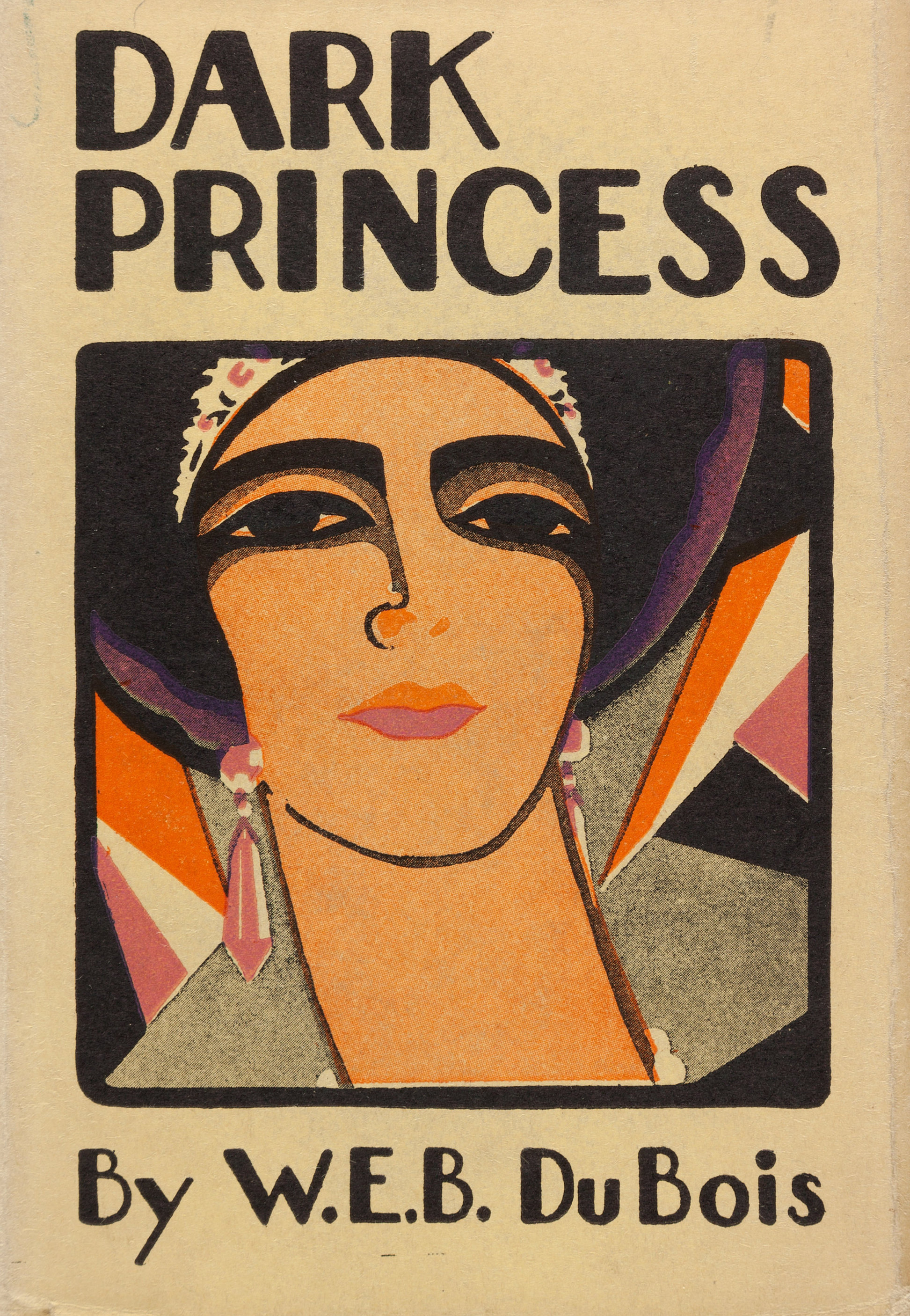
- First edition cover
- Author: W. E. B. Du Bois
- Language: English
- Genre: Fiction
- Published: 1928 by Harcourt Brace
- Publication place: United States
- Media type: Print
- Pages: 311 pp
- OCLC: 6065492
- Dewey Decimal: 813.52
- LC Class: PS3507.U147

Dark Princess, written by sociologist W. E. B. Du Bois in 1928, and entered the United States public domain in 2024, is one of five historical novels. Considered one of his favorite works, the novel explores themes of double consciousness, racial solidarity, and romance as a form of double meaning. Through its blending of romance, fiction, and realism, Du Bois examines historical experiences in a way that the non-fiction genre does not allow. The lives of the characters in the novel, every success, failure, or heartbreak, were created to correlate with real historical events. The novel received mixed reactions from both early and modern-day readers. It was often recognized for how it distinguished itself from Du Bois's early works.

== Historical contexts ==
Some critics believe that the book was inspired by the 1911 First Universal Races Congress in London, which Du Bois had attended. In developing the character of Kautilya, Du Bois has been discussed as possibly drawing inspiration from a few historical figures. Scholars have speculated that these may include an unnamed Indian princess at the Universal Races Congress, the Indian independence activist Bhikaji Cama, and the Pan-African Congress organizer Ida Gibbs Hunt, wife of diplomat William Henry Hunt.

Late in life, Du Bois described this as his favorite work.

== Plot ==
Dark Princess has a total of four chapters: "The Exile," "The Pullman Porter," "The Chicago Politician," and "The Maharaja of Bwodphur". The novel opens in New York in 1923, with an African American man named Matthew Townes, a junior in medical school at the University of Manhattan, studying to become an obstetrician. Townes receives news that not only is he barred from pursuing his career aspirations, but he is also prevented from completing his academic studies. The dean of the institution claims that his status as an African American man disqualifies him from completing required courses at a white obstetrics hospital, where he would be caring for white female patients.

Out of frustration and anger, Townes sails out with no destination in mind, fleeing from the injustice and racism of America. He arrives in Germany, where he meets Princess Kautilya of Bwodpur, India, daughter of a Maharajah. They share a moment of vulnerability after being met with the same experience of racism in Berlin as Matthew did in America. She reassures Towns of the importance of the history of people of color in the world, and of their presence and impact of their beauty worldwide. The Princess takes him from his dreary American world with its strict binary divide by race. She introduces him to a vibrant world of prominent world leaders of color, while acknowledging some with a negative influence on the progress of blacks in the United States.

The relationship between Townes and the princess develops; she bears his child, who by birthright is the Maharajah of Bwodpur. Townes had not thought it possible that an African American man might have such a connection to royalty.

== Major themes ==
=== Double Consciousness ===
The philosophical concept of double consciousness, derived from the idea of psychic duality, describes the internal conflict experienced by African Americans as they navigate external perception with self-perception. Scholar James Stewart describes it as a tension between opposing societal demands and expectations.

In Dark Princess, W. E. B. Du Bois utilizes his protagonist, Matthew Towns, to explore and articulate this experience. Early in the novel, Matthew Towns believes that "prejudice was a miasma that character burned away", reflecting confidence in meritocracy and individual success. However, despite being educated and hardworking, an embodiment of what the "ideal American" should exhibit, he was denied admission to continuing medical school due to racial discrimination and systemic barriers. This experience prompts Matthew Towns’ shift in perspective: now aware of African Americans’ racial reality, he begins to question his own beliefs. This realization highlights the beginning of Matthew Towns’ double consciousness emerging, reconciling his previous belief that an individual’s merits can overcome racial inequality.

=== Racial Solidarity ===
Du Bois explores racial solidarity as both a global and psychological concept. Internationally, Dark Princess connects African American identity to the "darker world," solidifying African Americans within the global network of colonized peoples working to resist Western imperialism.

After his self-exile from the United States, Matthew Towns meets Princess Kautilya of Bwodpur, India. Upon their introduction at a cafe in Berlin, Matthew and Kautilya converse about American racism and Matthew’s personal experience with discrimination, prompting his introduction to "a great committee of the darker peoples; of those who suffer under the arrogance and tyranny of the white world." This group consisted of individuals from India, China, Egypt, and Arabia, symbolizing a unification of non-white nations’ shared experiences of racial oppression and resistance.

Simultaneously, James Stewart further explains Du Bois’s idea that racial solidarity is tied to individual identity and group pride through the psychological profile of the "race man," someone who remains connected to their culture and works for the uplift and progression of their people. Du Bois connects these ideals, revealing that racial solidarity functions as both a global alliance and the foundation for identity.

=== Romance as an ideological double meaning ===
Dark Princess’s subtitle, A Romance, points to the narrative’s double meaning. As Michèle Mendelssohn argues, it is both a love story and an ideological romance that challenges one of the United States’ most important self-attributes of being a land of progression and opportunity for all. The loss of Matthew’s relationship with the United States due to its betrayal becomes the force behind the novel’s political shift, conveying a larger critique of American society. The double meaning of the title and the plot of the novel demonstrate how Du Bois uses romance to question the ideals of America and how they show their love to their citizens. Additionally, the relationship between Matthew and Kautilya is a reflection of the political message in the novel. Their connection and adoration for one another were developed outside of the United States, symbolizing a political shift away from American ideals of progress and equality.

== Critical reception ==
Upon the release of the novel in 1928, Aubrey Bowser, a literary critic for the New York Amsterdam News, a Black-owned newspaper, published a review of Dark Princess titled "A New Du Bois" on May 9, 1928. Bowser introduces the public to the change in Du Bois’ ideologies found in the publication of his novel and explores its impact on society.

By the late 1920s, many individuals, both black and white, had settled on Booker T. Washington's approach of how to address the "Negro problem." Washington advocated for vocational studies and gradual accommodation, but Du Bois challenged this by urging people of color to confront systematic racial inequality.

Prior to the creation and publication of Dark Princess, Du Bois’s works, like The Souls of Black Folks, centered on the advancement, condition, and identity of Black people, along with racial inequality, within the United States. Bowser describes his previous writings as "polemic," reinforcing society’s primary perception of him as only a sociologist and political writer. Because of this preconception, people did not expect Du Bois to produce a work of fiction successfully.

Dark Princess stood out because it broke the barriers of literary work, becoming the "first Black novel to stand out." Du Bois had already broken racial barriers regarding Black intellect and writings, but this book revealed a different dimension. By merging elements of politics, romance, and realism, Du Bois solidified their stance in the literary realm. He disabused the idea that an individual cannot be both a great intellect and a great storyteller.

Readers even noted that the novel preserves the complexities found in its characters and events that unfold throughout the narrative while admiring the romance and fictional storytelling. This approach was unconventional for African American literature at the time but resulted in the broadening of people’s perception of Black authorship and potential in literature.

This demonstrates Du Bois’s ambition to challenge traditional boundaries of genre and subject. Critics and readers both were intrigued by his mastery of intertwining, adding to one of W. E. B. Du Bois’s many literary achievements. Overall, Bowser's review claims Dark Princess successfully and rightfully distinguishes itself from Du Bois’s earlier writings, marking the beginning of a new era for W. E. B. Du Bois.

== See also ==
- 1928 in literature
- Lists of books
