= Jonathan Clarkson Gibbs =

American minister and politician (1821–1874)

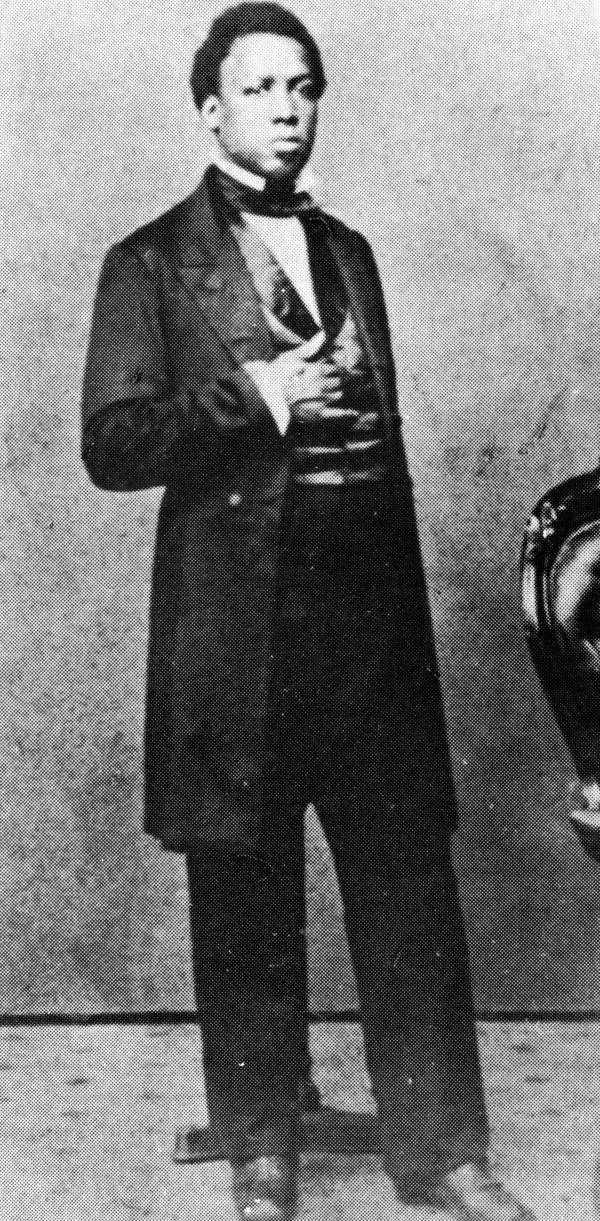

7th Secretary of State of Florida
- In office 1868–1873
- Governor: Harrison Reed; Ossian B. Hart
- Preceded by: George J. Alden
- Succeeded by: Samuel B. McLin

4th Florida Superintendent of Public Instruction
- In office 1873–1874
- Preceded by: Charles Beecher
- Succeeded by: William Watkin Hicks

Personal details
- Born: September 28, 1821 Philadelphia, Pennsylvania, U.S.
- Died: August 14, 1874 (aged 52) Tallahassee, Florida, U.S.
- Party: Republican
- Spouse(s): Anna Amelia Harris, (divorced), and Elizabeth F. Gibbs
- Relations: Brother, Mifflin Wistar Gibbs; Niece, Ida Alexander Gibbs; Niece, Harriet Gibbs Marshall; Nephew-in-law, William Henry Hunt (diplomat)

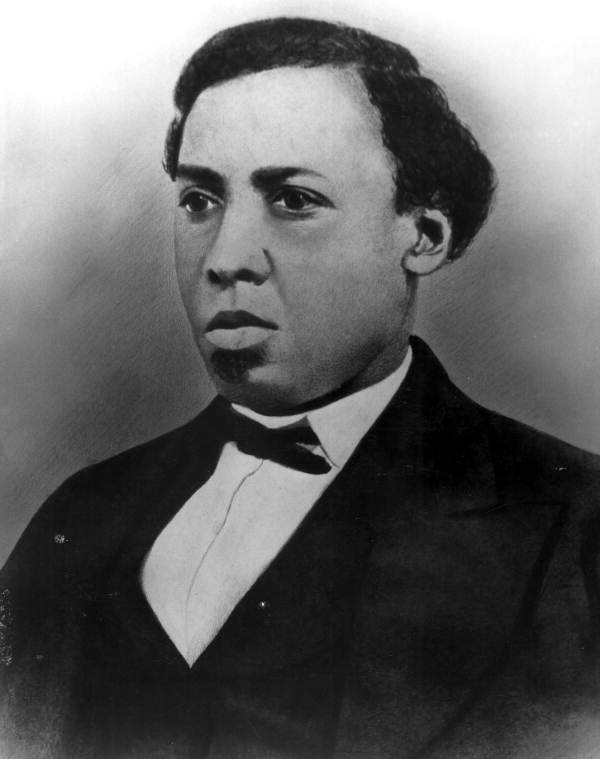
Gibbs between 1868 and 1874

Jonathan Clarkson Gibbs, II (September 28, 1821 – August 14, 1874) was an American Presbyterian minister who served as Secretary of State and Superintendent of Public Instruction of Florida, and, along with U.S. Congressman Josiah Thomas Walls, was among the most powerful black officeholders in the state during Reconstruction. An African American who served during the Reconstruction era, he was the first black Florida Secretary of State, holding the office over a century prior to the state's second black Secretary of State, Jesse McCrary, who served for five months in 1979.

== Early life ==
=== Philadelphia ===
Gibbs was born free in Philadelphia, Pennsylvania, on September 28, 1821. His father was Reverend Jonathan Gibbs I, a Methodist minister, and his mother, Maria Jackson was a Baptist. Jonathan C. Gibbs II was the oldest of four children born to the couple. He grew up in Philadelphia during a time when the city was rife with anti-black and anti-abolitionist sentiments. Gibbs and his brother, Mifflin Wistar Gibbs, attended the local Free School in Philadelphia.

Though not much is known about the details of his early life, Jonathan Clarkson Gibbs grew up in a Philadelphia, where anti-black riots and violence were quite common. Following the death of his father in April 1831, Gibbs and his brother left the Free School to aid their ailing mother and earn a living. The young Gibbs apprenticed to a carpenter. Both brothers eventually converted to Presbyterianism. Gibbs so impressed the Presbyterian assembly that it provided financial backing for him to attend Kimball Union Academy in Meriden, New Hampshire.

=== New Hampshire ===
Gibbs attended Kimball Union Academy (KUA) at Meriden, New Hampshire, and graduated in 1848. At the time, the academy was under the guidance of an abolitionist principal, Cyrus Smith Richards, who had earlier allowed Augustus Washington (who would also attend Dartmouth) to study at the academy. Washington is best known for a famous daguerreotype of John Brown. At KUA, Gibbs became acquainted with Charles Barrett, a native of Grafton, Vermont, who would become one of his closest friends. The two went on to Dartmouth College, and, later, Barrett returned to his native Vermont and served in politics.

While Gibbs was a student, Dartmouth was under the presidency of pro-slavery Nathan Lord. Lord was originally an anti-slavery advocate who had voted for the Liberty Party and had written editorials in The Liberator. His sudden conversion was due to his conservative brand of Calvinism; he felt that reformers may have been going too far in their zeal against slavery. Notwithstanding Lord's views regarding slavery, which stemmed in large part from his belief that the institution was predicated on sin, he permitted several African Americans to attend the college. Lord believed that any group of people who sinned against God could be enslaved (including whites).

While at the college, Gibbs was influenced by three professors who would affect his thinking as a missionary, educator and politician. He was a member of the abolitionist movement while a college student, and participated in several conventions, appearing by name in The Liberator.

He was the third African American to graduate from Dartmouth College. Following John Brown Russwurm, Gibbs became the second black man in the nation to deliver a commencement address at a college.

== Abolitionist minister ==
=== New York and the Abolitionist Movement ===
Following his graduation in 1852, Gibbs studied at Princeton Theological Seminary from 1853 to 1854, but he did not graduate due to financial constraints. At the seminary, Gibbs studied under Charles Hodge, a pro-slavery advocate. Hodge, a Presbyterian minister, espoused the belief that "slavery as such was not condemned by Scripture but that the way it was practiced in the South perpetuated great evil." Unlike Nathan Lord, Hodge did support the war effort and President Abraham Lincoln. Though Gibbs was unable to graduate from the seminary, he was ordained in 1856. He was called as a pastor of Liberty Street Presbyterian Church in Troy, New York, where Henry Highland Garnet had been pastor. Gibbs invited the pro-slavery president of Dartmouth College, Nathan Lord, to give the ordination sermon. He "begged Dr. Lord as a special favor to preach his ordination sermon, giving as a reason that his college was the only (one) which would endure his presence." Lord delivered the sermon as a result of the absence of other ministers.

Gibbs, by now a young minister, married Anna Amelia Harris, the daughter of a well-to-do black New York merchant and his wife. The couple had three children: Thomas Van Renssalaer Gibbs, Julia Pennington Gibbs and Josephine Haywood Gibbs.

Following his ordination, Gibbs became active in the abolitionist movement. He attended a series of black conventions, where he worked with Frederick Douglass and served on committees. He gradually became known nationally for his work in the movement. Gibbs was featured in anti-slavery publications including The Liberator and The National Anti-Slavery Standard. His rising fame was indicative of Gibbs's own ambitions as well his skills as an orator and rising abolitionist minister. His growing involvement in New York's abolitionist movement separated him from his family. In part due to his extensive absences from home and his parish duties, Gibbs became increasingly alienated from his wife. Anna was accustomed to living standards that a young pastor could not afford. The tension between husband and wife prompted Gibbs to consider leaving the United States for Africa to work as a missionary. However, he was persuaded by his congregation to abandon these plans. The marital discord eventually led to lengthy and bitter divorce proceedings, which lasted until 1862. Not long afterward, Gibbs returned to his native Philadelphia, where he continued to work in the abolitionist movement.

=== Return to Philadelphia ===
Gibbs served as pastor of the First African Presbyterian Church in Philadelphia from 1859 to 1865. He became active in the abolitionist movement, "a key figure in the local underground railroad and contributed articles to the Anglo-African Magazine."

Following President Abraham Lincoln's announcement of the Emancipation Proclamation, Gibbs delivered a sermon titled "Freedom's Joyful Day," emphasizing that whites should crush their prejudices and that blacks should be allowed to fight in the Civil War. Gibbs noted that, "We, the colored men of the North, put the laboring oar in your hand; it is for white men to show that they are equal to the demands of these times, by putting away their stupid prejudices." He touched upon the need for blacks to fight by addressing white concerns and prejudices stating unequivocally that:

Many persons are asking, Will black men fight? That is not what they mean. The question they are asking is simply this: Have white men of the North the same moral courage, the pluck, the grit, to lay down their foolish prejudice against the colored man and place him in a position where he can bear his full share of the toils and dangers of this war?

Along with William Still, Gibbs fought for equal accommodations and transportation in Philadelphia, decrying segregation of the city's rail cars. In a blunt article published in December 1864 in the National Anti-Slavery Standard, Still and Gibbs asked "Why, then, should the fear exist that the very people who are meeting with colored people in various other directions without insulting them, should instantly become so intolerably incensed as to indicate a terrible aspect in this particular?" They wrote further that:

It is well known that through the efforts of the Supervisory Committee of this city ten or eleven regiments of colored men have been raised for the United States service, and not a few of these brave men have already won imperishable honor on the battle-field. Nevertheless, thrice the number that have been thus raised for the defence of the country are daily and hourly compelled to endure all the outrages and inconveniences consequent upon rules so severe and inexorable as those which have hitherto governed the roads of Philadelphia.

Gibbs's efforts in the movement to abolish slavery helped both free blacks and their enslaved brethren. As the Civil War drew to a close, Gibbs left Philadelphia and journeyed to the South to help rebuild the former Confederate states and to educate the ex-slaves and poor whites who were left destitute in the wake of the bloody ravages of war.

=== Move to the South ===
On December 18, 1864, Gibbs announced his departure from the First African Presbyterian Church. One factor was "a bitter divorce" which "scandalized his Philadelphia congregation". He "was invited to go South for several months to look to the needs of Freedmen." His endeavor expanded into a project of several years, as Gibbs labored alongside other missionaries as part of the American Home Missionary Society. Gibbs arrived at New Bern, North Carolina, where he wrote a letter published in The Christian Recorder. He described postwar conditions: "The destitution and suffering of this people extended my wildest dream; old men and women bending to the ground, heads white with the frosts and hardships of many winters, as well as the innocent babe of a few weeks, contribute to make up this scene of misery." Gibbs eventually settled in Charleston, South Carolina, where he became established in a local church and opened a school for the children of freedmen in 1865, Wallingford Academy.

Freedmen faced uncertainty as well as great opportunities. As early as 1866, the need for missionary activities among the freedmen was mentioned prominently in The First Annual Report of the General Assembly's Committee on Freedmen of the Presbyterian Church in the United States of America. The Report stated, "The condition of the freedmen, their native peculiarities, and the various influences to which they are subjected, have much to do in determining the success of missions, and the plan of the church's operation for their benefit." This same report also illuminated the perspective of Northern missionaries in dealing with the situation, saying that newly freed blacks are

passing through 'a howling wilderness' of social, political, and religious problems, as striking and peculiar as those found by the Israelites in their journey from the 'house of bondage' to the land of their fathers. And all these problems impinge upon the work of their religious education, in every branch of it, either directly or remotely.

Missionary activity in the South was not a new occurrence. The Great Awakening had been a period during which many missionaries evangelized in the region. In addition, contraband camps had been set up near many forts, and some missionaries lived and worked among them. Historian Steven Hahn has noted that:

The missionaries and reformers, charged as many were with evangelical fervor, sought not only to strike fatal blows against the institution of slavery but also to reshape the character and morals of the institutions direct victims. Assuming, for the most part, that the slaves had emerged from an experience of degradation and cultural barbarism, they expected to teach essential lessons in the proper conduct of faith, family, health, and livelihood as well as in the rudiments of reading and writing.

The established missionary work among freed blacks in the South was augmented by activities such as those of Gibbs. He believed in the power of education and the connection (expressed in the 1866 report) between religious duties and the task of uplifting nearly four million freedmen. In a letter to his old friend, Charles Barrett of Vermont, Gibbs proudly stated that he "had one school that daily average in Charleston, 1000, children, and some 20 teachers."

During his time in South Carolina, Gibbs also became involved in Republican political activities during Reconstruction. Gibbs participated in a meeting of black delegates who drafted a petition demanding that the educated of both races be allowed to vote, suggesting that he may have had some elitism. The petition also said "we do ask that if the ignorant white man is allowed to vote, that the ignorant colored man shall be allowed to vote also." Gibbs noted that, "If we can secure, for the next ten years, three clean shirts a week, a tooth brush, and spelling-book to every Freedman in South Carolina, I will go bail (a thing I seldom do) for the next hundred years, that we will have no more slavery, and both whites and blacks will be happier and better friends."

During this period, Gibbs met and married his second wife, Elizabeth. They had at least once child, who died in infancy. Gibbs "remained [in Charleston] but a short time not finding things to his liking. He proceeded to Jacksonville, Florida and there opened an Academy for youth of that city."

== Reconstruction politician ==
=== 1868 Constitutional Convention and rise to Secretary of State ===
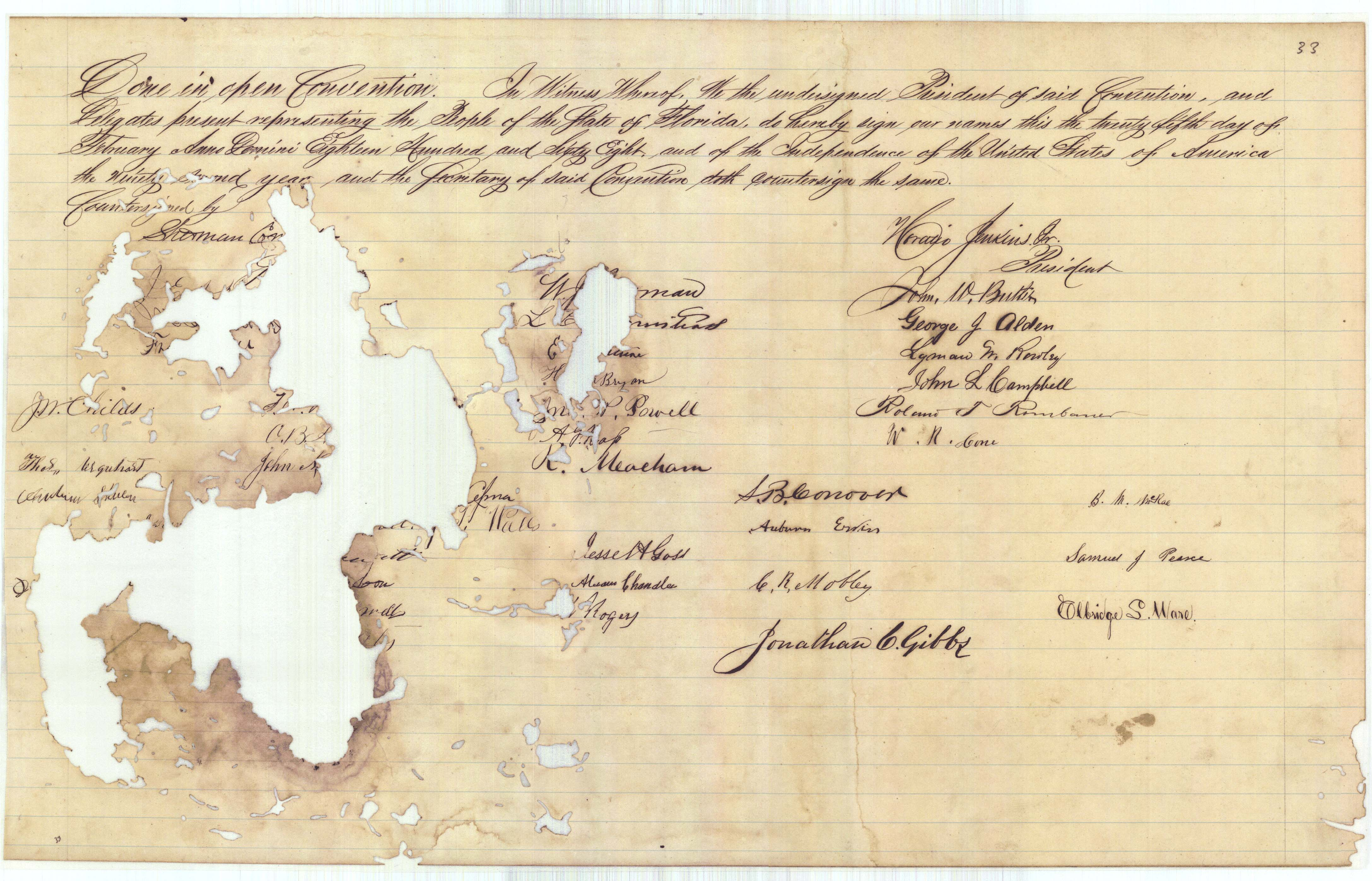
The 1868 Florida Constitution, signed by Jonathan Clarkson Gibbs.

Gibbs moved to Florida in 1867, where he started a private school in Jacksonville. He rapidly shifted from missionary work to political involvement in Reconstruction Florida. Religion and politics went hand-in-hand for black officeholders in this period. Another prominent black officeholder, Charles H. Pearce, remarked that "A man in this State, cannot do his whole duty as a minister except he looks out for the political interests of his people."

Gibbs was elected to the State Constitutional Convention of 1868. He formed part of the radical Mule Team faction within the convention that initially gained control of the convention, only to be thwarted by more moderate and conservative delegates led by Harrison Reed and Ossian Bingley Hart. Canter Brown, Jr. wrote of the resulting constitution that:

While it established the state's most liberal charter to that date, it incorporated important restrictions on black political power. It permitted most former Rebels to vote, at the same time specifying a legislative apportionment plan that discriminated again black-majority counties in favor of sparsely populated white counties. The drafters retained one item especially important to black leaders. The constitution directed the legislature to create a uniform system of public schools.

The Mule Team nominated its own slate of candidates, opposing the more conservative faction of Republicans that nominated Gibbs for Florida's seat in the U.S. House of Representatives. Ultimately, the Mule Team coalition fractured in the wake of the successful election of a moderate Republican administration and Congressional approval of the 1868 Constitution.

Though Gibbs did not win the election to Congress, he was appointed Florida's Secretary of State, serving from 1868 to 1872, by Massachusetts-born Republican governor, Harrison Reed. Gibbs wielded considerable power and responsibility during his four years as Secretary of State. In a letter to his close friend, Charles Barrett, Gibbs remarked that, "In 1868 I was appointed by the Governor and confirmed by the Senate, Secretary of State of Florida at a salary of $3000, per year for four years, and stand second man in the government of this State today." Gibbs' power and influence contradicts some observations made by historians of this period. Eric Foner noted that, "During Reconstruction more blacks served in the essentially ceremonial office of secretary of state than any other post, and by and large, the most important political decisions in every state were made by whites." However, Article VIII of the Constitution states that, "The Superintendent of Public Instruction, Secretary of State, and Attorney General shall constitute a body corporate, to be known as the Board of Education of Florida. The Superintendent of Public Instruction shall be president thereof. The duties of the Board of Education shall be prescribed by the Legislature." Gibbs also was proactive as Secretary of State, conducting extensive investigations into violence and fraud (including investigations into the activities of the Ku Klux Klan), and he also served on the Board of Canvassers, testifying on behalf of Josiah Thomas Walls.

=== Superintendent of Public Instruction ===
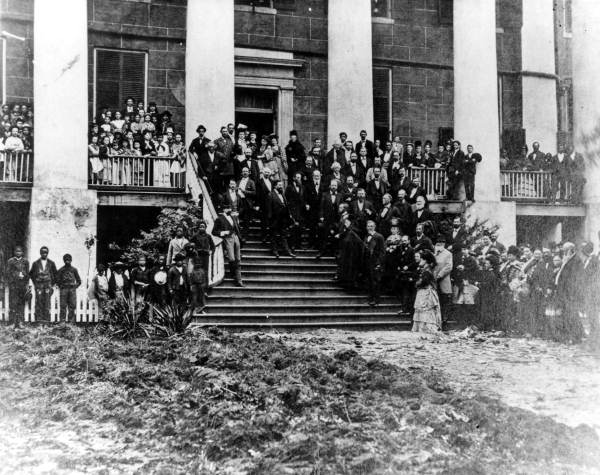
Republican governor Marcellus Stearns greeting Harriet Beecher Stowe. Jonathan Clarkson Gibbs is visible toward one of the columns.

He served as Superintendent of Public Instruction from 1872 to 1874. Gibbs was also commissioned as a lieutenant colonel in the Florida State Militia. Gibbs was also elected as a Tallahassee City Councilman in 1872. His son, Thomas Gibbs, was responsible for introducing legislation creating the State Normal College for Colored Students in 1885, forerunner of Florida A&M University.

== Death ==
Gibbs died on August 14, 1874, in Tallahassee, Florida, reportedly of apoplexy (stroke), "ostensibly from eating too heavy a dinner. It was rumored that he had been poisoned."

== Legacy and impact ==
He was the brother of prominent Arkansas Reconstruction judge Mifflin Wistar Gibbs, and the father of Thomas Van Renssalaer Gibbs, a delegate to the 1886 Florida Constitutional Convention and a member of the Florida state legislature.

- Gibbs High School, the first high school in St. Petersburg for black students, is named after him.
- Gibbs Junior College (also in St. Petersburg) was named after him. The college was merged with St. Petersburg Junior College, now St. Petersburg College.

== See also ==
- African American officeholders from the end of the Civil War until before 1900

== Notes ==
Political offices
Preceded by George J. Alden	Secretary of State of Florida; 1868–1873	Succeeded by Samuel B. McLin
