= Coralie Franklin Cook =

Educator and government official (1861–1942)

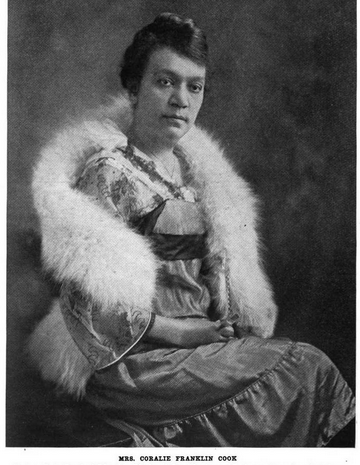
- Coralie Franklin Cook, in a 1917 issue of The Crisis.
- Born: 1861; Lexington, Virginia
- Died: 1942 (aged 80–81)
- Occupations: Women's rights activist, educator and public speaker.

Coralie Franklin Cook (March 1861 – August 25, 1942) was an African-American educator, public speaker, and government official. She is also the first known descendant among those enslaved at Thomas Jefferson's Monticello estate to graduate from college. Cook, along with Mary Church Terrell, Anna J. Cooper, Angelina Weld Grimke, and Nannie Helen Burroughs, "exemplified the third generation of African American woman suffragists who related to both the Black and the white worlds."

== Early life ==
Coralie Franklin was born in Lexington, Virginia in March 1861. Coralie was the younger of two daughters from Albert Barbour Franklin and Mary Elizabeth Edmondson, both of whom were enslaved by a Southern aristocratic family. Franklin was a descendant of Elizabeth "Betty" Hemings, an enslaved mixed-race woman, whose children and many descendants occupied the most valued household and tradesman positions at Thomas Jefferson's home, Monticello. Franklin's maternal great-grandfather, Brown Colbert, was a former slave and nailer at the Monticello estate. Colbert was the son of Betty Brown and the grandson of Elizabeth Hemings.

Franklin had one older sister named Mary Elizabeth. In 1870, their father, Albert Franklin, a "very well respected man amongst his community", placed his two daughters in the Storer Normal School at Harpers Ferry. At the time, Storer was administered as a Normal Academy and was the only institution for higher learning available for African Americans in West Virginia. While in school, Coralie Franklin showed a talent for literary studies and reading. She was so proficient in reading that, as a child, it became a special attraction for her to read out loud at public gatherings.

While attending college, Franklin was a member of the Red Cross, the NAACP, the Book Lovers Club and the Juvenile Protective Society. She graduated from Storer College in 1880, the first known college graduate among the descendants of Jefferson's slaves at Monticello. In 1881, Franklin continued her education through institutions in Boston and Philadelphia where she studied elocution. In 1913, Franklin became one of the first four Honorary Members of Delta Sigma Theta sorority

== Career and social activism ==
In the years following her graduation, Franklin Cook taught elocution and English at Storer College as an assistant professor from 1882 until 1893. She also taught a year of school in Hannibal, Missouri, before she and colleague Mary Church Terrell moved to Washington, D.C., to seek careers in education. Franklin Cook taught elocution at Howard University and was a professor at the Washington Conservatory of Music. She served on the Board of Education in Washington D. C., the second African-American woman after Terrell to hold that appointment. Additionally, she spent five years as Director of the Home for Colored Children and Aged Women in Washington, D. C.

Franklin Cook and Terrell became prominent leaders among elite African-American women and the Black Women's Club movement. They were early members of one of the oldest Black women's clubs, the Colored Women's League of Washington, which eventually merged with other groups to form the National Association of Colored Women's Clubs (NACWC) in 1896.

Franklin Cook was active in the woman's suffrage movement. She and Terrell were active members of the National American Woman Suffrage Association (NAWSA) and part of the association's inner circles. Terrell and Franklin Cook appealed to the NAWSA hierarchy because they were educated, professional, middle-class women. In short, they represented the "intelligent" women Elizabeth Cady Stanton and her colleagues hoped to enfranchise.

She was also a member of the Coleridge Taylor Choral Society, and was elected president of the Washington Artists' Association. She spent five years as head of the Home for Colored Orphans and Aged Women in Washington D. C. Later in her life she served as a member of the Council of Social Welfare.

== Speeches and presentations ==
Franklin Cook was a powerful public speaker. She was the only African-American woman invited to give an official statement at Susan B. Anthony's 80th birthday celebration at the Lafayette Opera House in 1900. Her address praised the movement for encouraging women to recognize their potential political power and their responsibility to one another, and emphasized the necessity interracial empathy. She stated, "no woman and no class of women can be degraded and all woman kind not suffer thereby." She was disheartened, however, because she felt as if the cause of African American women was not a priority among white women active in the suffrage movement. She insisted that the elite white women do not ignore the political rights of those that were less fortunate. In fact, she addressed Anthony directly, stating,

"...and so Miss Anthony, in behalf of the hundreds of colored women who wait and hope with you for the day when the ballot shall be in the hands of every intelligent woman; and also in behalf of the thousands who sit in darkness and whose condition we shall expect those ballots to better, whether they be in the hands of white women or Black, I offer you my warmest gratitude and congratulations."

In a speech entitled "Votes for Mothers," Franklin Cook again stressed the importance of enfranchisement for both women and people of color. She stated, "Disfranchisement because of sex is curiously like disfranchisement because of color. It cripples the individual, it handicaps progress, it sets a limitation upon mental and spiritual development."

Franklin Cook spoke at the Colored Women's League convention in Atlanta, Georgia, in 1895, and gave a presentation on "Negro Poets" at the First Race Amity Convention in 1921.

== Personal life ==
In 1884, Franklin purchased a home in Harpers Ferry at 509 Fillmore Street. Franklin purchased the home from Storer College where she was teaching at that time. On August 31, 1898, Franklin married George William Cook, A professor and Dean of the school at Howard University. The Cook's had one son named George William Cook Jr. on Dec. 15, 1901.

Franklin Cook and her husband were married for 33 years until George died on August 20, 1931. Coralie Franklin Cook died in 1942, at 81 years of age.

Franklin Cook's sister Mary Franklin was married to attorney J. R. Clifford, a civil rights leader associated with the Niagara Movement.

== Baháʼí Faith ==
Franklin Cook was an adherent of the Baháʼí Faith, and represented the Baháʼí Faith among the black intellectual community in Washington, D.C. since 1910, and formally converted around 1913. Many Baháʼí activities in the Washington, D.C. area were organized and influenced by Franklin Cook. She felt the beliefs of this faith would benefit young African Americans by helping them realize their potential and provide them with a more positive outlook on life. As a result, she is credited with bringing this faith to Howard University students by organizing meetings on campus. "Her work on race unity and racial uplift activities made valuable inroads in the Black community." Additionally, she wrote a letter to `Abdu'l-Bahá, one of the three central figures of the faith, pleading with him to address the "Race Problem" in the Baháʼí community in the United States, given the faith's central teaching of the oneness of humanity and freedom from prejudice.
