= Lincoln Memorial Cemetery (Suitland, Maryland) =

Historic cemetery in Maryland, U.S.

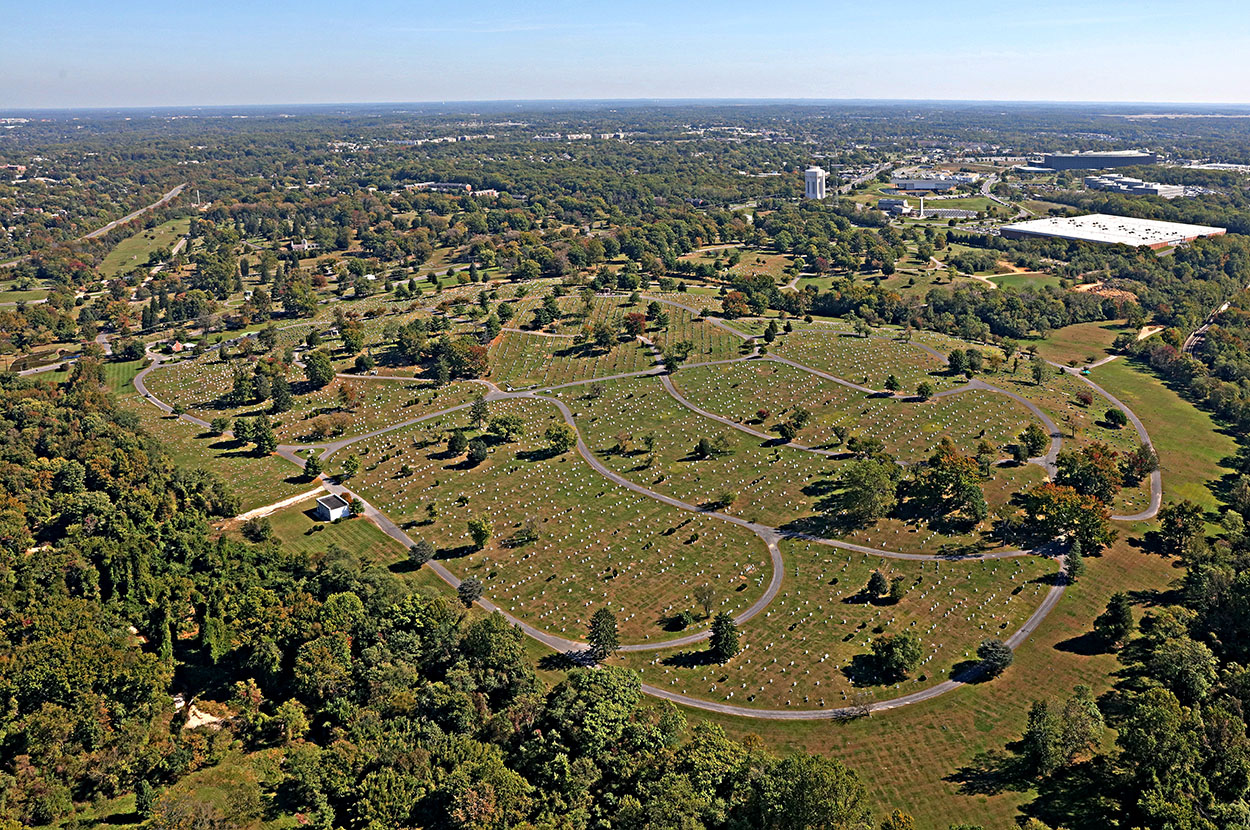
- Lincoln Memorial Cemetery in 2017
- Interactive map of Lincoln Memorial Cemetery

Details
- Established: 1929
- Location: 4001 Suitland Rd, Suitland, Prince George's County, Maryland
- Country: United States
- Coordinates: 38°51′21″N 76°56′55″W
- Type: private
- Website: www.memorialplanning.com/cemeteries/lincoln-memorial-cemetery
- Find a Grave: Lincoln Memorial Cemetery

Lincoln Memorial Cemetery is a commercial, privately owned, historically Black cemetery located on the south side of Suitland Road (Maryland State Highway 218) in Suitland, Maryland. The cemetery is adjacent to Washington National Cemetery and across the street from the historically white Cedar Hill Cemetery. The cemetery was established in 1927 and is the final resting place of many notable African-Americans, including Walter Washington, Charles Richard Drew, Charles Hamilton Houston, Emmett Jay Scott, and Carter Godwin Woodson.

== History ==
Lincoln Memorial Cemetery was founded on part of the Landon dairy farm in 1927 by James Easley Edmunds of Lynchburg, VA for use by Black residents of Washington metropolitan area during a time when cemeteries were segregated and there were few options in the District itself. In the 1920s and 1930s it was one of only two cemeteries for Black residents in the area. The grounds were designed by landscape architect John H. Small.

The most prominent feature in the cemetery is the Bishop W. McCollough mausoleum, which features a statue of the seated Bishop created by Ed Dwight in 1991.

== Other notable interments ==
- Len Bias (1963–1986), Maryland college basketball star
- Gail Cobb (1950–1974), first female police officer in the United States shot and killed in the line of duty
- John Wesley Cromwell Jr. (1883–1971), first African-American certified public accountant (CPA) in the United States
- Charles Richard Drew (1904–1950), medical pioneer in blood transfusions
- Edward "Len" Ford (1926–1972), Pro Football Hall of Fame inductee
- Sarah Loguen Fraser (1850–1933), fourth female African-American physician in the United States
- Ida Gibbs (1862–1957), one of the founders of Pan-Africanism
- Charlotte Wesley Holloman (1922–2015), opera singer
- Charles Hamilton Houston (1895–1950), Civil Rights lawyer, "The Man Who Killed Jim Crow""
- William Henry Hunt (1869–1951), diplomat
- Ernest Everett Just (1883–1941), scientist known for the recognition of the role of the cell surface in the development of organisms
- Sam Lacy (1903–2003), sports journalist
- John A. Lankford (1874–1946), architect, "the Dean of Black Architecture"
- Ulysses G. Lee (1913–1969), soldier, professor, author of The Employment of Negro Troops, coeditor of The Negro Caravan
- Harriet Gibbs Marshall (1868–1941), pianist, writer, and educator of music
- Van McCoy (1940–1979), Grammy-award winning R&B Singer known for "The Hustle"
- Kelly Miller (1863–1939), mathematician, sociologist, essayist, newspaper columnist and author. "The Bard of the Potomac"
- David Foote Rivers (1859–1941), Tennessee legislator and Baptist minister
- Max Robinson (1939–1988), the first African-American broadcast network news anchor in the United States
- Herbert Clay Scurlock (1875–1952), medical researcher
- Lucy Diggs Slowe (1885–1937), first Black woman to serve as Dean of Women at any American university. Founder of Alpha Kappa Alpha sorority
- Martha Cassell Thompson (1925–1968), architect
- Joseph A. Walker (1935–2003), Tony-award winning playwright and educator
- Walter Washington (1915–2003), first elected Mayor of the District of Columbia
- Charles H. Wesley (1891–1987), historian
- Dwight Hillis Wilson (1909–1962), archivist
- Carter G. Woodson (1875–1950), historian, "The Father of African American History"
- Smokey Joe Williams (1886–1951), baseball Hall of Fame honoree
