= Dwight Wilson =

Dwight Wilson may refer to:

- Dwight Wilson (American football) (1887–1950), American football coach in the United States
- Dwight Wilson (veteran) (1901–2007), second-to-last surviving Canadian veteran of the First World War
- Dwight Hillis Wilson, African-American archivist, researcher, and teacher
