= John Menard =

John Menard may refer to:

- John Menard Jr. (born 1940), businessman
- John Willis Menard (1838–1893), politician
