= Mifflin Wistar Gibbs =

American civil rights activist, businessman, and politician (1823–1915)

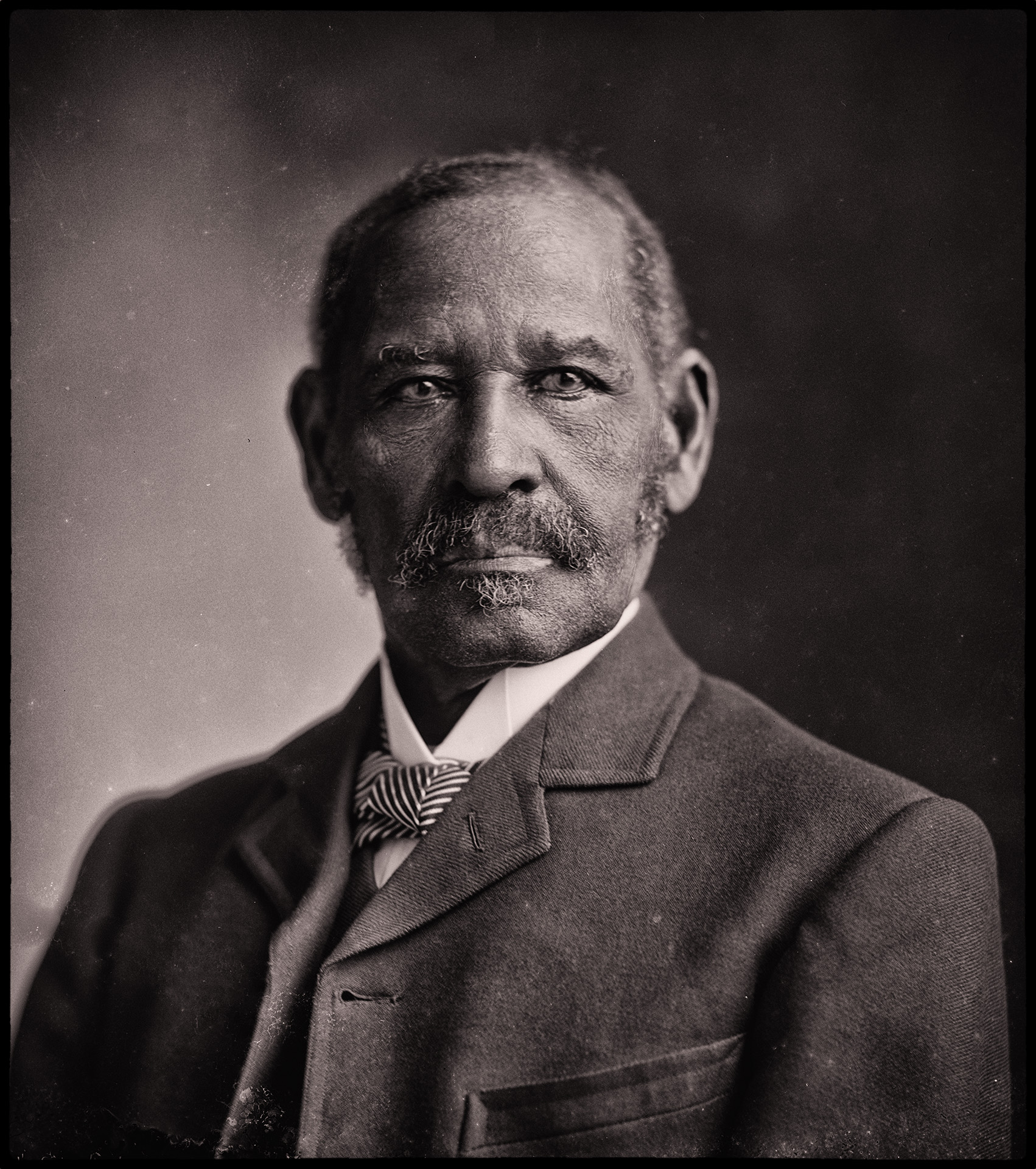
- Gibbs in 1902
- Born: April 17, 1823; Philadelphia, Pennsylvania, U.S.
- Died: July 11, 1915 (aged 92); Little Rock, Arkansas, U.S.
- Resting place: Oakland-Fraternal Cemetery
- Other name: M. W. Gibbs
- Occupations: Businessman, newspaper publisher, lawyer, judge, diplomat, banker, real estate investor
- Political party: Republican
- Spouse: Maria Ann Alexander Gibbs
- Children: Donald Francis Gibbs (1860–1906) Ida Alexander Gibbs (1862–1957); Horace E. Gibbs (1863–1956); Wendall D. Gibbs (1865–1885) Harriet Gibbs Marshall (1868–1941)
- Relatives: Brother, Jonathan Clarkson Gibbs

Mifflin Wistar Gibbs (April 17, 1823 – July 11, 1915) was an American-born politician, businessman, newspaper publisher, and advocate for black rights in both the United States and Canada. He moved to California as a young man, during the Gold Rush, and was an early black pioneer in San Francisco. Gibbs co-founded the first black newspaper in California and was an active leader in the early California State Convention of Colored Citizens.

Angered by discriminatory laws passed in California in 1858, he led a migration of African Americans that year to Victoria, British Columbia, Canada during the Fraser Canyon Gold Rush, and he worked in Victoria for ten years. Gibbs became the first black person elected to public office in British Columbia on November 16, 1866, upon winning a seat on the Victoria City Council.

After the American Civil War, Gibbs and many of the other black settlers returned to the United States. In the late 1860s, he settled in Arkansas's capital city of Little Rock, and he became an attorney. He was active in Reconstruction politics. In 1873, Gibbs became the first black judge elected in the United States. In 1897, during the William McKinley administration, he was appointed as American consul to Madagascar.

== Early life ==
Mifflin Wistar Gibbs was born on April 17, 1823, in Philadelphia, Pennsylvania. Gibbs was the second of four siblings, the eldest being his brother Jonathan Clarkson Gibbs. Their father was a Methodist minister.

As a young adult, Gibbs became active in the abolitionist movement and worked for Frederick Douglass. He was also involved in the Philomathean Society of Philadelphia, a literary organization which included Douglass, Charles Burleigh Purvis, William Whipper, and Izaiah Weir. Philadelphia had long had a flourishing free black community, as people had found work there even before the revolution and slavery was abolished after the American Revolutionary War.

== San Francisco, California ==
Like tens of thousands of other men, Gibbs joined the California Gold Rush, having arrived in San Francisco in late 1850. He sought work as a carpenter, a trade that he had pursued in Philadelphia, but was discouraged by the racial discrimination that he faced. He then partnered with Nathan Pointer to sell clothes. In 1851, Gibbs, in partnership with Peter Lester, opened the Emporium for Boot and Shoes store at 638 Clay Street in San Francisco, selling imported shoes and boots. In Gibbs's autobiography, "Shadow and Light" (1902), he mentions that, while living in San Francisco, he and Lester were successful in business but dealt with community ostracization and assaults. As African Americans in California, they were disenfranchised and thus unable to sit on a jury, unable to testify in court, and denied the right to vote.

According to Gibbs's memoir, he publicly protested these unjust laws as early as 1851, when he joined with Jonas H. Townsend, W. H. Newby, and William H. Hall to publish resolutions decrying their disenfranchisement and limited testimony rights in the Alta California, then the state's leading newspaper. He was later a proprietor, publisher, and contributor to the Mirror of the Times, "the state's only African-American newspaper." He was active in statewide conventions of Black Californians in the 1850s and, together with Lester, stood against poll taxes in San Francisco.

In 1858, he and other American blacks were angered when the California State Legislature passed discriminatory laws intended to discourage blacks from entering or staying in the state: they were deprived of the right to own property and were disqualified from giving evidence against a white person in court. All black people in California were required to wear distinctive badges. Angered by these developments, Gibbs and two other African-American men went to British Columbia to meet with Sir James Douglas, governor of the province, to learn about the treatment of blacks in Canada. Douglas assured the men that they would be treated like other residents in this frontier area.

== Immigration to Canada ==
Starting in 1858, Gibbs led an estimated six hundred to eight hundred African Americans, many with families, from California to British Columbia, where some settled on Vancouver Island. They comprised a major portion of the early frontier community. Gibbs became a naturalized British citizen in 1861, together with 52 other American blacks from the emigrant group. Gibbs worked as a merchant and also became involved in politics during his ten-year stay in Canada.

In the 1860 Vancouver Island Legislative election, the vote of the black community in the election for the Vancouver Island Legislative Assembly defeated Amor De Cosmos.

=== Victoria City Council ===
Gibbs ran in 1862 in the first race for a Victoria City Council seat; he placed seventh in this race, missing winning a council seat by only four votes. He was elected to Victoria City Council in 1867 and served in that body until 1869.

=== Confederation Movement ===
In 1868, Gibbs was the Salt Spring Island delegate to the Yale Convention, an important step toward British Columbia's decision to join Canada in the confederation.

== Return to United States ==
After about a decade, Gibbs returned to the United States and settled in Little Rock. He read the law to become an attorney and passed the bar examination in 1870. Becoming active in the Republican Party, he was appointed to a number of judicial and government positions, including county attorney of Pulaski County. In 1872, he was a delegate to the National Convention of Colored men in New Orleans, Louisiana. In 1873, Gibbs was elected city judge as a Republican, the first black judge elected in the United States.

In 1876, he was elected president of the National Convention of Colored Men at Nashville, Tennessee, and, in June of that year, he was appointed register of the United States Land Office at Little Rock. He was a delegate to the 1876, 1880 Republican National Convention, and 1884 Republican National Conventions, and was a member of the "immortal 306" who supported Ulysses S. Grant's failed candidacy for a third nomination at the 1880 convention in Chicago, Illinois. In 1882, Gibbs was elected to the Little Rock Bar Association.

He became wealthy through his law practice and real estate investments. In 1897, Gibbs was appointed American consul to Madagascar. As an aide, he hired a friend of his daughter Ida's, William Henry Hunt, whom he mentored. Hunt became the first African American to have a full career as a diplomat for the United States. Gibbs returned to the United States in 1901. He was selected as president of a largely African-American bank in Little Rock.

== Personal life ==
Gibbs was married and had two daughters with his wife, the former Maria Ann Alexander, during the decade in which they lived in British Columbia.

The family relocated to Oberlin, Ohio, in 1869, where both daughters later attended college. Mary Ann had attended Oberlin College from 1852 to 1854. Daughter Ida Alexander Gibbs (1862–1957) earned both bachelor's and master's degrees in English. Her sister, Harriet Gibbs Marshall, went to the Oberlin Music Conservatory, where she completed the equivalent of a bachelor's degree in music in 1889. She became an accomplished concert pianist, author, and educator.

Ida met and became friends with William Henry Hunt, whom Mifflin Gibbs hired as his aide in Tamatave, Madagascar. Hunt was appointed to succeed Gibbs as American consul in Madagascar and had numerous assignments after that. He served until 1932.

In 1902, Gibbs purchased a property at 902 T Street, NW in Washington, D.C., at which his daughter, Harriet Gibbs Marshall, ran the Washington Conservatory of Music, one of the most successful female-owned businesses in the United States at the turn of the 20th century.

Gibbs died at 92 in Little Rock, Arkansas on July 11, 1915. He is buried at Oakland-Fraternal Cemetery.

== Legacy ==
The M. W. Gibbs High School, was a segregated high school for African-American students, and the Gibbs Elementary School was also originally for African-American students, both in Little Rock in Arkansas and named after him. Additionally, the M. W. Gibbs Nursing Home, which was located at 2916 Center Street in Little Rock, was named in his honor.

In 2016, the City of Victoria declared November 19 'Mifflin Wistar Gibbs Day' in recognition of Gibbs becoming the first black person elected to public office in British Columbia. In 2019, a plaque was unveiled in his honor at Irving Park in Victoria, as well as a study room called the 'Mifflin Wistar Gibbs Study Room' in the city's public library.

== Publications ==
- Gibbs, M. W. (1902). Shadow and Light: An Autobiography with Reminiscences of the Last and Present Century. Booker T. Washington (introduction).

== See also ==
- California State Convention of Colored Citizens
- List of African-American jurists
- List of first minority male lawyers and judges in Arkansas
