= David Foote Rivers =

American theologian and politician (1859–1941)

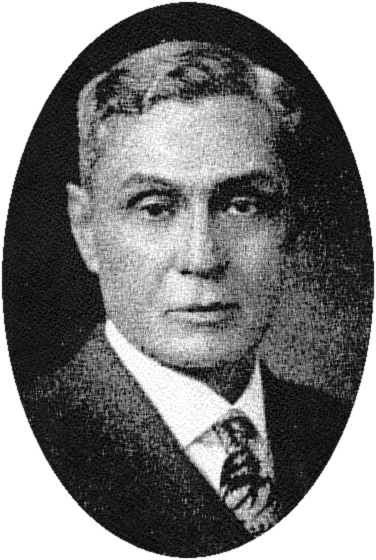

Member of the Tennessee House of Representatives
- In office 1883–1885

Personal details
- Born: July 18, 1859 Montgomery, Alabama
- Died: July 5, 1941 (aged 81) New York, New York
- Resting place: Lincoln Memorial Cemetery; Prince George's County, Maryland
- Spouse: Silene Gale
- Children: 4, including Francis E. Rivers
- Education: Roger Williams University
- Occupation: Politician

David Foote Rivers (July 18, 1859 – July 5, 1941) was a theologian and politician in the United States. An African American and a Republican, he served as a member of the Tennessee House of Representatives from 1883 to 1885, representing Fayette County.

== Biography ==
Rivers was born in Montgomery, Alabama to Edmonia Rivers, a free black woman. His father, who may have been a white man, is not known. They moved to Mississippi and then to Fayette County, Tennessee. Rivers did not learn to write until the age of nineteen. He received a Peabody Scholarship which allowed him to attend Roger Williams University, in Nashville, Tennessee. Rivers studied theology and graduated with honors.

His eligibility for office was contested because he studied out of county during the year prior to his election to the Tennessee House of Representatives in 1882. H. C. Jarvis submitted a minority report supporting his eligibility. He was reelected in 1884 and seated in 1885 but was soon forced to flee the county due to rising racist violence.

Rivers moved to Nashville, where there was less racial tension. He taught at his alma mater, Roger Williams University. For a time, he also lived in southern Kentucky while preaching at the Fifth Ward Baptist Church just over the river in Clarksville, Tennessee.

Rivers became the pastor of Metropolitan Baptist Church in Kansas City, Kansas from 1893 to 1898, and he then served as the pastor of Berean Baptist Church in Washington, D.C. from 1898 to 1941. After his death in New York City, he was interred at Lincoln Cemetery near Washington, D.C.

== Family ==
Rivers married Silene Gale (1861–1937) in Davidson County, Tennessee on December 20, 1887. They had three sons and a daughter. Their son Francis E. Rivers served in New York State's General Assembly and was an assistant district attorney and judge. Another son, Mark Edmond Rivers, became a dentist. His son, Mark Edmond Rivers Jr., in turn became one of only five African American graduates of the United States Military Academy during World War II.

== See also ==
- African Americans in Tennessee
- African American officeholders from the end of the Civil War until before 1900
