= Gail Cobb =

American police officer (1950–1974)

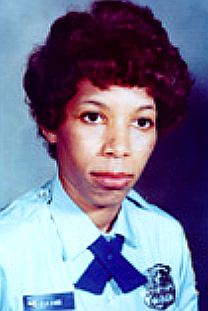
- Born: August 17, 1950; Washington, D.C., U.S.
- Died: September 20, 1974 (aged 24); Washington, D.C., U.S.
- Resting place: Lincoln Memorial Cemetery; 38.856275°N 76.948486°W
- Education: St. Cecilia's Academy
- Police career
- Country: United States
- Allegiance: Washington, D.C.
- Department: Metropolitan Police Department of the District of Columbia
- Service years: October 1973 – September 1974
- Rank: Officer
- Badge no.: 321

Gail Adrienne Cobb (August 17, 1950 – September 20, 1974) was a Black American police officer from Washington, D.C., the first female police officer in the United States shot and killed in the line of duty. She was also the first uniformed female officer of the Metropolitan Police Department of the District of Columbia (MPDC) to have been killed in the line of duty.

== Early life and education ==
Gail Cobb was born in Washington, D.C., on August 17, 1950, the second of five children, and grew up living in a row house near the intersection of 14th and D Streets in Northeast, Washington, D.C. Cobb's family moved to Washington, D.C., in the 1930s. Her father was Clinton Cobb, a correctional Captain for the District of Columbia who applied to the Metropolitan Police Department ("MPDC") in 1953. He was rejected because he was shorter than the mandatory height requirement of 5 feet 8 inches (1.73 m) tall. Cobb's mother, Gloria Cobb, worked as a crossing guard at Kingsman Elementary School when she met Cobb's father at Cardoza High School. Cobb's sister, Denise, became a schoolteacher.

As a child, Cobb attended Catholic elementary school and was described as an average, but creative and energetic student. Then, she attended Elliot Jr. High School, Eastern High School, and St. Cecilia's Academy. Upon graduating St. Cecila's Academy in 1969, Cobb wanted to become a successful fashion designer. However, she had little means and knowledge on how to go about doing so and ended up becoming a telephone operator.

== Personal life ==
At the age of 19, Cobb gave birth to a son, Damon Demetrius Cobb, on February 26, 1970. Her son's father, whom Cobb had met and dated in high school, took no responsibility as a father. Cobb raised their son as a single parent. Damon Demetrius Cobb is currently serving a life sentence in prison at the Western Correctional Institution in Cumberland, Maryland, after being found guilty of first-degree murder in a 1992 killing. Cobb's parents stated in 1996 that they believe his mother's murder (when Damon was 4) deeply influenced his life and led to his legal problems.

== Career ==
In October 1973, Cobb applied to the Metropolitan Police Department of the District of Columbia to become a federal police officer. By that time, the federal government had lowered the mandatory height requirement for police officers to five feet, thus removing a barrier that blocked accepting women as police officers. Gail Cobb was five feet tall. She graduated with her 34-member Metropolitan Police Academy Class in April 1974, of which 13 police cadets were women. At the time, it was the largest graduating class of female police officers in the United States. Gail Cobb was well-liked by her trainers, who noted she was hard-working and committed to serving her community. She spent most of her patrol work on foot and volunteered for police training to get a motorcycle license, in addition to taking night classes to learn sign language.

== Death ==
Murder of Gail Cobb
- Location: 38°54′14″N 77°2′42″W; Vanguard Building (parking garage); 20th and L Streets, Northwest; Washington, D.C., U.S.
- Date: September 20, 1974; 10:30 a.m. (ET)
- Target: Eastern Liberty Federal Savings & Loan; 1170 21st Street, Northwest; Washington, D.C., U.S.
- Attack type: Shooting
- Weapon: Handgun
- Deaths: Gail Cobb
- Perpetrators: John William Bryant (shooter); John Curtis Dortch (accomplice)
- Motive: Bank robbery

At around 10:30 am on September 20, 1974, John Curtis Dortch, a 29-year-old Howard University graduate and former U.S. Army soldier from Silver Spring, Maryland, and John William Bryant, a 24-year-old man from Washington, D.C., began making their way to the Eastern Liberty Federal Savings and Loan bank at 21st and L Streets NW, disguised as construction workers, and each carrying a loaded sawed-off shotgun and handgun. They intended to rob the bank.

Two plainclothes police officers were alerted of the robbery in advance, and saw the two men on the street. The officers stopped them and asked them for identification, before the would-be robbers could even get inside the bank. The two men ran off in separate directions. Cobb, who had graduated from the police academy only six months earlier, was still on probationary duty a block from the bank. Cobb, who was writing a traffic ticket at the time, was told by a citizen that they saw an armed man run into a garage. Cobb followed the suspect and confronted him inside the garage as he was in the process of changing out of his disguise. Cobb ordered the man to place his hands on the wall. As she called for assistance over her radio, the suspect spun around and fired a single gunshot at Cobb at close range. The bullet went through Cobb's wrist, shattering a wristwatch that was given to her by her mother as a birthday present, continued through her police radio, where it then penetrated her heart. Cobb died at the scene at 20th Street and L Street, NW, and responding officers arrested the suspect at the scene.

Gail Cobb served in Washington, D.C., the Nation's Capital, as a uniformed federal police officer of the Metropolitan Police Department for less than one year. She was the first female MPDC officer to be killed in the line of duty, as well as the first African American female law enforcement officer to be killed in the line of duty in the United States. She is buried at Lincoln Memorial Cemetery in Suitland, Maryland, near the border between Washington, D.C., and Prince George's County, Maryland.

=== Funeral ===
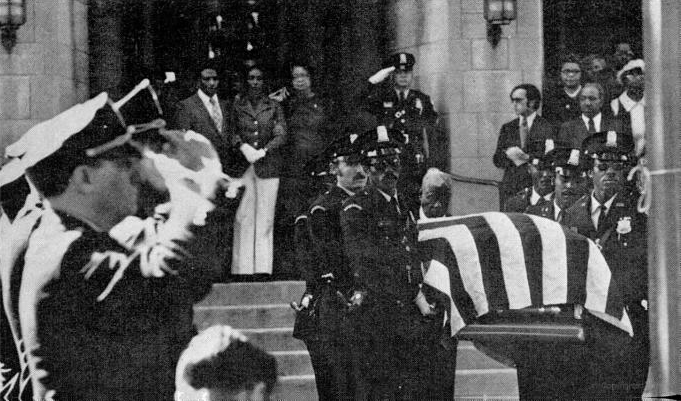
Cobb's casket being carried by pallbearers at her funeral in 1974

Cobb's funeral was ornate and large. Hundreds of police officers lined the street around the funeral venue, some coming all the way from Hawaii, all standing at attention. Cobb was not buried in uniform.

The Mayor of the District of Columbia, dignitaries who attended the funeral, during which the U.S. President Gerald R. Ford who had to be elsewhere at the time, called for a moment of silence.

== Legacy ==
Several weeks after Cobb's funeral, her parents began displaying a photograph of Cobb in her MPDC uniform, her police badge, a record of the music sung at her funeral, proclamations and letters from government officials, the uniform boots that Cobb had been wearing when she died and a letter from the president which commended Cobb for sacrificing her life. Given an entire section all to its own was a letter from U.S. President Gerald Ford, saying that Cobb "has our lasting admiration for the cause of law enforcement and the well-being of our society, a cause for which she made the highest sacrifice."

In 1975, John William Bryant was sentenced to 15 years to life imprisonment after being found guilty by a jury of second-degree murder. He was released on parole in 1992. The following year, in November 1993, he was arrested in Washington, D.C., for possessing crack cocaine and three bags of marijuana. However, a court ruled the cocaine and marijuana impermissible in court as the arresting officers did not have probable cause to believe that Bryant was committing a crime when they discovered them. In July 1997, the D.C. Parole Board revoked Bryant's parole for his possessing marijuana and cocaine, as well as testing positive for marijuana use. Bryant denied ever using marijuana. The D.C. Parole Board decided not to send Bryant back to prison, but rather to send him to an inpatient program for alcoholism treatment, much to the dismay of Cobb's relatives.

In 1996, John Curtis Dortch (born July 19, 1945), who was one of the key architects of the robbery that left Cobb dead, attempted to become a lawyer in West Virginia and Washington, D.C., after finishing a 15-year prison term for his being convicted of second-degree murder on July 30, 1975. After being released from prison on parole in 1989 for "good behavior", Dortch became active in church, helped out an AIDS patient, began tutoring and mentoring children, and started attending law school. Dortch, a graduate of Howard University and a former U.S. Army officer who served in the Vietnam War, was not the triggerman who shot Cobb, however, he attempted to appeal to the courts to allow him to become a lawyer, much to the dismay of Cobb's family and friends. In 1997, the West Virginia Supreme Court denied Dortch permission to practice law in the state in a unanimous 4-0 decision, to the praise of Cobb's surviving family members and friends. Dortch has since written an autobiography of his life, Memoirs of the Prodigal Son: the Road to Redemption, Fifteen Years in Prison and Beyond, released in September 2008.

== See also ==
- List of American police officers killed in the line of duty
