= Francis E. Rivers =

American politician

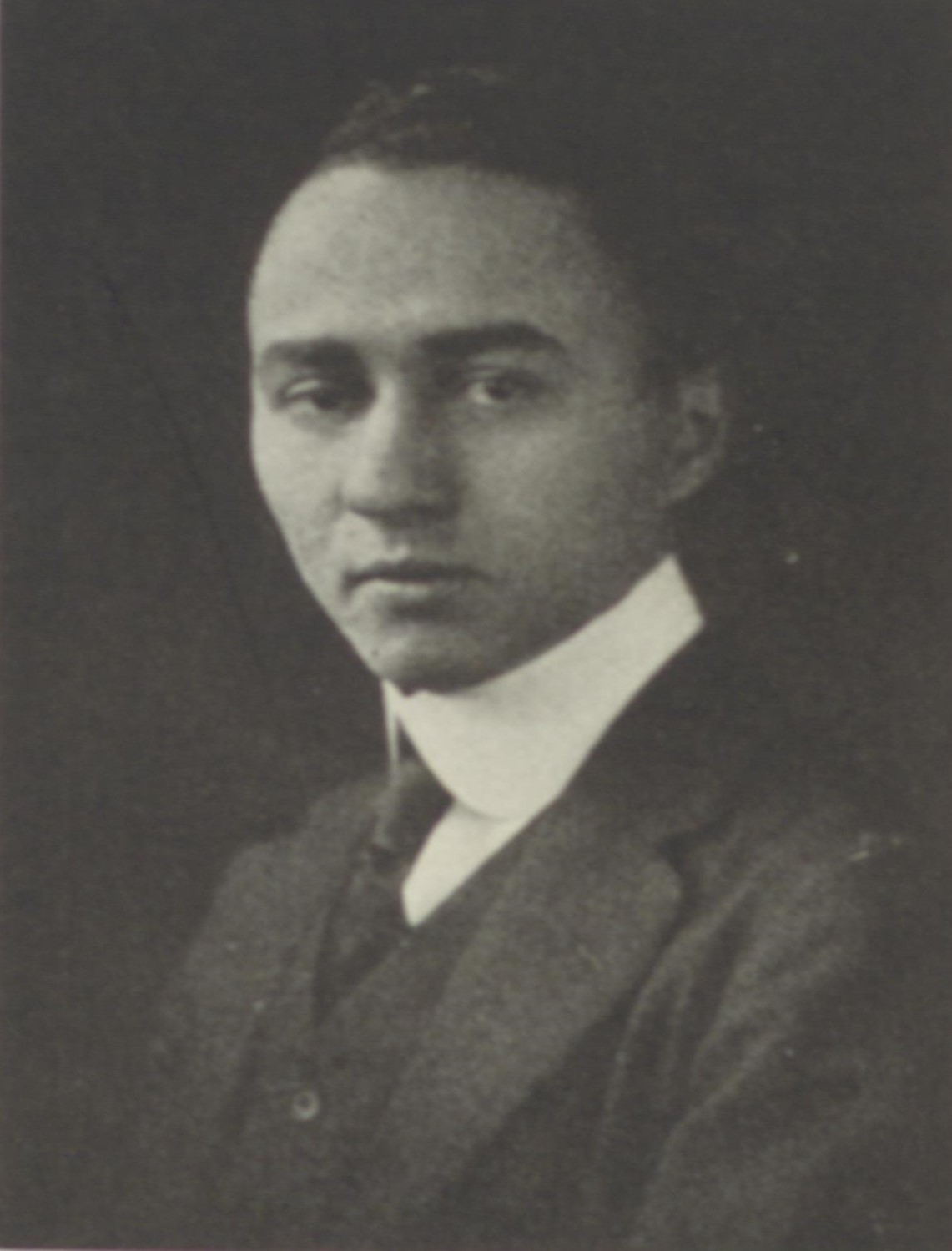
Francis E. Rivers at Yale College

Francis Ellis Rivers (July 30, 1893 – July 28, 1975) was an American lawyer and judge who served in the New York State Assembly. He was a Republican. His father, David Foote Rivers, was a Republican state representative in Tennessee.

== Early life and education ==
Rivers was born on July 30, 1893 in Kansas City, Kansas, where his father was working as a Baptist minister. In 1898, the family moved to Washington, D.C., when his father became pastor of the Berean Baptist Church there. Rivers attended the local schools and graduated from M Street High School in 1910. He then enrolled at Howard University, where his older brother Mark Edmond Rivers was also a student. Francis Rivers transferred to Yale College in 1911, while his brother eventually completed both his A.B. and D.D.S. degrees at Howard.

Rivers graduated Phi Beta Kappa from Yale College with an A.B. degree in 1915. He then enrolled at Harvard Law School, but had to leave in 1916 when tuition funds ran short. Rivers intended to find a job at a munitions plant, but ended up in the 367th Infantry Regiment in France during World War I. He served from October 1917 to May 1919 and was discharged from duty as a first lieutenant. After the war, Rivers won a scholarship to Columbia Law School, completing his LL.B. degree in 1922.

== Career ==
After graduation from law school, Rivers worked for Jonah J. Goldstein until he could establish his own legal practice in 1925. He became the first African American elected to membership in the Association of the Bar of the City of New York.

He defeated incumbent Abraham Grenthal in the 1929 election for state Assembly and served in the 153rd New York State Legislature in 1930. He sponsored a bill to establish a municipal court district in Harlem which was signed into law by Governor Franklin D. Roosevelt. Later in 1930, Rivers was an unsuccessful judicial candidate for this new court, but Charles E. Toney and James S. Watson were elected as the first two black judges in New York state.

In 1932, W. E. B. Du Bois wrote to Rivers seeking information about Dr. W. A. Hinton of Boston, who Du Bois wanted to nominate for a Spingarn Medal.

In 1938, Rivers was appointed as an assistant district attorney by District Attorney Thomas E. Dewey. In November 1942, Judge Goldstein sponsored him for membership in the American Bar Association. In 1943, several prominent members of the Association threatened to quit when Rivers was denied membership in the organization, which did not have any African American members at the time.

In September 1943, Rivers became the first African American to serve on the City Court of New York City (now the New York City Civil Court). Initially appointed to the court, he was elected in November 1943 and re-elected to a second ten-year term in 1953. After the outcry over their membership decision, the American Bar Association changed their rules to prohibit discrimination based on race or religion. Judge Watson was made a member in 1943 and Judge Rivers was accepted in February 1944.

In 1944, Rivers received a University Medal from Columbia University. In 1966, he presented an award to Thurgood Marshall.

Rivers died at Mount Sinai Hospital in Upper Manhattan on July 28, 1975.

== See also ==
- List of African-American jurists
- List of first minority male lawyers and judges in New York

New York State Assembly
Preceded by Abraham Grenthal	New York State Assembly; New York County, 19th District; 1930	Succeeded by James E. Stephens
