= Abraham Grenthal =

American politician

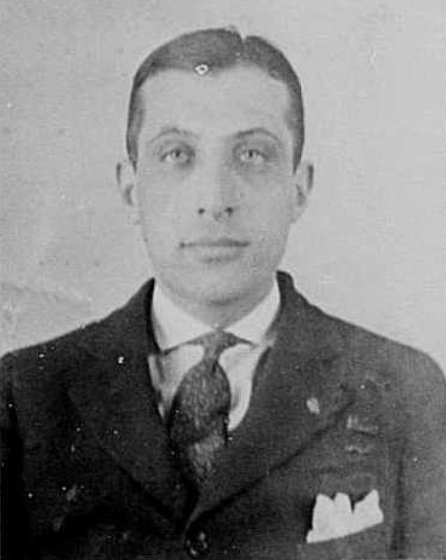
Abraham Grenthal in 1925

Abraham W. Grenthal was an American lawyer who served on the New York Assembly from 1925 to 1929. He was a Republican. He received some pushback from African Americans in the party who wanted their own candidates elected.

Grenthal lost to Francis E. Rivers in 1929.

New York State Assembly
Preceded by James Male	New York State Assembly; New York County, 19th District; 1925-1929	Succeeded by Francis E. Rivers
