= Thomas Van Renssalaer Gibbs =

American politician (1855–1898)

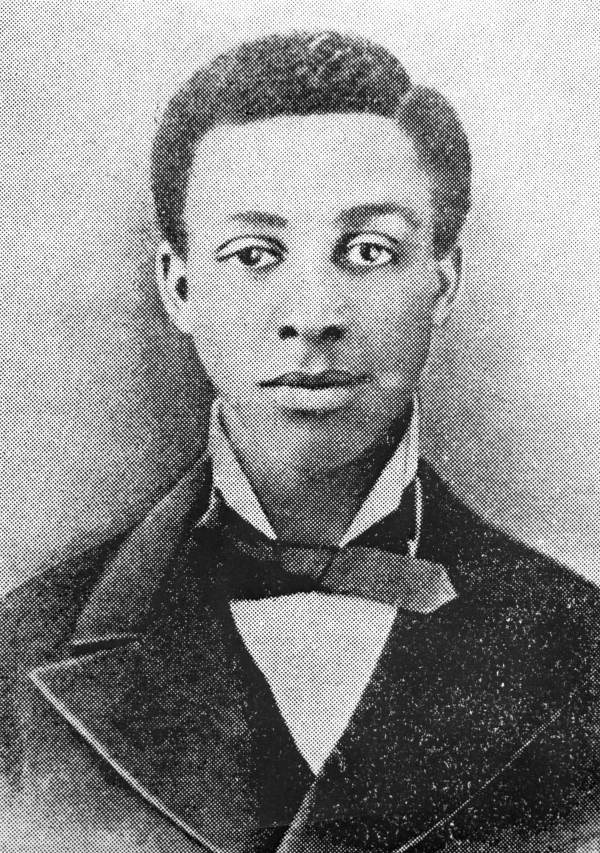

Member of the Florida House of Representatives from the Duval County district
- In office 1885–1887; 1887–1889

Personal details
- Born: September 16, 1855 New York, U.S.
- Died: October 31, 1898 (aged 43) Tallahassee, Florida, U.S.
- Party: Republican
- Spouse: Alice Menard
- Children: 3
- Education: West Point

Thomas Van Renssalaer Gibbs (September 16, 1855 – October 31, 1898) was a member of the 1885 Florida Constitutional Convention, served in the Florida House of Representatives, and was a school administrator. He was nominated to West Point by Representative Josiah T. Walls, who was also African American.

In the legislature, Gibbs helped pass legislation establishing a white normal school in Gainesville, Florida and a "colored school" in Jacksonville. State Normal College for Colored Students was a predecessor of Florida A&M College and was relocated to Tallahassee where it opened in 1887 with 15 students. Gibbs served as its assistant principal and Vice President until his death in 1898. The only son of Jonathan Clarkson Gibbs, Thomas married Alice Menard, the daughter of politician John Willis Menard who in 1868 was the first African American elected to Congress.

== See also ==
- African American officeholders from the end of the Civil War until before 1900
