= Charles H. Wesley =

American historian and academic

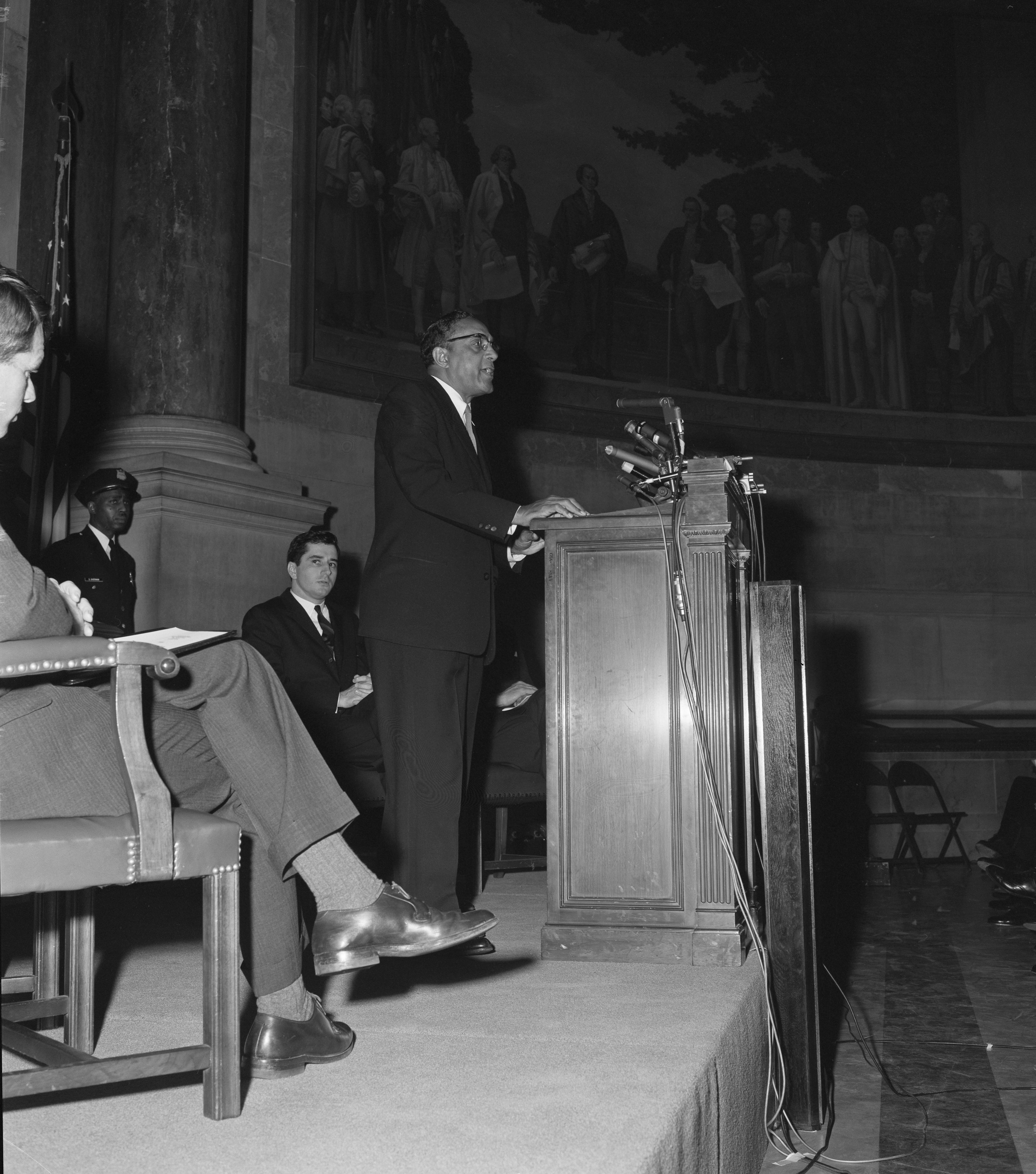
- Charles H. Wesley at the Opening of the Emancipation Proclamation Exhibit
- Born: Charles Harris Wesley; December 2, 1891; Louisville, Kentucky, U.S.
- Died: August 16, 1987 (aged 95); District of Columbia
- Occupations: Historian, Author
- Spouse(s): Louise Johnson (d. 1973); Dorothy B. Porter (1977–1987)
- Children: 2, including Charlotte Wesley Holloman
- Writing career
- Period: 1925–1987
- Genre: History
- Notable works: Prince Hall Life and Legacy

Charles Harris Wesley (December 2, 1891 – August 16, 1987) was an American historian, educator, minister, and author. He published more than 15 books on African-American history, taught for decades at Howard University, and served as president of Wilberforce University, and founding president of Central State University, both in Ohio.

== Early life and education ==
Charles Wesley was born in Louisville, Kentucky, the only child of Matilda and Charles Snowden Wesley. He attended local schools as a boy, and went on to graduate in 1911 from Fisk University, a historically black college in Nashville, Tennessee. He earned a master's degree from Yale University in 1913. Continuing with his graduate work, in 1925, Wesley became the third African American to receive a Ph.D. from Harvard University.

== Career ==
Wesley became an ordained minister of the African Methodist Episcopal Church (AME). He also had an academic career as a professor of history and wrote a total of more than 15 books on African-American history and political science. He was the dean of the Liberal Arts and the Graduate School at Howard University.

He won a Guggenheim Fellowship that enabled him to travel in 1931 to London, England, where on March 31 he was present with Harold Moody at the founding of the League of Coloured Peoples that was inspired in part by the NAACP, of which Wesley was a member.

In 1942 Wesley was called as president of Wilberforce University (an AME-affiliated university) in Wilberforce, Ohio, serving until 1947. That year, he founded Central State University across the street from Wilberforce. He served as its president until 1965, when he returned to Washington, D.C.

That year, Wesley became the director of research and publications for the Association for the Study of Negro Life and History. He was executive director from 1965 to 1972, later becoming Executive Director Emeritus'. In 1976, he became Director of the Afro-American Historical and Cultural Museum in Philadelphia, now known as the African American Museum in Philadelphia. He was also a life member of the American Historical Association.

Wesley was active in African-American fraternal organizations, both during and after college. He was elected as the 14th and a five-term General President, and later National Historian for seven decades, of Alpha Phi Alpha, the first intercollegiate Greek-letter fraternity established by and for African Americans. He wrote The History of Alpha Phi Alpha (1929), updating it in many new editions. Wesley was also an archon of Sigma Pi Phi (the Boule), the first of all Black Greek Letter Organizations (BGLO). He was a Prince Hall Freemason, a Sovereign Grand Inspector General (33rd Degree) of the United Supreme Council (Southern Masonic Jurisdiction of the Scottish Rite, Prince Hall); a member of the Odd Fellows, Elks, and many other fraternal organizations.

Wesley died on August 16, 1987, in Washington, D.C. at 12:35 am. He was buried at Lincoln Memorial Cemetery, Suitland, Maryland.

== Awards ==
He was the recipient of numerous awards and honors, including:

- Guggenheim Fellowship in 1930/31
- Phi Beta Kappa Key in 1953
- Scottish Rite Gold Medal Award in 1957
- Amistad Award in 1972
- Honorary doctorates from numerous universities, including Wilberforce University in 1928

== Books ==
=== African-American history ===
- Negro Labor in the United States, 1850–1925 (1927)
- Richard Allen, Apostle of Freedom (1935)
- The Collapse of the Confederacy (1937)
- The Negro in the Americas (1940)
- A Brief History of 75 Years of Negro Progress with John C. Dancy (1940)
- Negro Makers of History (5th edition) with Carter G. Woodson (1958)
- The Story of the Negro Retold with Carter G. Woodson (1959)
- The Negro in Our History with Carter G. Woodson (1962)
- Ohio Negroes in the Civil War (1962)
- Neglected History: Essays in Negro History (1965)
- Negro Americans in the Civil War: From Slavery to Citizenship (1967)
- International Library of Negro Life and History, a ten volume set (1967).
- In Freedom's Footsteps: From the African Background to the Civil War (1968)
- The Quest for Equality: From Civil War to Civil Rights (1968)
- Negro Citizenship in the United States: The Fourteenth Amendment and the Negro-American, Its Concepts and Developments, 1868–1968 (1968)
- The Fifteenth Amendment and Black America, 1870–1970 (1970)
- Women Builders with Sadie Iola Daniel and Thelma D. Perry (1970)

=== Greek-letter fraternity ===
- The History of Alpha Phi Alpha: A Development in Negro College Life (1929)
- The History of Sigma Pi Phi (1954)
- Henry Arthur Callis, Life and Legacy (1977)

=== Prince Hall Freemasonry ===
- The History of the Prince Hall Grand Lodge of the Free and Accepted Masons of the State of Ohio 1849–1959: An Epoch in American Fraternalism (1961)
- The History of the Prince Hall Grand Lodge of the Free and Accepted Masons of the State of Ohio 1849–1971: An Epoch in American Fraternalism (1972)
- Prince Hall: A Life and Legacy (1977)

=== Other professional and fraternal organizations ===
- History of the Improved Benevolent and Protective Order of Elks of the World, 1898–1954 (1955)
- The History of the National Association of Colored Women's Clubs: A Legacy of Service (1984).

Preceded by Bert A. Rose	General President of Alpha Phi Alpha; 1932–1940	Succeeded by Rayford Logan
