= John Willis Menard =

American newspaper publisher and politician (1838–1893)

John Menard
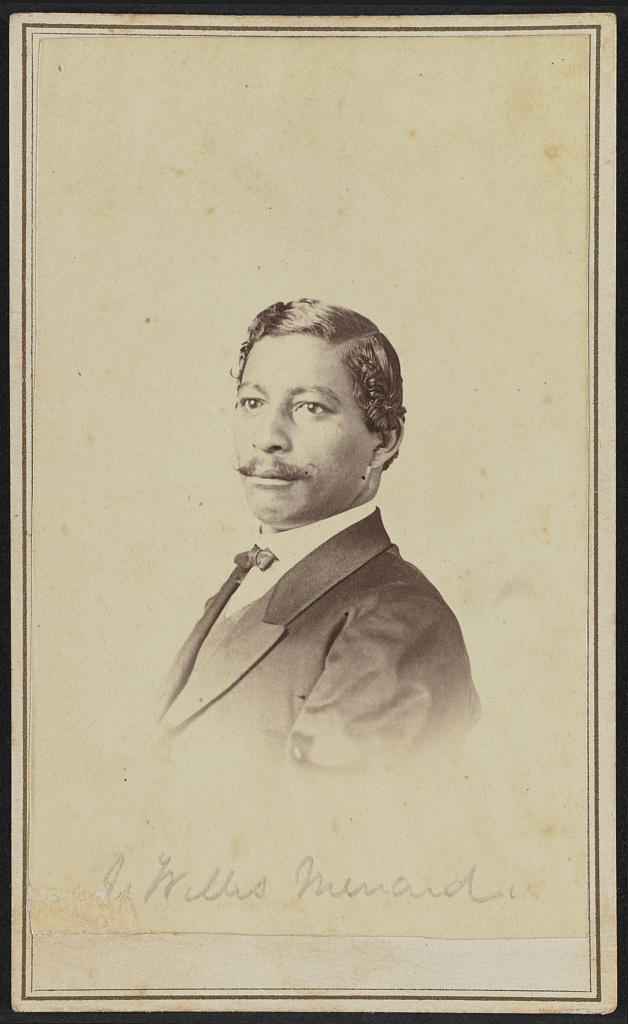

Personal details
- Born: John Willis Menard; April 3, 1838 Kaskaskia, Illinois, U.S.
- Died: October 9, 1893 (aged 55) Washington, D.C., U.S.
- Party: Republican
- Spouse(s): Lucy Samuels (1859–1871 (sep)); Elizabeth Mary
- Children: 2 daughters, 1 son
- Education: Iberia College

John Willis Menard (April 3, 1838 – October 8, 1893) was a federal government employee, poet, newspaper publisher and politician born in Kaskaskia, Illinois to parents who were Louisiana Creoles from New Orleans. After moving to New Orleans, on November 3, 1868, Menard was the first African-American person elected to the United States House of Representatives. His opponent contested his election, and opposition to his election prevented him from being seated in Congress.

== Life and career ==
John Willis Menard was born in 1838 in Kaskaskia in Randolph County in southern Illinois, to parents who were free people of color. They were Louisiana Creoles from New Orleans, of mostly European and some African descent. He may have been related to Michel Branamour Menard, a French-Canadian fur trader and a founder of Galveston, Texas. Menard attended school in Sparta, Illinois and Ohio Central College, then Iberia College in Iberia, Ohio.

Menard married Lucy Samuels on December 30, 1859 in Madison County, Illinois. They had one daughter, Alice, born in 1861. Menard would later separate from his first wife when he traveled to Jamaica and the U.S. Virgin Islands, where he met and married Elizabeth Mary, a union that led to two children.

During the American Civil War, Menard worked as a clerk in the Department of the Interior under President Abraham Lincoln. He was sent to British Honduras in 1863 to investigate a proposed colony for newly freed slaves. After the war, Menard settled in New Orleans.

Menard moved to New Orleans in 1865, establishing the newspaper, The Free South, later named The Radical Standard. In an 1868 special election to fill the unexpired term of James Mann, a Democrat who had died in office, Menard was elected as a Republican to represent Louisiana's 2nd congressional district. He was denied the seat on the basis of an election challenge by the apparent loser, white Democrat Caleb S. Hunt. On February 27, 1869, Menard became the first African American to address the chamber.

When the House Committee on Elections failed to make a final determination on the election challenge, the case went before the entire House of Representatives. On February 27, 1869 it suspended its rules to allow both Menard and Hunt to address the chamber in support of their claims. Only Menard spoke. After Congress debated the issue, neither Menard nor Hunt could gain enough support to be seated. The vote to seat Hunt was 41 in favor to 137 against. Following this was a vote to send the matter back to the Committee on Elections so that it might take testimony on the validity of the election. Before the vote occurred, members amended the resolution so as to seat Menard until the outcome of the investigation. The vote in Menard's favor, to send it back for further investigation and to seat him in the meantime, failed 57 to 130, which meant that the House was not going to continue to investigate. Though the claim circulates that Congressman and future president James A. Garfield purportedly suggested it was too early for an African American to be admitted to Congress, he did not make such a statement to the House when Menard gave his presentation and the roll call shows that he voted to seat Menard. Neither man was seated for the remainder of the final days of the 40th Congress.

Menard moved to Jacksonville, Florida, where he was appointed to the Florida House of Representatives in 1874. He lost the next election, at a time when there was widespread intimidation of voters at elections and white Democratic efforts to suppress black voting. That same year and again in 1877, Menard was elected as a Duval County justice of the peace.

Menard was a poet, the author of Lays in Summer Lands (1879). Menard was also the editor of the Florida News and the Southern Leader from 1882 to 1888.

Menard died in the District of Columbia and is buried at Graceland Cemetery in Washington, D.C. When Graceland closed in 1894, his remains were moved to nearby Woodlawn Cemetery. His daughter, Alice Menard, married Thomas Van Renssalaer Gibbs, the son of Jonathan Clarkson Gibbs.

== See also ==
- List of African-American United States representatives

== Bibliography ==
- "John Willis Menard", John B. Cade Library at Southern University.
- Canter Brown, Jr. Florida's Black Public Officials, 1867–1924. Tuscaloosa and London: The University of Alabama Press, 1998.
- Menard, E. "John Willis Menard: First Negro Elected to U.S. Congress." Negro History Bulletin. 28 (December 1964), 53–54.
- Menard, John Willis. (2006), Encyclopædia Britannica, Retrieved October 19, 2006, from Encyclopædia Britannica Online: http://www.britannica.com/eb/article-9051962
