= Harriet Gibbs Marshall =

African-American musician, writer, and educator

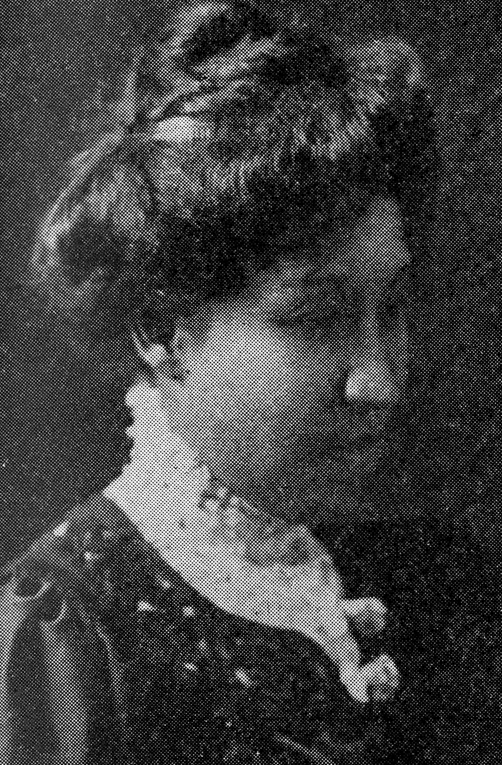
- 1936 photo
- Born: 1868; Victoria, British Columbia
- Died: February 21, 1941 (aged 72–73); Washington, D.C.
- Resting place: Lincoln Memorial Cemetery
- Education: Oberlin Conservatory of Music in Oberlin, Ohio
- Occupations: pianist, writer, educator founder of Washington Conservatory of Music and School of Expression
- Spouse: Napoleon Bonaparte Marshall (married 1906)
- Parent(s): Mifflin Wistar Gibbs; Maria Ann Alexander Gibbs
- Relatives: Sister, Ida Alexander Gibbs

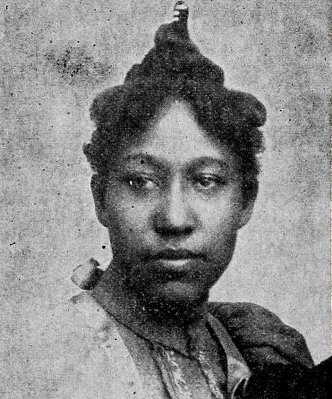
Harriet Gibbs Marshall, from a 1902 publication

Harriet Gibbs Marshall (1868 – February 21, 1941) was an American pianist, writer, and music educator. She opened the Washington Conservatory of Music and School of Expression in 1903 in Washington, D.C.

== Early years ==
Born in Victoria, British Columbia, Harriet Aletha Gibbs was the daughter of Mifflin Wistar Gibbs, a lawyer in Little Rock, Arkansas, who became the first African-American city judge in the United States, and the former Maria Ann Alexander, a school teacher and graduate of Oberlin College. Gibbs was born in Canada. Her father, along with hundreds of others, left California during the Gold Rush because of the race badges they were forced to wear and he decided to move to Victoria where he raised his daughters with his wife, Maria. She had a sister, Ida Alexander Gibbs. Harriet began taking piano lessons with her sister at the age of nine years old. Ida also graduated from Oberlin and pursued a teaching career.

== Education ==
Aged 11, Gibbs began studying at the Oberlin Conservatory while still in high school. She graduated from high school at fifteen and started her collegiate studies at Oberlin. In 1889, Gibbs became the first African-American woman to graduate from Oberlin Conservatory with a Bachelor of Music degree in piano performance. Oberlin was a predominantly white institution and the first to admit black scholars. Her studies of piano, her specialty, continued in the cities of Boston, Chicago, and Paris.

== Career ==
In the last decade of the 19th century, Gibbs appeared in newspapers in Saint Paul, Minnesota, from October and into December 1889. She was recognized for teaching music and was referred to as Hattie A. Gibbs. By 1891, she founded the music program at Eckstein Norton Institute in the rural town of Cane Springs in Kentucky. In 1894 Gibbs played at a recital in Little Rock, Arkansas before an integrated audience.

=== Washington, DC ===
In 1900 Gibbs began to appear in Washington, D.C. newspapers, noted as the first colored graduate of Oberlin. She offered recitals in January 1902 which garnered some praise even from far away, as well as being received at the Bethel Literary and Historical Society, a prominent African-American institution of DC. She took the position of a music supervisor in the then segregated African-American public schools there. She was noted as not approving of ragtime.

At the close of the public school year in May 1903 she was noted in the newspapers presenting a school musicale for Washington Normal School. She founded the Washington Conservatory of Music on October 1, 1903. It focused on classical European music. In May 1904 commencement exercises for Armstrong Normal School were held at which Gibbs presented the school choir noted as assistant director of music for the public schools. The following November Samuel Coleridge-Taylor appeared in the M Street High School with Gibbs presenting the school choir. In Spring 1905 the Conservatory was noted in the newspapers with a concert given by its students – enrollment was noted at over 160. Gibbs kept up her public school duties and led the Banneker Street School musicale in April, as well as for the Wormley School in June. That Fall Gibbs was noted as director of the music among the colored schools of DC as well as president of the Conservatory – and in September Gibbs and friends took a trip to Europe – London, Paris and the countryside of France – joined by her sister, Ida Hunt, noted as the wife of the US consul to Madagascar. On return from her 9-month stay in Europe she noted that colored students attending German or French music schools were well received and noted Hazel Harrison as having had a recent debut with the Berlin Philharmonic Orchestra. Newly married in Spring 1906, Gibbs wed Napoleon Bonaparte Marshall, a graduate of Harvard University (A.B. 1897) and Harvard Law School (J.D. 1900). As was the custom of the time, as a married woman, she at first resigned her employment with the school system, however there was an attempt to withdraw the resignation that failed despite vocal support from an unnamed group of people. The closing of the Conservatory school year had its own recital. On March 3, 1913 she was one of less than 100 black women who bravely marched in the Woman's suffrage parade.

=== Washington Conservatory of Music and School of Expression ===
In the Fall of 1906 advertisements for the Conservatory began calling it the Washington Conservatory of Music and School of Expression with 14 faculty. Newspaper coverage in and beyond DC of the new year noted its history to 1903, that it now had more than 600 students since its founding, and reviewed the faculty in some depth – including staff that would later be officers of the institution as well as her husband. In 1909 Marshall's sister Ida Gibbs Hunt, now noted as the wife of a US Consul to France, stayed with Marshall for the winter as well as their father. In 1910 Illinois federal Representative Martin B. Madden handed out the diplomas for the graduates of the Conservancy. Several columns of the Washington Bee covered the event.

In 1911 advertising for the Conservatory appeared in The Crisis as well as St. Paul newspapers. Marshall also took a trip around promoting the school including to Saint Louis, Missouri, and coverage appeared in The Pittsburgh Courier underscoring its students came from all races and sexes and was called unique for doing so and had now had some 1400 students to date coming from many states though only 23 had stayed on through graduating with a diploma. The Courier coverage also noted scholarships had been given and listed the donors who had covered the scholarships. The officers of the school were noted and included George William Cook of Howard University, and Fisk University graduate and past president of the Bethel Literary and Historical Association, "Lewis" (Louis) G. Gregory, as well as others An elocution program was added. That year's commencement gained additional coverage around the country. That fall she vacationed in New York, and contributed music to the Home and School Association for Normal School No. 2 meeting that winter, followed by a Conservatory recital. Coverage that winter noted a trip to New York and according to The Broad Ax that Marshall was then president of the National Association of Musical and Art Clubs.

Marshall joined Gregory and Cook's wife Coralie from Howard and a faculty of the Conservatory, in the Baháʼí Faith in 1912, while Cook remained friendly to the religion. Marshall hosted Baháʼí events at the Conservatory. In September Marshall took a trip in the West again, this time including Chicago and Detroit. That winter Marshall again vacationed in New York, and the Conservancy produced Gilbert and Sullivan's The Mikado in the Howard Theater. That spring the Conservatory produced a commencement performance where most of the compositions were from the pupils themselves many of whom were colored.

In July 1915 Marshall's father, Judge Mifflin W. Gibbs, died at the age of 93. Process of the inheritance took until 1922.

An October 1915 production of The Star of Ethiopia by W. E. B. Du Bois that presented black history was held in the American League Park – Marshall was among the many who contributed to the music production value of the event via its committee on music. In August 1916 Marshall produced a program on "Negro Folk Songs" at Langston Highschool in Hot Springs, Arkansas. In 1917 Marshall and Gregory were mentioned giving some scholarships.

In 1919 Marshall signed a letter of Baháʼís hoping that ʻAbdu'l-Bahá, then head of the religion, could come back to the West, (recalling the 1910–1913 trips.) In 1920 Marshall began a campaign to raise funds for a national conservancy which would include negro music. In April 1921 the Conservancy produced a program for a fundraiser that covered periods of "negro music and drama" in New York. Marshall returned to the pursuit of a national conservancy in April 1922, calling together various leaders in black music and a follow-up production of the "negro music and drama" was scheduled for May. Walter Damrosch was listed as specifically supporting the idea of the national conservatory. A Conservancy student recital followed in May. Broader recognition of respect for negro music was summarized including Marshall's work in 1922. Marshall was approaching having something for a national conservancy set up in New York by May 1924, but instead she went to Haiti with her husband's work, making a brief return trip in August.

=== Haiti ===
Marshall traveled to Haiti from the mid-1920s when her husband, Captain Marshall of the United States Army, was appointed to a commission to investigate abuses during the United States occupation of Haiti.

During their time in Haiti, the Marshalls were excluded from participation in social activities with other U.S. military officers because of racial segregation. There were occasional trips back to the US such as September–October 1925, and returned by February 1927. Marshall became active with Haitian organizations like Haitian Brotherhood, and was Vice-President of the Organization of Haitian Women. While there, she co-founded the Jean Joseph Industrial School, and held fundraisers for it in the States. Louis G. Gregory thanked Marshall for her letter of introduction for his Baháʼí pioneering to Haiti in 1934 and credited her as a pioneer for the religion ahead of him.

When the Marshalls returned to the United States, they founded the Save Haiti Committee to lobby President Herbert Hoover to remove U.S. soldiers from Haiti. In 1930 Marshall published The Story of Haiti: from the discovery of the island by Christopher Columbus to the present day.

=== Writings ===
In 1932, Marshall contributed a poem Brotherhood published in the Baháʼí news magazine Star of the West. By 1934 Marshall was acknowledged as director of the Conservancy again.

In 1936, Marshall wrote the script for The Last Concerto, a musical spectacle based on the life, love, and music of Samuel Coleridge-Taylor. In 1939 Marshall was among four artists honored at the National Association of Negro Musicians.

== Death and burial ==
Marshall died on February 21, 1941, in Washington, D.C. She bequeathed all her inheritance to the Washington Conservancy.
