= Washington Conservatory of Music and School of Expression =

Former music academy in Washington, D.C., United States

Location
- Washington, D.C. United States; 38.949467°N 77.101746°W

Information
- Type: Private music academy
- Established: 1903
- Founder: Harriet Gibbs Marshall
- Closed: 1960
- Campus: Urban

Washington Conservatory of Music and School of Expression was a private music academy founded by Harriet Gibbs Marshall in 1903 in Washington, D.C. to train African Americans in music. The Conservatory remained open until 1960 making it the longest operating music school for African Americans.

== History and productions ==
After working teaching music in various places in the country Gibbs, not yet married, came to Washington, DC, initially employed in the public school system. She founded the Washington Conservatory of Music in 1903. It focused on classical European music.

In Spring 1905 the Conservatory was noted in the newspapers with a concert given by its students - enrollment was noted at over 160. In the Fall of 1905 Gibbs was noted as director of the music among the colored schools of DC as well as president of the Conservatory - and in September Gibbs and friends took a trip to Europe – London, Paris and the countryside of France – joined by her sister, Ida Hunt, noted as the wife of the US consul to Madagascar. On return from her 9 month stay in Europe she noted that colored students attending German or French music schools were well received and noted Hazel Harrison as had a recent debut with the Berlin Philharmonic Orchestra. Newly married in Spring 1906, Gibbs wed Napoleon Bonaparte Marshall, a graduate of Harvard University (A.B. 1897) and Harvard Law School (J.D. 1900). As was the custom of the time, as a married woman, she at first resigned her employment with the school system, however there was an attempt to withdraw the resignation that failed despite vocal support from an unnamed group of people. The closing of the Conservatory school year had its own recital.

In the Fall of 1906 advertisements for the Conservatory began calling it the "Washington Conservatory of Music and School of Expression" with 14 faculty. Newspaper coverage in and beyond DC of the new year noted its history to 1903, that it now had more than 600 students since its founding, and reviewed the faculty in some depth - including staff that would later be officers of the institution as well as her husband. In 1910 Illinois federal Representative Martin B. Madden handed out the diplomas for the graduates of the Conservancy. Several columns of the Washington Bee covered the event.

In 1911 advertising for the Conservatory appeared in The Crisis as well as St. Paul newspapers. Marshall also took a trip around promoting the school including to Saint Louis, Missouri, and coverage appeared in The Pittsburgh Courier underscoring its students came from all races and sexes and was called unique for doing so and had now had some 1400 students to date coming from many states though only 23 had stayed on through graduating with a diploma. The Courier coverage also noted scholarships had been given and listed the donors who had covered the scholarships. The officers of the school were noted and included George William Cook of Howard University, and Fisk University graduate and past president of the Bethel Literary and Historical Society, "Lewis" (Louis) G. Gregory, as well as others An elocution program was added. That year's commencement gained additional coverage around the country. A Conservatory recital was held in February, 1912. In September Marshall took a trip in the West again, this time including Chicago and Detroit.

The Conservancy produced Gilbert and Sullivan's The Mikado in the Howard Theater in February 1913. That spring the Conservatory produced a commencement performance where most of the compositions were from the pupils themselves many of whom were colored. In December a Baháʼí meeting was hosted at the conservancy - attending included Laura Clifford Barney and her husband, Charles Mason Remey and others.

In 1917 Marshall and Gregory were mentioned giving some scholarships.

In 1920 Marshall began a campaign to raise funds for a national conservancy which would include negro music. In April 1921 the Conservancy produced a program for a fundraiser that covered periods of "negro music and drama" in New York. Marshall returned to the pursuit of a national conservancy in April 1922, calling together various leaders in black music and a followup production of the "negro music and drama" was scheduled for May. Walter Damrosch was listed as specifically supporting the idea of the national conservatory. A Conservancy student recital followed in May. Broader recognition of respect for negro music was summarized including Marshall's work in 1922. Marshall was approaching having something for a national conservancy set up in New York by May 1924, but instead she went to Haiti with her husband's work, making a brief return trip in August, as he was appointed to a commission to investigate abuses during the United States occupation of Haiti. They returned by February 1927. By 1934 Marshall was acknowledged as director of the Conservancy again.

Marshall died on February 21, 1941, in Washington, D.C. She bequeathed all her inheritance to the Washington Conservancy.
