= Charlotte Wesley Holloman =

American soprano

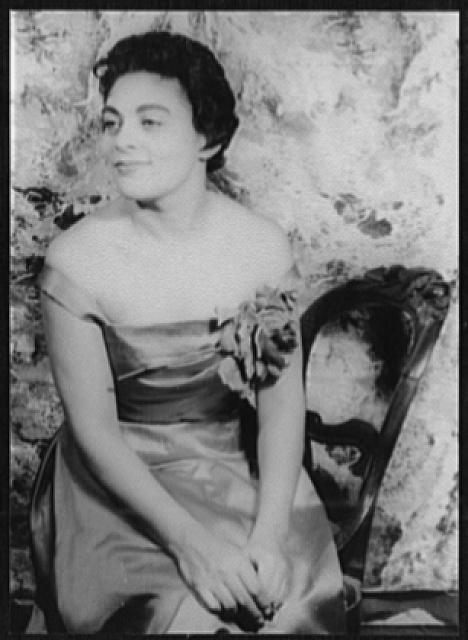
- A 1957 portrait of Charlotte Holloman by Carl Van Vechten, from the Library of Congress
- Born: March 24, 1922; Georgetown, Washington, D.C., US
- Died: July 30, 2015 (aged 93); Washington, D.C., US
- Occupations: Soprano singer, music educator, Broadway performer
- Parent: Charles H. Wesley

Charlotte Wesley Holloman (March 24, 1922 – July 30, 2015) was an American soprano singer.

== Early life ==
Charlotte Wesley was born in Georgetown, Washington, D.C., the daughter of Charles Harris Wesley and Florence Louise Johnson Wesley. Her father was a historian and a college professor; her mother was an English teacher. She was raised in the Washington, D.C. area, but spent some of her childhood in England, while her father was on a Guggenheim Fellowship there. She graduated from Dunbar High School in 1937. She studied music at Howard University, where Camille Nickerson, Hazel Harrison, and Todd Duncan were among her instructors. She was a member of Delta Sigma Theta.

She continued her voice studies through the 1940s and 1950s. Holloman earned a Master of Arts in Voice and Music Education from Columbia University in 1943. In 1961 she held a Rockefeller Foundation grant to pursue vocal studies in Europe.

== Career ==
Holloman made her professional stage debut in 1950, at the Circle-in-the-Square Theatre, in a musical drama, The Barrier. (She also appeared in the revival of The Barrier in 1961.) In 1952 she appeared in My Darlin' Aida and the Broadway revival of Shuffle Along. In 1954 she gave her first professional recital at New York's Town Hall arts venue. The New York Times reviewer noted afterward that "Miss Holloman demonstrated a vocal range and facility nothing short of phenomenal," and "She executed staggeringly difficult arias as casually as if they were Marchesi vocalises". She toured in the United States in 1955, and appeared in Canada in 1957. In 1956, she sang at a concert in memory of composer Harry Burleigh, at Carnegie Recital Hall. In 1967, she sang at a benefit concert in tribute to Philippa Duke Schuyler at the Town Hall venue.

Holloman moved into opera roles in her forties, singing with opera companies in Essen and Saarbrücken. She appeared in The Magic Flute, Tosca, Madama Butterfly, Das Rheingold, and many other operas, and toured with Todd Duncan and Margaret Bonds in the Bahamas. She taught voice at Howard University in her later years, and was an adjunct instructor at several other schools in the Washington area. She also taught private voice lessons from her own studio.

== Personal life ==
Charlotte Wesley married a doctor, John L. S. Holloman Jr. in 1944. They had a daughter, Charlotte, and a summer home on Martha's Vineyard. They divorced before 1965. Charlotte Wesley Holloman died in 2015, aged 93 years, from breast cancer, at a nursing home in Washington, D.C. Her papers are in George Washington University's Gelman Library, part of the District of Columbia Africana Archives Project.
