= Dwight Hillis Wilson =

American educator (1909–1962)

Dwight Hillis Wilson Sr. (October 18, 1909 – March 27, 1962) was an American archivist, researcher, and teacher. He was the first archivist of Fisk University.

== Personal life ==
Wilson was born on October 18, 1909, in Raleigh, North Carolina. His father, a Methodist minister, was also born in South Carolina while his mother came from Pennsylvania.

On June 12, 1935, he and his wife, Gheretein Ridgeley, were married in Washington, D.C. They had one son, Dwight Hillis Wilson Jr.

== Career ==
Wilson earned his degrees from Kittrell College, Shaw University, and Howard College (now University). For his master's thesis, the subject was "Shelley as Revolutionist." He was also awarded with a Doctor of Letters degree from Allen University in 1939. On May 9, 1931, Wilson and 8 others were inducted into Alpha chapter of Omega Psi Phi fraternity as Neophytes.

After his schooling, he taught at Morris Brown College from 1935-1936, before becoming the first archivist of Fisk University. After World War II, he was a member of the Allied Force Records Administration and worked in Caserta and Rome. His colleague, Ken Manden, recalled that Wilson was courageous and "always held his own—no mean feat for any archivist under such circumstances but, if I may say so, a remarkable one for an American Negro confronting what may have seemed to him to be a devious politico-military cabal." He was also a prominent member of the Society of American Archivists and served as Chair on the Committee on College and University Archives. He was the first African American to chair an SAA Committee. In 1949, Wilson was awarded the Certificate of Recognition of the National Urban League for "outstanding achievement in archival work."

Wilson wrote several articles for books and journals throughout his life, especially The American Archivist. One of his better-known works is the article "No Ivory Tower: The Administration of a College or University Archives," published in July 1952 through the Association of College & Research Libraries, a division of the American Library Association.

== Death ==
Wilson died on March 27, 1962, due to an illness he had had since childhood, in Washington, D.C. He was buried in Washington, D.C. three days later. His wife, Gheretein, wrote a pamphlet after his death, stating that Wilson "opened up new dimensions of mind and spirit for many people...He was as proud of the blistering letter he wrote condemning plans to build a dog pound on a lot earmarked for a school as he was of a poem or an article." He was buried in Lincoln Memorial Cemetery.
