= George William Cook =

American educator and instructor (1855-1931)

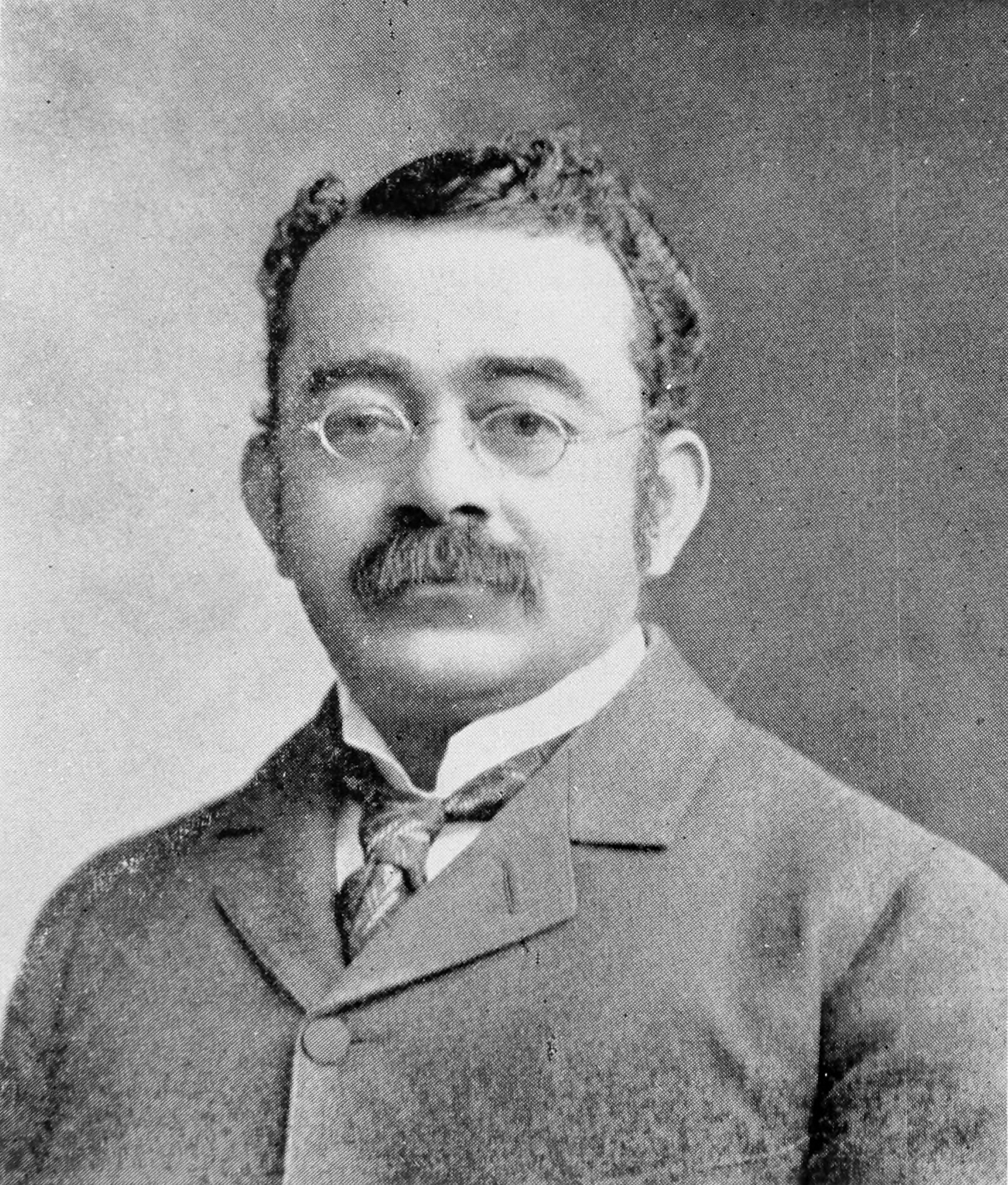
- Born: January 7, 1855; Winchester, Virginia
- Died: August 20, 1931; Philadelphia, Pennsylvania
- Education: Howard University Liberal Arts, and Law
- Spouse: Coralie Franklin Cook
- Children: George William Cook Jr.

George William Cook (January 7, 1855 – August 20, 1931) was an American educator who served as instructor, dean, alumni secretary and manager at Howard University. Born a slave in Winchester, Virginia, he was one of 8 children of Eliza and Peyton Cook. He graduated from the university, as a student of both the liberal arts college, and the law school. His career spanned fifty-eight of the first sixty-six years of Howard University's history.

He also served on the executive board of Directors of the Washington, DC NAACP from its inception until his death, which occurred in Philadelphia.
