= Ida Gibbs =

American rights activist (1862–1957)

Ida Alexander Gibbs Hunt
- Born: Ida Alexander Gibbs; November 16, 1862; Victoria, British Columbia, Canada
- Died: December 19, 1957 (aged 95); Washington, D.C.
- Resting place: Lincoln Memorial Cemetery
- Education: Oberlin College
- Occupations: Educator, Civil Rights Activist, & Pan-Africanist
- Spouse: William Henry Hunt (m. 1904)
- Relatives: Father, Mifflin Wistar Gibbs; Sister, Harriet Gibbs Marshall

Ida Alexander Gibbs Hunt (November 16, 1862 – December 19, 1957) was an advocate of racial and gender equality and co-founded one of the first YWCAs in Washington, D.C., for African-Americans in 1905. She was the daughter of Judge Mifflin Wistar Gibbs, the wife of William Henry Hunt, and a longtime friend of W. E. B. Du Bois. Along with Du Bois, she was a leader of the early Pan-African movement.

== Early life and education ==
Ida's father, Judge Mifflin Wistar Gibbs, was one of the wealthiest African-Americans in the United States in the late nineteenth century. Before he acquired wealth, he and his wife, Maria Ann Alexander Gibbs, traveled from Pennsylvania to California and finally to Vancouver Island where Ida Alexander Gibbs Hunt was born on November 16, 1862, in Victoria, British Columbia. Ten years later, in 1872, the Gibbs family returned to the United States as an affluent family. The third child of five siblings, Ida was the eldest daughter. One of her sisters was Harriet Gibbs Marshall.

At Oberlin College, she completed a classical and scientific academic course in the Department of Philosophy and the Arts. She was a part of the first class of black women to graduate from the school in 1884 alongside Mary Church Terrell and Anna Julia Cooper. They counted among the first-generation of African-American women to graduate from a university. Gibbs was also elected president of the Oberlin Literacy Society. In 1892, she received a masters of arts degree. Oberlin College was the first college to accept and treat equally African-American men and all women.

== Career and activism ==
=== Teaching ===
Gibbs taught Latin and mathematics before her marriage. She had to leave her teaching job upon marriage because until 1920, married women in the public school system in Washington, D.C., were forced to stop working.

As a teacher, Gibbs taught English at Alabama Agricultural and Mechanical College in Normal, Alabama. She also taught at Florida A&M University in Tallahassee, Armstrong Manual Training High School in Washington, D.C., and M Street High School, a prestigious African-American college preparatory school in Washington, D.C. In the 1920s, M Street High School, later renamed Dunbar High School, had four African-American women who had doctorates, Ida Gibbs being one of them, which brought a lot of attention to the school.

On April 12, 1904, Gibbs married the diplomat William Henry Hunt at #14 N Street, NW in Washington, D.C. After she married, she left her career as an educator to join her husband in various consular postings abroad.

=== Diplomat's wife ===
After her marriage, Gibbs Hunt accompanied her husband on his diplomatic assignments, including to Liberia, France, Madagascar, and Guadeloupe. Through her travels with her husband, Gibbs Hunt developed an international perspective on racial justice. Her time abroad exposed her to parallels between the African-American struggle in the United States and the struggles faced by African peoples in colonized territories.

=== YWCA and Red Cross work ===
Gibbs Hunt pursued her civil activism in a variety of ways. Promoting black education, civil rights, and woman's suffrage, Gibbs Hunt made her mark as an educator and Pan-Africanist. Between 1905 and 1907, Gibbs Hunt returned to the United States and endorsed Washington, D.C.'s new Young Women's Christian Association (YWCA). She organized the first Young Women's Christian Association (YWCA) for black women and became a board member of the Phyllis Wheatley YWCA. In 1906, while attending the National Association of Colored Women (NACW) conference in Detroit, Michigan, Gibbs Hunt described how African women responded to Belgian colonists in the Congo. During World War I, Gibbs Hunt was active in the French Red Cross where she aided Belgian refugees and visited wounded Allied soldiers.

After World War I, Gibbs began to write for The Crisis under the pen name Iola Gibson.

=== Pan Africanism ===
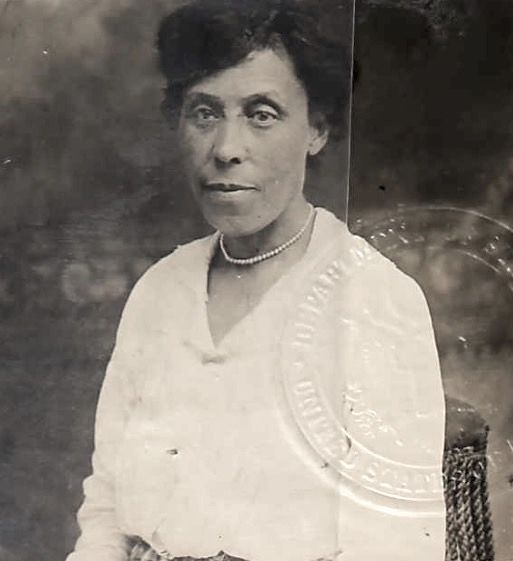
Ida Alexander Gibbs Hunt, 1918

The Paris Peace Conference marked beginning of Gibbs Hunt's political leadership beyond her role as a diplomat's wife. Internationally, she helped support W.E.B. DuBois in organizing many Pan-African Congresses beginning in 1919. Gibbs encouraged W.E.B. Du Bois to come to France where she was living in order to advocate for global racial equality in the peace negotiations. Gibbs Hunt likely introduced Du Bois to black, French legislator, Blaise Diagne, who pushed the French government for approval of the Pan-African Congress of 1919. W.E.B. DuBois relied on Gibbs Hunt for her fluency in French, her organizational work, and her political connections. Gibbs Hunt acted as the primary translator at the 1919 Paris Pan-African Congress. Her ultimate goal was to unite Africans across the diaspora around a common purpose.

She also advocated for world disarmament and for the appointment of black representatives at the 1923 London Third Pan-African Congress in a paper entitled "The Colored Races and the League of Nations." Along with W.E.B. DuBois, she co-chaired the Conference's Executive Committee.

=== Civil Rights and Women's rights ===
Nationally, she was involved in the Niagara Movement as well as the National Association for the Advancement of Colored People (NAACP). Other organizations Gibbs Hunt was involved in included the Club Franco-Étranger, the Book Lover's Club, the Bethel Literary Society, the Washington Welfare Association, and the Women's International League for Peace and Freedom. Gibbs Hunt, along with other like-minded African-American and African women, fought for racial and gender equality by advocating for a global women's coalition.

Gibbs published articles in the Journal of Negro History and in the Negro History Bulletin including "The Price of Peace" (1938), "Civilization and the Darker Races" (n.d.), and the "Recollection of Frederick Douglas" (1953). Her writing allowed her to share her ideas regarding racial progress and reform that she learned from her experience living on three continents.

== Death and legacy ==
Ida Gibbs Hunt died in Washington, D.C., on December 19, 1957.

Though Du Bois is recognized as the leader of the Pan-African movement, Gibbs Hunt was the major organizer behind the 1919 conference, and an influential member of the Executive Committee in subsequent years.
