= William Henry Hunt (diplomat) =

American diplomat (1863–1951)

William Henry Hunt, Jr.
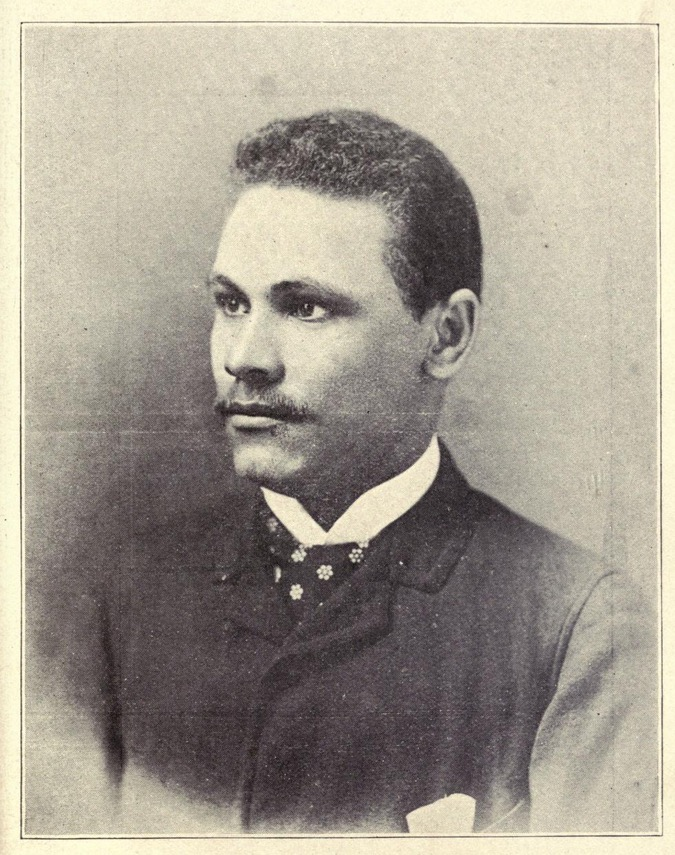
- Born: June 29, 1869; Nashville, Tennessee
- Died: December 19, 1951 (aged 82); Washington, D.C.
- Resting place: Lincoln Memorial Cemetery (Suitland, Maryland, USA)
- Education: Williams College
- Occupation: Diplomat
- Spouse: Ida Alexander Gibbs
- Relatives: Father-in-law, Mifflin Wistar Gibbs

William Henry Hunt (1869–1951) was an African-American diplomat, one of the few African Americans in the United States diplomatic corps (foreign service) during the 19th century.

Born in Tennessee, Hunt moved north where he was educated at Williams College. He was befriended by Mifflin Wistar Gibbs, who hired him as an aide for his 1897 consular posting in Madagascar. Hunt was appointed to succeed Gibbs there and went on to serve at posts in France, Portugal, Guadeloupe and Liberia, retiring in 1932. He settled in Arkansas, where he became active in law and politics.

== Life ==
William Hunt was born in 1869 in Tennessee. He was of mixed heritage, as was his mother, whose father is believed to be a white planter who served as vice president. Through a series of lucky encounters, he acquired a patron and was educated at Lawrence Academy in Massachusetts. He enrolled as one of three African-American students at Williams College in Massachusetts in the 1880s.

During this period, he met his future wife, Ida Alexander Gibbs around 1889. She introduced him to her father, Mifflin Wistar Gibbs, a judge who was appointed as United States Consul to Madagascar in 1897 and hired Hunt as his aide.

In 1904, Hunt married Ida Alexander Gibbs (1862–1957) at #14 N Street, NW in Washington, D.C. She had been educated at Oberlin College and was a friend and colleague of W. E. B. Du Bois. Ida Gibbs Hunt and Du Bois worked together on the Pan-African Congresses held in Europe in the 1910s and 1920s. In 1923 in London, she gave a talk on "The Colored Races and the League of Nations."

Hunt served in the United States diplomatic corps, becoming the vice-consult of Madagascar in 1899 and succeeding his father-in-law as the consul in 1901. His next post was Saint-Etienne, France, where he was consul from 1906 to 1927. During his time there, Hunt gained a high standing among the locals for his diplomatic engagement and athletic activities, particularly through his role in establishing the sport of rugby in the town and running a rugby club. During World War I, he was responsible for the safety of American citizens as well as those of the Central Powers while the United States remained neutral. He would then serve in Guadeloupe, Portugal (the Azores) and Liberia before retiring in 1932. His later career included law and politics in Arkansas.

Claude McKay refers in his Harlem Renaissance novel Banjo (1929) to a "Negroid" consul working at an American consulate in a "town near Lyon," France (likely intended to refer to Hunt).
