= Senator Gilchrist =

Senator Gilchrist may refer to:

- Alfred J. Gilchrist (1872–1931), New York State Senate
- Fred C. Gilchrist (1868–1950), Iowa State Senate
