= 139th New York State Legislature =

New York state legislative session

←	138th	140th	→
- New York State Capitol (2009)

Overview
- Legislative body: New York State Legislature
- Jurisdiction: New York, United States
- Term: January 1 – December 31, 1916

Senate
- Members: 51
- President: Lt. Gov. Edward Schoeneck (R)
- Temporary President: Elon R. Brown (R)
- Party control: Republican (34-17)

Assembly
- Members: 150
- Speaker: Thaddeus C. Sweet (R)
- Party control: Republican (96-52-1-1)

Sessions
- 1st: January 5 – April 20, 1916

The 139th New York State Legislature, consisting of the New York State Senate and the New York State Assembly, met from January 5 to April 20, 1916, during the second year of Charles S. Whitman's governorship, in Albany.

== Background ==
Under the provisions of the New York Constitution of 1894, re-apportioned in 1906 and 1907, 51 Senators and 150 assemblymen were elected in single-seat districts; senators for a two-year term, assemblymen for a one-year term. The senatorial districts were made up of entire counties, except New York County (twelve districts), Kings County (eight districts), Erie County (three districts) and Monroe County (two districts). The Assembly districts were made up of contiguous area, all within the same county.

At this time there were two major political parties: the Republican Party and the Democratic Party.

== Elections ==
The 1915 New York state election was held on November 2. No statewide elective offices were up for election. The voters rejected all amendments proposed by the Constitutional Convention of 1915.

== Sessions ==
The Legislature met for the regular session at the State Capitol in Albany on January 5, 1916; and adjourned on April 20.

Thaddeus C. Sweet (R) was re-elected Speaker, with 94 votes against 45 for Joseph M. Callahan (D).

On February 8, the Legislature elected three Regents of the University of the State of New York: William Berri to fill the vacancy caused by the death of St. Clair McKelway, for a term to end on April 1, 1917; James Byrne to fill the vacancy caused by the death of Andrew J. Shipman, for a term to end on April 1, 1920; and Walter Guest Kellogg for a term of twelve years, beginning on April 1, 1916.

The Legislature enacted a new apportionment of Senate districts, and the number of assemblymen per county, which became law with the approval by the governor on May 1. The new apportionment was declared unconstitutional by the New York Court of Appeals in July 1916, and the 1916 New York state election, was held under the apportionment of 1907.

== State Senate ==
=== Districts ===
- 1st District: Nassau and Suffolk counties
- 2nd District: Queens County, i.e the Borough of Queens
- 3rd, 4th, 5th, 6th, 7th, 8th, 9th and 10th District: Parts of Kings County, i.e. the Borough of Brooklyn
- 11th, 12th, 13th, 14th, 15th, 16th, 17th, 18th, 19th and 20th District: Parts of New York County, i.e. the Borough of Manhattan
- 21st and 22nd District: Parts of Bronx County, i.e. the Borough of the Bronx
- 23rd District: Richmond and Rockland counties
- 24th District: Westchester County
- 25th District: Orange and Sullivan counties
- 26th District: Columbia, Dutchess and Putnam and counties
- 27th District: Greene and Ulster counties
- 28th District: Albany County
- 29th District: Rensselaer County
- 30th District: Saratoga and Washington counties
- 31st District: Montgomery, Schenectady and Schoharie counties
- 32nd District: Lewis, Fulton, Hamilton and Herkimer counties
- 33rd District: Clinton, Essex and Warren counties
- 34th District: Franklin and St. Lawrence counties
- 35th District: Jefferson and Oswego counties
- 36th District: Oneida County
- 37th District: Chenango, Madison and Otsego counties
- 38th District: Onondaga County
- 39th District: Broome and Delaware counties
- 40th District: Cayuga, Cortland and Seneca counties
- 41st District: Chemung, Schuyler, Tioga and Tompkins counties
- 42nd District: Ontario, Wayne and Yates counties
- 43rd District: Steuben and Livingston counties
- 44th District: Allegany, Genesee and Wyoming counties
- 45th and 46th District: Monroe County
- 47th District: Niagara and Orleans counties
- 48th, 49th and 50th District: Erie County
- 51st District: Cattaraugus and Chautauqua counties

=== Members ===
The asterisk (*) denotes members of the previous Legislature who continued in office as members of this Legislature.

Note: For brevity, the chairmanships omit the words "...the Committee on (the)..."

District	Senator	Party	Notes
1st	George L. Thompson*	Republican	
2nd	Bernard M. Patten*	Democrat	
3rd	Thomas H. Cullen*	Democrat	
4th	Charles C. Lockwood*	Republican	Chairman of Public Education
5th	William J. Heffernan*	Democrat	
6th	William B. Carswell*	Democrat	
7th	Daniel J. Carroll*	Democrat	
8th	Alvah W. Burlingame Jr.*	Republican	Chairman of Revision
9th	Robert R. Lawson*	Republican	Chairman of Printed and Engrossed Bills
10th	Alfred J. Gilchrist*	Republican	Chairman of Commerce and Navigation
11th	Christopher D. Sullivan*	Democrat	on November 7, 1916, elected to the 65th U.S. Congress
12th	Henry W. Doll*	Democrat	
13th	Jimmy Walker*	Democrat	
14th	James A. Foley*	Democrat	
15th	John J. Boylan*	Democrat	
16th	Robert F. Wagner*	Democrat	Minority Leader
17th	Ogden L. Mills*	Rep./Progr.	
18th	William M. Bennett*	Rep./Progr.	
19th	George W. Simpson*	Democrat	
20th	Irving J. Joseph*	Democrat	
21st	John J. Dunnigan*	Democrat	
22nd	James A. Hamilton*	Democrat	
23rd	George Cromwell*	Republican	
24th	George A. Slater*	Republican	
25th	John D. Stivers*	Republican	Chairman of Military Affairs
26th	James E. Towner*	Republican	Chairman of Insurance
27th	Charles W. Walton*	Republican	
28th	Henry M. Sage*	Republican	Chairman of Finance
29th	George B. Wellington	Republican	elected to fill vacancy, in place of Walter A. Wood Jr.; Chairman of Conservation
30th	George H. Whitney*	Republican	Chairman of Public Health
31st	Arden L. Norton*	Republican	Chairman of Canals
32nd	Franklin W. Cristman*	Republican	Chairman of Privileges and Elections
33rd	James A. Emerson*	Republican	Chairman of Taxation and Retrenchment
34th	N. Monroe Marshall*	Republican	Chairman of Banks
35th	Elon R. Brown*	Republican	Temporary President; Chairman of Rules
36th	Charles W. Wicks*	Republican	
37th	Samuel A. Jones*	Republican	Chairman of Affairs of Villages
38th	J. Henry Walters*	Republican	Chairman of Judiciary
39th	William H. Hill*	Rep./Progr.	
40th	Charles J. Hewitt*	Republican	Chairman of Internal Affairs
41st	Morris S. Halliday*	Republican	Chairman of Penal Institutions
42nd	Thomas B. Wilson*	Republican	Chairman of Agriculture
43rd	Charles D. Newton*	Republican	Chairman of Codes
44th	Archie D. Sanders*	Republican	on November 7, 1916, elected to the 65th U.S. Congress
45th	George F. Argetsinger*	Republican	Chairman of Affairs of Cities
46th	John B. Mullan*	Republican	Chairman of Public Printing
47th	George F. Thompson*	Republican	Chairman of Public Service
48th	Clinton T. Horton*	Republican	Chairman of Civil Service
49th	Samuel J. Ramsperger*	Democrat	
50th	William P. Greiner*	Democrat	
51st	George E. Spring*	Republican	Chairman of Labor and Industry

=== Employees ===
- Clerk: Ernest A. Fay
- Sergeant-at-Arms: Charles R. Hotaling
- Stenographer: John K. Marshall

== State Assembly ==
Note: For brevity, the chairmanships omit the words "...the Committee on (the)..."

=== Assemblymen ===
District		Assemblymen	Party	Notes
Albany	1st	Clarence F. Welsh	Republican	
Albany	2nd	John G. Malone*	Republican	Chairman of Cities
Albany	3rd	William C. Baxter*	Republican	Chairman of Electricity, Gas and Water Supply
Allegany		William Duke Jr.	Republican	
Broome		Simon P. Quick*	Republican	Chairman of Penal Institutions
Cattaraugus		DeHart H. Ames*	Republican	
Cayuga		William F. Whitman*	Republican	
Chautauqua	1st	Leon L. Fancher	Republican	
Chautauqua	2nd	Joseph A. McGinnies	Republican	
Chemung		Robert P. Bush	Democrat	
Chenango		Bert Lord*	Republican	
Clinton		William R. Weaver	Republican	
Columbia		William Wallace Chace*	Republican	
Cortland		George H. Wiltsie*	Republican	Chairman of Banks
Delaware		Edwin A. Mackey*	Republican	
Dutchess	1st	James C. Allen*	Republican	
Dutchess	2nd	Frank L. Gardner	Republican	
Erie	1st	Alexander Taylor	Republican	
Erie	2nd	Ross Graves*	Republican	
Erie	3rd	Nicholas J. Miller*	Republican	Chairman of Public Institutions
Erie	4th	James M. Mead*	Democrat	
Erie	5th	John A. Lynch	Democrat	
Erie	6th	Peter C. Jezewski*	Republican	
Erie	7th	Joseph Roemhild Jr.	Rep./Progr.	
Erie	8th	Leonard W. H. Gibbs*	Republican	
Erie	9th	Nelson W. Cheney	Republican	
Essex		Raymond T. Kenyon*	Republican	
Franklin		Warren T. Thayer	Republican	
Fulton and Hamilton		Burt Z. Kasson	Republican	
Genesee		Louis H. Wells*	Republican	Chairman of Internal Affairs
Greene		George H. Chase*	Republican	Chairman of Commerce and Navigation
Herkimer		Selden C. Clobridge*	Republican	Chairman of Soldiers' Home
Jefferson	1st	H. Edmund Machold*	Republican	Chairman of Conservation
Jefferson	2nd	Willard S. Augsbury*	Republican	
Kings	1st	R. Hunter McQuistion*	Republican	Chairman of Social Welfare
Kings	2nd	William J. Gillen*	Democrat	
Kings	3rd	Frank J. Taylor*	Democrat	
Kings	4th	Peter A. McArdle*	Democrat	
Kings	5th	Fred G. Milligan Jr.*	Republican	
Kings	6th	Nathan D. Shapiro*	Republican	
Kings	7th	Daniel F. Farrell*	Democrat	
Kings	8th	John J. McKeon*	Democrat	
Kings	9th	Frederick S. Burr*	Democrat	
Kings	10th	Fred M. Ahern*	Republican	Chairman of Codes
Kings	11th	George R. Brennan*	Republican	Chairman of General Laws
Kings	12th	William T. Simpson*	Republican	
Kings	13th	Herman Kramer*	Democrat	
Kings	14th	John Peter La Frenz*	Democrat	
Kings	15th	Jeremiah F. Twomey	Democrat	
Kings	16th	Charles Joseph	Democrat	
Kings	17th	Frederick A. Wells*	Republican	
Kings	18th	Frederick B. Maerkle	Republican	
Kings	19th	William A. Bacher*	Democrat	
Kings	20th	August C. Flamman*	Republican	Chairman of Printed and Engrossed Bills
Kings	21st	Isaac Mendelsohn*	Democrat	
Kings	22nd	Charles H. Duff*	Republican	
Kings	23rd	Abraham I. Shiplacoff	Socialist	
Lewis		Henry L. Grant*	Republican	Chairman of Agriculture
Livingston		George F. Wheelock	Republican	
Madison		Morell E. Tallett*	Republican	Chairman of Public Education
Monroe	1st	James A. Harris*	Republican	
Monroe	2nd	Simon L. Adler*	Republican	Majority Leader
Monroe	3rd	John R. Powers*	Republican	
Monroe	4th	Frank Dobson*	Republican	
Monroe	5th	Franklin W. Judson*	Republican	
Montgomery		Erastus Corning Davis*	Republican	
Nassau		Thomas A. McWhinney*	Republican	
New York	1st	John J. Ryan*	Democrat	
New York	2nd	Peter J. Hamill	Democrat	
New York	3rd	Caesar B. F. Barra	Democrat	
New York	4th	Henry S. Schimmel*	Democrat	
New York	5th	Maurice McDonald*	Democrat	
New York	6th	Nathan D. Perlman*	Republican	Chairman of Claims
New York	7th	Peter P. McElligott*	Democrat	
New York	8th	Abraham Goodman	Democrat	
New York	9th	Charles D. Donohue*	Democrat	
New York	10th	Leon Bleecker	Rep./Progr.	
New York	11th	James F. Mahony	Democrat	
New York	12th	Joseph D. Kelly*	Democrat	
New York	13th	James C. Campbell*	Democrat	
New York	14th	Robert Lee Tudor*	Democrat	
New York	15th	Abram Ellenbogen*	Republican	Chairman of Charitable and Religious Societies
New York	16th	Martin G. McCue*	Democrat	
New York	17th	Vincent Gilroy	Democrat	
New York	18th	Mark Goldberg*	Democrat	
New York	19th	Perry M. Armstrong	Democrat	
New York	20th	Frank Aranow*	Democrat	
New York	21st	Thomas T. Reilley	Democrat	
New York	22nd	Maurice Bloch*	Democrat	
New York	23rd	Daniel C. Oliver*	Democrat	on November 7, 1916, elected to the 65th U.S. Congress
New York	24th	Owen M. Kiernan*	Democrat	
New York	25th	Robert McC. Marsh	Republican	
New York	26th	Meyer Levy	Democrat	
New York	27th	Hoffman Nickerson	Republican	
New York	28th	Salvatore A. Cotillo*	Democrat	
New York	29th	Alfred D. Bell	Republican	
New York	30th	Timothy F. Gould	Democrat	
New York	31st	Jacob Goldstein	Democrat	
Bronx	32nd	William S. Evans*	Democrat	
Bronx	33rd	Earl H. Miller*	Democrat	
Bronx	34th	M. Maldwin Fertig*	Democrat	
Bronx	35th	Joseph M. Callahan*	Democrat	Minority Leader
Niagara	1st	William Bewley*	Republican	Chairman of Labor and Industry
Niagara	2nd	Alan V. Parker*	Republican	
Oneida	1st	John J. Hess	Democrat	
Oneida	2nd	Louis M. Martin	Republican	
Oneida	3rd	George T. Davis	Republican	
Onondaga	1st	Edward Arnts*	Republican	Chairman of Canals
Onondaga	2nd	J. Leslie Kincaid*	Republican	Chairman of Military Affairs
Onondaga	3rd	George R. Fearon	Republican	
Ontario		Heber E. Wheeler*	Republican	
Orange	1st	William T. Snider	Republican	
Orange	2nd	Charles L. Mead	Republican	
Orleans		A. Allen Comstock*	Republican	
Oswego		Thaddeus C. Sweet*	Republican	re-elected Speaker; Chairman of Rules
Otsego		Allen J. Bloomfield*	Republican	
Putnam		Hamilton Fish III*	Progressive	
Queens	1st	Nicholas Nehrbauer Jr.*	Democrat	
Queens	2nd	Peter J. McGarry*	Democrat	
Queens	3rd	William H. O'Hare*	Democrat	
Queens	4th	George E. Polhemus*	Democrat	
Rensselaer	1st	John F. Shannon*	Democrat	
Rensselaer	2nd	Arthur Cowee	Republican	
Richmond		Stephen D. Stephens*	Democrat	
Rockland		William A. Serven	Republican	
St. Lawrence	1st	Frank L. Seaker*	Republican	Chairman of Railroads
St. Lawrence	2nd	Edward A. Everett*	Republican	
Saratoga		Gilbert T. Seelye*	Republican	Chairman of Public Health
Schenectady		Walter S. McNab*	Republican	
Schoharie		Edward A. Dox*	Democrat	
Schuyler		Henry J. Mitchell	Republican	
Seneca		William J. Maier*	Republican	Chairman of Ways and Means
Steuben	1st	Reuben B. Oldfield*	Republican	Chairman of Revision
Steuben	2nd	Richard M. Prangen*	Republican	
Suffolk	1st	DeWitt C. Talmage*	Republican	
Suffolk	2nd	Henry A. Murphy*	Republican	Chairman of Excise
Sullivan		William B. Voorhees	Republican	
Tioga		Daniel P. Witter	Republican	
Tompkins		Casper Fenner	Republican	
Ulster	1st	Henry R. DeWitt*	Republican	
Ulster	2nd	Abram P. Lefevre*	Republican	Chairman of Taxation and Retrenchment
Warren		Henry E. H. Brereton*	Republican	Chairman of Privileges and Elections
Washington		Charles O. Pratt*	Republican	Chairman of Villages
Wayne		Riley A. Wilson*	Republican	Chairman of Public Printing
Westchester	1st	George Blakely*	Republican	
Westchester	2nd	William S. Coffey*	Republican	Chairman of Insurance
Westchester	3rd	Walter W. Law Jr.*	Republican	
Westchester	4th	Floy D. Hopkins*	Republican	
Wyoming		John Knight*	Republican	Chairman of Judiciary
Yates		Howard S. Fullagar	Republican	

=== Employees ===
- Clerk: Fred W. Hammond
- Sergeant-at-Arms: Harry W. Haines
- Principal Doorkeeper: Fred R. Smith
- Stenographer: Paul E. McCarthy
- Postmaster: James H. Underwood

== Sources ==
- LEGISLATURE OPENS WITH RUSH OF WORK in NYT on January 6, 1916
- Laws of the State of New York (139th Session) (Vol. III; 1916)
