= 138th New York State Legislature =

New York state legislative session

←	137th	139th	→
- New York State Capitol (2009)

Overview
- Legislative body: New York State Legislature
- Jurisdiction: New York, United States
- Term: January 1 – December 31, 1915

Senate
- Members: 51
- President: Lt. Gov. Edward Schoeneck (R)
- Temporary President: Elon R. Brown (R)
- Party control: Republican (34-17)

Assembly
- Members: 150
- Speaker: Thaddeus C. Sweet (R)
- Party control: Republican (99-49-2)

Sessions
- 1st: January 6 – April 24, 1915

The 138th New York State Legislature, consisting of the New York State Senate and the New York State Assembly, met from January 6 to April 24, 1915, during the first year of Charles S. Whitman's governorship, in Albany.

== Background ==
Under the provisions of the New York Constitution of 1894, re-apportioned in 1906 and 1907, 51 Senators and 150 assemblymen were elected in single-seat districts; senators for a two-year term, assemblymen for a one-year term. The senatorial districts were made up of entire counties, except New York County (twelve districts), Kings County (eight districts), Erie County (three districts) and Monroe County (two districts). The Assembly districts were made up of contiguous area, all within the same county.

At this time there were two major political parties: the Republican Party and the Democratic Party. Assemblyman William Sulzer, who had been removed from the office of governor in 1913, founded an American Party and ran also on the Prohibition Party ticket for governor. The Independence League, the Progressive Party, the Socialist Party and the Socialist Labor Party also nominated tickets.

== Elections ==
The 1914 New York state election, was held on November 3. D.A. of New York County Charles S. Whitman and Edward Schoeneck were elected Governor and Lieutenant Governor; both Republicans. Of the other seven statewide elective offices, six were carried by Republicans and one by a Democrat. The approximate party strength at this election, as expressed by the vote for governor, was: Republicans 687,000; Democrats 412,000; Independence League 125,000; American 71,000; Prohibition 54,000; Progressives 46,000; Socialists 38,000; and Socialist Labor 2,000.

Also elected were 34 Republicans and 17 Democrats to the State Senate; 99 Republicans, 49 Democrats and two Progressives to the State Assembly; and 168 delegates (15 at-large; and three per senatorial district) to the Constitutional Convention.

== Sessions ==
The Legislature met for the regular session at the State Capitol in Albany on January 6, 1915; and adjourned on April 24.

Thaddeus C. Sweet (R) was re-elected Speaker,

Elon R. Brown (R) was elected Temporary President of the Senate.

On April 6, the Constitutional Convention met at the State Capitol in Albany; and adjourned on September 4. All proposed amendments to the Constitution were rejected by the voters at the state election on November 2, 1915.

== State Senate ==
=== Districts ===
- 1st District: Nassau and Suffolk counties
- 2nd District: Queens County, i.e the Borough of Queens
- 3rd, 4th, 5th, 6th, 7th, 8th, 9th and 10th District: Parts of Kings County, i.e. the Borough of Brooklyn
- 11th, 12th, 13th, 14th, 15th, 16th, 17th, 18th, 19th and 20th District: Parts of New York County, i.e. the Borough of Manhattan
- 21st and 22nd District: Parts of Bronx County, i.e. the Borough of the Bronx
- 23rd District: Richmond and Rockland counties
- 24th District: Westchester County
- 25th District: Orange and Sullivan counties
- 26th District: Columbia, Dutchess and Putnam and counties
- 27th District: Greene and Ulster counties
- 28th District: Albany County
- 29th District: Rensselaer County
- 30th District: Saratoga and Washington counties
- 31st District: Montgomery, Schenectady and Schoharie counties
- 32nd District: Lewis, Fulton, Hamilton and Herkimer counties
- 33rd District: Clinton, Essex and Warren counties
- 34th District: Franklin and St. Lawrence counties
- 35th District: Jefferson and Oswego counties
- 36th District: Oneida County
- 37th District: Chenango, Madison and Otsego counties
- 38th District: Onondaga County
- 39th District: Broome and Delaware counties
- 40th District: Cayuga, Cortland and Seneca counties
- 41st District: Chemung, Schuyler, Tioga and Tompkins counties
- 42nd District: Ontario, Wayne and Yates counties
- 43rd District: Steuben and Livingston counties
- 44th District: Allegany, Genesee and Wyoming counties
- 45th and 46th District: Monroe County
- 47th District: Niagara and Orleans counties
- 48th, 49th and 50th District: Erie County
- 51st District: Cattaraugus and Chautauqua counties

=== Senators ===
The asterisk (*) denotes members of the previous Legislature who continued in office as members of this Legislature. Charles C. Lockwood, Alvah W. Burlingame Jr., Jimmy Walker, Franklin W. Cristman, Samuel A. Jones, Clinton T. Horton and William P. Greiner changed from the Assembly to the Senate.

Note: For brevity, the chairmanships omit the words "...the Committee on (the)..."

District	Senator	Party	Notes
1st	George L. Thompson	Republican	
2nd	Bernard M. Patten*	Democrat	contested by Christian Weiland
3rd	Thomas H. Cullen*	Democrat	
4th	Charles C. Lockwood*	Republican	Chairman of Public Education
5th	William J. Heffernan*	Democrat	
6th	William B. Carswell*	Democrat	
7th	Daniel J. Carroll*	Democrat	
8th	Alvah W. Burlingame Jr.*	Republican	Chairman of Revision
9th	Robert R. Lawson	Republican	Chairman of Printed and Engrossed Bills
10th	Alfred J. Gilchrist	Republican	Chairman of Commerce and Navigation
11th	Christopher D. Sullivan*	Democrat	
12th	Henry W. Doll	Democrat	
13th	Jimmy Walker*	Democrat	
14th	James A. Foley*	Democrat	also a delegate to the Constitutional Convention
15th	John J. Boylan*	Democrat	
16th	Robert F. Wagner*	Democrat	Minority Leader; also a delegate to the Constitutional Convention
17th	Ogden L. Mills	Rep./Progr.	
18th	William M. Bennett	Rep./Progr.	
19th	George W. Simpson*	Democrat	
20th	Irving J. Joseph	Democrat	
21st	John J. Dunnigan	Democrat	
22nd	James A. Hamilton	Democrat	
23rd	George Cromwell	Republican	
24th	George A. Slater	Republican	
25th	John D. Stivers*	Republican	Chairman of Military Affairs
26th	James E. Towner*	Republican	Chairman of Insurance
27th	Charles W. Walton	Republican	
28th	Henry M. Sage*	Republican	Chairman of Finance
29th	Walter A. Wood Jr.	Republican	Chairman of Conservation; died on October 8, 1915
30th	George H. Whitney*	Republican	Chairman of Public Health
31st	Arden L. Norton	Republican	Chairman of Canals
32nd	Franklin W. Cristman*	Republican	Chairman of Privileges and Elections
33rd	James A. Emerson*	Republican	Chairman of Taxation and Retrenchment
34th	N. Monroe Marshall	Republican	Chairman of Banks
35th	Elon R. Brown*	Republican	elected Temporary President; Chairman of Rules
36th	Charles W. Wicks	Republican	
37th	Samuel A. Jones*	Republican	Chairman of Affairs of Villages
38th	J. Henry Walters*	Republican	Chairman of Judiciary
39th	William H. Hill	Rep./Progr.	
40th	Charles J. Hewitt*	Republican	Chairman of Internal Affairs
41st	Morris S. Halliday	Republican	Chairman of Penal Institutions
42nd	Thomas B. Wilson*	Republican	Chairman of Agriculture
43rd	Charles D. Newton	Republican	Chairman of Codes
44th	Archie D. Sanders	Republican	
45th	George F. Argetsinger*	Republican	Chairman of Affairs of Cities
46th	John B. Mullan	Republican	Chairman of Public Printing
47th	George F. Thompson*	Republican	Chairman of Public Service
48th	Clinton T. Horton*	Republican	Chairman of Civil Service
49th	Samuel J. Ramsperger*	Democrat	
50th	William P. Greiner*	Democrat	
51st	George E. Spring	Republican	Chairman of Labor and Industry

=== Employees ===
- Clerk: Ernest A. Fay
- Sergeant-at-Arms: Charles R. Hotaling
- Assistant Sergeant-at-Arms: Samuel Russell
- Principal Doorkeeper: Lee V. Gardner
- First Assistant Doorkeeper: George W. Van Hyning
- Stenographer: John K. Marshall (also Stenographer of the Constitutional Convention)

== State Assembly ==
Note: For brevity, the chairmanships omit the words "...the Committee on (the)..."

=== Assemblymen ===
District		Assemblymen	Party	Notes
Albany	1st	Harold J. Hinman*	Republican	Majority Leader; also a delegate to the Constitutional Convention
Albany	2nd	John G. Malone*	Republican	Chairman of Excise
Albany	3rd	William C. Baxter*	Republican	Chairman of Villages
Allegany		Elmer E. Ferry*	Republican	
Broome		Simon P. Quick*	Republican	
Cattaraugus		DeHart H. Ames	Republican	
Cayuga		William F. Whitman	Republican	
Chautauqua	1st	A. Morelle Cheney*	Republican	
Chautauqua	2nd	John Leo Sullivan*	Republican	Chairman of Internal Affairs
Chemung		Horace K. Walker	Rep./Progr.	
Chenango		Bert Lord	Republican	
Clinton		Alexander W. Fairbank*	Republican	
Columbia		William Wallace Chace	Republican	
Cortland		George H. Wiltsie	Republican	
Delaware		Edwin A. Mackey*	Republican	
Dutchess	1st	James C. Allen	Rep./Progr.	
Dutchess	2nd	Francis G. Landon	Republican	Chairman of Taxation and Retrenchment
Erie	1st	Allen Keeney	Republican	
Erie	2nd	Ross Graves	Republican	
Erie	3rd	Nicholas J. Miller	Republican	Chairman of Public Institutions
Erie	4th	James M. Mead	Democrat	
Erie	5th	Arthur G. McElroy	Democrat	
Erie	6th	Peter C. Jezewski	Rep./Progr.	
Erie	7th	John F. Heim	Republican	
Erie	8th	Leonard W. H. Gibbs	Republican	
Erie	9th	Frank B. Thorn*	Republican	Chairman of Judiciary
Essex		Raymond T. Kenyon*	Republican	
Franklin		Alexander Macdonald*	Republican	Chairman of Ways and Means
Fulton and Hamilton		James H. Wood*	Republican	Chairman of Claims
Genesee		Louis H. Wells*	Republican	
Greene		George H. Chase*	Republican	
Herkimer		Selden C. Clobridge	Republican	
Jefferson	1st	H. Edmund Machold*	Republican	Chairman of Conservation
Jefferson	2nd	Willard S. Augsbury	Republican	
Kings	1st	R. Hunter McQuistion*	Rep./Progr.	
Kings	2nd	William J. Gillen*	Democrat	
Kings	3rd	Frank J. Taylor*	Democrat	
Kings	4th	Peter A. McArdle	Democrat	
Kings	5th	Fred G. Milligan Jr.	Republican	
Kings	6th	Nathan D. Shapiro	Republican	
Kings	7th	Daniel F. Farrell*	Democrat	
Kings	8th	John J. McKeon*	Democrat	
Kings	9th	Frederick S. Burr	Democrat	
Kings	10th	Fred M. Ahern*	Rep./Progr.	Chairman of General Laws
Kings	11th	George R. Brennan*	Republican	Chairman of Insurance
Kings	12th	William T. Simpson*	Republican	
Kings	13th	Herman Kramer*	Democrat	
Kings	14th	John Peter La Frenz*	Democrat	
Kings	15th	James J. Phelan*	Democrat	
Kings	16th	Samuel R. Green*	Republican	
Kings	17th	Frederick A. Wells	Republican	
Kings	18th	Almeth W. Hoff*	Republican	Chairman of Cities
Kings	19th	William A. Bacher	Democrat	
Kings	20th	August C. Flamman*	Rep./Progr.	Chairman of Printed and Engrossed Bills
Kings	21st	Isaac Mendelsohn	Democrat	
Kings	22nd	Charles H. Duff	Republican	
Kings	23rd	Nathan B. Finkelstein	Rep./Progr.	
Lewis		Henry L. Grant*	Republican	
Livingston		Edward M. Magee*	Republican	Chairman of Revision
Madison		Morell E. Tallett*	Republican	Chairman of Education
Monroe	1st	James A. Harris	Republican	
Monroe	2nd	Simon L. Adler*	Republican	Chairman of Banks
Monroe	3rd	John R. Powers	Republican	
Monroe	4th	Frank Dobson	Republican	
Monroe	5th	Franklin W. Judson	Republican	
Montgomery		Erastus Corning Davis	Republican	
Nassau		Thomas A. McWhinney	Republican	
New York	1st	John J. Ryan	Democrat	
New York	2nd	Al Smith*	Democrat	Minority Leader; also a delegate to the Constitutional Convention; on November 2, 1915, elected Sheriff of New York Co.
New York	3rd	Carmine J. Marasco	Democrat	
New York	4th	Henry S. Schimmel*	Democrat	
New York	5th	Maurice McDonald	Democrat	
New York	6th	Nathan D. Perlman	Rep./Progr.	
New York	7th	Peter P. McElligott*	Democrat	
New York	8th	Sidney Scharlin	Democrat	
New York	9th	Charles D. Donohue*	Democrat	
New York	10th	Walter M. Friedland	Democrat	
New York	11th	John Kerrigan*	Democrat	
New York	12th	Joseph D. Kelly*	Democrat	
New York	13th	James C. Campbell*	Democrat	
New York	14th	Robert Lee Tudor*	Democrat	
New York	15th	Abram Ellenbogen*	Republican	
New York	16th	Martin G. McCue*	Democrat	
New York	17th	Martin Bourke	Republican	
New York	18th	Mark Goldberg*	Democrat	
New York	19th	Patrick F. Cotter	Democrat	
New York	20th	Frank Aranow	Democrat	
New York	21st	Harold C. Mitchell	Republican	
New York	22nd	Maurice Bloch	Democrat	
New York	23rd	Daniel C. Oliver	Democrat	
New York	24th	Owen M. Kiernan*	Democrat	
New York	25th	Francis R. Stoddard Jr.*	Republican	Chairman of Military Affairs
New York	26th	Joseph Steinberg*	Progr./Rep.	
New York	27th	Charles E. Rice Jr.	Republican	
New York	28th	Salvatore A. Cotillo	Democrat	
New York	29th	Howard Conkling*	Republican	Chairman of Canals
New York	30th	Dennis G. Donovan	Democrat	
New York	31st	Aaron A. Feinberg	Republican	
Bronx	32nd	William S. Evans	Democrat	
Bronx	33rd	Earl H. Miller	Democrat	
Bronx	34th	M. Maldwin Fertig	Democrat	
Bronx	35th	Joseph M. Callahan	Democrat	
Niagara	1st	William Bewley*	Republican	
Niagara	2nd	Alan V. Parker	Republican	
Oneida	1st	Fred Frank Emden*	Democrat	
Oneida	2nd	Charles J. Fuess*	Republican	
Oneida	3rd	John Brayton Fuller*	Republican	Chairman of Commerce and Navigation
Onondaga	1st	Edward Arnts*	Republican	
Onondaga	2nd	J. Leslie Kincaid	Republican	
Onondaga	3rd	Jacob R. Buecheler*	Republican	
Ontario		Heber E. Wheeler*	Republican	
Orange	1st	James B. Montgomery*	Republican	Chairman of Soldiers' Home
Orange	2nd	Charles J. Boyd*	Republican	
Orleans		A. Allen Comstock	Republican	
Oswego		Thaddeus C. Sweet*	Rep./Progr.	re-elected Speaker; Chairman of Rules
Otsego		Allen J. Bloomfield	Republican	
Putnam		Hamilton Fish III*	Progr./Dem.	
Queens	1st	Nicholas Nehrbauer Jr.*	Democrat	
Queens	2nd	Peter J. McGarry*	Democrat	
Queens	3rd	William H. O'Hare	Democrat	
Queens	4th	George E. Polhemus	Democrat	
Rensselaer	1st	John F. Shannon	Democrat	
Rensselaer	2nd	Edwin S. Comstock	Republican	
Richmond		Stephen D. Stephens	Democrat	
Rockland		Frederick George Grimme	Democrat	
St. Lawrence	1st	Frank L. Seaker*	Republican	Chairman of Railroads
St. Lawrence	2nd	Edward A. Everett	Republican	
Saratoga		Gilbert T. Seelye*	Republican	Chairman of Health
Schenectady		Walter S. McNab	Republican	
Schoharie		Edward A. Dox*	Democrat	
Schuyler		Henry S. Howard*	Republican	Chairman of Charitable and Religious Societies
Seneca		William J. Maier*	Republican	Chairman of Electricity, Gas and Water Supply
Steuben	1st	Reuben B. Oldfield	Republican	
Steuben	2nd	Richard M. Prangen	Republican	
Suffolk	1st	DeWitt C. Talmage*	Republican	Chairman of Labor
Suffolk	2nd	Henry A. Murphy*	Republican	
Sullivan		H. Blake Stratton	Dem./Progr.	
Tioga		Wilson S. Moore*	Republican	
Tompkins		John W. Preswick*	Republican	
Ulster	1st	Henry R. DeWitt*	Republican	
Ulster	2nd	Abram P. Lefevre*	Republican	
Warren		Henry E. H. Brereton*	Republican	Chairman of Privileges and Elections
Washington		Charles O. Pratt*	Republican	
Wayne		Riley A. Wilson*	Republican	Chairman of Printing
Westchester	1st	George Blakely*	Republican	
Westchester	2nd	William S. Coffey	Republican	
Westchester	3rd	Walter W. Law Jr.*	Republican	Chairman of Penal Institutions
Westchester	4th	Floy D. Hopkins*	Republican	Chairman of Social Welfare
Wyoming		John Knight*	Republican	Chairman of Codes
Yates		Edward C. Gillett*	Republican	Chairman of Agriculture

=== Employees ===
- Clerk: Fred W. Hammond
- Sergeant-at-Arms: Harry W. Haines (also Sergeant-at-Arms of the Constitutional Convention)
- Principal Doorkeeper:
- First Assistant Doorkeeper:
- Second Assistant Doorkeeper:
- Stenographer:
- Postmaster: James H. Underwood

== Sources ==
- FULL TICKETS OF THE PARTIES in NYT on October 25, 1914
- THE LEGISLATURE RESUMES WORK in The Yonkers Statesman on January 14, 1915
- Journal of the Senate (138th Session) (1915; Vol. I, from January 6 to March 31)
- Journal of the Senate (138th Session) (1915; Vol. II, from March 31 to April 24)
- Laws of the State of New York (138th Session) (1915)
- Documents of the Constitutional Convention of the State of New York 1915 (1915)
