= 140th New York State Legislature =

New York state legislative session

←	139th	141st	→
- New York State Capitol (2009)

Overview
- Legislative body: New York State Legislature
- Jurisdiction: New York, United States
- Term: January 1 – December 31, 1917

Senate
- Members: 51
- President: Lt. Gov. Edward Schoeneck (R)
- Temporary President: Elon R. Brown (R)
- Party control: Republican (35-15)

Assembly
- Members: 150
- Speaker: Thaddeus C. Sweet (R)
- Party control: Republican (99-49-2)

Sessions
- 1st: January 3 – May 10, 1917
- 2nd: July 31 – October 2, 1917

The 140th New York State Legislature, consisting of the New York State Senate and the New York State Assembly, met from January 3 to October 2, 1917, during the third year of Charles S. Whitman's governorship, in Albany.

== Background ==
Under the provisions of the New York Constitution of 1894, re-apportioned in 1906 and 1907, 51 Senators and 150 assemblymen were elected in single-seat districts; senators for a two-year term, assemblymen for a one-year term. The senatorial districts were made up of entire counties, except New York County (twelve districts), Kings County (eight districts), Erie County (three districts) and Monroe County (two districts). The Assembly districts were made up of contiguous area, all within the same county.

At this time there were two major political parties: the Republican Party and the Democratic Party. The Socialist Party, the Prohibition Party, the Progressive Party, the Independence League, the Socialist Labor Party and the American Party also nominated tickets.

== Elections ==
The 1916 New York state election, was held on November 7. Charles S. Whitman and Edward Schoeneck were re-elected Governor and Lieutenant Governor; both Republicans. The other eight statewide elective offices were also carried by Republicans. The approximate party strength at this election, as expressed by the vote for Governor, was: Republicans 836,000; Democrats 687,000; Socialists 63,000; Prohibition 22,000; Progressives 7,000; Independence League 5,000; Socialist Labor 4,000; and American 2,000.

== Sessions ==
The Legislature met for the regular session at the State Capitol in Albany on January 3, 1917; and adjourned on May 10.

Thaddeus C. Sweet (R) was re-elected Speaker.

Elon R. Brown (R) was re-elected Temporary President of the State Senate.

The Legislature redistricted the Senate seats, and re-apportioned the number of assemblymen per county. Bronx County—which had been part of New York County at the time of the previous apportionment and occupied roughly the area of four Assembly districts—was properly separated, and was apportioned eight seats. New York County (without the Bronx) lost eight seats; and Erie, Jefferson and Ulster counties lost one seat each. Queens County gained two seats; and Broome, Nassau, Richmond, Schenectady and Westchester counties gained one seat each.

The Legislature met for a special session at the State Capitol in Albany on July 31, 1917. This session was called to enact food control legislation, which would regulate the seizure and shipping of food to the Allies in Europe, helping them with their war effort against Germany during World War I.

On August 24, the Food Control Bill was passed by the Legislature. The bill established a three-member Food Control Commission. The Legislature took a recess until September 6.

On September 7, the State Senate rejected the nomination of George Walbridge Perkins as Chairman of the Food Control Commission, and took a recess until September 25.

On October 2, the State Senate rejected again the nomination of Perkins; and then confirmed the appointment of John Mitchell, Jacob Gould Schurman and Charles A. Wieting to the Food Control Commission. The Legislature then adjourned sine die.

== State Senate ==
=== Districts ===
- 1st District: Nassau and Suffolk counties
- 2nd District: Queens County, i.e the Borough of Queens
- 3rd, 4th, 5th, 6th, 7th, 8th, 9th and 10th District: Parts of Kings County, i.e. the Borough of Brooklyn
- 11th, 12th, 13th, 14th, 15th, 16th, 17th, 18th, 19th and 20th District: Parts of New York County, i.e. the Borough of Manhattan
- 21st and 22nd District: Parts of Bronx County, i.e. the Borough of the Bronx
- 23rd District: Richmond and Rockland counties
- 24th District: Westchester County
- 25th District: Orange and Sullivan counties
- 26th District: Columbia, Dutchess and Putnam and counties
- 27th District: Greene and Ulster counties
- 28th District: Albany County
- 29th District: Rensselaer County
- 30th District: Saratoga and Washington counties
- 31st District: Montgomery, Schenectady and Schoharie counties
- 32nd District: Lewis, Fulton, Hamilton and Herkimer counties
- 33rd District: Clinton, Essex and Warren counties
- 34th District: Franklin and St. Lawrence counties
- 35th District: Jefferson and Oswego counties
- 36th District: Oneida County
- 37th District: Chenango, Madison and Otsego counties
- 38th District: Onondaga County
- 39th District: Broome and Delaware counties
- 40th District: Cayuga, Cortland and Seneca counties
- 41st District: Chemung, Schuyler, Tioga and Tompkins counties
- 42nd District: Ontario, Wayne and Yates counties
- 43rd District: Steuben and Livingston counties
- 44th District: Allegany, Genesee and Wyoming counties
- 45th and 46th District: Monroe County
- 47th District: Niagara and Orleans counties
- 48th, 49th and 50th District: Erie County
- 51st District: Cattaraugus and Chautauqua counties

=== Members ===
The asterisk (*) denotes members of the previous Legislature who continued in office as members of this Legislature. Salvatore A. Cotillo, John Knight, Ross Graves and Leonard W. H. Gibbs changed from the Assembly to the Senate.

Note: For brevity, the chairmanships omit the words "...the Committee on (the)..."

District	Senator	Party	Notes
1st	George L. Thompson*	Republican	re-elected
2nd	Peter M. Daly	Democrat	resigned on October 11
3rd	Thomas H. Cullen*	Democrat	re-elected
4th	Charles C. Lockwood*	Republican	re-elected
5th	William J. Heffernan*	Democrat	re-elected
6th	Charles F. Murphy	Republican	
7th	Daniel J. Carroll*	Democrat	re-elected
8th	Alvah W. Burlingame Jr.*	Republican	re-elected
9th	Robert R. Lawson*	Republican	re-elected
10th	Alfred J. Gilchrist*	Republican	re-elected
11th	Bernard Downing	Democrat	
12th	Jacob Koenig	Democrat	
13th	Jimmy Walker*	Democrat	re-elected
14th	James A. Foley*	Democrat	re-elected
15th	John J. Boylan*	Democrat	re-elected
16th	Robert F. Wagner*	Democrat	re-elected; Minority Leader
17th	Ogden L. Mills*	Republican	re-elected; resigned on July 31, 1917; Chairman of Affairs of the City of New York
18th	Albert Ottinger	Republican	
19th	Edward J. Dowling	Democrat	
20th	Salvatore A. Cotillo*	Democrat	
21st	John J. Dunnigan*	Democrat	re-elected
22nd	John V. Sheridan	Democrat	
23rd	George Cromwell*	Republican	re-elected
24th	George A. Slater*	Republican	re-elected
25th	John D. Stivers*	Republican	re-elected
26th	James E. Towner*	Republican	re-elected
27th	Charles W. Walton*	Republican	re-elected
28th	Henry M. Sage*	Republican	re-elected
29th	George B. Wellington*	Republican	re-elected
30th	George H. Whitney*	Republican	re-elected
31st	James W. Yelverton	Republican	
32nd	Theodore Douglas Robinson	Republican	
33rd	James A. Emerson*	Republican	re-elected
34th	N. Monroe Marshall*	Republican	re-elected
35th	Elon R. Brown*	Republican	re-elected; re-elected Temporary President
36th	Charles W. Wicks*	Republican	re-elected
37th	Adon P. Brown	Republican	
38th	J. Henry Walters*	Republican	re-elected
39th	William H. Hill*	Republican	re-elected
40th	Charles J. Hewitt*	Republican	re-elected
41st	Morris S. Halliday*	Republican	re-elected
42nd	William A. Carson	Republican	
43rd	Charles D. Newton*	Republican	re-elected
44th	John Knight*	Republican	
45th	George F. Argetsinger*	Republican	re-elected
46th	John B. Mullan*	Republican	re-elected
47th	George F. Thompson*	Republican	re-elected
48th	Ross Graves*	Republican	
49th	Samuel J. Ramsperger*	Democrat	re-elected
50th	Leonard W. H. Gibbs*	Republican	
51st	(George E. Spring)*	Republican	re-elected; did not attend the session and died on January 25, 1917

=== Employees ===
- Clerk: Ernest A. Fay
- Sergeant-at-Arms: Charles R. Hotaling
- Stenographer:

== State Assembly ==
Note: For brevity, the chairmanships omit the words "...the Committee on (the)..."

=== Assemblymen ===
District		Assemblymen	Party	Notes
Albany	1st	Clarence F. Welsh*	Republican	
Albany	2nd	John G. Malone*	Republican	
Albany	3rd	William C. Baxter*	Republican	
Allegany		William Duke Jr.*	Republican	
Broome		Edmund B. Jenks	Republican	
Cattaraugus		DeHart H. Ames*	Republican	
Cayuga		L. Ford Hager	Republican	
Chautauqua	1st	Leon L. Fancher*	Republican	
Chautauqua	2nd	Joseph A. McGinnies*	Republican	
Chemung		Robert P. Bush*	Democrat	
Chenango		Bert Lord*	Republican	
Clinton		Wallace E. Pierce	Republican	
Columbia		William Wallace Chace*	Republican	
Cortland		George H. Wiltsie*	Republican	
Delaware		James S. Allen	Republican	
Dutchess	1st	James C. Allen*	Republican	
Dutchess	2nd	Frank L. Gardner*	Republican	
Erie	1st	Alexander Taylor*	Republican	
Erie	2nd	John W. Slacer	Republican	
Erie	3rd	Nicholas J. Miller*	Republican	
Erie	4th	James M. Mead*	Democrat	
Erie	5th	John A. Lynch*	Democrat	
Erie	6th	Alexander A. Patrzykowski	Democrat	
Erie	7th	Earl G. Danser	Republican	
Erie	8th	Herbert A. Zimmerman	Republican	
Erie	9th	Nelson W. Cheney*	Republican	
Essex		Raymond T. Kenyon*	Republican	
Franklin		Warren T. Thayer*	Republican	
Fulton and Hamilton		Burt Z. Kasson*	Republican	
Genesee		Louis H. Wells*	Republican	
Greene		Harding Showers	Republican	
Herkimer		Edward O. Davies	Republican	
Jefferson	1st	H. Edmund Machold*	Republican	Chairman of Ways and Means
Jefferson	2nd	Willard S. Augsbury*	Republican	
Kings	1st	George H. Ericson	Republican	
Kings	2nd	Patrick H. Larney	Democrat	
Kings	3rd	Frank J. Taylor*	Democrat	
Kings	4th	Peter A. McArdle*	Democrat	
Kings	5th	James H. Caulfield Jr.	Republican	
Kings	6th	Nathan D. Shapiro*	Republican	
Kings	7th	Daniel F. Farrell*	Democrat	
Kings	8th	John J. McKeon*	Democrat	
Kings	9th	Frederick S. Burr*	Democrat	
Kings	10th	Fred M. Ahern*	Republican	
Kings	11th	George R. Brennan*	Republican	
Kings	12th	William T. Simpson*	Republican	
Kings	13th	Morgan T. Donnelly	Democrat	
Kings	14th	John Peter La Frenz*	Democrat	
Kings	15th	Jeremiah F. Twomey*	Democrat	
Kings	16th	Samuel R. Green	Republican	
Kings	17th	Frederick A. Wells*	Republican	
Kings	18th	Wilfred E. Youker	Republican	
Kings	19th	Benjamin C. Klingmann	Democrat	
Kings	20th	August C. Flamman*	Republican	
Kings	21st	Joseph A. Whitehorn	Socialist	unsuccessfully contested by Isaac Mendelsohn (D)
Kings	22nd	Charles H. Duff*	Republican	
Kings	23rd	Abraham I. Shiplacoff*	Socialist	
Lewis		Henry L. Grant*	Republican	
Livingston		George F. Wheelock*	Republican	
Madison		Morell E. Tallett*	Republican	
Monroe	1st	James A. Harris*	Republican	
Monroe	2nd	Simon L. Adler*	Republican	Majority Leader
Monroe	3rd	Harry B. Crowley	Republican	
Monroe	4th	Frank Dobson*	Republican	
Monroe	5th	Franklin W. Judson*	Republican	
Montgomery		Erastus Corning Davis*	Republican	
Nassau		Thomas A. McWhinney*	Republican	
New York	1st	John J. Ryan*	Democrat	
New York	2nd	Peter J. Hamill*	Democrat	
New York	3rd	Caesar B. F. Barra*	Democrat	
New York	4th	Henry S. Schimmel*	Democrat	
New York	5th	Maurice McDonald*	Democrat	
New York	6th	Nathan D. Perlman*	Republican	
New York	7th	Peter P. McElligott*	Democrat	
New York	8th	Abraham Goodman*	Democrat	
New York	9th	Charles D. Donohue*	Democrat	
New York	10th	Abner Greenberg	Democrat	contested by Max S. Seidler (R)
New York	11th	James F. Mahony*	Democrat	
New York	12th	Joseph D. Kelly*	Democrat	
New York	13th	Fredolin F. Straub	Democrat	
New York	14th	Robert Lee Tudor*	Democrat	
New York	15th	Abram Ellenbogen*	Republican	
New York	16th	Martin G. McCue*	Democrat	
New York	17th	Martin Bourke	Republican	
New York	18th	Mark Goldberg*	Democrat	
New York	19th	Perry M. Armstrong*	Democrat	
New York	20th	Frank Aranow*	Democrat	
New York	21st	Harold C. Mitchell	Republican	
New York	22nd	Maurice Bloch*	Democrat	
New York	23rd	Earl A. Smith	Democrat	
New York	24th	Owen M. Kiernan*	Democrat	
New York	25th	Robert McC. Marsh*	Republican	
New York	26th	Meyer Levy*	Democrat	
New York	27th	Schuyler M. Meyer	Republican	
New York	28th	Charles Novello	Republican	contested by James M. Vincent (D)
New York	29th	Alfred D. Bell*	Republican	
New York	30th	Timothy F. Gould*	Democrat	
New York	31st	Jacob Goldstein*	Democrat	
Bronx	32nd	William S. Evans*	Democrat	
Bronx	33rd	Earl H. Miller*	Democrat	
Bronx	34th	M. Maldwin Fertig*	Democrat	
Bronx	35th	Joseph M. Callahan*	Democrat	Minority Leader; on November 6, 1917, elected Clerk of Bronx Co.
Niagara	1st	William Bewley*	Republican	
Niagara	2nd	Alan V. Parker*	Republican	
Oneida	1st	Albert H. Geiersbach	Democrat	
Oneida	2nd	Louis M. Martin*	Republican	
Oneida	3rd	George T. Davis*	Republican	
Onondaga	1st	Manuel J. Soule	Republican	
Onondaga	2nd	Harley J. Crane	Republican	
Onondaga	3rd	George R. Fearon*	Republican	
Ontario		Heber E. Wheeler*	Republican	
Orange	1st	William F. Brush	Republican	
Orange	2nd	Charles L. Mead*	Republican	
Orleans		Frank H. Lattin	Republican	
Oswego		Thaddeus C. Sweet*	Republican	re-elected Speaker
Otsego		Allen J. Bloomfield*	Republican	
Putnam		John P. Donohoe	Republican	
Queens	1st	Peter A. Leininger	Democrat	
Queens	2nd	Peter J. McGarry*	Democrat	
Queens	3rd	William H. O'Hare*	Democrat	
Queens	4th	Frank E. Hopkins	Republican	
Rensselaer	1st	John F. Shannon*	Democrat	
Rensselaer	2nd	Arthur Cowee*	Republican	
Richmond		Henry A. Seesselberg	Democrat	
Rockland		William A. Serven*	Republican	
St. Lawrence	1st	Frank L. Seaker*	Republican	
St. Lawrence	2nd	Edward A. Everett*	Republican	
Saratoga		Gilbert T. Seelye*	Republican	
Schenectady		Walter S. McNab*	Republican	
Schoharie		George A. Parsons	Democrat	
Schuyler		Henry J. Mitchell*	Republican	
Seneca		Lewis W. Johnson	Republican	
Steuben	1st	Samuel E. Quackenbush	Republican	
Steuben	2nd	Richard M. Prangen*	Republican	
Suffolk	1st	DeWitt C. Talmage*	Republican	
Suffolk	2nd	Henry A. Murphy*	Republican	Chairman of Excise
Sullivan		Seymour Merritt	Democrat	
Tioga		Daniel P. Witter*	Republican	
Tompkins		Casper Fenner*	Republican	
Ulster	1st	Joel Brink	Republican	
Ulster	2nd	Abram P. Lefevre*	Republican	
Warren		Henry E. H. Brereton*	Republican	
Washington		Charles O. Pratt*	Republican	Chairman of Judiciary
Wayne		Frank D. Gaylord	Republican	
Westchester	1st	George Blakely*	Republican	
Westchester	2nd	William S. Coffey*	Republican	
Westchester	3rd	Walter W. Law Jr.*	Republican	
Westchester	4th	Floy D. Hopkins*	Republican	
Wyoming		Bert P. Gage	Republican	
Yates		Howard S. Fullagar*	Republican	

=== Employees ===
- Clerk: Fred W. Hammond
- Sergeant-at-Arms: Harry W. Haines
- Postmaster: James H. Underwood
- General Clerk: Wilson Messer

== Sources ==
- NEXT LEGISLATURE FIRMLY REPUBLICAN in NYT on November 8, 1916
- REPUBLICANS GAIN MORE LEGISLATORS in NYT on November 9, 1916
- URGES A COMMITTEE FOR NEW YORK BILLS in NYT on January 3, 1917
