= Willard S. Augsbury =

American politician

Willard Shurtleff Augsbury (August 31, 1858 – August 15, 1939) was an American businessman, banker and politician from New York.

== Life ==
He was born on August 31, 1858 in Plessis, Jefferson County, New York.

He graduated from Phillips Exeter Academy in 1876. Then he attended Yale College for a year, but left without degree.

He married Mary Ellis (1863–1920), but they had no children. Mary Augsbury was Regent of the New York State Conference of the Daughters of the American Revolution in 1913 and 1914.

Willard Augsbury and his brother Frank established in 1898 the first electric light network in Antwerp. They also established a paper mill, and in 1914 Willard became President of the Bank of Antwerp.

He was a member of the New York State Assembly (Jefferson Co., 2nd D.) in 1915, 1916 and 1917; and a member of the New York State Senate (37th D.) in 1923 and 1924.

He died on August 15, 1939, in Antwerp, New York; and was buried at the Hillside Cemetery there.

== Sources ==
New York State Assembly
Preceded by John G. Jones	New York State Assembly; Jefferson County, 2nd District; 1915–1917	Succeeded by district abolished
New York State Senate
Preceded by Fred B. Pitcher	New York State Senate; 37th District; 1923–1924	Succeeded by Perley A. Pitcher
