= Joseph M. Callahan =

American lawyer and politician

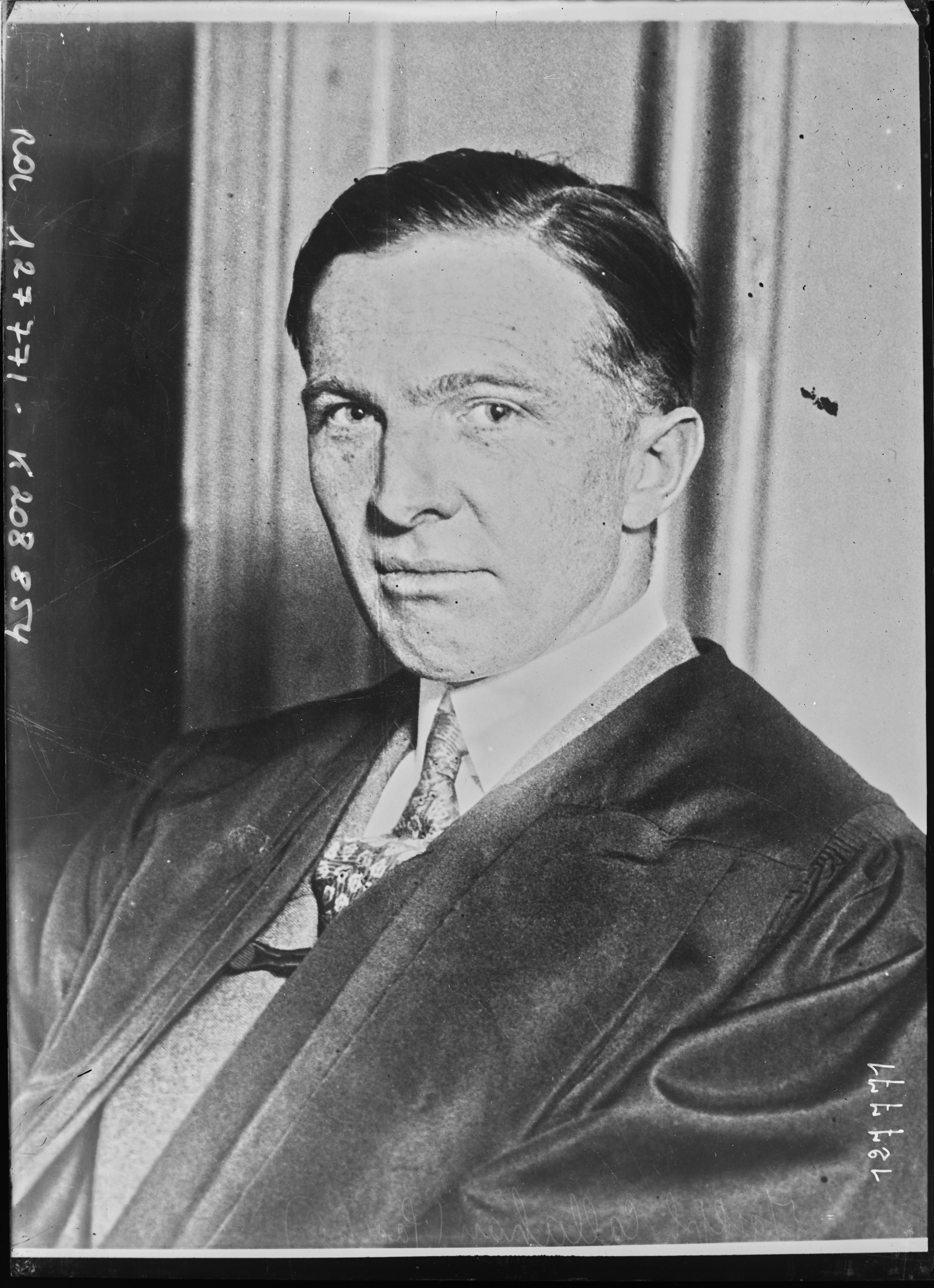
Joseph Callahan (1928)

Joseph Michael Callahan (December 10, 1885 – January 16, 1973) was an American lawyer and politician from New York.

== Life ==
He was born on December 10, 1885, in New York City, the son of William Callahan and Margaret Lehan Callahan. He graduated from the College of the City of New York, and from New York Law School. He was admitted to the bar in 1907, and practiced law in New York City. In 1909, he married Elizabeth Alice Madden (1886–1938), and they had seven children.

Callahan entered politics as a Democrat, and was a member of the New York State Assembly (New York Co., 35th D.) in 1915, 1916 and 1917. He was Minority Leader in 1916 and 1917.

He was elected as Clerk of Bronx County in November 1917, and took office in January 1918. In November 1919, he was elected to the New York City Court. In January 1920, he resigned as County Clerk and took his seat on the bench. He resigned from the City Court in October 1926, and in November was elected to the New York Supreme Court. From 1937 to 1955, he sat on the Appellate Division (1st Dept.). In May 1955, he tendered his resignation, effective July 1.

From 1958 to 1958, he headed a Moreland Act Commission to investigate the workmen compensation system; and in 1960 was chosen Chairman of the New York City Board of Ethics.

He died on January 16, 1973, at his home in Southampton, Suffolk County, New York; and was buried at the Gate of Heaven Cemetery in Hawthorne.

His daughter Eleanor was married to Congressman James C. Healey (1909–1981).

New York State Assembly
Preceded by Henry D. Patton	New York State Assembly; New York County, 35th District; 1915–1917	Succeeded by district abolished
Preceded by Al Smith	Minority Leader in the New York State Assembly; 1916–1917	Succeeded by Charles D. Donohue
