= Peter J. McGarry =

American politician

Peter J. McGarry (1871 in County Roscommon, Ireland – December 29, 1940 in Queens, New York City) was an American politician from New York.

== Life ==
The family immigrated to the United States in 1880, and settled in Long Island City. He engaged in the real estate and insurance business, and entered politics as a Democrat.

McGarry was a member of the New York State Assembly (Queens Co., 2nd D.) in 1914, 1915, 1916, 1917 and 1918.

He was a member of the New York State Senate (3rd D.) from 1919 to 1926, sitting in the 142nd, 143rd, 144th, 145th, 146th, 147th, 148th and 149th New York State Legislatures.

He was Register of Queens County from 1927 to 1932; and Sheriff of Queens County from 1933 to 1935.

He died on December 29, 1940, at his home at 425 Beach 138th Street in Belle Harbor, Queens, after an illness of four days; and was buried at the Calvary Cemetery there. He never married.

== Sources ==
- PETER J. M'GARRY, EX-STATE SENATOR in NYT on December 31, 1940 (subscription required)
- Peter J. McGarry, Former State Legislator and Queens Sheriff in Brooklyn Daily Eagle on December 31, 1940

New York State Assembly
| Preceded by Alfred J. Kennedy | New York State Assembly; Queens County, 2nd District; 1914–1918 | Succeeded by Bernard Schwab |
New York State Senate
| Preceded by Thomas H. Cullen | New York State Senate; 3rd District; 1919–1926 | Succeeded by Alfred J. Kennedy |
