= Morris S. Halliday =

American lawyer and politician (1883–1943)

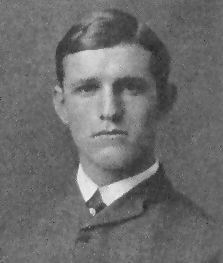
- Halliday, c. 1907

Biographical details
- Born: April 28, 1883
- Died: May 17, 1943 (aged 60); Cleveland, Ohio, U.S.

Playing career
- 1903–1905: Cornell
- Position: Fullback

Coaching career (HC unless noted)
- 1906: Hamilton
- 1907: Cornell (assistant)

Head coaching record
- Overall: 1–5-2

Morris S. Halliday (April 28, 1883 – May 17, 1943) was an American lawyer and politician who represented the 41st district New York State Senate from 1915 to 1918. He was also a noted college football player at Cornell University during the early 20th century. In 1906, he served as the head football coach at Hamilton College, compiling a record of 1–5–2. Later in life, Halliday worked in property management, in Cleveland.

== Early life ==
Halliday was born on April 28, 1883. He was the son of Samuel D. Halliday an Ithaca, New York lawyer who graduated from Cornell in 1870. The younger Halliday attended public schools through high school in Ithaca.

== College ==
Halliday attended college at Cornell University in Ithaca, New York where he graduated in 1906 with a law degree. While at Cornell he lettered in football under coach Bill Warner in 1903, and Bill's brother Pop Warner in 1904 and 1905. During his career he was one of the first football player to wear a helmet to protect his head during the game. The 1903 team won the first six games before losing three of the last four games and finishing with a 6–3–1 record. During the 1903 season Halliday had to sit out several weeks due to injury. He helped the Big Red to a 7–3 record in 1904 and a 6–4 in 1905. Halliday's leadership led him to be selected as president of the Quill and Dagger society.

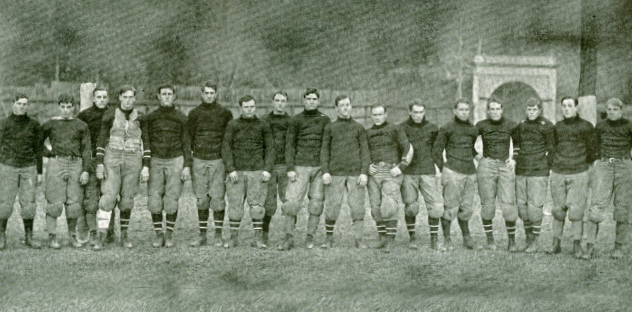
1904 Cornell varsity football team: Halliday is the third from the left.

== Coaching career ==
After graduating from Cornell, Halliday became head football coach at Hamilton College for the 1906 season. That season, team compiled a record of 1–5–2.

The following year, while practicing law in Ithaca, he became an assistant coach at Cornell under Henry Schoellkopf. This assistant coach position was part of a new system implemented by the university's Athletic Council to run the football program after Pop Warner left. The council created a "field committee" of three people to be charge of coaching the 1907 season. The committee was set up to consist of the captain of the team and two former players who have earned a varsity football letter. Halliday along with head coach Henry Schoellkopf were named as the former players while George Tandy Cook was named as the captain. The team finished with a record of 8–2 including a victory over national power Princeton and losses to Penn and Penn State.

=== Head coaching record ===
Year	Team	Overall	Conference	Standing	Bowl/playoffs
Hamilton Continentals (Independent) (1906)
1906	Hamilton	1–5–2			
Hamilton:		1–5–2			
Total:		1–5–2			

== Political career ==
A Republican, Halliway was elected District Attorney of Tompkins County in 1909, and was re-elected in 1912. He was a member of the New York State Senate (41st D.) from 1915 to 1918, sitting in the 138th, 139th, 140th and 141st New York State Legislatures. On March 1, 1918, he resigned his seat to join the aviation section of the U.S. Army Signal Corps.

== Later life ==
Halliway went to officers training in the Aviation Division of Signal Air Corps Reserve in San Antonio, Texas. He earned a rank of Lieutenant. He was discharged from the Air Service in 1919 and returned to Ithaca. He set up a law practice with fellow Cornell alumni John Alfred Kelly and E. Morgan St. Johns.

Later he moved to Cleveland, where he was assistant vice president of Union Trust Company. He also led the Cleveland Association of Manager and Owners of Building for a time. He died after a short illness on May 16, 1943. At the time of his death, he was President of the Union Lennox Company and owner of the Union Commerce Building, the largest bank building in Cleveland.

Political offices
Preceded by John F. Murtaugh	New York State Senate; 41st District; 1915–1918	Succeeded by Seymour Lowman
