= Jacob Goldstein (politician) =

American lawyer and politician

Jacob Goldstein (May 27, 1891 – February 12, 1920) was a Jewish-American lawyer and politician from New York City.

== Life ==
Goldstein was born on May 27, 1891, in New York City, New York, the son of Austrian immigrants Morris L. Goldstein and Rebecca Hochheiser.

Goldstein attended public schools and graduated from DeWitt Clinton High School in 1907, when he received an Alliance Française medal of scholarship and a state scholarship from Cornell University. Despite the latter scholarship, he went to the Evening Law School of New York University while working at the law firm of Marx, Houghton and Byrne. He received the faculty prize for scholarship while attending the Law School and graduated from there with a Bachelor of Laws in 1910, when he was nineteen. When he was admitted to the bar two years later, he immediately began working as a lawyer in New York City.

In 1915, he was elected to the New York State Assembly as a Democrat, representing the New York County 31st District. He served in the Assembly in 1916 (when he was the youngest Assembly member) and 1917. While in the Assembly, he introduced the Municipal Ownership Bill and fathered the Harlem Speedway Bill. In January 1918, he was appointed to Manhattan District Attorney Edward Swann's staff as a Deputy Assistant District Attorney.

Goldstein died at home from pneumonia on February 12, 1920. He was buried in Washington Cemetery.

New York State Assembly
Preceded by Aaron A. Feinberg	New York State Assembly; New York County, 31st District; 1916–1917	Succeeded by District Abolished
