= Robert R. Lawson =

American politician

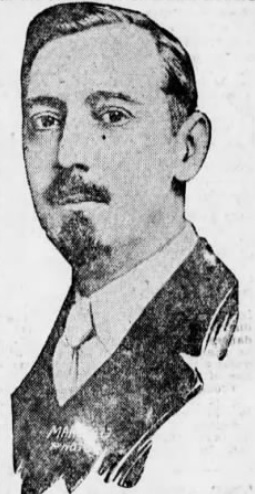
Robert R. Lawson (1916)

Robert R. Lawson (c. 1872 – November 24, 1934) was an American newspaper editor, lawyer and politician from New York.

== Life ==
He was born about 1872 in Brooklyn, Kings County, New York. He was a special correspondent, reporter and editorial writer for several New York City newspapers for about fifteen years. Then he studied law, graduated LL.B. in 1905, and practiced law in Brooklyn.

Lawson was a member of the New York State Senate (9th D.) from 1915 to 1918, sitting in the 138th, 139th, 140th and 141st New York State Legislatures.

In September 1917, he ran in the Republican primary election for Borough President of Brooklyn, but was defeated by the incumbent Lewis H. Pounds who subsequently was defeated for-re-election.

In November 1918, Lawson ran for re-election to the State Senate but was defeated by Democrat Charles E. Russell. The Citizens Union said that "Senator Lawson has continued to demonstrate his unfitness for legislative office," and endorsed his Democratic opponent Russell.

In September 1920, Lawson ran in the Republican primary for Secretary of State of New York but was defeated by John J. Lyons.

Lawson died on November 24, 1934, at his home at 24 Woodbine Street in Brooklyn, after a long illness.

New York State Senate
Preceded by Felix J. Sanner	New York State Senate; 9th District; 1915–1918	Succeeded by Charles E. Russell
