= Henry W. Doll =

American politician

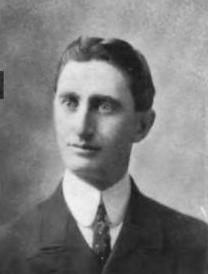
- Doll in 1903

Member of the New York Senate from the 12th district
- In office 1915–1916

Member of the New York State Assembly from the New York County 14th district
- In office 1902–1903

Personal details
- Born: 1870 New York City
- Occupation: Manufacturer and politician

Henry W. Doll (born 1870 in New York City) was an American manufacturer and politician from New York.

== Life ==
He attended public and parochial schools. Then he engaged in the manufacture of cigars.

Doll was a member of the New York State Assembly (New York County, 14th D.) in 1902 and 1903.

He was Sergeant-at-Arms of the New York State Senate in 1913 and 1914.

He was a member of the New York State Senate (12th D.) in 1915 and 1916.

== Sources ==
- Official New York from Cleveland to Hughes by Charles Elliott Fitch (Hurd Publishing Co., New York and Buffalo, 1911, Vol. IV; pg. 345 and 347)
- The New York Red Book by Edgar L. Murlin (1903; pg. 128)

New York State Assembly
Preceded by Louis Meister	New York State Assembly; New York County, 14th District; 1902–1903	Succeeded by Albert C. Wiegand
New York State Senate
Preceded by John C. Fitzgerald	New York State Senate; 12th District; 1915–1916	Succeeded by Jacob Koenig
