= Gustave Hartman =

American politician (1880–1936)

Gustave Hartman (August 12, 1880 – November 12, 1936) was a Hungarian-born Jewish-American lawyer, politician, and judge from New York.

== Life ==
Hartman was born on August 12, 1880, in Hungary, the son of Kalman Hartman and Sarah Luchs.

Hartman immigrated to America at an early age and attended New York City public school. He graduated from the College of the City of New York in 1900 and was the prize speaker of his class. After graduating he began working as a public school teacher in the city. He also taught in evening schools and vacation schools, becoming a principal of a vacation school in 1902. He also attended the New York University School of Law that year. He was awarded the First Faculty Scholarship Prize in high standing for studies in 1903, and in 1904 he became president of his graduating class. He inaugurated a system of lecturing children on Shakespeare plays, and in 1902 the New York City Board of Education appointed him a public lecturer.

In 1904, Hartman was elected to the New York State Assembly as a Republican, representing the New York County 16th District. He was the first Republican to win in that district since 1875 and was elected over Samuel Prince. He served in the Assembly in 1905 and 1906. In the 1908 United States House of Representatives election, he was the Republican candidate in New York's 10th congressional district. He lost the election to Democrat William Sulzer.

Hartman received an LL.M. from the New York University School of Law in 1907 and a J.D. in 1908. He was the law editor of the University "Lex" from 1907 to 1908. He was admitted to the bar in 1905 and began engaging in a law practice afterwards. In September 1913, Mayor Ardolph L. Kline appointed him Justice of the Municipal Court, 2nd District to replace the resigning Justice Leon Sanders. He lost the election that year to keep the seat to Aaron J. Levy, but in November 1913 Mayor appointed him to fill a different seat in the Municipal Court bench to fill a vacancy caused by the death of Thomas Dinnean. He was elected back to the bench in 1914 and served until 1917. He was then elected to the City Court in 1920 and served in that Court until 1929. He unsuccessfully ran for the New York Supreme Court in 1923, 1924, and 1929. He was an alternate delegate to the 1932 Republican National Convention.

Hartman founded the Israel Orphan Asylum in 1913, financing it out of his pocket and running it until his death. The Asylum served the needs of children one to six, later serving girls until the age of fourteen. A majority of children in the Asylum were orphaned by World War I. He was also president of the Hebrew Free Burial Association from 1913 to 1936, a director of a number of Jewish hospitals and benevolent institutions, vice-president of the American Jewish Congress in 1926 and the American ORT from 1927 to 1931, grand master of the Independent Order Brith Abraham from 1919 to 1921 and in 1928, and a delegate to the 1927 World Zionist Congress and World Jewish Congress. He was active in the Jewish Theatrical Guild. He was also an executive committee member of the Zionist Organization of America, vice-president of the Jewish Council of Greater New York, honorary director of the Jewish Memorial Hospital, and a member of the American Bar Association, the New York State Bar Association, the New York County Bar Association, the American Arbitration Association, the National Geographic Society, the Independent Order of B'nai B'rith, the Freemasons, the Knights of Pythias, the Elks, the Modern Woodmen of America, Congregation Ohab Zedek, and Beth Hamedrash Hagodol.

In 1928, Hartman married May Weisser, superintendent of the Israel Orphan Asylum. She took charge of the Asylum after Hartman's death. They had two children, Kenneth Frederick and Suzanne.

Hartman died from a heart ailment in the Israel Orphan Asylum on November 12, 1936. Two funeral services were held for him, with 5,000 people gathered outside the Orphan Asylum and 1,500 in Temple B'nai Jeshurun. The funeral was attended by Mayor Fiorello La Guardia, Representatives William I. Sirovich and Samuel Dickstein, Manhattan Borough President Samuel Levy, Assemblyman Irwin Steingut, New York Supreme Court Justices William T. Collins, Aaron J. Levy, Bernard L. Shientag, and Isidor Wasservogel, General Sessions Judges Morris Koenig and Jonah J. Goldstein, Federal Judge Grover M. Moscowitz, Magistrates Louis B. Brodsky, Peter A. Abeles, Alexander Brough, Nathan D. Perlman, and Adolph Stern, Charles Evans Hughes Jr., Grover Whalen, Rabbi Stephen S. Wise, John F. Curry, and Domestic Relations Court Justice Jacob Panken. Rabbi Israel Goldstein delivered the eulogy. He was buried in Union Field Cemetery in Cypress Hills.

Shortly after Hartman's funeral, the New York City Board of Aldermen named the triangle across the street from the Israel Orphan Asylum the Gustave Hartman Triangle in his honor. It later became a park. In 1950, the Asylum was renamed the Gustave Hartman Home in his honor.

New York State Assembly
Preceded by Samuel Prince	New York State Assembly; New York County, 16th District; 1905–1906	Succeeded by Martin G. McCue
