= Joseph D. Kelly (New York City) =

American lawyer and politician

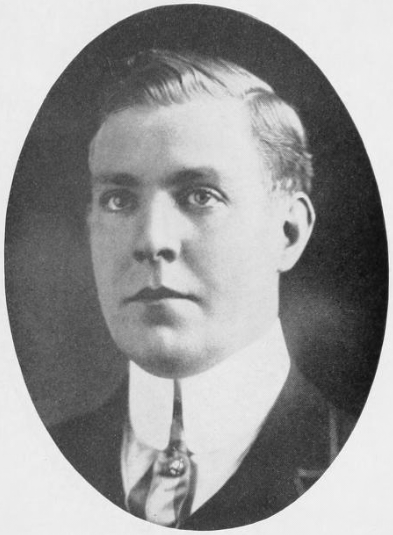

Member of the New York State Senate
- In office 1920
- Constituency: 16th district

Member of the New York State Assembly
- Incumbent
- Assumed office 1913–1917
- Constituency: 12th district

Personal details
- Born: 1887 or 1888 New York, New York, US
- Died: February 6, 1953 (aged 65) New York, New York, US
- Party: Democratic
- Education: New York Law School
- Occupation: Lawyer, politician

Joseph D. Kelly (1887 or 1888 – February 6, 1953) was an American lawyer and politician from New York.

== Early life ==
Joseph D. Kelly was born in New York City, the son of Michael J. Kelly (c. 1854 – 1926) who was Assistant Corporation Counsel of New York City for 22 years. He attended Immaculate Conception School in East 14th Street, in Manhattan, and received an LL.B. degree from New York Law School.

== Career ==
Kelly was a member of the New York State Assembly (New York Co., 12th D.) in 1913, 1914, 1915, 1916 and 1917.

He was a member of the New York State Senate (16th D.) in 1920, elected to fill the vacancy caused by the resignation of James A. Foley.

Kelly was a justice of the New York City Court of Special Sessions from December 1923 to June 1929.

He died at St. Francis Hospital in Manhattan on February 6, 1953.

New York State Assembly
Preceded by James A. Foley	New York State Assembly; New York County, 12th District; 1913–1917	Succeeded by Martin G. McCue
New York State Senate
Preceded by James A. Foley	New York State Senate; 16th District; 1920	Succeeded by Martin G. McCue
