= Fred M. Ahern =

American lawyer and politician

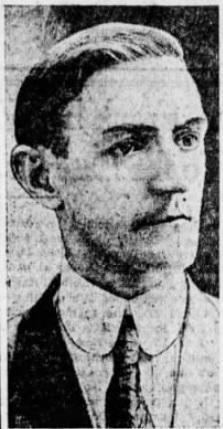
Fred M. Ahern (1916)

Fred M. Ahern (November 6, 1884 – September 17, 1950) was an American lawyer and politician from New York.

== Life ==
He was born on November 6, 1884, in Brooklyn, Kings County, New York. He attended St. James Academy. He graduated from St. Bonaventure College; and LL.B. from Brooklyn Law School in 1907. He practiced law in Brooklyn.

He entered politics as a Republican. He was a member of the New York State Assembly (Kings Co., 10th D.) in 1911, 1912, 1914, 1915, 1916 and 1917. He was Chairman of the Committee on Claims in 1914; Chairman of the Committee on General Laws in 1915; and Chairman of the Committee on Codes in 1916.

He died on September 17, 1950, at the home of his brother John F. Ahern at 51 East 90th Street in Manhattan, of a heart attack.

New York State Assembly
Preceded by Charles Harwood	New York State Assembly; Kings County, 10th District; 1911–1912	Succeeded by George E. Dennen
Preceded by George E. Dennen	New York State Assembly; Kings County, 10th District; 1914–1917	Succeeded by Hoxie W. Smith
