= Martin G. McCue =

American politician

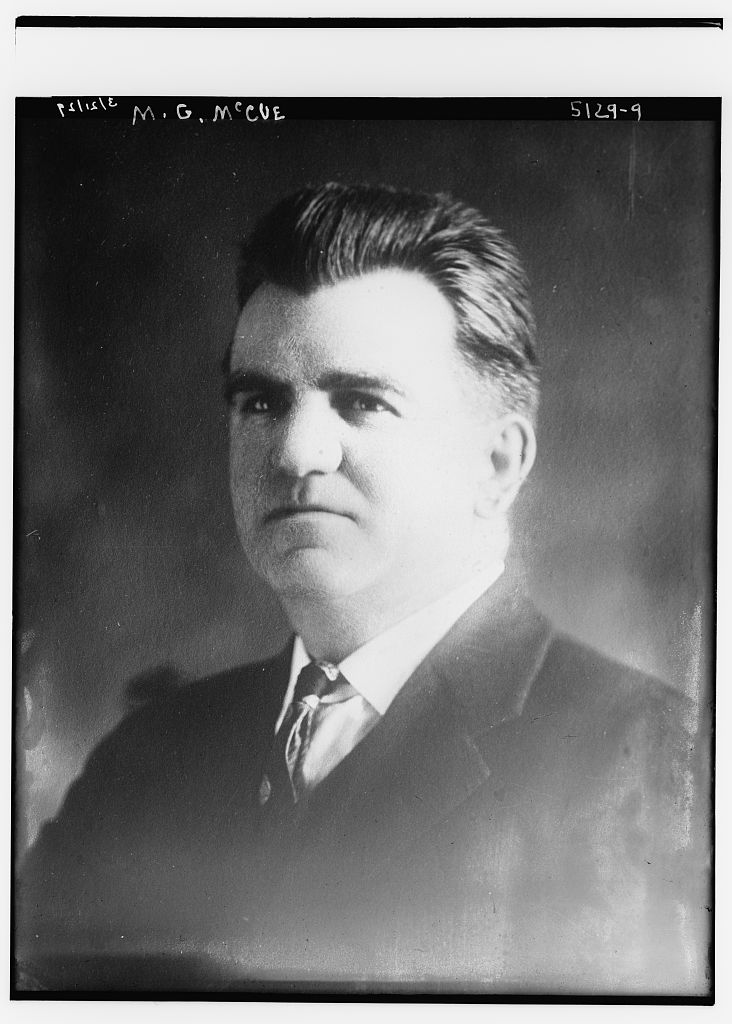
Martin Gabriel McCue in 1920

Martin Gabriel McCue (February 18, 1875 – September 19, 1932) was an American politician from New York.

== Life ==
He was born in Manhattan, New York City, the son of Thomas J. McCue and Ellen (King) McCue. He attended St. Gabriel's Parochial School, and when eleven years old began to work as a newsboy. Then he worked in factories, and became a professional boxer at age 17. Ten years later he left the ring, and opened a cigar store instead. About 1905, he went into the hotel business, and from 1911 to 1921 also engaged in the laundry business. He married Nellie Duane, and they had four children. He entered politics as a member of Tammany Hall, and became Leader of the 12th Assembly District in 1922.

McCue was a member of the New York State Assembly in 1907, 1908, 1909, 1910, 1911, 1912, 1913, 1914, 1915, 1916, 1917, 1918, 1919 and 1920; and was Chairman of the Committee on Commerce and Navigation in 1911, and Chairman of the Committee on Railroads in 1913. The Citizens Union said of McCue that he was "a picturesque member who has the courage and force of his convictions, which are almost always against the public interest."

He was a member of the New York State Senate (16th D.) in 1921. He resigned his seat on June 17, 1921, and was appointed as Clerk of the New York County Surrogate's Court.

He died on September 19, 1932, after having been lying in the French Hospital in Manhattan for seven weeks, and having his left leg amputated in August.

== Sources ==
- Bio transcribed from The History of New York State by Dr. James Sullivan (1927)
- NOMINEES ANALYZED BY CITIZENS UNION in NYT on October 27, 1918
- MARTIN M'CUE DIES; TAMMANY LEADER in NYT on September 19, 1932 (subscription required)

New York State Assembly
Preceded by Gustave Hartman	New York State Assembly; New York County, 16th District; 1907–1917	Succeeded by Maurice Bloch
Preceded by Joseph D. Kelly	New York State Assembly; New York County, 12th District; 1918–1920	Succeeded by John J. O'Connor
New York State Senate
Preceded by Joseph D. Kelly	New York State Senate; 16th District; 1921	Succeeded by Thomas I. Sheridan
