= George E. Dennen =

American journalist and politician

- Born: George Edward Dennen; July 3, 1884; Brooklyn, New York
- Died: October 15, 1966 (aged 82); Floral Park Nursing Home
- Occupations: Reporter and politician

George Edward Dennen (July 3, 1884 – October 15, 1966) was an American reporter and politician from New York.

== Life ==
Dennen was born on July 3, 1884, in the old Twentieth Ward of Brooklyn, New York.

Dennen was one of the first students to attend the Sacred Heart Institute when it opened in 1888, when he was only four years old. After finishing school in 1898, he initially worked in a law office and tried to work in several business enterprises. He eventually entered the printing trade and, after finishing his apprenticeship with the Brooklyn Daily Eagle, he joined the Typographical Union No. 6. In 1907, he became a reporter and started working for the Brooklyn Standard-Union. He covered the Brooklyn Navy Yard, police courts, Special Sessions, and other important assignments for the paper. He edited a special news page about firemen and policemen and promoted legislation that benefited them. He worked for the Standard-Union for twenty-five years, after which he spent ten years working for the Brooklyn Daily Times.

In 1912, Dennen was elected to the New York State Assembly as a Democrat, representing the Kings County 10th District. He was only the second Democrat in eleven years to win in the heavily Republican district, but he won as part of a Democratic landslide that year, was popular in the district, and used the Sunday baseball issue as a campaign slogan. Even though the Standard-Union was a Republican newspaper and its owner William Berri was a prominent Republican who lived in that district, Berri congratulated Dennen for the election victory. He served in the Assembly in 1913, when future Al Smith was Speaker. He was involved in the fight for direct primaries and workmen's compensation laws.

Dennen unsuccessfully ran for re-election to the Assembly in 1913, losing to former Republican Fred M. Ahern. He ran again in 1916, losing the election to Ahern by 23 votes. He remained active in Democratic politics as an election district captain, county committeeman, and a member of the Brooklyn speakers' bureau and the Seneca Club. When Peter A. McArdle retired in 1925, Dennen was Fire Commissioner Thomas J. Drennan and Public Administrator Frank V. Kelly's choice as the Democratic Assembly candidate to succeed McArdle. He was nominated and elected back to the Assembly that year, this time representing the Kings County 4th District. He served in the Assembly in 1926, 1927, 1928, 1929, 1930, 1931, 1932, 1933, and 1934. He worked as secretary to the Commissioner of Borough Works in Brooklyn from 1950 to 1958.

A baseball fan, Dennen played center field in the Standard-Union amateur team and was a friend of Brooklyn Dodgers owner Charles H. Ebbets and Mets owner Casey Stengel. He was a trustee of the Sacred Heart Roman Catholic Church, living in that parish all his life. In 1905, he married May R. Conklin. Their children were George Edward Jr., Francis Xavier, Mary Rita, John Hilary, and Elizabeth Loyola.

Dennen died in the Floral Park Nursing Home on October 15, 1966. He was buried in Mount St. Mary Cemetery in Flushing.

New York State Assembly
Preceded by Fred M. Ahern	New York State Assembly; Kings County, 10th District; 1913	Succeeded by Fred M. Ahern
Preceded by Peter A. McArdle	New York State Assembly; Kings County, 4th District; 1926–1934	Succeeded by Bernard Austin
