= George E. Spring =

American politician (1859–1917)

George Edward Spring (October 27, 1859 in Franklinville, Cattaraugus County, New York – January 25, 1917) was an American lawyer and politician from New York.

== Life ==
He was the son of Judge Samuel Stowell Spring (1823–1875) and Ellen (Hogg) Spring (1827–1897). He was admitted to the bar in 1884, and practiced in Franklinville. He married Rena F. Allen (1861–1943), a daughter of Assemblyman Andrew L. Allen. Their son was Harold Allen Spring (1890–1986).

Spring was a member of the New York State Senate (51st D.) from 1915 until his death, sitting in the 138th and 139th New York State Legislatures. In November 1916, he was re-elected, but was already lying ill in Johns Hopkins Hospital in Baltimore. He did not attend the session of the 140th New York State Legislature, and died less than a month into his second term, on January 25, 1917. He was buried at the Mount Prospect Cemetery in Franklinville.

== Sources ==
- New York Red Book (1916; pg. 109)
- State Senator Spring Is Dying in NYT on January 6, 1917

New York State Senate
Preceded by Frank N. Godfrey	New York State Senate; 51st District; 1915–1917	Succeeded by J. Samuel Fowler
