= William P. Greiner =

American politician

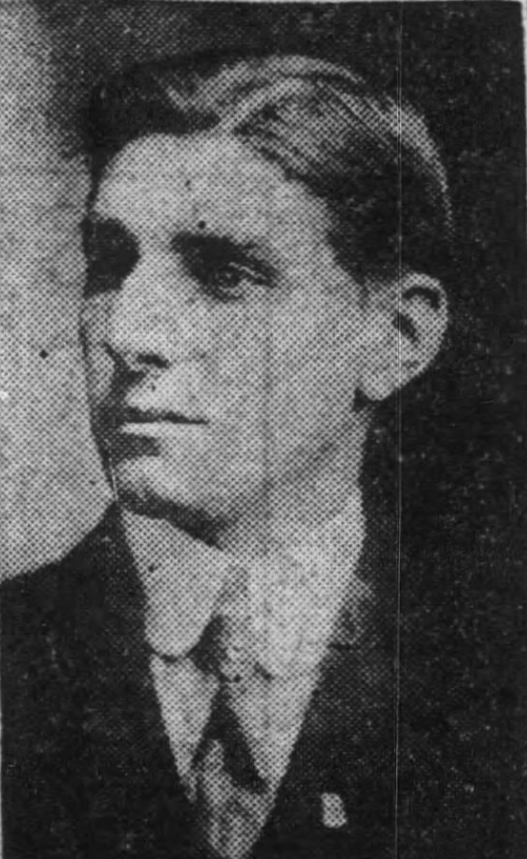
New York State Senator William P. Greiner in a 1918 campaign advertisement.

William P. Greiner was an American politician from New York.

== Life ==
He was born on his father's farm in Darien, Genesee County, New York. There he attended the district schools, and worked on the family farm. At the age of 12, he went to Buffalo, and became a builder and contractor.

Greiner was a member of the New York State Assembly (Erie Co., 7th D.) in 1914. He was a member of the New York State Senate (50th D.) in 1915 and 1916. In 1922, he ran for Congress in the 41st District, but was defeated by Republican Clarence MacGregor.

In 1923, Greiner moved to Long Beach, California, where he continued to engage in building, including the construction of a home for wayward children. Grenier suffered financial difficulties during the Great Depression, and was forced to relocate the home in 1933.

Greiner had two daughters of his own, but raised more than a dozen orphaned or abandoned children before opening his children's home.

New York State Assembly
Preceded by Joseph Vincent Fitzgerald	New York State Assembly; Erie County, 7th District; 1914	Succeeded by John F. Heim
New York State Senate
Preceded by Gottfried H. Wende	New York State Senate; 50th District; 1915–1916	Succeeded by Leonard W. H. Gibbs
