= James E. Towner =

American politician

James Edwin Towner (May 29, 1851 – January 22, 1935) was an American politician from New York.

== Life ==
He was born on May 29, 1851, in Towners, a hamlet in the Town of Patterson, Putnam County, New York, the son of Samuel Towner and Huldah (Wyatt) Towner. He attended the public schools, and graduated from Eastman Business College in Poughkeepsie. He then became an auctioneer. On May 15, 1872, he married Philanda "Linnie" Elizabeth Nichols (1852–1931), and they had eight children.

He entered politics as a Republican, and was at times a Justice of the Peace, School Commissioner of Putnam County, a U.S. Customs Inspector, and a New York City real estate appraiser.

Towner was elected to the New York State Senate in 1913 to fill the vacancy caused by the resignation of Franklin D. Roosevelt, and took his seat in the 136th New York State Legislature near the end of the special session on December 8. He remained in the State Senate until 1922, sitting in the 137th, 138th, 139th, 140th, 141st (all six 26th D.), 142nd, 143rd, 144th, and 145th New York State Legislatures (all four 28th D.).

He died on January 22, 1935, at his home in Towners; and was buried at the Patterson Baptist Churchyard.

New York State Senate
| Preceded by Franklin D. Roosevelt | New York State Senate; 26th District; 1913–1918 | Succeeded by Walter W. Law, Jr. |
| Preceded by Henry M. Sage | New York State Senate; 28th District; 1919–1922 | Succeeded by J. Griswold Webb |
