= Henry E. H. Brereton =

American politician

Henry Edwin Harmar Brereton (July 12, 1865 – May 13, 1957) was an American politician from New York.

== Life ==
He was born on July 12, 1865, in Pittsburgh, Pennsylvania, the son of Capt. Thomas John Brereton (1822–1870) and Amelia Mellizena (Denny) Brereton.

The family moved to Yonkers, New York where Henry's father died in 1870.

Henry Brereton studied at the Bussey Institution from 1891 to 1892, and then settled on the shore of Lake George in Warren County, New York where he engaged in agriculture, forestry, and the real estate business. He married Helena Loup.

Brereton was a member of the New York State Assembly (Warren Co.) in 1911, 1912, 1913, 1914, 1915, 1916 and 1917; and was Chairman of the Committee on Privileges and Elections from 1914 to 1916.

On October 18, 1921, he married his second cousin Elizabeth Denny Gregg (born 1877).

Brereton was a member of the New York State Senate (33rd D.) from 1927 to 1932, sitting in the 150th, 151st, 152nd, 153rd, 154th and 155th New York State Legislatures.

He died on May 13, 1957, at his home in Diamond Point, New York, after a long illness.

Mayor of Pittsburgh and Congressman Harmar Denny (1794–1852) was his grandfather.

New York State Assembly
Preceded by Daniel P. De Long	New York State Assembly; Warren County; 1911–1917	Succeeded by Frank C. Hooper
New York State Senate
Preceded by Mortimer Y. Ferris	New York State Senate; 32nd District; 1927–1932	Succeeded by Benjamin F. Feinberg
