= Ross Graves =

American politician

Ross Graves (August 27, 1874 in Albany, New York – April 1, 1940 in Dunkirk, New York) was an American businessman and politician from New York.

== Life ==
Graves was the son of John J. Graves (1840–1921) and Sarah (Seath) Graves (1844–1917). The family moved to Baltimore, Maryland, while Ross was still a child, and later to Buffalo, New York.

He was a member of the New York State Assembly (Erie Co., 2nd D.) in 1915 and 1916. He was also a member of the New York State Senate (48th D.) from 1917 to 1919, sitting in the 140th, 141st and 142nd New York State Legislatures. He resigned his seat on December 27, 1919, having been elected Commissioner of Finance and Accounts of the City of Buffalo in November 1919.

He took office as Commissioner in January 1920, and was re-elected in November 1923. In November 1925, he ran on a "dry" ticket for Mayor of Buffalo, but was defeated by the "wet" incumbent Frank X. Schwab.

He was buried at the Forest Lawn Cemetery in Buffalo.

== Sources ==
- New York Red Book (1917; pg. 120)
- Niagara Frontier (Vol. 3; 1931; pg. 223)
- Dunkirk Evening Observer (April 2, 1940)
- Hooded Knights on the Niagara: The Ku Klux Klan in Buffalo, New York by Shawn Lay (pg. 27ff)

New York State Assembly
Preceded by Clinton T. Horton	New York State Assembly; Erie County, 2nd District; 1915–1916	Succeeded by John W. Slacer
New York State Senate
Preceded by Clinton T. Horton	New York State Senate; 48th District; 1917–1919	Succeeded by Parton Swift
