= Samuel A. Jones =

American politician (1861–1937)

Samuel A. Jones (May 16, 1861 in New Berlin, Chenango County, New York – January 25, 1937) was an American politician from New York.

== Life ==
He graduated from Oxford Academy in 1885. Then he studied law for two years, but abandoned this and became a merchant in Norwich instead. In 1886, he married Clara B. Barstow, and they had two children. He was Postmaster of Norwich from 1892 to 1899.

Jones was a member of the New York State Assembly (Chenango Co.) in 1914. He was a member of the New York State Senate (37th D.) in 1915 and 1916; and was Chairman of the Committee on Affairs of Villages.

He died in the Chenango Memorial Hospital following a heart attack.

== Sources ==
- New York Red Book (1916; pg. 99)

New York State Assembly
Preceded by Walter A. Shepardson	New York State Assembly; Chenango County; 1914	Succeeded by Bert Lord
New York State Senate
Preceded by Ralph W. Thomas	New York State Senate; 37th District; 1915–1916	Succeeded by Adon P. Brown
