= James A. Emerson =

American politician

James Alfred Emerson (April 25, 1865 in Warrensburg, Warren County, New York – January 31, 1922 in Brooklyn, New York City) was an American banker and politician from New York.

== Life ==
He was the son of Albert C. Emerson (1829–1888) and Abigail J. (Woodward) Emerson (1829–1899). He married Margaret Jane McGregor (1877–1920), and their only child was Albert Louis Emerson (1902–1963).

Emerson was a member of the New York State Senate from 1907 to 1918, sitting in the 130th, 131st (both 32nd D.), 132nd, 133rd, 134th, 135th, 136th, 137th, 138th, 139th, 140th and 141st New York State Legislatures (all ten 33rd D.).

On January 31, 1922, he returned from a trip to Puerto Rico, and was taken ill aboard the ship. After docking in Brooklyn, he was rushed to the Long Island College Hospital, but died twenty minutes after his arrival there, from "heart disease, aggravated by an attack of gastritis". He was buried at the Warrensburg Cemetery.

Congressman Louis W. Emerson (1857–1924) was his brother.

== Sources ==
- Official New York from Cleveland to Hughes by Charles Elliott Fitch (Hurd Publishing Co., New York and Buffalo, 1911, Vol. IV; pg. 366f)
- EX-SENATOR EMERSON DEAD in NYT on February 3, 1922

New York State Senate
Preceded by George R. Malby	New York State Senate; 32nd District; 1907–1908	Succeeded by Seth G. Heacock
Preceded by Seth G. Heacock	New York State Senate; 33rd District; 1909–1918	Succeeded by Mortimer Y. Ferris
