= Henry S. Schimmel =

American politician

Henry Samuel Schimmel (July 3, 1884 – February 21, 1975) was a Jewish Romanian-American lawyer, politician, and judge.

== Life ==
Schimmel was born on July 3, 1884, in the Kingdom of Romania. He immigrated to the United States in 1886 and settled in New York City, New York. He was naturalized as an American citizen in 1904.

Schimmel graduated from the College of the City of New York in 1903 and from New York University School of Law in 1906. He previously attended DeWitt Clinton High School. He was admitted to the bar in 1906 and became a member of the law firm Cohen, Haas & Schimmel, the successors of Assembly Majority Leader Aaron J. Levy's law firm.

In 1913, Schimmel was elected to the New York State Assembly as a Democrat, representing the New York County 4th District. He served in the Assembly in 1914, 1915, 1916, and 1917. In 1916, he successfully ran for the Assembly with support from the Democratic Party, the Independence League, and the Progressive Party. His district was on the Lower East Side. He was a Justice on the Municipal Court from 1924 to 1927. He was elected to the City Court in the latter year, and was re-elected in 1937 and 1947. He retired as City Court Justice in 1955.

Schimmel died at home on February 21, 1975. His widow's name was Katherine.

New York State Assembly
Preceded by Aaron J. Levy	New York State Assembly; New York County, 4th District; 1914–1917	Succeeded by William Karlin
