= John J. Robinson (politician) =

American lawyer and politician

John J. Robinson (May 10, 1888 – September 3, 1934) was an American lawyer and politician from Centerport, New York.

== Life ==
Robinson was born on May 10, 1888 in Brooklyn, New York, the son of John J. and Mary E. Robinson.

Robinson attended parochial schools in Brooklyn and St. Francis Xavier school in Manhattan. He began attending the College of the Holy Cross in Worcester, Massachusetts in 1906, but he left after his freshman year due to poor health. When his health recovered that fall, he entered Brooklyn Law School and graduated from there with an LL.B. in 1909. He was admitted to the bar in 1910 and opened an office in the Singer Building in New York City. He moved to Centerport in 1907 and opened a branch office in Huntington in 1911. In 1912, he was elected to the New York State Assembly as a Democrat, representing the Suffolk County 2nd District. He served in the Assembly in 1913.

In 1913, Robinson moved his New York City law office to the Woolworth Building while still maintaining his Huntington office. In 1914, he was appointed attorney for the State Comptroller in transfer tax matters in Suffolk County. He served in that position until 1915. In 1930, he moved his law office to the Lincoln Building. In 1932, he was the Democratic candidate for Suffolk County District Attorney. He lost the election to Republican candidate L. Barron Hill. In August 1934, he was named leader of the Suffolk County Democratic Party.

In 1912, Robinson married Marie L. Metzner at St. Joseph's Church in Lake Ronkonkoma, with Bishop George W. Mundelein officiating the wedding. They had two children, John J. Jr. (a Notre Dame Fighting Irish football player) and Adele M. (a Trinity College student).

Robinson died at home from a heart attack on September 3, 1934, only two weeks after he was elected chairman of the Suffolk County Democratic Party. Bishop Thomas E. Molloy and other members of the Catholic clergy officiated the funeral at St. Patrick's Church in Huntington, with the Gate of Heaven Council of the Knights of Columbus (which Robinson was an officer of for many years) serving as the ushers. He was buried in the West Neck Catholic Cemetery.

New York State Assembly
Preceded by George L. Thompson	New York State Assembly; Suffolk County, 2nd District; 1913	Succeeded by Henry A. Murphy
