= Frank Aranow =

Frank Aranow (May 19, 1883 – February 27, 1971) was a Belarusian-born Jewish-American lawyer and politician from New York City.

== Life ==
Aranow was born on May 19, 1883, in Minsk, Minsk Governorate, Russian Empire, son of Max Aranow and Pauline Slepien.

Aranow immigrated to America and lived in New York City. He attended P.S. 70, DeWitt Clinton High School, and New York Law School. He was a lawyer and part of the law firm Koenig, Goldsmith & Sittenfield, which Secretary of State of New York Samuel S. Koenig was the senior member of. He also taught at the Emmanuel Brotherhood in the Lower East Side, helped raise funds for the Lebanon Hospital building, and served as an organizer of the Darrach Home for Crippled Children.

In 1914, Aranow was elected to the New York State Assembly as a Democrat, representing the New York County 20th District. He served in the Assembly in 1915, 1916, and 1917. While in the Assembly, he was a member of the legislative committee to revise the Code of Civil Procedure and enact the Civil Practice Act. Starting in 1927, he practiced law with Harris Berlack. He received the Croix de Valour from Portugal in 1932. In 1941, he was the Betty Compton's attorney in her divorce from former New York City mayor Jimmy Walker.

In 1915, Aranow married Blanche Bodenheimer, daughter of Max Bodenheimer. They had one son, Richard Frank.

Aranow died at his Springdale home on February 27, 1971. He lived there since around 1930.

New York State Assembly
Preceded by Patrick J. McGrath	New York State Assembly; New York County, 20th District; 1915–1917	Succeeded by Charles A. Winter
