= William J. Heffernan =

American politician

William J. Heffernan (September 21, 1872 in Brooklyn, Kings County, New York – February 8, 1955 in Brooklyn, New York City) was an American politician from New York.

== Life ==
He married Mary A. Lynch (died 1944).

Heffernan was a member of the New York State Senate (5th D.) from 1913 to 1918, sitting in the 136th, 137th, 138th, 139th and 140th New York State Legislatures. He did not attend the session of the 141st New York State Legislature, and sent a letter of resignation, dated January 1, 1918, which was read in the Senate on January 9. He resigned his seat to accept an appointment as Deputy Clerk of Kings County, at a much higher salary than a state senator's.

He led an unsuccessful campaign for an elected office representing New Utrecht, Brooklyn, in 1927.

He was a member of the New York City Board of Elections from 1931 to 1952.

Congressman James J. Heffernan (1888–1967) was his brother.

== Sources ==
- Journal of the Senate (141st Session) (1918; pg. 17)
- MRS. WM. J. HEFFERNAN in NYT on May 28, 1944
- SINNOTT DEFEATED IN VOTE OVER JOB in NYT on September 17, 1952 (subscription required)
- W. J. HEFFERNAN, BROOKLYN LEADER in NYT on February 9, 1955 (subscription required)

New York State Senate
Preceded by Barth S. Cronin	New York State Senate; 5th District; 1913–1918	Succeeded by Daniel F. Farrell
