= William S. Evans =

American politician

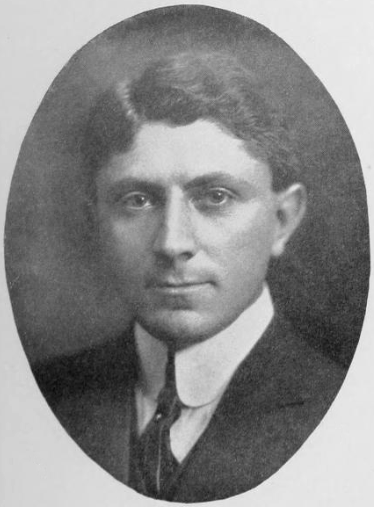

Member of the New York State Assembly
- In office 1919–1920
- Constituency: 5th district

Member of the New York State Assembly
- In office 1915–1917
- Constituency: 32nd district

Personal details
- Born: William Simon Evans; July 15, 1884 Russian Empire
- Died: October 10, 1984 (aged 100) Boca Raton, Florida, US
- Party: Democratic; Independence
- Education: College of the City of New York; New York University School of Law
- Occupation: Lawyer, politician, judge

William Simon Evans (July 15, 1884 – October 10, 1984) was a Lithuanian-born Jewish-American lawyer, politician, and judge.

== Life ==
Evans was born on July 15, 1884 in the Russian Empire. He immigrated to the United States when he was a child.

Evans attended New York City public schools. He graduated from the College of the City of New York with a B.A. in 1906, followed by New York University School of Law with an LL.B. in 1908. He was admitted to the bar later in 1908. He taught in New York City schools from 1906 to 1910, after which he began practicing law. In 1913, he became a member of the law firm Almy, Van Gordon, Evans & Kelly.

In 1913, Evans unsuccessfully ran for the New York State Assembly as a Democrat in the New York City 32nd District in Bronx County to his Republican opponent. In 1914, he was elected in that district, and while his opponent had the Republican, Independence League, and Progressive nominations he still won with a majority of nearly 4,000, the largest any New York City assemblyman received until that point. He served in the Assembly in 1915, 1916 (winning the previous election with over 5,500 votes and the endorsement of the Citizens Union and the labor organizations), and 1917 (winning the previous election with support from the Independence League). While in the Assembly, he worked for a New Workmen's Insurance Law, laws protecting New York City's water supply from pollution, a fair distribution of highway and stock transfer to New York City, and the amelioration of the drug evil. He also advocated reforms in the state's "spendthrift" trust laws, his measures passing in the Assembly for three terms only to meet opposition in the Senate. In 1917, he introduced a resolution for a legislative committee to investigate and report on the advisability of municipal ownership of public utilities by New York City, and was part of the Joint Legislative Committee for the Simplification of the Code of Civil Procedures. He also supported women's suffrage. He lost the 1917 election to Socialist Charles B. Garfinkel, but in the 1918 election he defeated Garfinkel and was elected to the Bronx County 5th District with the endorsement of both the Democratic and Republican Parties. He again served in the Assembly in 1919 and 1920.

In 1920, Evans became the center of controversy when he dissented from a Judiciary Committee report that called for the expulsion of five Assembly members who were Socialist and banning the Socialist Party in the state. He also led opposition to a bill that assailed the Rand School of Social Science as "a breeder of socialism." He served as a justice on the City Court of New York from 1926 to 1954, when he reached the mandatory retirement age of 70. The City Court later merged with the New York City Civil Court. He then returned to his law practice and served as a hearing officer and referee in civil cases into his 80s.

Evans was vice-president of Zeta Beta Tau. In July 1984, the New York State Bar Association honored him on his 100th birthday. His son Martin was a Justice on the New York Supreme Court.

Evans died in Boca Raton Hospital on October 10, 1984. He was living in Boca Raton, Florida at the time. He was buried in Boca Raton Municipal Cemetery and Mausoleum.

New York State Assembly
Preceded by Louis P. Grimler	New York State Assembly; New York County, 32nd District; 1915–1917	Succeeded by District Abolished
Preceded by Charles B. Garfinkel	New York State Assembly; Bronx County, 5th District; 1919–1920	Succeeded by William Lyman
