= Mark Goldberg (politician) =

American lawyer and politician

Mark Goldberg (c. 1879 – November 20, 1926) was an American lawyer and politician from New York.

== Life ==
Goldberg was born around 1879 in New York City. He lived in Manhattan since he was four and was active in local affairs since he was young.

Goldberg attended New York University Law School, graduating with an L.L. B. in 1898 and a L.L. M. in 1899. After he was admitted to the bar, he opened a law office at 302 Broadway.

In 1906, Goldberg was elected to the New York State Assembly as a Democrat, representing the New York County 18th District. He served in the Assembly in 1907, 1908, 1909, 1910, 1911, 1912, 1913, 1914, 1915, 1916, 1917, 1918, and 1919. While in the Assembly, he fought for and successfully passed the restoration of street car transfers and a cheap telephone rate for Greater New York. In 1913, he was a member of a joint legislative committee that devised legislation to prevent misconduct by the New York City Police Department.

Goldberg had a wife and two children. He was a member of the Elks, the freemasons, the Tammany Society, the Royal Arcanum, the Improved Order of Heptasophs, the Hebrew Sanitarium, the Bohemian-American Congregation, the Independent Order Brith Abraham, and the New York County Lawyers' Association. He was a grand marshal of the children's parade for the Hudson-Fulton Celebration.

Goldberg died in St. Luke's Hospital on November 20, 1926. He was buried in Washington Cemetery.

New York State Assembly
Preceded by Edward B. LaFetra	New York State Assembly; New York County, 18th District; 1907–1917	Succeeded by Owen M. Kiernan
Preceded by Robert Lee Tudor	New York State Assembly; New York County, 14th District; 1918–1919	Succeeded by Edward Healey
