= William H. O'Hare =

American lawyer and politician

William Harold O'Hare (June 7, 1878 – June 5, 1946) was an American lawyer and politician from New York.

== Life ==
O'Hare was born on June 7, 1878, in Brooklyn, New York, the son of cabinet maker William O'Hare and Anna Sheldon. His father was an Irish immigrant from Dublin.

O'Hare attended the New York Preparatory School and Brooklyn Law School. He graduated from the latter school in 1910 and was admitted to the bar later that year. He took his law classes in the evening while spending the day working in a Jersey City railroad company freight yards. He studied law in the office of James Taylor Lewis and Isaac Franklin Russell from 1898 to 1901, Hugo H. Ritterbusch from 1901 to 1904, and the Brooklyn Title Company law department from 1904 to 1911. After he was admitted to the bar, he had a general practice with Charles J. Ryan, Charles A. Kenmore, and Thomas J. Evers at 26 Court Street, Brooklyn. In 1906, he moved to Glendale.

In 1914, O'Hare was elected to the New York State Assembly as a Democrat, representing the Queens County 3rd District. He served in the Assembly in 1915, 1916, 1917, 1918, and 1919. In 1919, he unsuccessfully ran for Municipal Court judge of Brooklyn. During World War I, he served on the local Draft Board. In 1922, he was appointed deputy commissioner of the local State Veterans' Relief Committee. In 1930, he was appointed an assistant District Attorney. He left the position in 1939 after supporting his son Kenneth in a political fight against Joseph F. Mafera. He initially served under District Attorney James T. Hallinan and retired under Charles P. Sullivan.

O'Hare was president of the Blackstone Club of Ridgewood and the Springfield Democratic Club. He was a member of the Elks, the Newtown Exempt Firemen's Association, the Loyal Order of Moose, the Brooklyn Bar Association, the Brooklyn Chamber of Commerce, the Knights of Columbus, and the Foresters. He was involved with the Boy Scouts and was a leading figure for the organization in the Newtown area. He attended the Church of St. Pancras of Glendale. In 1903, he married Emmie Eugene Grauman of Brooklyn. Their children were Harold F., Kenneth W., Alice Elizabeth, and Kathleen Eugene.

O'Hare died in his daughter and son-in-law Mrs. and Assistant District Attorney Edward H. Potter's home in Woodhaven on June 5, 1946. He was buried in Asbury, New Jersey.

New York State Assembly
Preceded by Conrad Garbe	New York State Assembly; Queens County, 3rd District; 1915–1917	Succeeded by John Kennedy
Preceded by District Created	New York State Assembly; Queens County, 6th District; 1918–1919	Succeeded by Henry Baum
