= Robert Lee Tudor =

American politician

Robert Lee Tudor (March 11, 1874 – May 14, 1949) was an American politician from New York.

== Life ==
Tudor was born on March 11, 1874, in Patrick County, Virginia, the son of William Abram Tudor and Martha Jane Lee. His mother was a member of the Lee family. He was born in Critz.

After finishing public school, Tudor began working for the Southern Railroad as a telegrapher and station agent. He then moved to New York City, New York, where he worked as a city ticket agent for the Long Island Railroad. He worked there until 1905, when he started working for the publishing house Taylor, Platt & Company. He was active in politics since around 1898, serving as a member of the Tammany Hall General Committee, vice-president of the Tammany Central Club of the Fourteenth Assembly District, and a speaker of the Tammany Hall Speakers Bureau. In 1912, he was elected to the New York State Assembly as a Democrat, representing the New York County 14th District. He served in the Assembly in 1913 (when he introduced and passed several important bills, including the "Tudor Bill" that required a prospective female employee whose employer required her to undergo a physical examination to be examined by a female physician, a "Dentistry Bill" that remedied abuses caused by irresponsible and unregistered people who concealed their identity under a corporation or trade name, and the "Juvenile Delinquency Measure), 1914, 1915, 1916, and 1917.

Tudor was Deputy Commissioner of Correction from 1918 to 1932 and Acting Commissioner of Correction from 1932 to 1933. In January 1938, he was appointed City Clerk by the New York City Council, which under the new New York City Charter replaced for the former New York City Board of Aldermen. However, then-City Clerk Michael J. Cruise contested the validity of the appointment on the grounds that he still had two more years to serve as City Clerk, with Tudor arguing the new City Charter vacated the office. The two men took the case to court, and would both sign various documents that had to be signed by the City Clerk. Cruise was ultimately judged the duly elected City Clerk, and Tudor resigned from the office in January 1939.

Tudor died from a subdural hematoma at Jefferson Hospital in Roanoke, Virginia, on May 14, 1949. He was buried in the family cemetery in Critz.

New York State Assembly
Preceded by John J. Herrick	New York State Assembly; New York County, 14th District; 1913-1917	Succeeded by Mark Goldberg
