= John La Frenz =

American politician

John Peter La Frenz (February 1, 1876–April 25, 1935) was an American politician from New York.

== Life ==
He was born on February 1, 1876, in Wilmington, New Hanover County, North Carolina. After the death of his father, his mother went with him to live in Brooklyn, Kings County, New York. There he attended the public schools. Afterwards he became a cooper.

La Frenz entered politics as a Democrat. In November 1913, he was elected on the Progressive, Republican and Independence League tickets to the New York State Assembly (Kings Co., 14th D.), defeating the incumbent Democrat James J. Garvey. La Frenz was re-elected three times as a Democrat, and was a member of the State Assembly in 1914, 1915, 1916 and 1917.

New York State Assembly
| Preceded by James J. Garvey | New York State Assembly; Kings County, 14th District; 1914–1917 | Succeeded by Joseph A. Whitehorn |
