= William Bewley (New York politician) =

American businessman and politician (1878–1953)

William Bewley (October 21, 1878 – November 6, 1953) was an American businessman and politician from New York.

== Life ==
He was born on October 21, 1878, in Lockport, Niagara County, New York, the son of Joseph Bewley and Mary (Howe) Bewley. He attended the public schools in Lockport, and Clark's Business School in Buffalo, New York. In 1901, he married Helen Margaret Dickson (died 1921).

Bewley was a member of the New York State Assembly (Niagara Co., 1st D.) in 1914, 1915, 1916, 1917, 1918 and 1919; and was Chairman of the Committee on Labor and Industries from 1916 to 1919.

On November 22, 1922, he married Blanche Lovina Clark. In 1925, he established with his brother a canning factory in Middleport.

He was again a member of the State Assembly in 1927 and 1928.

He was a member of the New York State Senate from 1939 to 1948, sitting in the 162nd, 163rd, 164th, 165th and 166th New York State Legislatures.

He died on November 6, 1953, in Lockport City Hospital in Lockport, New York.

== Sources ==
New York State Assembly
Preceded by Eugene L. McCollum	New York State Assembly; Niagara County, 1st District; 1914–1919	Succeeded by David E. Jeffery
Preceded by Mark T. Lambert	New York State Assembly; Niagara County, 1st District; 1927–1928	Succeeded by Fayette E. Pease
New York State Senate
Preceded by William H. Lee	New York State Senate; 47th District; 1939–1944	Succeeded by Henry W. Griffith
Preceded by new district	New York State Senate; 52nd District; 1945–1948	Succeeded by Earl W. Brydges
