= Abram Ellenbogen =

Abram Ellenbogen (February 26, 1883 – August 1, 1929) was a Jewish-American lawyer, politician, and judge from New York City.

== Life ==
Ellenbogen was born on February 26, 1883, in Troy, New York, the son of Hyman S. Ellenbogen and Lina Rothstein.

Ellenbogen attended Troy High School. He went Harvard College from 1902 to 1906, graduating in the latter year with an A.B. He then went to Harvard Law School, graduating from there with an LL.B. in 1908. He moved to New York City a few months later and began practicing law there as an associate of Churchill and Marlow, 63 Wall Street. He was with them until 1913, when he started an independent practice. A year later, he formed the partnership Ellenbogen and Selig, with offices at the Woolworth Building.

In 1913, Ellenbogen was elected to the New York State Assembly as a Republican, representing the New York County 15th District. He served in the Assembly in 1914, 1915, 1916, 1917, and 1918. He lost the 1918 re-election to the Democratic candidate Mary Lilly. While in the Assembly, he passed a bill that provided for teachers' pensions, which was called the Ellenbogen Bill. He was also chairman of the Cities Committee, abolished fees in the New York City Sheriff's Office, consolidated the Municipal Building Department branches, and sought to improve the treatment of public school teachers.

In 1919, Ellenbogen was elected a Justice of the Municipal Court of the City of New York, Fifth District, Manhattan. He was originally elected to fill an unexpired term, and in 1923 he was re-elected for a full ten-year term. He served as Justice until his death. In 1926, he unsuccessfully ran for Justice of the New York Supreme Court, First Judicial District. He was an alternate delegate to the 1928 Republican National Convention.

In 1919, he married Miriam Isaacs. Her father Reuben Isaacs was the oldest importer and exporter of Japanese products in America.

Ellenbogen died in Lake Placid on August 1, 1929. He was traveling there with his wife to recuperate from a three-week pleurisy illness, but complications developed shortly after arriving there.

New York State Assembly
Preceded by Theodore Hackett Ward	New York State Assembly; New York County, 15th District; 1914–1917	Succeeded by Schuyler M. Meyer
Preceded by Peter P. McElligott	New York State Assembly; New York County, 7th District; 1918	Succeeded by Mary Lilly
