= Walter W. Law Jr. =

American politician

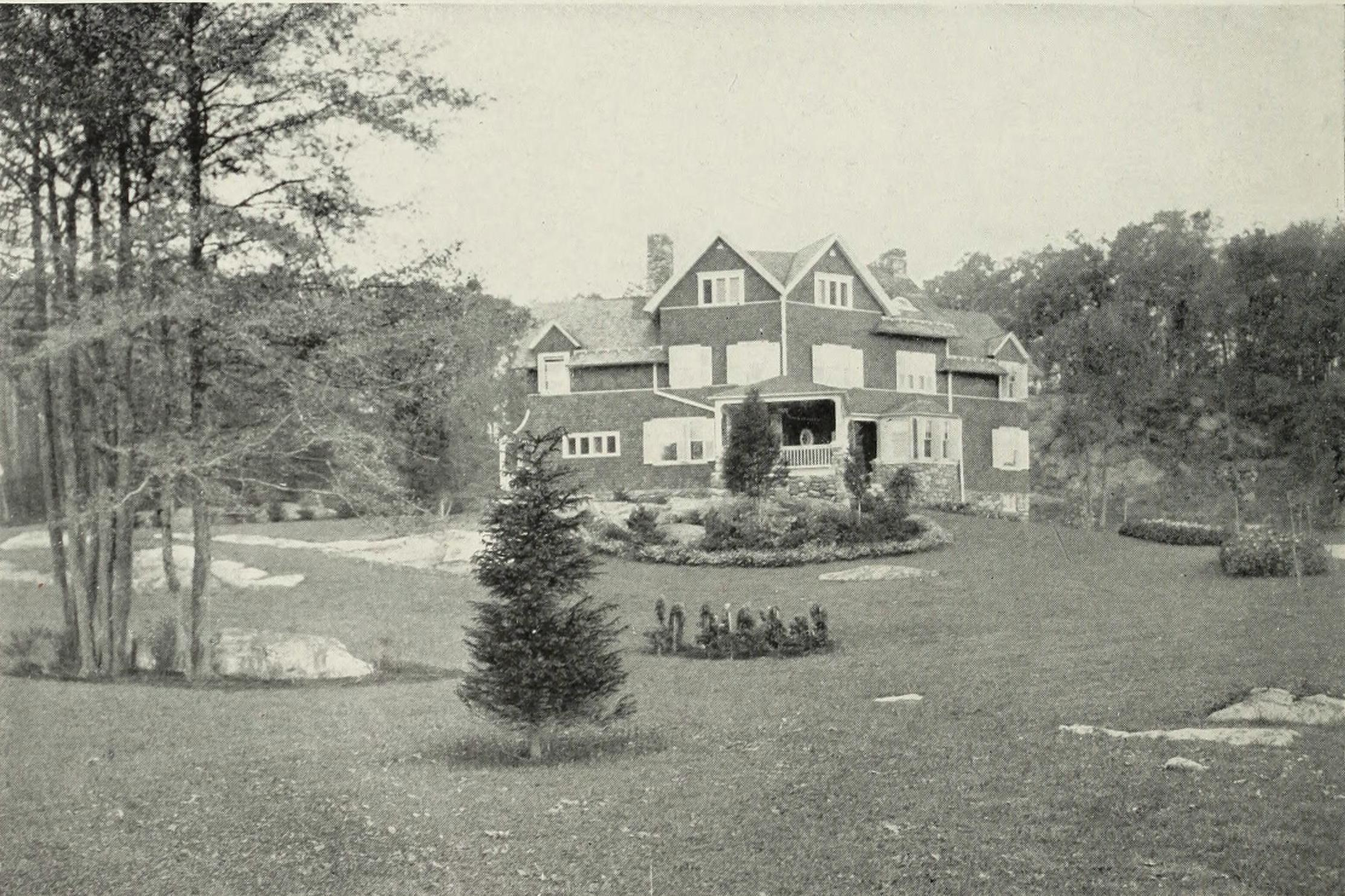
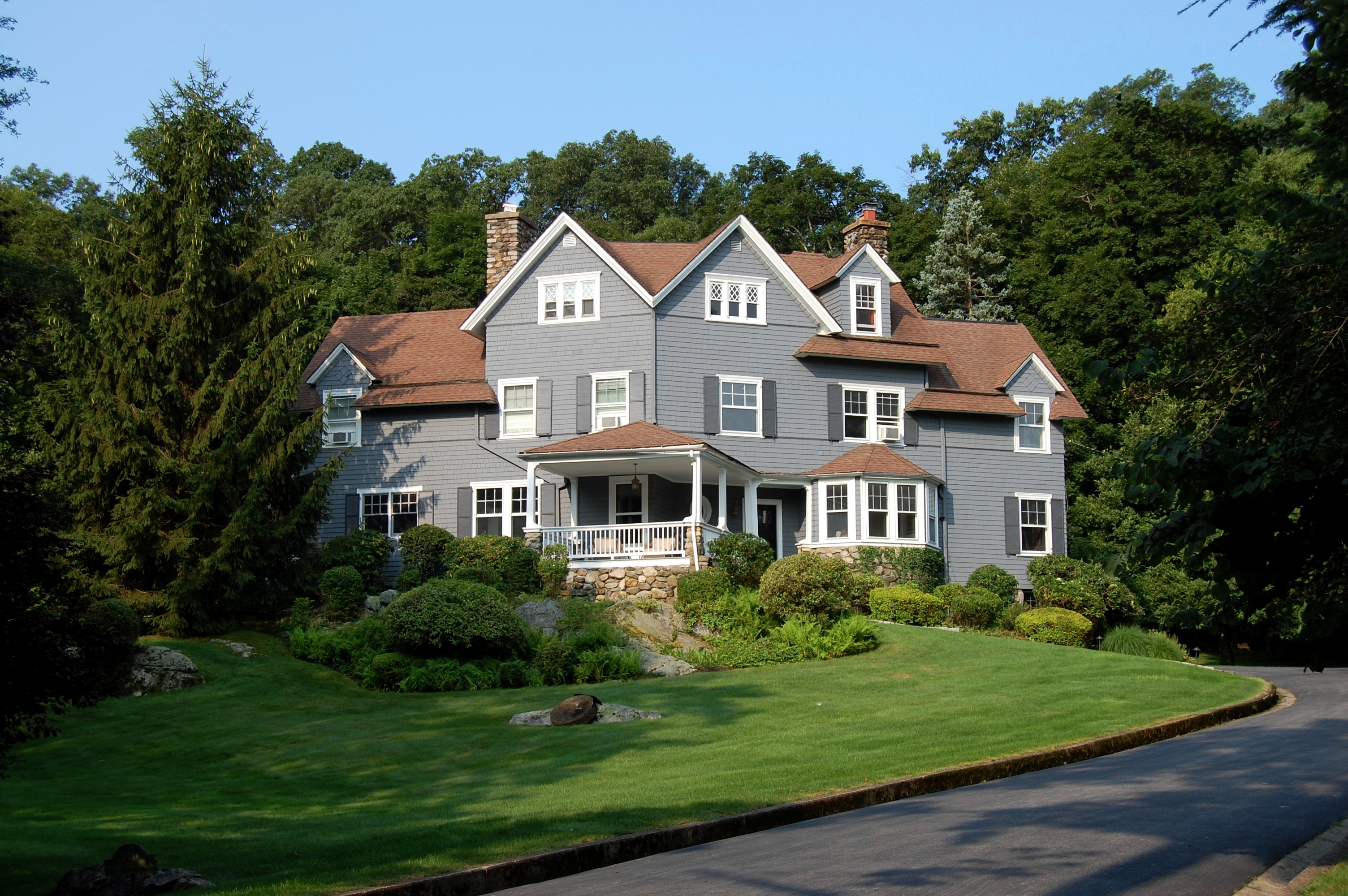
Six Gables, Walter Law's home on Scarborough Road, Briarcliff Manor in 1901 and 2014.

Walter William Law (July 15, 1871 in Westchester County, New York – August 26, 1958) was an American lawyer and politician from Briarcliff Manor, New York. He was President of Briarcliff Manor from 1905 to 1918; he later served in the New York State Legislature and then as President of the New York State Tax Commission.

== Life ==
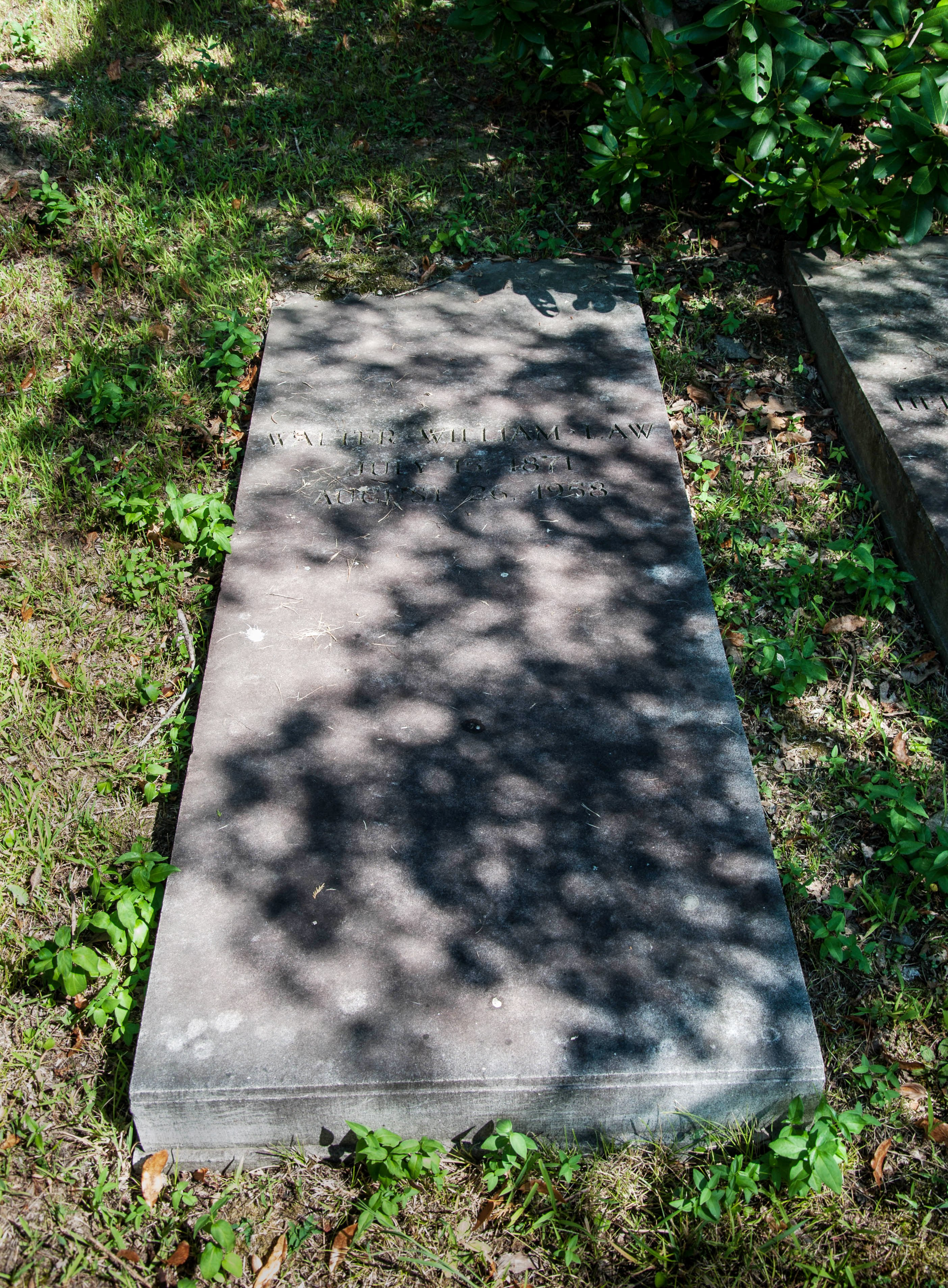
Law's gravestone

He was the son of Walter W. Law (1837–1924), the founder of Briarcliff Manor. He engaged in the real estate business. On April 10, 1901, he married Helen Renfrew Kingman (1880–1949), and they had several children.

Law was a member of the New York State Assembly (Westchester Co., 3rd D.) in 1914, 1915, 1916 and 1917; and was Chairman of the Committee on Penal Institutions in 1915.

He was a member of the New York State Senate (26th D.) in 1919 and 1920.

In 1921, he was appointed by Gov. Nathan L. Miller as President of the New York State Tax Commission. He was removed from office by Gov. Al Smith in January 1923, for misfeasance in office and neglect of duty. According to the charges brought against Law, he did not re-organize the Tax Department, as mandated when he was appointed by Miller; and he spent more money than appropriated by the State Legislature for running the Tax Department.

He died on August 26, 1958, and was buried at Sleepy Hollow Cemetery in Sleepy Hollow, New York.

== Sources ==
- LAW—KINGMAN, his wedding, in NYT on April 11, 1901
- SMITH REMOVES LAW; HOLDS MISFEASANCE CHARGE IS PROVED in NYT on January 31, 1923 (subscription required)
- WALTER W. LAW DIES IN THE SOUTH, his father's obit, in NYT on January 19, 1924 (subscription required)
- HENRY H. LAW DEAD; REAL ESTATE MAN, his brother's obit, in NYT on November 19, 1936 (subscription required)
- MRS. WALTER W. LAW, his wife's obit, in NYT on August 19, 1949 (subscription required)
- WALTER W. LAW, EX-STATE AIDE, 8? in NYT on August 28, 1958 (subscription required)

New York State Assembly
Preceded by Wilson Randolph Yard	New York State Assembly; Westchester County, 3rd District; 1914–1917	Succeeded by William Belknap
New York State Senate
Preceded by James E. Towner	New York State Senate; 26th District; 1919–1920	Succeeded by Holland S. Duell
