= Raymond T. Kenyon =

American dentist and politician

Raymond Taylor Kenyon (October 21, 1878 – November 30, 1929) was an American dentist and politician from New York.

== Life ==
Kenyon was born on October 21, 1878, in Leonardsville, New York, the son of James B. Kenyon, pastor of the local Methodist Episcopal Church, and Margaret. His sister was actress Doris Kenyon.

Kenyon moved to Syracuse with his family when he was young. He graduated from Syracuse High School in 1896. He then attended Syracuse University, the Philadelphia Anatomical School, and the Philadelphia Dental College and Garretson Hospital of Oral Surgery, graduating from the latter in 1900. He was a member of Xi Psi Phi. After practicing as a dentist for a short while in Philadelphia, he moved his practice to Syracuse. A back injury led him to move to the Adriondack area, settling in Au Sable Forks. In 1909, he was elected town supervisor of Jay, serving in that office until 1913. He was postmaster of Au Sable Forks for a short time.

In 1913, Kenyon was elected to the New York State Assembly as a Republican, representing Essex County. He served in the Assembly in 1914, 1915, 1916, 1917, 1918, 1919, and 1920. He was an alternate delegate to the 1924 Republican National Convention.

Kenyon had a daughter, Mrs. Floyd Fitzsimmons. He was a Freemason.

Kenyon died at home of acute angina pectoris on November 30, 1929. He was buried in Fairview Cemetery.

New York State Assembly
Preceded by Spencer G. Prime II	New York State Assembly; Essex County; 1914-1920	Succeeded by Fred L. Porter
