= Peter P. McElligott =

American lawyer and politician (1878–1931)

Peter P. McElligott (September 25, 1878 – January 18, 1931) was an American lawyer and politician from New York.

== Early life and education ==
McElligott was born on September 25, 1878 in the West Side of Manhattan, the son of Thomas and Ellen McElligott.

After attending St. Michael's Parochial School, McElligott began working as a wagon boy for Stern Bros. at the age of 15. After working there for a year, he worked as a finisher's helper at J. B. & J. M. Cornell's iron works, where his father worked for over 20 years. After another year there, he began attending the Manual Labor School at Notre Dame University in Indiana. He worked at the college refectory while attending classes for the next five years. He spent another two years attending as a regular student, receiving a law degree from Notre Dame in 1902. After graduating, he returned to New York City, where he worked as a clerk in a law office and was admitted to the bar in 1904.

== Career ==
In 1908, McElligott was elected to the New York State Assembly as a Democrat, representing the New York County 7th District. He served in the Assembly in 1909, 1910, 1911, 1912, 1913, 1914, 1915, 1916, 1917, 1918, and 1919. While in the Assembly, he was a close friend of Jimmy Walker, who was a member of the Assembly at the same time, and at one point they shared a suite at the Ten Eyck Hotel.

In 1925, McElligott and an attorney named Flannigan bought the law practice of LeRoy M. Young. The firm was later sold to Assistant District Attorney Walter G. Schiel. He later moved to Brightwaters, Suffolk County. He served as a member of the Suffolk Democratic committee and the New York State Democratic Committee.

== Personal life ==
McElligott was married to Rose M. Lynch. Their children were Joseph, Angela, Rose Mary, and Agnes.

== Death ==
McElligott died at home on January 18, 1931. He was buried in Holy Cross Cemetery. The family lived on 428 West Twenty-fourth Street in Chelsea, Manhattan.

New York State Assembly
Preceded by Joseph W. Keller	New York State Assembly; New York County, 7th District; 1909–1917	Succeeded by Abram Ellenbogen
Preceded by Caesar B. F. Barra	New York State Assembly; New York County, 3rd District; 1918–1919	Succeeded by Thomas F. Burchill
