= George F. Thompson =

American politician (1870–1948)

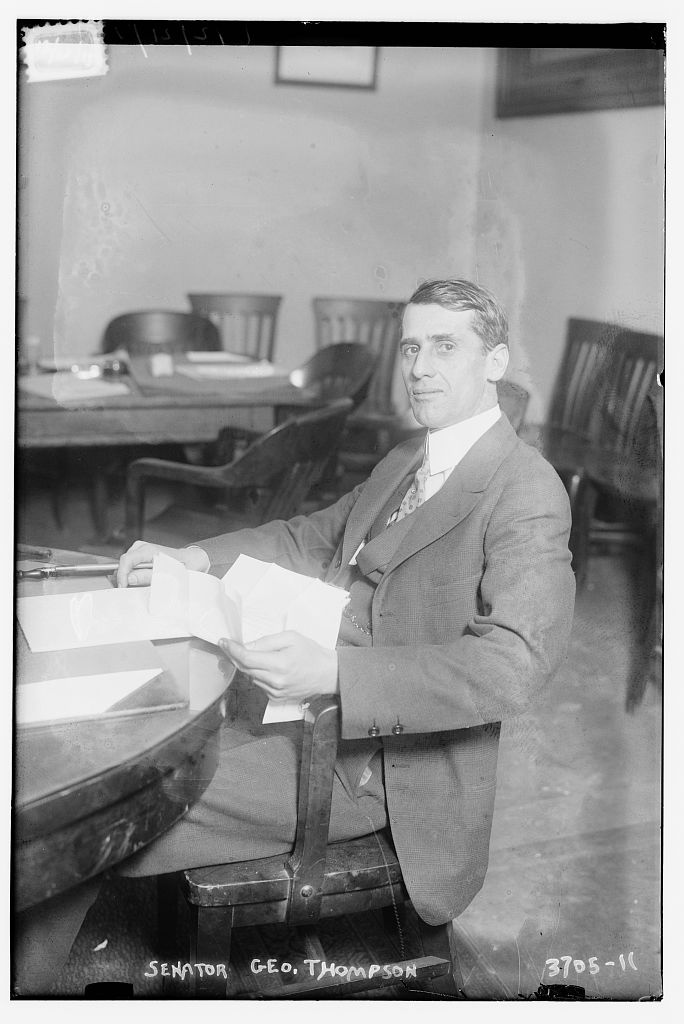
George F. Thompson in 1916

George F. Thompson (July 24, 1870 – June 1948) was an American lawyer and politician from New York.

== Life ==
He was born on July 24, 1870, in Saratoga Springs, New York. His family moved to Royalton in 1883. He studied law, was admitted to the bar in 1893, and practiced law in Middleport. He was elected a Justice of the peace in 1895.

Thompson was a Republican member of the New York State Assembly (Niagara County, 1st District) in 1904 and 1905.

He was a member of the New York State Senate (47th District) from 1913 to 1920, sitting in the 136th, 137th, 138th, 139th, 140th, 141st, 142nd and 143rd New York State Legislatures.

In September 1920, Thompson lost the Republican primary for governor to Nathan L. Miller. In November, he ran at the New York state election, 1920, on the Prohibition ticket for the office but was again defeated by Miller.

== Sources ==
- Official New York from Cleveland to Hughes by Charles Elliott Fitch (Hurd Publishing Co., New York and Buffalo, 1911, Vol. IV; pg. 349 and 351)
- PRIMARY RIVALS CLASH TOMORROW in NYT on September 13, 1920
- G. F. THOMPSON DIES; RAN FOR GOVERNOR in NYT on June 14, 1948 (subscription required)
- Bio transcribed from Landmarks of Niagara County, New York by William Pool (1897)

New York State Assembly
Preceded by Joseph M. Hoffman	New York State Assembly; Niagara County, 1st District; 1904–1905	Succeeded by A. Edmund Lee
New York State Senate
Preceded by Robert H. Gittins	New York State Senate; 47th District; 1913–1920	Succeeded by William W. Campbell
