= Henry A. Murphy =

English-American politician (1867–1936)

Henry Alfred Murphy (July 14, 1867 – October 20, 1936) was an English-American businessman and politician from Huntington, New York.

== Life ==
Murphy was born on July 14, 1867, in London, England, the son of Thomas Murphy. He immigrated to America in 1886 and became a naturalized American citizen in 1895.

Murphy initially lived in Westchester County, New York. In 1909, he moved to Huntington and conducted a real estate and insurance business there. In 1901, he was a General Committee Clerk for the New York State Assembly. In 1913, he was elected to the Assembly as a Republican, representing the Suffolk County 2nd District. He served in the Assembly in 1914, 1915, 1916, 1917, and 1918. He was an alternate delegate to the 1916 Republican National Convention. In 1924, he was appointed Justice of the Peace. He served in that office until the start of 1934.

Murphy attended St. John's Protestant Episcopal Church. He was married to Lavilla May LaCoste. Their children were Cornelius and Mrs. William Chamberlain.

Murphy died from a heart attack on October 20, 1936. He was buried in Huntington Rural Cemetery.

New York State Assembly
Preceded by John J. Robinson	New York State Assembly; Suffolk County, 2nd District; 1914–1918	Succeeded by Ida Sammis
