= DeHart H. Ames =

American politician

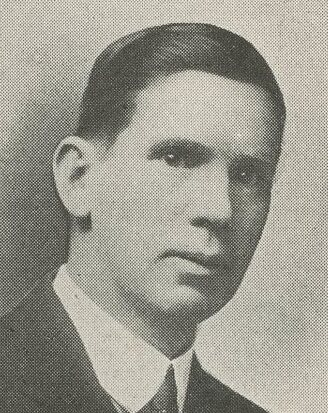
DeHart Henry Ames in 1917

DeHart Henry Ames (January 30, 1872 in Great Valley, Cattaraugus County, New York – October 27, 1955 Ellicottville, New York) was an American businessman and politician from New York.

== Life ==
He was the son of David Edson Ames (1840–1915) and Clementine Carolyn (Hart) Ames (1846–1941). He attended Ten Broeck Academy and Fredonia Normal School. Then he engaged in banking, and later also in the real estate and insurance business, in Franklinville. He was Sheriff of Cattaraugus County, New York from 1907 to 1909.

Ames was a member of the New York State Assembly (Cattaraugus Co.) in 1915, 1916, 1917, 1918, 1919 and 1920; and was Chairman of the Committee on Charitable and Religious Societies in 1918.

He was a member of the New York State Senate (51st D.) from 1921 to 1924, sitting in the 144th, 145th, 146th and 147th New York State Legislatures. In 1921, he sponsored legislation which established the Allegany State Park, and after leaving the Senate became Executive Secretary of the Allegany State Park Commission.

He was a delegate to the New York State Constitutional Convention of 1938.

He died on October 27, 1955, in Ellicottville, New York; and was buried at the Little Valley Rural Cemetery in Little Valley.

== Sources ==
- The Historic Annals of Southwestern New York (Volume 3; 1940)
- Little Valley Rural Cemetery transcriptions

New York State Assembly
Preceded by Clare Willard	New York State Assembly; Cattaraugus County; 1915–1920	Succeeded by Leigh G. Kirkland
New York State Senate
Preceded by J. Samuel Fowler	New York State Senate; 39th District; 1921–1924	Succeeded by Leigh G. Kirkland
