= James H. Underwood =

American farmer & politician (1873–1950)

James Harrington Underwood
- In office 1924–1925
- Preceded by: Franklin S. Sampson
- Succeeded by: Edwin C. Nutt

Personal details
- Born: December 25, 1873 Middlesex, New York, U.S.
- Died: December 8, 1950 (aged 77)

James Harrington Underwood (December 25, 1873 – December 8, 1950) was an American farmer and politician from New York.

== Life ==
Underwood was born on December 25, 1873, in Middlesex, New York, the youngest son of Thomas Underwood and Frances Harrington.

Underwood attended school in Middlesex in Rushville and took a banking course at the Rochester Business Institute, after which he began working on his father's farm in Overackers Corners. He later owned his own farm and vineyard. For many years, he and L. A. Adams were buyers of grapes and produce under the name Adams and Underwood. In around 1940 he became manager of the Middlesex Corporation Association, resigning from the position in September 1950 due to poor health. He was elected town clerk in 1905, an office he held for six years. He also served as clerk for the Yates County Board of Supervisors from 1909 to 1911, was elected town supervisor in 1911 and served that office for several years, and in 1930 was appointed postmaster of Middlesex and served in that office for five years.

Underwood was a messenger for the New York State Assembly in 1908, and was Postmaster of the Assembly in 1910, 1912, 1914, 1915, 1916, 1917, 1918, 1919, 1920, 1921, 1922, and 1923. In 1923, he was elected to the Assembly as a Republican, representing Yates County. He served in the Assembly in 1924 and 1925.

Underwood attended the Middlesex Methodist Church. He helped form the Middlesex Chamber of Commerce, and served as its president from 1925 to 1928. He was a member of the Odd Fellows and the Grange, and served as a director of the Finger Lakes Association. In 1897, he married Minnie Nott of Cheshire. They had a son, Harold T.

Underwood died at home on December 8, 1950. He was buried in the family plot in Overackers Cemetery.

New York State Assembly
Preceded by Franklin S. Sampson	New York State Assembly; Yates County; 1924–1925	Succeeded by Edwin C. Nutt
