= George A. Slater =

American lawyer and politician

George Atwood Slater (September 2, 1867 – February 23, 1937) was an American lawyer and politician from New York.

== Early life ==
He was born in Greenwich, Connecticut, to Atwood Slater and Julia E. (Scott) Slater. He attended the public schools and Greenwich Academy. Then he studied law, was admitted to the bar in Connecticut in 1888, but enrolled in Columbia Law School the same year. He was admitted to the bar in New York in 1889, and practised in New York City. He finished his law course at Columbia in 1890, but was among 33 alumni of the class of 1890 who received their LL.B. degrees only in 1934.

== Public service ==
On June 2, 1891, Slater married Eva Elizabeth Sours (died 1950), and continued the practice of law in Port Chester, his wife's hometown. He was Counsel of the Town of Rye from 1900 to 1906, and a Trustee of the Village of Port Chester from 1902 to 1908.

He was a member of the New York State Assembly (Westchester Co., 4th D.) in 1912. In the Assembly, he was first to make a speech advocating suffrage for women.

He was a member of the New York State Senate (24th D.) from 1915 to 1918, sitting in the 138th, 139th, 140th and 141st New York State Legislatures.

In November 1918, he was elected Surrogate of Westchester County, and was re-elected in 1924, 1930 and 1936; remaining in office from 1919 until his death in 1937.

Slater died on February 23, 1937, in Moore County Hospital in Pinehurst, North Carolina, of appendicitis; and was buried in Rye, New York. Democrat William J. Sheils, whom he had defeated at the election in November 1936, was appointed by Gov. Herbert H. Lehman to fill the vacancy until the end of the year.

== Sources ==
- WESTCHESTER REPUBLICAN in NYT on November 6, 1918
- HOME OF SURROGATE LISTED FOR TAX SALE in NYT on June 22, 1933 (subscription required)
- GEORGE. A. SLATER, SURROGATE, DEAD in NYT on February 24, 1937 (subscription required)
- SHEILS IS NAMED FOR SLATER'S POST in NYT on February 28, 1937 (subscription required)
- MRS. GEORGE A. SLATER in NYT on February 9, 1950 (subscription required)

New York State Assembly
Preceded by John A. Goodwin	New York State Assembly; Richmond County; 1912	Succeeded by Mortimer Charles O'Brien
New York State Senate
Preceded by John F. Healy	New York State Senate; 24th District; 1915–1918	Succeeded by John A. Lynch
