= Alfred J. Gilchrist =

American politician (1872–1931)

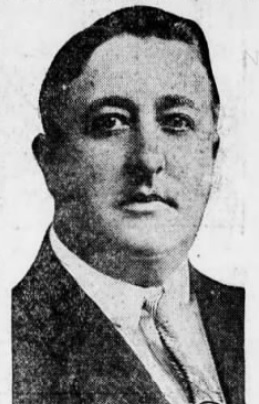
Gilchrist in 1916

Alfred John Gilchrist (August 1872 – June 9, 1931) was an American lawyer and politician from New York.

== Life ==
He was born in August 1872 in New York City, the son of James Gilchrist and Emily Susannah (née Mills, widowed Kay) Gilchrist (1835–1904). He attended New York Law School, was admitted to the bar in 1894, and practiced in Brooklyn. He married Sadie A. Mills (1873–1948), and they had a daughter Emily (Gilchrist) Boillotat (1897–1967).

Gilchrist was a member of the New York State Senate, representing the 10th district in 1907 and 1908.

He was again a member of the State Senate (10th D.) from 1915 to 1918, sitting in the 138th, 139th, 140th and 141st New York State Legislatures. In 1918, he did not seek re-nomination, and ran unsuccessfully for Kings County Judge instead.

He died on June 9, 1931, at his home at 87–38 108th Street in Richmond Hill, Queens, of a goiter ailment.

== Sources ==
- Official New York from Cleveland to Hughes by Charles Elliott Fitch (Hurd Publishing Co., New York and Buffalo, 1911, Vol. IV; pg. 366)
- MANY CHANGES DUE IN STATE SENATE in NYT on August 5, 1918
- SERVICE TOMORROW FOR A. J. GILCHRIST in the New York Evening Post on June 10, 1931
- A. J. GILCHRIST DIES; EX-STATE SENATOR in NYT on June 10, 1931 (subscription required)
- Gilchrist genealogy at Family Tree Maker

New York State Senate
Preceded by Daniel J. Riordan	New York State Senate; 10th District; 1907–1908	Succeeded by Charles Alt
Preceded by Herman H. Torborg	New York State Senate; 10th District; 1915–1918	Succeeded by Jeremiah F. Twomey
