= James A. Foley =

Politician and lawyer from New York, USA

James Aloysius Foley
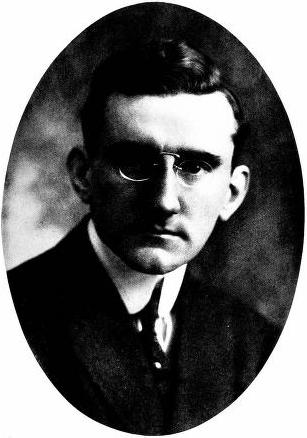
- James A. Foley (1916)

Surrogate of New York County
- In office 1920–1946
- Preceded by: John P. Cohalan

Member of the New York State Senate
- In office 1913–1918
- Preceded by: Thomas F. Grady
- Succeeded by: Bernard Downing
- Constituency: 14th District
- In office 1919–1919
- Preceded by: Robert F. Wagner
- Succeeded by: Joseph D. Kelly
- Constituency: 16th District

Member of the New York State Assembly
- In office 1907–1912
- Preceded by: Max Eckmann
- Succeeded by: Joseph D. Kelly
- Constituency: 12th District

Personal details
- Born: June 21, 1882 New York City, New York, U.S.
- Died: February 11, 1946 (aged 63) Manhattan, New York, U.S.
- Resting place: Calvary Cemetery, Queens, New York, U.S.
- Party: Democratic
- Spouse: Mabel Graham Murphy
- Relations: Charles Francis Murphy (father-in-law)
- Education: College of the City of New York, New York Law School
- Occupation: Politician, lawyer

James Aloysius Foley (June 21, 1882 – February 11, 1946) was an American lawyer and politician from New York.

== Early life and education ==
Foley was born on June 21, 1882, in New York City, the son of James Foley (1846–1919) and Anne Moran Foley (1847–1928). He graduated from the College of the City of New York in 1901 and from New York Law School in 1904.

== Political career ==
Foley was a member of the New York State Assembly representing New York County's 12th District from 1907 to 1912, serving in the 1907, 1908, 1909, 1910, 1911, and 1912. He was chairman of the Committee on Affairs of Cities in 1911.

In 1913, Foley was elected to the New York State Senate, where he served until 1919. He represented the 14th District in the 136th, 137th, 138th, 139th, 140th, and 141st sessions, and the 16th District in the 142nd session. He served as Minority Leader in 1919.

Foley was also a member of the New York State Commission for the Panama–Pacific International Exposition in 1915.

== Later career and personal life ==
On June 21, 1919, Foley married Mabel Graham Murphy, the step-daughter of Tammany Boss Charles Francis Murphy. They had no children.

Foley served as surrogate of New York County from 1920 until his death. In 1924, following the death of his father-in-law, Foley was offered the leadership of Tammany Hall, but he declined, preferring to continue his judicial work.

== Death ==
Foley died on February 11, 1946, in the Harkness Pavilion of the Columbia-Presbyterian Medical Center in Manhattan following a heart attack. He was buried at Calvary Cemetery in Queens.

== Sources ==
- Official New York from Cleveland to Hughes by Charles Elliott Fitch (Hurd Publishing Co., New York and Buffalo, 1911, Vol. IV; pg. 354f, 357 and 359f)
- State of New York at the Panama–Pacific International Exposition, San Francisco, California, 1915 (Albany, 1916; pg. 27)
- MISS MABEL MURPHY WEDS SENATOR FOLEY in NYT on June 22, 1919
- FOR SURROGATE: JAMES A. FOLEY in NYT on November 3, 1919
- SURROGATE FOLEY DIES AT AGE OF 63 in NYT on February 12, 1946 (subscription required)

New York State Assembly
Preceded by Max Eckmann	New York State Assembly; New York County, 12th District; 1907–1912	Succeeded by Joseph D. Kelly
New York State Senate
Preceded by Thomas F. Grady	New York State Senate; 14th District; 1913–1918	Succeeded by Bernard Downing
Preceded by Robert F. Wagner	New York State Senate; 16th District; 1919	Succeeded by Joseph D. Kelly
