= Charles D. Donohue =

American lawyer and politician

Charles Deering Donohue (October 11, 1880 in New York City – March 5, 1928 in Manhattan, New York City) was an American lawyer and Democratic politician from New York.

== Life ==
Donohue was a member of the New York State Assembly from 1913 to 1923; and was Minority Leader from 1918 to 1923.

He was a justice of the New York Supreme Court from 1924 until his death in 1928.

He died on March 5, 1928, at his home at 322 Central Park West in Manhattan, from acute indigestion; and was buried at the Calvary Cemetery in Woodside, Queens.

== Sources ==
- JUSTICE DONOHUE DIES SUDDENLY in NYT on March 6, 1928 (subscription required)
- MEMORIAL OF JUSTICE CHARLES D. DONOHUE by James A. Foley, in Yearbook of the New York County Lawyers' Association

New York State Assembly
Preceded by John C. Hackett	New York State Assembly; New York County, 9th District; 1913–1917	Succeeded by Martin Bourke
Preceded by Maurice McDonald	New York State Assembly; New York County, 5th District; 1918–1923	Succeeded by Frank A. Carlin
Preceded by Joseph M. Callahan	Minority Leader in the New York State Assembly; 1918–1923	Succeeded by Maurice Bloch
