= 145th New York State Legislature =

New York state legislative session

←	144th	146th	→
- New York State Capitol (2009)

Overview
- Legislative body: New York State Legislature
- Jurisdiction: New York, United States
- Term: January 1 – December 31, 1922

Senate
- Members: 51
- President: Lt. Gov. Jeremiah Wood (R)
- Temporary President: Clayton R. Lusk (R)
- Party control: Republican (39–11–1)

Assembly
- Members: 150
- Speaker: H. Edmund Machold (R)
- Party control: Republican (96–53–1)

Sessions
- 1st: January 4 – March 17, 1922
- 2nd: August 28 – 29, 1922

The 145th New York State Legislature, consisting of the New York State Senate and the New York State Assembly, met from January 4 to August 29, 1922, during the second year of Nathan L. Miller's governorship, in Albany.

== Background ==
Under the provisions of the New York Constitution of 1894, re-apportioned in 1917, 51 Senators and 150 assemblymen were elected in single-seat districts; senators for a two-year term, assemblymen for a one-year term. The senatorial districts consisted either of one or more entire counties; or a contiguous area within a single county. The counties which were divided into more than one senatorial district were New York (nine districts), Kings (eight), Bronx (three), Erie (three), Monroe (two), Queens (two) and Westchester (two). The Assembly districts were made up of contiguous area, all within the same county.

At this time there were two major political parties: the Republican Party and the Democratic Party. The Socialist Party also nominated tickets.

== Elections ==
The 1921 New York state election, was held on November 8. The only statewide elective office up for election was a judgeship on the New York Court of Appeals which was carried by Republican William Shankland Andrews. The approximate party strength at this election, as expressed by the vote for Judge of the Court of Appeals, was: Republicans 1,146,000; Democrats 1,081,000; and Socialists 146,000.

The only assemblywoman of 1921, Marguerite L. Smith (Rep.), an athletics teacher, of Harlem, was defeated for re-election, and no women were elected to the Legislature of 1922.

== Sessions ==
The Legislature met for the regular session at the State Capitol in Albany on January 4, 1922; and adjourned on March 17.

H. Edmund Machold (Rep.) was re-elected Speaker.

The Legislature met for a special session at the State Capitol in Albany on August 28 and 29, 1922. This session was called to deal with the shortage of coal. The Legislature created the office of State Fuel Administrator, and William H. Woodin was appointed by Governor Miller to the post. Woodin resigned on January 8, 1923, and Governor Al Smith appointed George W. Goethals to succeed. The post was abolished by Smith, effective on April 1, 1923.

== State Senate ==
=== Districts ===
- 1st District: Nassau and Suffolk counties
- 2nd and 3rd District: Parts of Queens County, i.e. the Borough of Queens
- 4th, 5th, 6th, 7th, 8th, 9th, 10th and 11th District: Parts of Kings County, i.e. the Borough of Brooklyn
- 12th, 13th, 14th, 15th, 16th, 17th, 18th, 19th and 20th District: Parts of New York County, i.e. the Borough of Manhattan
- 21st, 22nd and 23rd District: Parts of Bronx County, i.e. the Borough of the Bronx
- 24th District: Richmond County, i.e. the Borough of Richmond (now the Borough of Staten Island), and Rockland County
- 25th District: Part of Westchester County
- 26th District: Cortlandt, Greenburgh, Mount Pleasant, Ossining and part of Yonkers; in Westchester County
- 27th District: Orange and Sullivan counties
- 28th District: Columbia, Dutchess and Putnam counties
- 29th District: Delaware, Greene and Ulster counties
- 30th District: Albany County
- 31st District: Rensselaer County
- 32nd District: Saratoga and Schenectady counties
- 33rd District: Clinton, Essex, Warren and Washington counties
- 34th District: Franklin and St. Lawrence counties
- 35th District: Fulton, Hamilton, Herkimer and Lewis counties
- 36th District: Oneida County
- 37th District: Jefferson and Oswego counties
- 38th District: Onondaga County
- 39th District: Madison, Montgomery, Otsego and Schoharie counties
- 40th District: Broome, Chenango and Cortland counties
- 41st District: Chemung, Schuyler, Tioga and Tompkins counties
- 42nd District: Cayuga, Seneca and Wayne counties
- 43rd District: Ontario, Steuben and Yates counties
- 44th District: Allegany, Genesee, Livingston and Wyoming
- 45th and 46th District: Monroe County
- 47th District: Niagara and Orleans counties
- 48th, 49th and 50th District: Erie County
- 51st District: Cattaraugus and Chautauqua counties

=== Members ===
The asterisk (*) denotes members of the previous Legislature who continued in office as members of this Legislature.

Note: For brevity, the chairmanships omit the words "...the Committee on (the)..."

District	Senator	Party	Notes
1st	George L. Thompson*	Republican	
2nd	John L. Karle*	Republican	
3rd	Peter J. McGarry*	Democrat	
4th	Maxwell S. Harris*	Republican	
5th	Daniel F. Farrell*	Democrat	
6th	William T. Simpson*	Republican	
7th	Charles C. Lockwood*	Republican	
8th	Alvah W. Burlingame Jr.*	Republican	
9th	George M. Reischmann*	Republican	died on February 7, 1922
10th	Jeremiah F. Twomey*	Democrat	
11th	Abraham L. Katlin*	Republican	
12th	Jimmy Walker*	Democrat	Minority Leader
13th	John J. Boylan*	Democrat	on November 7, 1922, elected to the 68th U.S. Congress
14th	Bernard Downing*	Democrat	
15th	Nathan Straus Jr.*	Democrat	
16th	Thomas I. Sheridan	Democrat	elected to fill vacancy, in place of Martin G. McCue
17th	Schuyler M. Meyer*	Republican	
18th	Salvatore A. Cotillo*	Democrat	
19th	William Duggan*	Republican	
20th	Ward V. Tolbert*	Republican	
21st	Henry G. Schackno*	Democrat	
22nd	Edmund Seidel*	Socialist	
23rd	John J. Dunnigan*	Democrat	
24th	C. Ernest Smith*	Republican	
25th	George T. Burling*	Republican	
26th	Holland S. Duell*	Republican	
27th	Caleb H. Baumes*	Republican	
28th	James E. Towner*	Republican	
29th	Charles W. Walton*	Republican	
30th	Frank L. Wiswall*	Republican	
31st	Frederick E. Draper*	Republican	
32nd	Frederick W. Kavanaugh*	Republican	
33rd	Mortimer Y. Ferris*	Republican	
34th	Warren T. Thayer*	Republican	
35th	Theodore Douglas Robinson*	Republican	
36th	Frederick M. Davenport*	Republican	
37th	Fred B. Pitcher*	Republican	
38th	George R. Fearon*	Republican	
39th	Allen J. Bloomfield*	Republican	
40th	Clayton R. Lusk*	Republican	Temporary President
41st	Seymour Lowman*	Republican	
42nd	Charles J. Hewitt*	Republican	
43rd	William A. Carson*	Republican	
44th	John Knight*	Republican	
45th	James L. Whitley*	Republican	
46th	Homer E. A. Dick	Rep./Proh.	elected to fill vacancy, in place of John B. Mullan
47th	William W. Campbell*	Republican	
48th	Parton Swift*	Republican	
49th	William E. Martin*	Republican	
50th	Leonard W. H. Gibbs*	Republican	
51st	DeHart H. Ames*	Republican	

=== Employees ===
- Clerk: Ernest A. Fay
- Sergeant-at-Arms:
- Assistant Sergeant-at-Arms:
- Principal Doorkeeper:
- First Assistant Doorkeeper:
- Stenographer:

== State Assembly ==
=== Assemblymen ===
Note: For brevity, the chairmanships omit the words "...the Committee on (the)..."

District		Assemblymen	Party	Notes
Albany	1st	Edgar C. Campbell*	Republican	
Albany	2nd	John T. Merrigan*	Democrat	
Albany	3rd	James M. Gaffers*	Republican	Chairman of Public Institutions
Allegany		William Duke Jr.*	Republican	Chairman of Codes
Bronx	1st	Nicholas J. Eberhard	Democrat	
Bronx	2nd	Lester W. Patterson	Democrat	
Bronx	3rd	Benjamin Antin*	Democrat	
Bronx	4th	Louis A. Schoffel	Dem./Rep.	
Bronx	5th	William Lyman*	Dem./Rep.	
Bronx	6th	Thomas J. McDonald*	Democrat	
Bronx	7th	Joseph V. McKee*	Democrat	
Bronx	8th	Edward J. Walsh*	Democrat	
Broome	1st	Edmund B. Jenks*	Republican	
Broome	2nd	Forman E. Whitcomb*	Republican	Chairman of Soldiers' Home
Cattaraugus		Leigh G. Kirkland*	Republican	
Cayuga		L. Ford Hager*	Republican	Chairman of Internal Affairs
Chautauqua	1st	Judson S. Wright*	Republican	
Chautauqua	2nd	Joseph A. McGinnies*	Republican	Chairman of Ways and Means
Chemung		John J. Richford*	Republican	Chairman of General Laws
Chenango		Charles L. Banks	Republican	
Clinton		Charles M. Harrington*	Republican	
Columbia		Roscoe C. Waterbury	Republican	
Cortland		Irving F. Rice*	Republican	Chairman of Revision
Delaware		Lincoln R. Long*	Republican	Chairman of Excise
Dutchess	1st	J. Griswold Webb*	Republican	Chairman of Charitable and Religious Societies
Dutchess	2nd	John M. Hackett	Republican	
Erie	1st	William J. Hickey	Republican	
Erie	2nd	John W. Slacer*	Republican	
Erie	3rd	August Seelbach*	Republican	
Erie	4th	Andrew T. Beasley*	Democrat	
Erie	5th	Alexander A. Patrzykowski	Dem./Rep./Proh.	
Erie	6th	George H. Rowe*	Republican	Chairman of Judiciary
Erie	7th	Herbert A. Zimmerman*	Republican	Chairman of Canals
Erie	8th	Nelson W. Cheney*	Republican	Chairman of Banks
Essex		Fred L. Porter*	Republican	
Franklin		Anson H. Ellsworth*	Republican	
Fulton and Hamilton		Eberly Hutchinson*	Republican	Chairman of Insurance
Genesee		Charles P. Miller*	Republican	Chairman of Labor and Industries
Greene		George W. Osborn	Republican	
Herkimer		Frederic S. Cole	Republican	
Jefferson		H. Edmund Machold*	Republican	re-elected Speaker; Chairman of Rules
Kings	1st	Francis J. Cronin	Democrat	
Kings	2nd	Edmund H. Alexander	Republican	
Kings	3rd	Frank J. Taylor*	Democrat	
Kings	4th	Peter A. McArdle*	Democrat	
Kings	5th	James H. Caulfield Jr.*	Republican	Chairman of Commerce and Navigation
Kings	6th	John R. Crews*	Republican	
Kings	7th	John J. Howard	Democrat	
Kings	8th	Michael J. Reilly*	Democrat	
Kings	9th	Richard J. Tonry	Democrat	
Kings	10th	Bernard F. Gray	Democrat	
Kings	11th	James F. Bly*	Republican	Chairman of Social Welfare
Kings	12th	Marcellus H. Evans	Democrat	
Kings	13th	John J. Wackerman*	Democrat	
Kings	14th	Andrew B. Yacenda	Democrat	
Kings	15th	John J. McLoughlin*	Democrat	
Kings	16th	Philip M. Kleinfeld	Democrat	
Kings	17th	Frederick A. Wells*	Republican	Chairman of Military Affairs
Kings	18th	Irwin Steingut	Democrat	
Kings	19th	Charles L. Fasullo	Democrat	
Kings	20th	Frank A. Miller	Democrat	
Kings	21st	Walter F. Clayton*	Republican	
Kings	22nd	Howard C. Franklin	Democrat	
Kings	23rd	Joseph F. Ricca	Rep./Dem.	
Lewis		Miller B. Moran*	Republican	
Livingston		Lewis G. Stapley	Republican	
Madison		J. Arthur Brooks*	Republican	
Monroe	1st	James A. Harris*	Republican	Chairman of Public Education
Monroe	2nd	Simon L. Adler*	Republican	Majority Leader
Monroe	3rd	Vincent B. Murphy	Republican	
Monroe	4th	Gilbert L. Lewis*	Republican	
Monroe	5th	Franklin W. Judson*	Republican	Chairman of Taxation and Retrenchment
Montgomery		Samuel W. McCleary*	Republican	
Nassau	1st	Thomas A. McWhinney*	Republican	Chairman of Affairs of Villages
Nassau	2nd	F. Trubee Davison	Republican	
New York	1st	Peter J. Hamill*	Democrat	
New York	2nd	Frank R. Galgano*	Democrat	
New York	3rd	Thomas F. Burchill*	Democrat	
New York	4th	Samuel Dickstein*	Democrat	on November 7, 1922, elected to the 68th U.S. Congress
New York	5th	Charles D. Donohue*	Democrat	Minority Leader
New York	6th	Sol Ullman*	Republican	
New York	7th	Victor R. Kaufmann	Republican	
New York	8th	Henry O. Kahan	Democrat	
New York	9th	Edward R. Rayher*	Republican	
New York	10th	Bernard Aronson*	Republican	
New York	11th	Samuel I. Rosenman	Democrat	
New York	12th	John J. O'Connor*	Democrat	
New York	13th	John P. Nugent	Democrat	
New York	14th	Frederick L. Hackenburg*	Democrat	
New York	15th	Joseph Steinberg*	Republican	Chairman of Claims
New York	16th	Maurice Bloch*	Democrat	
New York	17th	Murray Felenstein	Democrat	contested; seat vacated on February 27
New York	17th	August Claessens	Socialist	seated on February 28
New York	18th	Owen M. Kiernan*	Democrat	
New York	19th	James Male	Democrat	
New York	20th	Louis A. Cuvillier	Democrat	
New York	21st	Horace W. Palmer	Republican	
New York	22nd	Michael E. Reiburn*	Democrat	
New York	23rd	George N. Jesse*	Republican	
Niagara	1st	David E. Jeffery*	Republican	
Niagara	2nd	Frank S. Hall	Republican	
Oneida	1st	Hartwell W. Booth*	Republican	
Oneida	2nd	Russell G. Dunmore	Republican	
Oneida	3rd	Chauncey J. Williams*	Republican	
Onondaga	1st	Manuel J. Soule*	Republican	Chairman of Penal Institutions
Onondaga	2nd	Gardner J. Chamberlin*	Republican	
Onondaga	3rd	Thomas K. Smith*	Republican	
Ontario		Charles C. Sackett*	Republican	
Orange	1st	Arthur E. Brundage*	Republican	
Orange	2nd	George R. Farrell	Republican	
Orleans		Frank H. Lattin*	Republican	Chairman of Public Health
Oswego		Ezra A. Barnes*	Republican	
Otsego		Julian C. Smith*	Republican	
Putnam		John R. Yale*	Republican	Chairman of Railroads
Queens	1st	Peter A. Leininger*	Democrat	
Queens	2nd	Owen J. Dever	Democrat	
Queens	3rd	Joseph V. Loscalzo	Democrat	
Queens	4th	Joseph H. S. Thomas	Democrat	
Queens	5th	William F. Brunner	Democrat	
Queens	6th	Joseph E. Cosgrove	Democrat	
Rensselaer	1st	John F. Rourke	Democrat	
Rensselaer	2nd	Arthur Cowee*	Republican	
Richmond	1st	Thomas F. Cosgrove*	Democrat	
Richmond	2nd	William L. Vaughan	Democrat	
Rockland		Pierre H. DePew	Republican	
St. Lawrence	1st	William A. Laidlaw	Republican	
St. Lawrence	2nd	Edward A. Everett*	Republican	Chairman of Conservation
Saratoga		Burton D. Esmond	Republican	
Schenectady	1st	Charles T. Male	Republican	
Schenectady	2nd	William W. Campbell*	Republican	
Schoharie		Wallace H. Sidney	Democrat	
Schuyler		Clarence W. Hausner*	Republican	
Seneca		George A. Dobson*	Republican	
Steuben	1st	Ernest E. Cole*	Republican	Chairman of Printed and Engrossed Bills
Steuben	2nd	Leon F. Wheatley	Republican	
Suffolk	1st	John G. Peck	Republican	
Suffolk	2nd	Paul N. Westerbeke	Republican	
Sullivan		Guernsey T. Cross	Democrat	
Tioga		Daniel P. Witter*	Republican	Chairman of Agriculture
Tompkins		Casper Fenner*	Republican	Chairman of Electricity, Gas and Water Supply
Ulster		Simon B. Van Wagenen*	Republican	
Warren		Milton N. Eldridge	Republican	
Washington		Herbert A. Bartholomew*	Republican	
Wayne		Charles H. Betts*	Republican	Chairman of Public Printing
Westchester	1st	Thomas Channing Moore*	Republican	
Westchester	2nd	Walter W. Westall*	Republican	
Westchester	3rd	Seabury C. Mastick*	Republican	
Westchester	4th	Russell B. Livermore	Republican	
Westchester	5th	George Blakely*	Republican	Chairman of Affairs of Cities
Wyoming		Webb A. Joiner	Republican	
Yates		James M. Lown*	Republican	

=== Employees ===
- Clerk: Fred W. Hammond
- Postmaster: James H. Underwood

== Sources ==
- CITIZENS UNION GIVES LINE ON CANDIDATES in NYT on October 26, 1921
- Journal of the Assembly (145th Session) (1922; Vol. II; from March 1 to 14)
- ASSEMBLY COMMITTEES in The Troy Times, of Troy, on January 10, 1922
- Members of the New York Assembly (1920s) at Political Graveyard
