= William Wickham =

William Wickham may refer to:

- William Wickham (bishop) (1539–1595), English bishop
- William Wickham (civil servant) (1761–1840), British civil servant and politician; spymaster during the French Revolution
- William Wickham (cricketer) (1825–1845), English cricketer
- William Wickham (Conservative politician) (1831–1897), Member of Parliament for Petersfield, 1892–1897; grandson of William Wickham (1761–1840)
- William Wickham (New York politician) (1871–1959), American farmer, businessman, member of the New York State Assembly
- William Wickham (1782–1860), social reformer and campaigner for the Parliamentary Reform Act 1832
- William H. Wickham (1832–1893), New York mayor

== See also ==
- William of Wykeham (1320–1404), Bishop of Winchester and Lord Chancellor
- Williams Carter Wickham (1820–1888), American lawyer, judge, politician, and Confederate cavalry general
