= George R. Fearon =

American politician

George Randolph Fearon (March 12, 1883 – January 2, 1976) was an American lawyer and politician from New York. He was President pro tempore of the New York State Senate from 1931 to 1932.

== Life ==
Fearon was born in Oneida, New York to George Fearon and Anna Elizabeth (Charlow) Fearon. He graduated from Oneida High School in 1901, then studied law at Syracuse University and was admitted to the bar in 1905. On November 17, 1909, he married Cora Lucy Nichols, and they had two daughters: Elizabeth Mary Fearon and Helen Charlow Fearon.

He was a member of the New York State Assembly (Onondaga Co., 3rd D.) in 1916, 1917, 1918, 1919, 1920.

He was a member of the New York State Senate (38th D.) from 1921 to 1936, sitting in the 144th, 145th, 146th, 147th, 148th, 149th, 150th, 151st, 152nd, 153rd, 154th, 155th, 156th, 157th, 158th and 159th New York State Legislatures; and was Temporary President from 1931 to 1932, and Minority Leader from 1933 to 1936. He was a delegate to the 1932 Republican National Convention.

His first wife Cora died in January 1938 during a stomach operation. On March 4, 1939, he married in Bronxville, New York, Bertha (Stone) Moore who had been a delegate to the New York State Constitutional Convention of 1938, and was the widow of Assemblyman Thomas Channing Moore.

On August 5, 1953, he married Katherine McBride. He died in Naples, Florida.

== Sources ==
- Political Graveyard
- His first wife's obit in NYT on January 13, 1938 (subscription required)
- His engagement, in NYT on August 28, 1938 (subscription required)
- His second marriage, in NYT on March 5, 1939 (subscription required)
- His third marriage, in NYT on August 8, 1953 (subscription required)
- Obit in NYT on January 4, 1976 (giving wrong middle initial "E.") (subscription required)
- Eminent Judges and Lawyers of the American Bar by Charles William Taylor
- Obit of his mother, at RootsWeb
- His entry at RootsWeb (mixing up the last name of his second wife and the first name of his third wife)

New York State Assembly
Preceded by Jacob R. Buecheler	New York State Assembly; Onondaga County, 3rd District; 1916–1920	Succeeded by Thomas K. Smith
New York State Senate
Preceded by J. Henry Walters	New York State Senate; 38th District; 1921–1936	Succeeded by Francis L. McElroy
Political offices
Preceded by John Knight	President pro tempore of the New York State Senate; 1931–1932	Succeeded by John J. Dunnigan
Preceded by John J. Dunnigan	Minority Leader in the New York State Senate; 1933–1936	Succeeded by Perley A. Pitcher
