= John J. Dunnigan =

American politician

John J. Dunnigan (September 6, 1883 – December 1965) was an American architect, builder and politician from New York. He was President pro tempore of the New York State Senate from 1933 to 1938.

== Life ==
He was a Democratic member of the New York State Senate from 1915 to 1920, sitting in the 138th, 139th, 140th, 141st, 142nd and 143rd New York State Legislatures.

In 1919 he introduced a state equal rights amendment for women, who had won the vote in New York two years before. The bill would have amended the state labor law as follows:

“Hereafter in this State every avenue of employment shall be open to women, and any business, vocation, profession and calling followed and pursued by men may be followed and pursued by women, and no person shall be disqualified from engaging in any business, vocation, profession, calling or employment on account of sex. Women doing equal work with men in any occupation, trade or industry in this State shall receive the same compensation therefor as men doing work of the same character. The provisions of this section shall supersede any provision of this chapter or other statute inconsistent herewith.”

The bill did not pass. In 1921, he contested the election of Republican George H. Taylor to the State Senate, and was seated on February 15 in the 144th New York State Legislature. He remained in the State Senate until 1944, sitting in the 145th, 146th, 147th, 148th, 149th, 150th, 151st, 152nd, 153rd, 154th, 155th, 156th, 157th, 158th, 159th, 160th, 161st, 162nd, 163rd and 164th New York State Legislatures; and was Minority Leader from 1931 to 1932, President pro tempore from 1933 to 1938, and again Minority Leader from 1939 to 1944. He was a delegate to the New York Convention to ratify the Twenty-first Amendment to the United States Constitution in 1933.

He co-authored the Parimutuel betting law which legalized betting on horses at the racetracks, and banished the bookmakers from the tracks. It also gave the State a 5% share in the bets. He inaugurated the novelty by buying the first ticket at Jamaica Race Course in April 1940.

His son James J. Dunnigan (1912–1983) was President of the Buffalo Raceway in Hamburg, NY from its establishment in 1942 until the 1960s.

== Sources ==
- Obit in NYT on December 12, 1965 (subscription required)
- The inauguration of the new parimutuel betting, in TIME Magazine on April 29, 1940

New York State Senate
Preceded by John Davidson	New York State Senate; 21st District; 1915–1918	Succeeded by Henry G. Schackno
Preceded by George Cromwell	New York State Senate; 23rd District; 1919–1920	Succeeded by George H. Taylor
Preceded by George H. Taylor	New York State Senate; 23rd District; 1921–1944	Succeeded by Alexander A. Falk
Political offices
Preceded by Bernard Downing	Minority Leader in the New York State Senate; 1931–1932	Succeeded by George R. Fearon
Preceded by George R. Fearon	President pro tempore of the New York State Senate; 1933-1938	Succeeded by Perley A. Pitcher
Preceded by Perley A. Pitcher	Minority Leader in the New York State Senate; 1939–1944	Succeeded by Elmer F. Quinn
