= Sanford G. Lyon =

American businessman and politician

Sanford G. Lyon (March 20, 1866 – January 18, 1936) was an American businessman and politician from New York.

== Life ==
Lyon was born on March 20, 1866, in Ledyard, New York, the son of Hiram Lyon and Abby Gifford. He attended Sherwood Select School in Sherwood.

Lyon entered the hay and grain business in 1885. In 1891, he bought the coal yards and grain elevator in Aurora, where he began conducting the coal, lumber, and grain business and engaged in farming. In 1906, he was elected a director of the First National Bank of Aurora. He was appointed vice-president of the bank in 1908. By time he died, he was president of the bank. He was also elected a director of the Auburn Trust Company at its first meeting in 1906. During World War One, he was a member of the Cayuga County Home Defense Committee and district chairman for the Liberty Loan.

Lyon served as trustee and president of Aurora, and was on the school board for many years. In 1922, he was elected to the New York State Assembly as a Republican, representing Cayuga County. He served in the Assembly in 1923, 1924, 1925, 1926, and 1927. His paternal grandfather Alfred Lyon, maternal grandfather Sanford Gifford, and uncle Coral C. White all previously served in the Assembly.

In 1896, Lyon married Eliza M. Mekell. After she died in 1906, he married Josephine Head of Ithaca. His children were Mrs. Elbert H. Brock, Mrs. Charles L. Cecil, Esther, Sanford Jr., and Malcolm G. He was a Freemason.

Lyon died at home on January 18, 1936. He was buried in Aurora Cemetery.

New York State Assembly
Preceded by L. Ford Hager	New York State Assembly; Cayuga County; 1923-1927	Succeeded by Chauncey D. Van Alstine
