= Victor R. Kaufmann =

American politician

Victor Rossman Kaufmann (March 14, 1896 – February 5, 1943) was an American lawyer and politician from New York.

== Life ==
Kaufmann was born on March 14, 1896, in Brooklyn, New York, the son of Edward Kaufmann and Sarah Rossman. His father was County Clerk of Kings County for several years and chairman of the Municipal Tax Commission.

Kaufmann attended DeWitt Clinton High School, Far Rockaway High School, and Cornell Law School, graduating from the latter in 1918. He also graduated from the Naval Academy in Annapolis, Maryland, after a special three months course. During World War I, he served as an ensign in the United States Naval Reserve.

In 1919, Kaufmann was admitted to the bar. He was a member of the law firm Kaufmann & Kaufmann from 1921 to 1927. He then became a member of the law firm Meyer, Bangser & Kaufmann from 1929 to 1933, after which he was a member of the firm Bangser & Kaufmann. He was still a member of the latter law firm when he died, with an office in 10 East 40th Street.

In 1921, Kaufmann was elected to the New York State Assembly as a Republican, representing the New York County 7th District. He served in the Assembly in 1922, 1923, and 1924. While in the Assembly, he sponsored, among other laws, a 1926 bill {Kaufman Act} that forced railroads to electrify their NYC operations by prohibiting the operation of all steam locomotives within city boundaries. He was also chairman of the Assembly's military affairs committee in 1924. He was Deputy Attorney General of New York from 1925 to 1931. He was a member of the New York Republican State Executive Committee in 1928. He began serving as assistant clerk of the Assembly in 1936. He was also secretary of the Republican New York County Committee when Kenneth F. Simpson was its chairman. In the 1942 election, he was chairman of the Dewey Volunteers, a nonpartisan organization that worked to elect New York Governor Thomas E. Dewey.

Kaufmann attended Congregation Rodeph Sholom. He was a member of the Inwood Country Club, American Bar Association, the New York County Lawyers' Association, Zeta Beta Tau, the Metropolitan Museum of Art, the New York Athletic Club, and the American Legion. In 1921, he married Anna Nebenzahl. They had a daughter, Shirley Ann.

Kaufmann died in Mount Sinai Hospital, where he was operated on for a stomach ailment, on February 5, 1943.

New York State Assembly
Preceded by Noel B. Fox	New York State Assembly; New York County, 7th District; 1922–1924	Succeeded by John L. Buckley
