= 146th New York State Legislature =

New York state legislative session

←	145th	147th	→
- New York State Capitol (2009)

Overview
- Legislative body: New York State Legislature
- Jurisdiction: New York, United States
- Term: January 1 – December 31, 1923

Senate
- Members: 51
- President: Lt. Gov. George R. Lunn (D)
- Temporary President: Jimmy Walker (D)
- Party control: Democratic (26–25)

Assembly
- Members: 150
- Speaker: H. Edmund Machold (R)
- Party control: Republican (81–69)

Sessions
- 1st: January 3 – May 4, 1923

The 146th New York State Legislature, consisting of the New York State Senate and the New York State Assembly, met from January 3 to May 4, 1923, during the first year of Al Smith's second tenure as Governor of New York, in Albany.

== Background ==
Under the provisions of the New York Constitution of 1894, re-apportioned in 1917, 51 Senators and 150 assemblymen were elected in single-seat districts; senators for a two-year term, assemblymen for a one-year term. The senatorial districts consisted of either one or more entire counties; or a contiguous area within a single county. The counties which were divided into more than one senatorial district were New York (nine districts), Kings (eight), Bronx (three), Erie (three), Monroe (two), Queens (two) and Westchester (two). The Assembly districts were made up of contiguous area, all within the same county.

At this time there were two major political parties: the Republican Party and the Democratic Party. The Socialist Party nominated a fusion ticket with the Farmer–Labor Party. The Prohibition Party and the Socialist Labor Party also nominated tickets.

== Elections ==
The 1922 New York state election, was held on November 7. Ex-Governor Al Smith (Dem.) unseated the incumbent Governor Nathan L. Miller (Rep.); and Mayor of Schenectady George R. Lunn (Dem.) was elected lieutenant governor. The other six statewide elective offices up for election were also carried by the Democrats. The approximate party strength at this election, as expressed by the vote for Governor, was: Democrats 1,398,000; Republicans 1,012,000; Socialists/Farmer-Labor 108,000; Prohibition 10,000; and Socialist Labor 4,000.

No women were elected to the legislature.

== Sessions ==
The legislature met for the regular session at the State Capitol in Albany on January 3, 1923; and adjourned on May 4.

H. Edmund Machold (Rep.) was re-elected Speaker.

Jimmy Walker (Dem.) was elected Temporary President of the State Senate.

== State Senate ==
=== Districts ===
- 1st District: Nassau and Suffolk counties
- 2nd and 3rd District: Parts of Queens County, i.e. the Borough of Queens
- 4th, 5th, 6th, 7th, 8th, 9th, 10th and 11th District: Parts of Kings County, i.e. the Borough of Brooklyn
- 12th, 13th, 14th, 15th, 16th, 17th, 18th, 19th and 20th District: Parts of New York County, i.e. the Borough of Manhattan
- 21st, 22nd and 23rd District: Parts of Bronx County, i.e. the Borough of the Bronx
- 24th District: Richmond County, i.e. the Borough of Richmond (now the Borough of Staten Island), and Rockland County
- 25th District: Part of Westchester County
- 26th District: Cortlandt, Greenburgh, Mount Pleasant, Ossining and part of Yonkers; in Westchester County
- 27th District: Orange and Sullivan counties
- 28th District: Columbia, Dutchess and Putnam counties
- 29th District: Delaware, Greene and Ulster counties
- 30th District: Albany County
- 31st District: Rensselaer County
- 32nd District: Saratoga and Schenectady counties
- 33rd District: Clinton, Essex, Warren and Washington counties
- 34th District: Franklin and St. Lawrence counties
- 35th District: Fulton, Hamilton, Herkimer and Lewis counties
- 36th District: Oneida County
- 37th District: Jefferson and Oswego counties
- 38th District: Onondaga County
- 39th District: Madison, Montgomery, Otsego and Schoharie counties
- 40th District: Broome, Chenango and Cortland counties
- 41st District: Chemung, Schuyler, Tioga and Tompkins counties
- 42nd District: Cayuga, Seneca and Wayne counties
- 43rd District: Ontario, Steuben and Yates counties
- 44th District: Allegany, Genesee, Livingston and Wyoming
- 45th and 46th District: Monroe County
- 47th District: Niagara and Orleans counties
- 48th, 49th and 50th District: Erie County
- 51st District: Cattaraugus and Chautauqua counties

=== Members ===
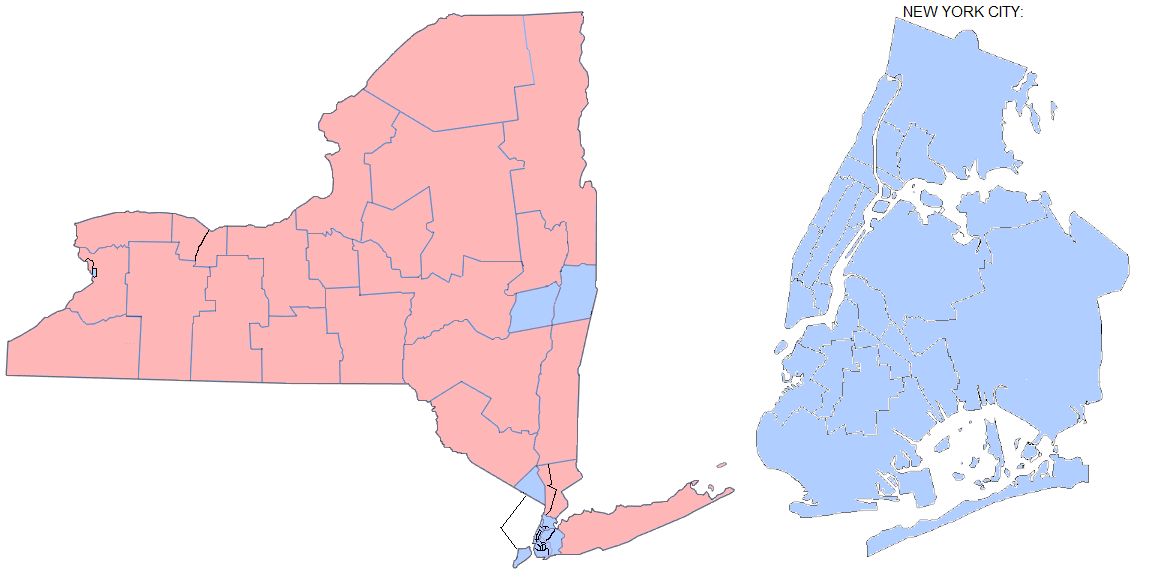
Partisan composition of the Senate.

The asterisk (*) denotes members of the previous Legislature who continued in office as members of this Legislature. Philip M. Kleinfeld, Michael E. Reiburn, Benjamin Antin, Walter W. Westall, Seabury C. Mastick, J. Griswold Webb and Ernest E. Cole changed from the Assembly to the Senate.

Note: For brevity, the chairmanships omit the words "...the Committee on (the)..."

District	Senator	Party	Notes
1st	George L. Thompson*	Republican	re-elected
2nd	Frank Giorgio	Democrat	Chairman of Public Printing
3rd	Peter J. McGarry*	Democrat	re-elected; Chairman of Internal Affairs
4th	Philip M. Kleinfeld*	Democrat	Chairman of Revision
5th	Daniel F. Farrell*	Democrat	re-elected; Chairman of Affairs of Cities
6th	James A. Higgins	Democrat	Chairman of Privileges and Elections
7th	John A. Hastings	Democrat	Chairman of Printed and Engrossed Bills
8th	William L. Love	Democrat	Chairman of Penal Institutions
9th	Charles E. Russell	Democrat	Chairman of Banks
10th	Jeremiah F. Twomey*	Democrat	re-elected; Chairman of Public Service
11th	Daniel J. Carroll	Democrat	Chairman of Public Health
12th	Jimmy Walker*	Democrat	re-elected; elected Temporary President; Chairman of Rules
13th	Ellwood M. Rabenold	Democrat	Chairman of Conservation
14th	Bernard Downing*	Democrat	re-elected; Chairman of Finance
15th	Nathan Straus Jr.*	Democrat	re-elected; Chairman of Agriculture
16th	Thomas I. Sheridan*	Democrat	re-elected; Chairman of Taxation and Retrenchment
17th	Meyer Levy	Democrat	Chairman of General Laws
18th	Salvatore A. Cotillo*	Democrat	re-elected; Chairman of Judiciary; on November 6, 1923, elected to the New York Supreme Court
19th	Duncan T. O'Brien	Democrat	Chairman of Military Affairs
20th	Michael E. Reiburn*	Democrat	Chairman of Labor and Industries
21st	Henry G. Schackno*	Democrat	re-elected; Chairman of Codes
22nd	Benjamin Antin	Democrat	Chairman of Education
23rd	John J. Dunnigan*	Democrat	re-elected; Chairman of Insurance
24th	Mark W. Allen	Democrat	Chairman of Commerce and Navigation
25th	Walter W. Westall*	Republican	
26th	Seabury C. Mastick*	Republican	
27th	Caleb H. Baumes*	Republican	re-elected
28th	J. Griswold Webb*	Republican	
29th	Arthur F. Bouton	Republican	
30th	William T. Byrne	Democrat	Chairman of Civil Service
31st	John P. Ryan	Democrat	Chairman of Affairs of Villages
32nd	Frederick W. Kavanaugh*	Republican	re-elected
33rd	Mortimer Y. Ferris*	Republican	re-elected
34th	Warren T. Thayer*	Republican	re-elected
35th	Theodore Douglas Robinson*	Republican	re-elected
36th	Frederick M. Davenport*	Republican	re-elected
37th	Willard S. Augsbury	Republican	
38th	George R. Fearon*	Republican	re-elected
39th	Allen J. Bloomfield*	Republican	re-elected
40th	Clayton R. Lusk*	Republican	re-elected; Minority Leader
41st	Seymour Lowman*	Republican	re-elected
42nd	Charles J. Hewitt*	Republican	re-elected
43rd	Ernest E. Cole*	Republican	
44th	John Knight*	Republican	re-elected
45th	James L. Whitley*	Republican	re-elected
46th	Homer E. A. Dick*	Republican	re-elected
47th	William W. Campbell*	Republican	re-elected
48th	Parton Swift*	Republican	re-elected
49th	Robert C. Lacey	Democrat	Chairman of Canals
50th	Leonard W. H. Gibbs*	Republican	re-elected
51st	DeHart H. Ames*	Republican	re-elected

=== Employees ===
- Clerk: Dominick F. Mullaney
- Sergeant-at-Arms: Ralph D. Paoli
- Assistant Sergeant-at-Arms:
- Principal Doorkeeper:
- First Assistant Doorkeeper:
- Stenographer: Michael Degnan

== State Assembly ==
=== Assemblymen ===
Note: For brevity, the chairmanships omit the words "...the Committee on (the)..."

District		Assemblymen	Party	Notes
Albany	1st	Edgar C. Campbell*	Republican	
Albany	2nd	John A. Boyle	Democrat	
Albany	3rd	Frank A. Wilson	Democrat	
Allegany		William Duke Jr.*	Republican	
Bronx	1st	Nicholas J. Eberhard*	Democrat	
Bronx	2nd	Lester W. Patterson*	Democrat	
Bronx	3rd	Julius S. Berg	Democrat	
Bronx	4th	Louis A. Schoffel*	Democrat	
Bronx	5th	William Lyman*	Democrat	
Bronx	6th	Thomas J. McDonald*	Democrat	
Bronx	7th	Joseph V. McKee*	Democrat	
Bronx	8th	Edward J. Walsh*	Democrat	
Broome	1st	Edmund B. Jenks*	Republican	
Broome	2nd	Forman E. Whitcomb*	Republican	
Cattaraugus		Leigh G. Kirkland*	Republican	
Cayuga		Sanford G. Lyon	Republican	
Chautauqua	1st	Adolf F. Johnson	Republican	
Chautauqua	2nd	Joseph A. McGinnies*	Republican	
Chemung		Oscar Kahler	Democrat	
Chenango		Charles L. Banks*	Republican	
Clinton		George W. Gilbert	Republican	
Columbia		Robert Reginald Livingston	Democrat	
Cortland		Irving F. Rice*	Republican	
Delaware		Lincoln R. Long*	Republican	
Dutchess	1st	Howard N. Allen	Republican	
Dutchess	2nd	John M. Hackett*	Republican	
Erie	1st	William J. Hickey*	Republican	
Erie	2nd	Henry W. Hutt	Republican	
Erie	3rd	August Seelbach*	Republican	
Erie	4th	John J. Meegan	Democrat	
Erie	5th	John Krysinski	Democrat	
Erie	6th	Charles A. Freiberg	Republican	
Erie	7th	Edmund F. Cooke	Republican	
Erie	8th	Nelson W. Cheney*	Republican	
Essex		Fred L. Porter*	Republican	
Franklin		Anson H. Ellsworth*	Republican	
Fulton and Hamilton		Eberly Hutchinson*	Republican	
Genesee		Charles P. Miller*	Republican	
Greene		Ellis W. Bentley	Republican	
Herkimer		Frederic S. Cole*	Republican	
Jefferson		H. Edmund Machold*	Republican	re-elected Speaker
Kings	1st	Francis J. Cronin*	Democrat	
Kings	2nd	John Lucey	Democrat	
Kings	3rd	Frank J. Taylor*	Democrat	
Kings	4th	Peter A. McArdle*	Democrat	
Kings	5th	John Cashmore	Democrat	
Kings	6th	Joseph Reich	Democrat	
Kings	7th	John J. Howard*	Democrat	
Kings	8th	Michael J. Reilly*	Democrat	
Kings	9th	Richard J. Tonry*	Democrat	
Kings	10th	Bernard F. Gray*	Democrat	
Kings	11th	Edward J. Coughlin	Democrat	
Kings	12th	Marcellus H. Evans*	Democrat	
Kings	13th	William A. Donnelly	Democrat	
Kings	14th	Joseph R. Blake	Democrat	
Kings	15th	Gerald F. Dunne	Democrat	
Kings	16th	James F. Kiernan	Democrat	
Kings	17th	Julius Ruger	Democrat	
Kings	18th	Irwin Steingut*	Democrat	
Kings	19th	Charles L. Fasullo*	Democrat	
Kings	20th	Frank A. Miller*	Democrat	
Kings	21st	Walter F. Clayton*	Republican	
Kings	22nd	Howard C. Franklin*	Democrat	
Kings	23rd	Joseph F. Ricca*	Republican	
Lewis		Miller B. Moran*	Republican	
Livingston		Lewis G. Stapley*	Republican	
Madison		J. Arthur Brooks*	Republican	
Monroe	1st	Russell B. Griffith	Republican	
Monroe	2nd	Simon L. Adler*	Republican	Majority Leader
Monroe	3rd	Vincent B. Murphy*	Republican	
Monroe	4th	Gilbert L. Lewis*	Republican	
Monroe	5th	W. Ray Austin	Republican	
Montgomery		Samuel W. McCleary*	Republican	
Nassau	1st	Thomas A. McWhinney*	Republican	
Nassau	2nd	F. Trubee Davison*	Republican	
New York	1st	Peter J. Hamill*	Democrat	
New York	2nd	Frank R. Galgano*	Democrat	
New York	3rd	Thomas F. Burchill*	Democrat	
New York	4th	Samuel Mandelbaum	Democrat	
New York	5th	Charles D. Donohue*	Democrat	Minority Leader; on November 6, 1923, elected to the New York Supreme Court
New York	6th	Sol Ullman*	Republican	
New York	7th	Victor R. Kaufmann*	Republican	
New York	8th	Henry O. Kahan*	Democrat	
New York	9th	John H. Conroy	Democrat	
New York	10th	Joseph T. Flynn	Democrat	
New York	11th	Samuel I. Rosenman*	Democrat	
New York	12th	John J. O'Connor*	Democrat	on November 6, 1923, elected to the 68th U.S. Congress
New York	13th	John P. Nugent*	Democrat	
New York	14th	Frederick L. Hackenburg*	Democrat	
New York	15th	Joseph Steinberg*	Republican	
New York	16th	Maurice Bloch*	Democrat	
New York	17th	Meyer Alterman	Democrat	
New York	18th	Owen M. Kiernan*	Democrat	
New York	19th	James Male*	Democrat	
New York	20th	Louis A. Cuvillier*	Democrat	
New York	21st	Henri W. Shields	Democrat	
New York	22nd	Joseph A. Gavagan	Democrat	
New York	23rd	George N. Jesse*	Republican	
Niagara	1st	David E. Jeffery*	Republican	
Niagara	2nd	Frank S. Hall*	Republican	
Oneida	1st	Michael J. Kernan	Democrat	
Oneida	2nd	Russell G. Dunmore*	Republican	
Oneida	3rd	Chauncey J. Williams*	Republican	
Onondaga	1st	Horace M. Stone	Republican	
Onondaga	2nd	Gardner J. Chamberlin*	Republican	
Onondaga	3rd	Arthur Benson	Republican	
Ontario		Charles C. Sackett*	Republican	
Orange	1st	Clemence C. Smith	Republican	
Orange	2nd	Charles L. Mead	Republican	
Orleans		Frank H. Lattin*	Republican	
Oswego		Ezra A. Barnes*	Republican	
Otsego		Julian C. Smith*	Republican	
Putnam		John R. Yale*	Republican	
Queens	1st	Peter A. Leininger*	Democrat	
Queens	2nd	Owen J. Dever*	Democrat	
Queens	3rd	Alfred J. Kennedy	Democrat	
Queens	4th	Charles P. Sullivan	Democrat	
Queens	5th	William F. Brunner*	Democrat	
Queens	6th	Paul P. Gallagher	Democrat	
Rensselaer	1st	John F. Rourke*	Democrat	
Rensselaer	2nd	Thomas J. Coleman	Democrat	
Richmond	1st	Thomas F. Cosgrove*	Democrat	
Richmond	2nd	William L. Vaughan*	Democrat	
Rockland		James A. Farley	Democrat	
St. Lawrence	1st	William A. Laidlaw*	Republican	
St. Lawrence	2nd	Walter L. Pratt	Republican	
Saratoga		Burton D. Esmond*	Republican	
Schenectady	1st	Charles T. Male*	Republican	
Schenectady	2nd	William W. Campbell*	Republican	
Schoharie		Kenneth H. Fake	Republican	
Schuyler		John W. Gurnett Jr.	Democrat	
Seneca		George A. Dobson*	Republican	
Steuben	1st	Edwin J. Carpenter	Republican	
Steuben	2nd	Leon F. Wheatley*	Republican	
Suffolk	1st	John G. Peck*	Republican	
Suffolk	2nd	Cecil W. Proctor	Republican	
Sullivan		Guernsey T. Cross*	Democrat	
Tioga		Daniel P. Witter*	Republican	
Tompkins		James R. Robinson	Republican	
Ulster		Simon B. Van Wagenen*	Republican	
Warren		Milton N. Eldridge*	Republican	
Washington		Herbert A. Bartholomew*	Republican	
Wayne		George S. Johnson	Republican	
Westchester	1st	Thomas Channing Moore*	Republican	
Westchester	2nd	Herbert B. Shonk	Republican	
Westchester	3rd	Milan E. Goodrich	Republican	
Westchester	4th	Russell B. Livermore*	Republican	
Westchester	5th	Arthur I. Miller	Democrat	
Wyoming		Webb A. Joiner*	Republican	
Yates		Franklin S. Sampson	Republican	

=== Employees ===
- Clerk: Fred W. Hammond
- Postmaster: James H. Underwood

== Sources ==
- COMMITTEES FOR SENATE NAMED in the Geneva Daily Times, of Geneva, New York, on January 10, 1923
- Members of the New York Assembly (1920s) at Political Graveyard
