= John P. Nugent =

American politician

John P. Nugent (September 21, 1879 – October 2, 1944) was an American labor organizer and politician from New York.

== Life ==
Nugent was born on September 21, 1879, in New York City, New York, at 95 Charles Street.

Nugent attended public and parochial schools. In 1898, he began working for shipbuilders Charles Seabury & Co. in the Bronx. He then worked as a rivet heater in the Todd shipyard in Brooklyn. At one point, he managed the Terrace Hotel in Uptown Manhattan. He was active in the Knights of Labor, and in 1904 he was elected business agent for Local Assembly 1830 of the organization. In 1906, he became general business agent of the Railroad Ironworkers of Greater New York, Local Assembly 11,896, American Federation of Labor. He later became a delegate of the Central Federated Union of the New York Trades.

In 1914, Nugent became the State Deputy Superintendent of Elections. In 1921, he was elected to the New York State Assembly as a Democrat, representing the New York County 13th District. He served in the Assembly in 1922, 1923, 1924, 1925, 1926, 1927, 1928, and 1929. While in the Assembly, he worked for measures to speed trials of men accused of contempt of court for not paying alimony. He also championed the rights of labor and fought for traffic regulations. In 1929, he was named secretary of a commission to investigate almshouses. He toured 48 counties in the state, and the commission lead to the state's old-age pension system.

In 1931, Nugent became deputy clerk of the Municipal Court. He served on the New York City Board of Aldermen from 1931 to 1937. He also served on the New York City Council from its formation in 1938 until his death. In 1941, he came into conflict with the Brooklyn Dodgers management when he proposed a local law to penalize Dodgers president Larry MacPhail for levying a 40-cent service charge on passes.

Nugent was married to Mary Ellen Riege. Their son, John P. Jr., was in the Marines.

Nugent died in Reconstruction Hospital in Manhattan on October 2, 1944. He was buried in Saint Raymond's Cemetery in the Bronx.

New York State Assembly
Preceded by Robert B. Wallace	New York State Assembly; New York County, 13th District; 1922–1929	Succeeded by Joseph H. Broderick
