= Ward V. Tolbert =

American lawyer and politician

Ward Vanderhoof Tolbert (April 28, 1877 – April 11, 1946) was an American lawyer and politician from New York.

== Life ==
Tolbert was born on April 28, 1877, in Weston, New York, the son of Isaac Little Tolbert and Celia Vanderhoof. His father was a farmer and sheriff.

Tolbert spent the first 19 years of his life on his father's farm. He graduated from Cook Academy in Montour Falls in 1897. He taught school in 1898, and in 1899 he was deputy sheriff of Schuyler County. He graduated from the University of Rochester with an A.B. in 1902 and from Columbia Law School with an LL.B. in 1905. He was admitted to the bar in 1904, and after receiving his law degree he joined the law firm Wilder & Anderson in New York City, later known as Wilder, Ewen & Patterson. After Wilder died in 1925, the firm became Tobert, Ewen & Patterson. Tolbert was the senior member of the firm, working with John Ewen and William M. Patterson. He specialized in corporate and tax law, and was retained as counsel by a number of business organizations, including the H. Clay Glover Co., which he was also a director of. He was also president of N. B. Investment Corps. and Delas Investment Corp., vice president and a director of the Frances Investment Corp., and a director of several real estate companies.

In 1920, Tolbert was elected to the New York State Senate as a Republican, representing New York's 20th State Senate district (part of New York County). He served in the Senate in 1921 and 1922. While in the Senate, he introduced a bill for the use of voting machines and sponsored a city home rule act. He resided in Washington Heights at the time. He later moved to Pelham Manor, where he was Pelham Town Republican Chairman and a member of the New York Republican State Committee.

Tolbert was president of the board of trustees of the Huguenot Memorial Church in Pelham Manor. He was a member of the American Bar Association, the New York State Bar Association, the Westchester County Bar Association, the New York City Bar Association, the Freemasons, the Downtown Athletic Club, and the Pelham Country Club. In 1906, he married Edith Laura Williams of Rochester. They had a daughter, Kathryn.

Tolbert died at home on April 11, 1946. He was buried in Woodlawn Cemetery.

New York State Senate
Preceded by William C. Dodge	New York State Senate; 20th District; 1921–1922	Succeeded by Michael E. Reiburn
