= Maxwell S. Harris =

American lawyer and politician from New York (1876–1933)

Member of the New York State Senate from the 4th district
- In office January 1, 1921 – December 31, 1922
- Preceded by: Kenneth F. Sutherland
- Succeeded by: Philip M. Kleinfeld

Personal details
- Born: July 3, 1876 New York City, U.S.
- Died: April 14, 1933 (aged 56) Atlantic City, New Jersey, U.S.
- Cause of death: Heart attack
- Resting place: Acacia Cemetery, New York City, U.S.
- Party: Republican
- Spouse: Helen Westerhouse (m. 1904)
- Children: 1
- Education: City College of New York (AB); New York University (LLB)
- Profession: Politician, lawyer

Maxwell S. Harris (July 3, 1876 – April 14, 1933) was an American lawyer and politician from New York.

== Life ==
Harris was born on July 3, 1876, in New York City. He graduated from the College of the City of New York in 1897 with an A.B. In 1899, he graduated from New York University with an LL.B. He was admitted to the bar shortly afterwards and practiced law at 291 Broadway.

In 1920, Harris was elected to the New York State Senate as a Republican, representing New York's 4th State Senate district. He served in the Senate in 1921 and 1922. After he lost re-election, he opened a new law office at 140 Nassau Street. He remained active in Brooklyn Republican politics, serving as president of the 16th Assembly District Republican Club.

In 1904, Harris married Helen Westerhouse. Their son was William M. He was a member of the American Bar Association, the New York County Lawyers Association, the Brooklyn Bar Association, the Society of Medico-Legal Jurisprudence, the New York Guild for the Jewish Blind, the Brooklyn Lodge of the Elks, and the Menorah Lodge of the Masons. He was also organizer and president of the Borough Park Home Defense League and chairman of the Red Cross in Brooklyn. He served as president of the Borough Park Heights Civic Association, and played a leading role in the movement to build the West End subway line.

Harris died from a heart attack at the Seaside Hotel in Atlantic City, where he was on vacation with his wife, on April 14, 1933. He was buried in Acacia Cemetery in Bayside, Queens.

New York State Senate
Preceded by Kenneth F. Sutherland	New York State Senate; 4th District; 1921-1922	Succeeded by Philip M. Kleinfeld
