= Martin J. Healy =

American politician

Member of the New York State Assembly from the New York County 19th district
- In office 1919
- Preceded by: Edward A. Johnson
- Succeeded by: Marguerite L. Smith

Personal details
- Born: September 16, 1883 New York City, U.S.
- Died: August 30, 1942 (aged 58)
- Resting place: Gate of Heaven Cemetery, Hawthorne, New York, U.S.
- Party: Democratic
- Spouse: Mary C. Klubnik
- Children: 3
- Parent(s): Nicholas J. Healy; Ann M. Healy
- Profession: Politician

Martin J. Healy (September 16, 1883 – August 30, 1942) was an American politician from New York.

== Life ==
Healy was born on September 16, 1883, in New York City, New York, the son of Nicholas J. and Ann M. Healy.

Healy attended the common schools, an evening high school, and a business institute. He worked as a bookkeeper, salesman, and accountant. At one point, he worked for the State Board of Education as a certified public accountant.

In 1918, Healy was elected to the New York State Assembly as a Democrat, representing the New York County 19th District. He defeated the first African-American elected official in New York State, Edward A. Johnson. He served in the Assembly in 1919. He lost the 1919 re-election to Republican Marguerite L. Smith. He ran again in the same district in 1920, and again lost to Smith. While serving in the Assembly, he introduced legislation that provided for the construction of the Triborough Bridge and the payment of a state bonus for veterans of World War I. In 1921 he was elected to the Board of Aldermen as a representative of the Nineteenth District, defeating the first African-American Alderman in the City’s history, Dr. Charles Roberts. He was reelected in 1923. In 1925 he was elected as the Democratic District Leader in the 19th Assembly District, a Tammany Hall position that organizes the political machine in the district and distributes patronage jobs. He also held a patronage position as the New York City Deputy Commissioner of the Department of Plant and Structures. In 1930, he was accused of selling a magistracy to George F. Ewald for $10,000. There were two resulting trials, both of which ended in hung juries, with credible allegations of jury tampering in both cases. The investigation of Healy’s corruption was the impetus to the eventual Seabury investigations into Tammany Hall corruption that brought down Mayor Jimmy Walker. Healy’s corruption scandals led to his resignation as Democratic leader of the 19th Assembly District in 1935, though he attempted reelection in subsequent years.

His political career in Harlem came during a time when the Great Migration led to Harlem transitioning from a majority Irish and Jewish neighborhood to a majority African American neighborhood. He received extensive criticism in black newspapers at the time for his “color line” campaigns, failure to deliver patronage to the African American voters in the community, and his whites-only political club, the Cayuga Democratic Club.

Healy was married to Mary C. Klubnik. Their children were Martin J. Jr., Edward F., and William A. J.

Healy died at home on August 30, 1942. He was buried in Gate of Heaven Cemetery.

New York State Assembly
Preceded by Edward A. Johnson	New York State Assembly; New York County, 19th District; 1919	Succeeded by Marguerite L. Smith
