= Walter F. Clayton =

American politician (1865–1942)

Walter F. Clayton (1865 in Boston, Massachusetts – May 9, 1942, in Greenport, Long Island, New York) was an American architect, builder, and politician from New York.

In his youth, Clayton's parents moved him and his family to Brooklyn, New York. Following his father, Ransom F. Clayton, into the building business, Clayton was very active over a period of 35 years designing and building homes in Brooklyn.

Elected as a Republican in 1921 to represent the 21st Assembly District of Flatbush in the New York State Assembly, Clayton continued as a member of that body for four more years, sitting in the 144th, 145th, 146th, 147th, and 148th New York State Legislatures. Clayton was made the chairman of the Cities Committee in his final year of political office, as well as a member of the Rules Committee.

Clayton was a conservative politician. As the founder of the New York State Motion Picture Censorship Commission, one of the more controversial pieces of legislation that he passed was a motion picture censorship bill in 1923.

Clayton was a respected legislator who, after serving in the Assembly for five years, returned to his building business in 1925.

New York State Assembly
| Preceded by Warren I. Lee | New York State Assembly; Kings County, 21st District; 1921-1925 | Succeeded by Emory F. Dyckman |
