= Thomas J. McDonald =

Reporter and politician

Thomas J. McDonald (June 21, 1883 – June 11, 1931) was an American reporter and politician from New York.

== Life ==
McDonald was born on June 21, 1883, in Mount Vernon, New York. His father, John McDonald, was one of the pioneer settlers of Mount Vernon and fought in the American Civil War.

McDonald worked as a reporter for The Daily Eagle in Mount Vernon. After the paper failed, he began writing for newspapers all over New England. He then returned to New York, settling in Wakefield and worked as advertising manager for the North Side News.

In 1917, McDonald was elected to the New York State Assembly as a Democrat, representing the Bronx County 6th District. He served in the Assembly in 1918, 1919, 1920, 1921, 1922, 1923, 1924, 1925, 1926, and 1927. In 1927, he was elected New York City alderman. He was reelected in 1929.

McDonald was married. He had a son, Thomas J. Jr. He was a member of the Knights of Columbus, the Royal Arcanum, the Loyal Order of Moose, and the Irish Federation.

McDonald died at home of pneumonia on June 11, 1931. He was buried in Woodlawn Cemetery.

New York State Assembly
Preceded by District Created	New York State Assembly; Bronx County, 6th District; 1918-1927	Succeeded by Christopher C. McGrath
