= George N. Jesse =

American politician

George N. Jesse (August 9, 1865 – April 2, 1938) was an American lawyer and politician.

== Life ==
Jesse was born on August 9, 1865 in Owensboro, Kentucky.

Jesse was admitted to the state bar in 1892. Two years later, he became secretary to Representative John D. Clardy in Washington, D.C. He then worked with the Federal Census Bureau from 1897 to 1915. In the latter year, he moved to New York City.

In 1919, Jesse was elected to the New York State Assembly as a Republican, representing the New York County 23rd District. He served in the Assembly in 1920, 1921, 1922, and 1923. While in the Assembly, he fought for housing and rent legislation, which he was an authority on. He was a member of the Lockwood Housing Commission and chairman of the City Affairs Committee. He introduced rent laws in 1920 and a coal bill in 1922. In 1923, he was involved in a political fight in the Legislature over transit affairs, introducing a Republican compromise bill in opposition to the Tammany-supported legislation. He also wrote a bill to speed the prosecution of publishers of obscene literature.He was the 76th and deciding vote for repealing the Mullan-Gage Prohibition enforcement act in New York state. He was the only Republican to vote for repeal, and he lost his next election. He represented Washington Heights.

Jesse was active in the Freemasons. His wife's name was Anna. They had two children, Harold and Mrs. Nina Evans.

Jesse died at his home in Jackson Heights, Queens from heart disease on April 2, 1938. He was buried in Mount Hope Cemetery, Westchester.

New York State Assembly
Preceded by B. Elliot Burston	New York State Assembly; New York County, 23rd District; 1920–1923	Succeeded by Nelson Ruttenberg
