= 147th New York State Legislature =

New York state legislative session

←	146th	148th	→
- New York State Capitol (2009)

Overview
- Legislative body: New York State Legislature
- Jurisdiction: New York, United States
- Term: January 1 – December 31, 1924

Senate
- Members: 51
- President: Lt. Gov. George R. Lunn (D)
- Temporary President: Jimmy Walker (D)
- Party control: Democratic (26–25)

Assembly
- Members: 150
- Speaker: H. Edmund Machold (R)
- Party control: Republican (87–63)

Sessions
- 1st: January 2 – April 11, 1924

The 147th New York State Legislature, consisting of the New York State Senate and the New York State Assembly, met from January 2 to April 11, 1924, during the second year of Al Smith's second tenure as Governor of New York, in Albany.

== Background ==
Under the provisions of the New York Constitution of 1894, re-apportioned in 1917, 51 Senators and 150 assemblymen were elected in single-seat districts; senators for a two-year term, assemblymen for a one-year term. The senatorial districts consisted either of one or more entire counties; or a contiguous area within a single county. The counties which were divided into more than one senatorial district were New York (nine districts), Kings (eight), Bronx (three), Erie (three), Monroe (two), Queens (two) and Westchester (two). The assembly districts were made up of contiguous area, all within the same county.

At this time there were two major political parties: the Republican Party and the Democratic Party. The Socialist Party also nominated tickets.

== Elections ==
The 1923 New York state election, was held on November 6. The only statewide elective office up for election was a judgeship on the New York Court of Appeals which was carried by Democrat Irving Lehman who had been endorsed by the Republicans.

No women were elected to the legislature.

== Sessions ==
The legislature met for the regular session at the State Capitol in Albany on January 2, 1924; and adjourned in the morning of April 11.

H. Edmund Machold (Rep.) was re-elected Speaker.

== State Senate ==
=== Districts ===
- 1st District: Nassau and Suffolk counties
- 2nd and 3rd District: Parts of Queens County, i.e. the Borough of Queens
- 4th, 5th, 6th, 7th, 8th, 9th, 10th and 11th District: Parts of Kings County, i.e. the Borough of Brooklyn
- 12th, 13th, 14th, 15th, 16th, 17th, 18th, 19th and 20th District: Parts of New York County, i.e. the Borough of Manhattan
- 21st, 22nd and 23rd District: Parts of Bronx County, i.e. the Borough of the Bronx
- 24th District: Richmond County, i.e. the Borough of Richmond (now the Borough of Staten Island), and Rockland County
- 25th District: Part of Westchester County
- 26th District: Cortlandt, Greenburgh, Mount Pleasant, Ossining and part of Yonkers; in Westchester County
- 27th District: Orange and Sullivan counties
- 28th District: Columbia, Dutchess and Putnam counties
- 29th District: Delaware, Greene and Ulster counties
- 30th District: Albany County
- 31st District: Rensselaer County
- 32nd District: Saratoga and Schenectady counties
- 33rd District: Clinton, Essex, Warren and Washington counties
- 34th District: Franklin and St. Lawrence counties
- 35th District: Fulton, Hamilton, Herkimer and Lewis counties
- 36th District: Oneida County
- 37th District: Jefferson and Oswego counties
- 38th District: Onondaga County
- 39th District: Madison, Montgomery, Otsego and Schoharie counties
- 40th District: Broome, Chenango and Cortland counties
- 41st District: Chemung, Schuyler, Tioga and Tompkins counties
- 42nd District: Cayuga, Seneca and Wayne counties
- 43rd District: Ontario, Steuben and Yates counties
- 44th District: Allegany, Genesee, Livingston and Wyoming
- 45th and 46th District: Monroe County
- 47th District: Niagara and Orleans counties
- 48th, 49th and 50th District: Erie County
- 51st District: Cattaraugus and Chautauqua counties

=== Members ===
The asterisk (*) denotes members of the previous Legislature who continued in office as members of this Legislature.

Note: For brevity, the chairmanships omit the words "...the Committee on (the)..."

District	Senator	Party	Notes
1st	George L. Thompson*	Republican	
2nd	Frank Giorgio*	Democrat	Chairman of Public Printing
3rd	Peter J. McGarry*	Democrat	Chairman of Internal Affairs
4th	Philip M. Kleinfeld*	Democrat	Chairman of Revision
5th	Daniel F. Farrell*	Democrat	Chairman of Affairs of Cities
6th	James A. Higgins*	Democrat	Chairman of Privileges and Elections
7th	John A. Hastings*	Democrat	Chairman of Printed and Engrossed Bills
8th	William L. Love*	Democrat	Chairman of Penal Institutions
9th	Charles E. Russell*	Democrat	Chairman of Banks
10th	Jeremiah F. Twomey*	Democrat	Chairman of Public Service
11th	Daniel J. Carroll*	Democrat	Chairman of Public Health
12th	Jimmy Walker*	Democrat	Temporary President; Chairman of Rules
13th	Ellwood M. Rabenold*	Democrat	Chairman of Conservation
14th	Bernard Downing*	Democrat	Chairman of Finance
15th	Nathan Straus Jr.*	Democrat	Chairman of Agriculture
16th	Thomas I. Sheridan*	Democrat	Chairman of Taxation and Retrenchment
17th	Meyer Levy*	Democrat	Chairman of General Laws
18th	vacant	Salvatore A. Cotillo was elected on Nov. 6, 1923, to the NY Supreme Court	
18th	Martin J. Kennedy	Democrat	elected to fill vacancy on January 8, 1924
19th	Duncan T. O'Brien*	Democrat	Chairman of Military Affairs
20th	Michael E. Reiburn*	Democrat	Chairman of Labor and Industries
21st	Henry G. Schackno*	Democrat	Chairman of Judiciary
22nd	Benjamin Antin*	Democrat	Chairman of Education
23rd	John J. Dunnigan*	Democrat	Chairman of Insurance
24th	Mark W. Allen*	Democrat	Chairman of Commerce and Navigation
25th	Walter W. Westall*	Republican	
26th	Seabury C. Mastick*	Republican	
27th	Caleb H. Baumes*	Republican	
28th	J. Griswold Webb*	Republican	
29th	Arthur F. Bouton*	Republican	
30th	William T. Byrne*	Democrat	Chairman of Codes
31st	John P. Ryan*	Democrat	Chairman of Affairs of Villages
32nd	Frederick W. Kavanaugh*	Republican	
33rd	Mortimer Y. Ferris*	Republican	
34th	Warren T. Thayer*	Republican	
35th	Theodore Douglas Robinson*	Republican	
36th	Frederick M. Davenport*	Republican	on November 4, 1924, elected to the 69th U.S. Congress
37th	Willard S. Augsbury*	Republican	
38th	George R. Fearon*	Republican	
39th	Allen J. Bloomfield*	Republican	
40th	Clayton R. Lusk*	Republican	Minority Leader
41st	Seymour Lowman*	Republican	on November 4, 1924, elected Lieutenant Governor
42nd	Charles J. Hewitt*	Republican	
43rd	Ernest E. Cole*	Republican	
44th	John Knight*	Republican	
45th	James L. Whitley*	Republican	
46th	Homer E. A. Dick*	Republican	
47th	William W. Campbell*	Republican	
48th	Parton Swift*	Republican	
49th	Robert C. Lacey*	Democrat	Chairman of Canals
50th	Leonard W. H. Gibbs*	Republican	
51st	DeHart H. Ames*	Republican	

=== Employees ===
- Clerk: Dominick F. Mullaney
- Sergeant-at-Arms: Ralph D. Paoli
- Assistant Sergeant-at-Arms:
- Principal Doorkeeper:
- First Assistant Doorkeeper:
- Stenographer: Michael Degnan

== State Assembly ==
=== Assemblymen ===
Note: For brevity, the chairmanships omit the words "...the Committee on (the)..."

District		Assemblymen	Party	Notes
Albany	1st	William J. Snyder	Democrat	
Albany	2nd	John A. Boyle*	Democrat	
Albany	3rd	Frank A. Wilson*	Democrat	
Allegany		Cassius Congdon	Republican	
Bronx	1st	Nicholas J. Eberhard*	Democrat	
Bronx	2nd	Lester W. Patterson*	Democrat	
Bronx	3rd	Julius S. Berg*	Democrat	
Bronx	4th	Louis A. Schoffel*	Democrat	
Bronx	5th	Harry A. Samberg	Democrat	
Bronx	6th	Thomas J. McDonald*	Democrat	
Bronx	7th	John F. Reidy	Democrat	
Bronx	8th	Joseph E. Kinsley	Democrat	
Broome	1st	Edmund B. Jenks*	Republican	Chairman of Judiciary
Broome	2nd	Forman E. Whitcomb*	Republican	Chairman of Soldiers' Home
Cattaraugus		Leigh G. Kirkland*	Republican	Chairman of Excise
Cayuga		Sanford G. Lyon*	Republican	
Chautauqua	1st	Adolf F. Johnson*	Republican	
Chautauqua	2nd	Joseph A. McGinnies*	Republican	Chairman of Ways and Means
Chemung		Hovey E. Copley	Republican	
Chenango		Bert Lord	Republican	
Clinton		George W. Gilbert*	Republican	
Columbia		Lewis F. Harder	Republican	
Cortland		Irving F. Rice*	Republican	Chairman of Affairs of Villages
Delaware		Ralph H. Loomis	Republican	
Dutchess	1st	Howard N. Allen*	Republican	
Dutchess	2nd	John M. Hackett*	Republican	Chairman of General Laws
Erie	1st	William J. Hickey*	Republican	
Erie	2nd	Henry W. Hutt*	Republican	
Erie	3rd	Charles D. Stickney	Republican	died on March 2, 1924
Erie	4th	John J. Meegan*	Democrat	
Erie	5th	Ansley B. Borkowski	Republican	
Erie	6th	Charles A. Freiberg*	Republican	
Erie	7th	Edmund F. Cooke*	Republican	
Erie	8th	Nelson W. Cheney*	Republican	Chairman of Banks
Essex		Fred L. Porter*	Republican	
Franklin		George J. Moore	Republican	
Fulton and Hamilton		Eberly Hutchinson*	Republican	Chairman of Insurance
Genesee		Charles P. Miller*	Republican	Chairman of Labor and Industry
Greene		Ellis W. Bentley*	Republican	
Herkimer		Frederic S. Cole*	Republican	Chairman of Public Education
Jefferson		H. Edmund Machold*	Republican	re-elected Speaker; Chairman of Rules
Kings	1st	Charles F. Cline	Democrat	
Kings	2nd	Murray Hearn	Democrat	
Kings	3rd	Frank J. Taylor*	Democrat	
Kings	4th	Peter A. McArdle*	Democrat	
Kings	5th	Joseph C. H. Flynn	Republican	
Kings	6th	Joseph Reich*	Democrat	
Kings	7th	John J. Howard*	Democrat	
Kings	8th	Michael J. Reilly*	Democrat	
Kings	9th	Richard J. Tonry*	Democrat	
Kings	10th	Bernard F. Gray*	Democrat	
Kings	11th	Edward J. Coughlin*	Democrat	
Kings	12th	Marcellus H. Evans*	Democrat	
Kings	13th	William A. Donnelly*	Democrat	
Kings	14th	Joseph R. Blake*	Democrat	
Kings	15th	John E. McCarthy	Democrat	
Kings	16th	Maurice Z. Bungard	Democrat	
Kings	17th	Julius Ruger*	Democrat	
Kings	18th	Irwin Steingut*	Democrat	
Kings	19th	Anthony L. Palma	Democrat	
Kings	20th	Frank A. Miller*	Democrat	
Kings	21st	Walter F. Clayton*	Republican	Chairman of Charitable and Religious Societies
Kings	22nd	Howard C. Franklin*	Democrat	
Kings	23rd	Joseph F. Ricca*	Republican	
Lewis		Miller B. Moran*	Republican	
Livingston		Lewis G. Stapley*	Republican	Chairman of Motor Vehicles
Madison		J. Arthur Brooks*	Republican	
Monroe	1st	Russell B. Griffith*	Republican	
Monroe	2nd	Simon L. Adler*	Republican	Majority Leader
Monroe	3rd	Vincent B. Murphy*	Republican	Chairman of Cities; on November 4, 1924, elected State Comptroller
Monroe	4th	Gilbert L. Lewis*	Republican	
Monroe	5th	W. Ray Austin*	Republican	
Montgomery		Samuel W. McCleary*	Republican	Chairman of Public Printing
Nassau	1st	Edwin W. Wallace	Republican	
Nassau	2nd	F. Trubee Davison*	Republican	Chairman of Taxation and Retrenchment
New York	1st	Peter J. Hamill*	Democrat	
New York	2nd	Frank R. Galgano*	Democrat	
New York	3rd	Thomas F. Burchill*	Democrat	
New York	4th	Samuel Mandelbaum*	Democrat	
New York	5th	Frank A. Carlin	Democrat	
New York	6th	Morris Weinfeld	Democrat	
New York	7th	Victor R. Kaufmann*	Republican	Chairman of Military Affairs
New York	8th	Henry O. Kahan*	Democrat	
New York	9th	John H. Conroy*	Democrat	
New York	10th	Phelps Phelps	Republican	
New York	11th	Samuel I. Rosenman*	Democrat	
New York	12th	Paul T. Kammerer Jr.	Democrat	
New York	13th	John P. Nugent*	Democrat	
New York	14th	Frederick L. Hackenburg*	Democrat	
New York	15th	Joseph Steinberg*	Republican	
New York	16th	Maurice Bloch*	Democrat	Minority Leader
New York	17th	Meyer Alterman*	Democrat	
New York	18th	Owen M. Kiernan*	Democrat	
New York	19th	James Male*	Democrat	
New York	20th	Louis A. Cuvillier*	Democrat	
New York	21st	Henri W. Shields*	Democrat	
New York	22nd	Joseph A. Gavagan*	Democrat	
New York	23rd	Nelson Ruttenberg	Democrat	
Niagara	1st	Mark T. Lambert	Republican	
Niagara	2nd	Frank S. Hall*	Republican	Chairman of Social Welfare
Oneida	1st	John C. Devereux	Republican	
Oneida	2nd	Russell G. Dunmore*	Republican	Chairman of Claims
Oneida	3rd	George J. Skinner	Republican	
Onondaga	1st	Horace M. Stone*	Republican	
Onondaga	2nd	George M. Haight	Democrat	
Onondaga	3rd	Richard B. Smith	Republican	
Ontario		Charles C. Sackett*	Republican	Chairman of Revision
Orange	1st	Clemence C. Smith*	Republican	Chairman of Printed and Engrossed Bills
Orange	2nd	Charles L. Mead*	Republican	Chairman of Public Institutions
Orleans		Frank H. Lattin*	Republican	Chairman of Public Health
Oswego		Victor C. Lewis	Republican	
Otsego		Julian C. Smith*	Republican	
Putnam		John R. Yale*	Republican	Chairman of Public Service
Queens	1st	Henry M. Dietz	Democrat	
Queens	2nd	Owen J. Dever*	Democrat	
Queens	3rd	Alfred J. Kennedy*	Democrat	
Queens	4th	D. Lacy Dayton	Republican	
Queens	5th	William F. Brunner*	Democrat	
Queens	6th	Paul P. Gallagher*	Democrat	
Rensselaer	1st	John H. Westbrook	Democrat	
Rensselaer	2nd	Henry Meurs	Republican	
Richmond	1st	William S. Hart	Democrat	
Richmond	2nd	William L. Vaughan*	Democrat	
Rockland		Walter S. Gedney	Republican	
St. Lawrence	1st	William A. Laidlaw*	Republican	
St. Lawrence	2nd	Walter L. Pratt*	Republican	
Saratoga		Burton D. Esmond*	Republican	Chairman of Codes
Schenectady	1st	Charles W. Merriam	Republican	
Schenectady	2nd	William M. Nicoll	Republican	
Schoharie		Kenneth H. Fake*	Republican	
Schuyler		William Wickham	Republican	
Seneca		William H. Van Cleef	Republican	
Steuben	1st	Wilson Messer	Republican	
Steuben	2nd	Leon F. Wheatley*	Republican	
Suffolk	1st	John G. Peck*	Republican	Chairman of Conservation
Suffolk	2nd	John Boyle Jr.	Republican	
Sullivan		Guernsey T. Cross*	Democrat	
Tioga		Daniel P. Witter*	Republican	Chairman of Agriculture
Tompkins		James R. Robinson*	Republican	
Ulster		Simon B. Van Wagenen*	Republican	Chairman of Internal Affairs
Warren		Milton N. Eldridge*	Republican	
Washington		Herbert A. Bartholomew*	Republican	Chairman of Canals
Wayne		George S. Johnson	Republican	
Westchester	1st	Thomas Channing Moore*	Republican	Chairman of Commerce and Navigation
Westchester	2nd	Herbert B. Shonk*	Republican	
Westchester	3rd	Milan E. Goodrich*	Republican	Chairman of Penal Institutions
Westchester	4th	Alexander H. Garnjost	Republican	
Westchester	5th	Arthur I. Miller*	Democrat	
Wyoming		Webb A. Joiner*	Republican	
Yates		James H. Underwood	Republican	

=== Employees ===
- Clerk: Fred W. Hammond

== Sources ==
- Members of the New York Assembly (1920s) at Political Graveyard
- HUTCHINSON HEADS INSURANCE COMMITTEE AND MADE MEMBER OF IMPORTANT WAYS AND MEANS in The Morning Herald, of Gloversville, on January 8, 1924 (pg. 8)
