= Samuel W. McCleary =

American politician

Samuel Wilson McCleary (March 21, 1889 – August 6, 1951) was an American businessman and politician from New York.

== Life ==
McCleary was born on March 21, 1889, in Amsterdam, New York, the son of Ezekiel McCleary and Martha Wilson.

McCleary graduating from Amsterdam High School in 1909. He then spent two years in the Lowell Textile School, where he studied chemistry and dyeing. After leaving school, he briefly travelled for a dye firm. He then began working for McCleary, Wallin & Crouse, an Amsterdam rug and carpet manufacturing firm his father and uncle were involved in. By 1921, he was in charge of one of the departments in the plant. In 1916, he served in Company H, 2nd New York National Guard on the Mexican border. He served in that company again in 1917, during World War I, until he was honorably discharged.

In 1920, McCleary was elected to the New York State Assembly as a Republican, representing Montgomery County. He served in the Assembly in 1921, 1922, 1923, 1924, 1925, and 1926.

McClearly later worked in the insurance business. In 1936, he began working for the Bigelow-Sanford Carpet Company. By the time he died, he was the night superintendent of the company's woolen mill.

McClearly attended the First Reformed Church of Amsterdam in 1921. He was a member of the Freemasons, the Royal Arch Masonry, the Royal and Select Masters, the Shriners, and the Elks. In 1914, he married Florence Venner, who died in 1930. In 1931, he married Harriet Holman of Gloversville. His children were Mrs. J. Gardner Zerby, Samuel W., and E. Stuart. By the time he died, he attended the Second Presbyterian Church.

McCleary died at home on August 6, 1951. He was buried in Green Hill Cemetery.

New York State Assembly
Preceded by Alton A. Walrath	New York State Assembly; Montgomery County; 1921–1926	Succeeded by Rufus Richtmyer
