= 144th New York State Legislature =

New York state legislative session

| ← | 143rd | 145th | → |
- New York State Capitol (2009)

Overview
- Legislative body: New York State Legislature
- Jurisdiction: New York, United States
- Term: January 1 – December 31, 1921

Senate
- Members: 51
- President: Lt. Gov. Jeremiah Wood (R)
- Temporary President: Clayton R. Lusk (R)
- Party control: Republican (39–11–1)

Assembly
- Members: 150
- Speaker: H. Edmund Machold (R)
- Party control: Republican (120–28–3)

Sessions
- 1st: January 5 – April 16, 1921

The 144th New York State Legislature, consisting of the New York State Senate and the New York State Assembly, met from January 5 to April 16, 1921, during the first year of Nathan L. Miller's governorship, in Albany.

== Background ==
Under the provisions of the New York Constitution of 1894, re-apportioned in 1917, 51 Senators and 150 assemblymen were elected in single-seat districts; senators for a two-year term, assemblymen for a one-year term. The senatorial districts consisted either of one or more entire counties; or a contiguous area within a single county. The counties which were divided into more than one senatorial district were New York (nine districts), Kings (eight), Bronx (three), Erie (three), Monroe (two), Queens (two) and Westchester (two). The Assembly districts were made up of contiguous area, all within the same county.

At this time there were two major political parties: the Republican Party and the Democratic Party. The Socialist Party, the Farmer–Labor Party, the Prohibition Party and the Socialist Labor Party also nominated tickets. The Prohibition Party endorsed the "dry" candidates for the Legislature, mostly Republicans, and nominated own candidates only where the major parties' candidates were "wet". In most of the Socialist strongholds in New York City, Democrats and Republicans nominated fusion candidates.

== Elections ==
The 1920 New York state election, was held on November 2. Nathan L. Miller and Jeremiah Wood were elected Governor and Lieutenant Governor, both Republicans. The incumbent Governor Al Smith ran on the Democratic ticket for re-election, but was defeated by Miller with a plurality of about 75,000 votes out of more than two and a half million.

The other eight statewide elective offices up for election were also carried by the Republicans. The approximate party strength at this election, as expressed by the vote for governor, was: Republicans 1,335,000; Democrats 1,260,000; Socialists 172,000; Farmer-Labor 68,000; Prohibition 36,000; and Socialist Labor 5,000.

Only one woman was elected to the State Assembly: Marguerite L. Smith (Rep.), an athletics teacher, of Harlem, became the first woman to serve a second term in the Assembly.

== Sessions ==
The Legislature met for the regular session at the State Capitol in Albany on January 5, 1921.

H. Edmund Machold (Rep.) was elected Speaker with 114 votes against 25 for Charles D. Donohue (Dem.) and 2 for Charles Solomon (Soc.).

Clayton R. Lusk (Rep.) was elected Temporary President of the State Senate with 38 votes against 8 for Jimmy Walker (Dem.) and one for Edmund Seidel (Soc.).

At the beginning of the session, resolutions were offered to expel Henry Jager, Samuel Orr and Charles Solomon from the Assembly for being Socialists and thus unfit to sit, which were referred to the Committee on the Judiciary. On January 12, another resolution was offered, contesting the eligibility of Henry Jager because he was alleged to be a resident of New Jersey.

On March 29, the Assembly Committee on the Judiciary presented its final report in the matter of the eligibility of Henry Jager. The majority (Rowe, Lown, T. K. Smith and Everett) concluded that Jager was a resident of Maywood, New Jersey, and therefore was ineligible for office under the provisions of the Public Officers Law of New York. A minority—in one report by Bloch and McKee, and another by Stitt and Ullman—concluded that Jager was a resident of Brooklyn. On the next day, Jager's seat was declared vacant by a vote of 77 to 62.

On April 4, the members who had offered the resolutions against Orr and Solomon attempted to call the resolutions up, which was voted down. Thus the resolutions remained on the table of the Committee on the Judiciary until the end of the session, without any action taken.

== State Senate ==
=== Districts ===
- 1st District: Nassau and Suffolk counties
- 2nd and 3rd District: Parts of Queens County, i.e the Borough of Queens
- 4th, 5th, 6th, 7th, 8th, 9th, 10th and 11th District: Parts of Kings County, i.e. the Borough of Brooklyn
- 12th, 13th, 14th, 15th, 16th, 17th, 18th, 19th and 20th District: Parts of New York County, i.e. the Borough of Manhattan
- 21st, 22nd and 23rd District: Parts of Bronx County, i.e. the Borough of the Bronx
- 24th District: Richmond County, i.e. the Borough of Richmond (now the Borough of Staten Island), and Rockland County
- 25th District: Part of Westchester County
- 26th District: Cortlandt, Greenburgh, Mount Pleasant, Ossining and part of Yonkers; in Westchester County
- 27th District: Orange and Sullivan counties
- 28th District: Columbia, Dutchess and Putnam counties
- 29th District: Delaware, Greene and Ulster counties
- 30th District: Albany County
- 31st District: Rensselaer County
- 32nd District: Saratoga and Schenectady counties
- 33rd District: Clinton, Essex, Warren and Washington counties
- 34th District: Franklin and St. Lawrence counties
- 35th District: Fulton, Hamilton, Herkimer and Lewis counties
- 36th District: Oneida County
- 37th District: Jefferson and Oswego counties
- 38th District: Onondaga County
- 39th District: Madison, Montgomery, Otsego and Schoharie counties
- 40th District: Broome, Chenango and Cortland counties
- 41st District: Chemung, Schuyler, Tioga and Tompkins counties
- 42nd District: Cayuga, Seneca and Wayne counties
- 43rd District: Ontario, Steuben and Yates counties
- 44th District: Allegany, Genesee, Livingston and Wyoming
- 45th and 46th District: Monroe County
- 47th District: Niagara and Orleans counties
- 48th, 49th and 50th District: Erie County
- 51st District: Cattaraugus and Chautauqua counties

=== Members ===
The asterisk (*) denotes members of the previous Legislature who continued in office as members of this Legislature. William T. Simpson, Martin G. McCue, Frank L. Wiswall, Warren T. Thayer, George R. Fearon, Allen J. Bloomfield and DeHart H. Ames changed from the Assembly to the Senate.

Note: For brevity, the chairmanships omit the words "...the Committee on (the)..."

| District | Senator | Party | Notes |
|---|---|---|---|
| 1st | George L. Thompson* | Rep./Proh. | re-elected; Chairman of Conservation |
| 2nd | John L. Karle* | Republican | re-elected; Chairman of Commerce and Navigation |
| 3rd | Peter J. McGarry* | Democrat | re-elected |
| 4th | Maxwell S. Harris | Republican | |
| 5th | Daniel F. Farrell* | Democrat | re-elected |
| 6th | William T. Simpson* | Republican | Chairman of Penal Institutions |
| 7th | Charles C. Lockwood* | Republican | re-elected; Chairman of Public Education |
| 8th | Alvah W. Burlingame Jr.* | Republican | re-elected; Chairman of Judiciary |
| 9th | George M. Reischmann | Republican | |
| 10th | Jeremiah F. Twomey* | Democrat | re-elected |
| 11th | Abraham L. Katlin | Republican | unsuccessfully contested by Daniel J. Carroll (D) |
| 12th | Jimmy Walker* | Democrat | re-elected; Minority Leader |
| 13th | John J. Boylan* | Democrat | re-elected |
| 14th | Bernard Downing* | Dem./Rep. | re-elected |
| 15th | Nathan Straus Jr. | Democrat | |
| 16th | Martin G. McCue* | Democrat | resigned on June 17, to accept an appointment as Clerk of the New York Co. Surrogate's Court |
| 17th | Schuyler M. Meyer | Republican | Chairman of Privileges and Elections |
| 18th | Salvatore A. Cotillo* | Democrat | re-elected |
| 19th | William Duggan | Republican | |
| 20th | Ward V. Tolbert | Republican | |
| 21st | Henry G. Schackno* | Democrat | re-elected |
| 22nd | Edmund Seidel | Socialist | |
| 23rd | George H. Taylor | Republican | contested; seat vacated on February 15 |
| 23rd | John J. Dunnigan | Democrat | took his seat on February 17 |
| 24th | C. Ernest Smith | Republican | |
| 25th | George T. Burling* | Rep./Proh. | re-elected; Chairman of Revision |
| 26th | Holland S. Duell | Republican | Chairman of Labor and Industry |
| 27th | Caleb H. Baumes* | Rep./Proh. | re-elected; Chairman of Printed and Engrossed Bills |
| 28th | James E. Towner* | Rep./Proh. | re-elected; Chairman of Insurance |
| 29th | Charles W. Walton* | Rep./Proh. | re-elected; Chairman of Codes |
| 30th | Frank L. Wiswall* | Republican | |
| 31st | Frederick E. Draper | Republican | |
| 32nd | Frederick W. Kavanaugh | Rep./Proh. | |
| 33rd | Mortimer Y. Ferris* | Rep./Proh. | re-elected; Chairman of Agriculture |
| 34th | Warren T. Thayer* | Rep./Proh. | |
| 35th | Theodore Douglas Robinson | Republican | Chairman of Civil Service |
| 36th | Frederick M. Davenport* | Rep./Proh. | re-elected; Chairman of Taxation and Retrenchment |
| 37th | Fred B. Pitcher* | Rep./Proh. | re-elected; Chairman of Banks |
| 38th | George R. Fearon* | Republican | Chairman of Public Printing |
| 39th | Allen J. Bloomfield* | Rep./Proh. | |
| 40th | Clayton R. Lusk* | Rep./Proh. | re-elected; elected Temporary President; Chairman of Rules |
| 41st | Seymour Lowman* | Rep./Proh. | re-elected; Chairman of Internal Affairs |
| 42nd | Charles J. Hewitt* | Rep./Proh. | re-elected; Chairman of Finance |
| 43rd | William A. Carson* | Rep./Proh. | re-elected; Chairman of Affairs of Villages |
| 44th | John Knight* | Rep./Proh. | re-elected; Chairman of Public Service |
| 45th | James L. Whitley* | Republican | re-elected; Chairman of Canals |
| 46th | John B. Mullan* | Rep./Proh. | re-elected; Chairman of Affairs of Cities; resigned on July 28 to become Postmaster of Rochester |
| 47th | William W. Campbell | Rep./Proh. | |
| 48th | Parton Swift* | Rep./Proh. | re-elected; Chairman of Military Affairs |
| 49th | William E. Martin | Rep./Proh. | |
| 50th | Leonard W. H. Gibbs* | Rep./Proh. | re-elected; Chairman of Public Health |
| 51st | DeHart H. Ames* | Rep./Proh. | |

=== Employees ===
- Clerk: Ernest A. Fay
- Sergeant-at-Arms: Charles R. Hotaling
- Assistant Sergeant-at-Arms: Henry Witbeck Jr.
- Principal Doorkeeper: Lee V. Gardner
- First Assistant Doorkeeper: Frank Heilbron
- Stenographer: John K. Marshall

== State Assembly ==
Note: For brevity, the chairmanships omit the words "...the Committee on (the)..."

=== Assemblymen ===
| District | | Assemblymen | Party | Notes |
|---|---|---|---|---|
| Albany | 1st | Edgar C. Campbell* | Republican | |
| Albany | 2nd | John T. Merrigan | Democrat | |
| Albany | 3rd | James M. Gaffers | Republican | |
| Allegany | | William Duke Jr.* | Rep./Proh. | Chairman of Codes |
| Bronx | 1st | Albert H. Henderson* | Democrat | |
| Bronx | 2nd | Edward J. Flynn* | Democrat | on November 8, 1921, elected Sheriff of Bronx Co. |
| Bronx | 3rd | Benjamin Antin | Dem./Rep. | |
| Bronx | 4th | Samuel Orr* | Socialist | |
| Bronx | 5th | William Lyman | Dem./Rep. | |
| Bronx | 6th | Thomas J. McDonald* | Democrat | unsuccessfully contested by Henry V. Beecher (R) |
| Bronx | 7th | Joseph V. McKee* | Democrat | unsuccessfully contested by Charles Tremonti (R) |
| Bronx | 8th | Edward J. Walsh | Democrat | unsuccessfully contested by Charles A. Conner (R) |
| Broome | 1st | Edmund B. Jenks* | Rep./Proh. | |
| Broome | 2nd | Forman E. Whitcomb* | Rep./Proh. | |
| Cattaraugus | | Leigh G. Kirkland | Rep./Proh. | |
| Cayuga | | L. Ford Hager* | Rep./Proh. | Chairman of Penal Institutions |
| Chautauqua | 1st | Judson S. Wright | Rep./Proh. | |
| Chautauqua | 2nd | Joseph A. McGinnies* | Rep./Proh. | Chairman of Ways and Means |
| Chemung | | John J. Richford* | Rep./Proh. | Chairman of General Laws |
| Chenango | | Bert Lord* | Rep./Proh. | Chairman of Soldiers' Home; resigned on July 1, 1921, to take office as Director of the New York State Motor Vehicle Bureau |
| Clinton | | Charles M. Harrington* | Rep./Proh. | |
| Columbia | | George H. Finch | Rep./Proh./Soc. | |
| Cortland | | Irving F. Rice* | Rep./Proh. | |
| Delaware | | Lincoln R. Long* | Rep./Proh. | |
| Dutchess | 1st | J. Griswold Webb* | Rep./Proh. | |
| Dutchess | 2nd | Frank L. Gardner* | Rep./Proh. | Chairman of Insurance |
| Erie | 1st | George E. D. Brady* | Rep./Proh. | Chairman of Labor and Industries |
| Erie | 2nd | John W. Slacer* | Rep./Proh. | |
| Erie | 3rd | August Seelbach* | Rep./Proh. | |
| Erie | 4th | Andrew T. Beasley* | Democrat | |
| Erie | 5th | Ansley B. Borkowski | Rep./Proh. | |
| Erie | 6th | George H. Rowe* | Rep./Proh. | |
| Erie | 7th | Herbert A. Zimmerman* | Rep./Proh. | Chairman of Canals |
| Erie | 8th | Nelson W. Cheney* | Rep./Proh. | Chairman of Banks |
| Essex | | Fred L. Porter | Rep./Proh. | |
| Franklin | | Anson H. Ellsworth | Rep./Proh. | |
| Fulton and Hamilton | | Eberly Hutchinson* | Rep./Proh. | |
| Genesee | | Charles P. Miller* | Rep./Proh. | Chairman of Printed and Engrossed Bills |
| Greene | | Frank G. Jacobs* | Rep./Proh. | |
| Herkimer | | James A. Evans | Republican | |
| Jefferson | | H. Edmund Machold* | Rep./Proh./Soc. | elected Speaker; Chairman of Rules |
| Kings | 1st | John A. Warren | Republican | |
| Kings | 2nd | James J. Mullen* | Republican | |
| Kings | 3rd | Frank J. Taylor* | Democrat | |
| Kings | 4th | Peter A. McArdle* | Democrat | |
| Kings | 5th | James H. Caulfield Jr.* | Republican | Chairman of Commerce and Navigation |
| Kings | 6th | John R. Crews | Republican | |
| Kings | 7th | John J. Kelly* | Democrat | |
| Kings | 8th | Michael J. Reilly* | Democrat | |
| Kings | 9th | James T. Carroll* | Republican | |
| Kings | 10th | Leo V. Doherty* | Republican | |
| Kings | 11th | James F. Bly* | Republican | |
| Kings | 12th | James G. Moore | Republican | |
| Kings | 13th | John J. Wackerman | Democrat | |
| Kings | 14th | Henry Jager | Socialist | seat vacated on March 30 |
| Kings | 15th | John J. McLoughlin* | Democrat | |
| Kings | 16th | Leon G. Moses | Republican | |
| Kings | 17th | Frederick A. Wells* | Republican | Chairman of Military Affairs |
| Kings | 18th | Theodore Stitt* | Republican | |
| Kings | 19th | Francis X. Giaccone | Republican | |
| Kings | 20th | John O. Gempler* | Republican | |
| Kings | 21st | Walter F. Clayton | Republican | |
| Kings | 22nd | Louis J. Druss | Republican | |
| Kings | 23rd | Charles Solomon* | Socialist | Socialist Leader |
| Lewis | | Miller B. Moran | Republican | |
| Livingston | | George F. Wheelock* | Rep./Proh. | Chairman of Internal Affairs |
| Madison | | J. Arthur Brooks | Rep./Proh. | |
| Monroe | 1st | James A. Harris* | Rep./Proh. | Chairman of Public Education |
| Monroe | 2nd | Simon L. Adler* | Rep./Proh. | Majority Leader |
| Monroe | 3rd | Harry B. Crowley* | Republican | |
| Monroe | 4th | Gilbert L. Lewis | Republican | |
| Monroe | 5th | Franklin W. Judson* | Rep./Proh. | Chairman of Taxation and Retrenchment |
| Montgomery | | Samuel W. McCleary | Rep./Proh. | |
| Nassau | 1st | Thomas A. McWhinney* | Republican | Chairman of Affairs of Villages |
| Nassau | 2nd | Theodore Roosevelt Jr.* | Republican | resignation announced on March 15, after appointment as Assistant Secretary of the Navy |
| New York | 1st | Peter J. Hamill* | Democrat | |
| New York | 2nd | Frank R. Galgano | Democrat | |
| New York | 3rd | Thomas F. Burchill* | Democrat | |
| New York | 4th | Samuel Dickstein* | Dem./Rep. | |
| New York | 5th | Charles D. Donohue* | Democrat | Minority Leader |
| New York | 6th | Sol Ullman* | Rep./Dem. | |
| New York | 7th | Noel B. Fox* | Republican | |
| New York | 8th | Morris D. Reiss | Rep./Dem. | |
| New York | 9th | Edward R. Rayher | Republican | |
| New York | 10th | Bernard Aronson | Republican | |
| New York | 11th | Frederick H. Nichols | Republican | |
| New York | 12th | John J. O'Connor | Democrat | |
| New York | 13th | Robert B. Wallace* | Republican | |
| New York | 14th | Frederick L. Hackenburg | Democrat | |
| New York | 15th | Joseph Steinberg* | Republican | Chairman of Claims |
| New York | 16th | Maurice Bloch* | Democrat | |
| New York | 17th | Nathan Lieberman | Rep./Dem. | |
| New York | 18th | Owen M. Kiernan* | Democrat | |
| New York | 19th | Marguerite L. Smith* | Republican | Chairwoman of Social Welfare |
| New York | 20th | Mario G. DiPirro | Republican | |
| New York | 21st | John Clifford Hawkins* | Republican | |
| New York | 22nd | Michael E. Reiburn | Democrat | |
| New York | 23rd | George N. Jesse* | Republican | |
| Niagara | 1st | David E. Jeffery* | Rep./Proh. | |
| Niagara | 2nd | Nicholas V. V. Franchot II | Republican | |
| Oneida | 1st | Hartwell W. Booth* | Rep./Proh. | |
| Oneida | 2nd | Louis M. Martin* | Rep./Proh. | Chairman of Judiciary |
| Oneida | 3rd | Chauncey J. Williams* | Rep./Proh. | |
| Onondaga | 1st | Manuel J. Soule* | Republican | |
| Onondaga | 2nd | Gardner J. Chamberlin* | Republican | |
| Onondaga | 3rd | Thomas K. Smith | Republican | |
| Ontario | | Charles C. Sackett | Rep./Proh. | |
| Orange | 1st | Arthur E. Brundage* | Republican | |
| Orange | 2nd | Charles L. Mead* | Republican | Chairman of Public Institutions |
| Orleans | | Frank H. Lattin* | Rep./Proh. | Chairman of Public Health |
| Oswego | | Ezra A. Barnes | Republican | |
| Otsego | | Julian C. Smith | Rep./Proh. | |
| Putnam | | John R. Yale | Republican | |
| Queens | 1st | Peter A. Leininger* | Democrat | |
| Queens | 2nd | Bernard Schwab* | Democrat | |
| Queens | 3rd | Edward J. Neary* | Republican | |
| Queens | 4th | Nicholas M. Pette* | Republican | resigned on May 2 |
| Queens | 5th | Ralph Halpern* | Republican | |
| Queens | 6th | Henry Baum* | Republican | |
| Rensselaer | 1st | Hugh C. Morrissey* | Republican | |
| Rensselaer | 2nd | Arthur Cowee* | Rep./Proh. | |
| Richmond | 1st | Thomas F. Cosgrove* | Democrat | |
| Richmond | 2nd | Ernest V. Frerichs | Republican | |
| Rockland | | Gordon H. Peck* | Rep./Proh. | Chairman of Charitable and Religious Societies; died on February 18, 1921 |
| St. Lawrence | 1st | Frank L. Seaker* | Rep./Proh. | Chairman of Railroads |
| St. Lawrence | 2nd | Edward A. Everett* | Rep./Proh. | Chairman of Conservation |
| Saratoga | | Clarence C. Smith* | Rep./Proh. | |
| Schenectady | 1st | Harold E. Blodgett* | Rep./Proh. | |
| Schenectady | 2nd | William W. Campbell | Rep./Proh. | |
| Schoharie | | Harry M. Greenwald | Republican | |
| Schuyler | | Clarence W. Hausner* | Rep./Proh. | |
| Seneca | | George A. Dobson* | Republican | |
| Steuben | 1st | Ernest E. Cole* | Rep./Proh./Soc. | |
| Steuben | 2nd | Delevan C. Hunter* | Rep./Proh. | Chairman of Revision |
| Suffolk | 1st | John G. Downs* | Rep./Proh. | |
| Suffolk | 2nd | Paul Bailey | Republican | |
| Sullivan | | John G. Gray | Republican | |
| Tioga | | Daniel P. Witter* | Rep./Proh. | Chairman of Agriculture |
| Tompkins | | Casper Fenner* | Republican | Chairman of Electricity, Gas and Water Supply |
| Ulster | | Simon B. Van Wagenen* | Republican | |
| Warren | | Stewart MacFarland* | Rep./Proh. | |
| Washington | | Herbert A. Bartholomew | Republican | |
| Wayne | | Charles H. Betts* | Republican | Chairman of Public Printing |
| Westchester | 1st | Thomas Channing Moore* | Republican | |
| Westchester | 2nd | Walter W. Westall* | Republican | |
| Westchester | 3rd | Seabury C. Mastick | Republican | |
| Westchester | 4th | Mitchell A. Trahan Jr.* | Republican | |
| Westchester | 5th | George Blakely* | Republican | Chairman of Affairs of Cities |
| Wyoming | | Bert P. Gage* | Rep./Proh. | Chairman of Excise |
| Yates | | James M. Lown* | Republican | |

=== Employees ===
- Clerk: Fred W. Hammond
- Sergeant-at-Arms: Harry W. Haines
- Principal Doorkeeper: James B. Hulse
- First Assistant Doorkeeper: Walter S. Gay
- Second Assistant Doorkeeper: Charles H. Jackson
- Stenographer: George Munson
- Postmaster: James H. Underwood

== Sources ==
- Journal of the Senate (144th Session) (1921; Vol. I, January 5 to April 4)
- Journal of the Senate (144th Session) (1921; Vol. II, April 4 to 16)
- Journal of the Assembly (144th Session) (1921; Vol. I, January 5 to March 16)
- Journal of the Assembly (144th Session) (1921; Vol. II, March 16 to April 16)
- SENATE IS MEDIOCRE, SAYS CITIZENS UNION in NYT on July 15, 1921
- Manual for the Use of the Legislature of the State of New York prepared by Secretary of State John J. Lyons (1921)
