= C. Ernest Smith =

American politician

C. Ernest Smith (July 12, 1894 – July 28, 1970) was an American lawyer, politician, and judge from New York.

== Life ==
Smith was born on July 12, 1894, in Stapleton, Staten Island. He graduated from Curtis High School in 1913 and New York University School of Law in 1916. He then worked as a clerk for a large New York City law office. Shortly after passing the bar in 1917, he opened his own law office in New York City. In 1920, he moved his law office to Staten Island. He enlisted in the judge advocate's office during World War I.

In 1920, Smith was elected to the New York State Senate as a Republican, representing New York's 24th State Senate district. He served in the State Senate in 1921 and 1922.

In 1936, Smith was appointed Municipal Court Justice. In 1942, he was accused of committing graft and disbarment proceedings were brought up against him. He was later cleared of all charges.

Smith was president of the Richmond County Bar Association, the Staten Island Chamber of Commerce, and the Board of Visitors of the Willowbrook State School. He was a member of the Freemasons, the Elks, the Order of United American Mechanics, and Delta Theta Phi.

Smith died at Staten Island Hospital after a long illness on July 28, 1970.

New York State Senate
Preceded by John A. Lynch	New York State Senate; 24th District; 1921-1922	Succeeded by Mark W. Allen
