= Louis A. Schoffel =

American politician (1894–1946)

- Born: Louis Astor Schoffel; July 27, 1894; New York City, United States
- Died: July 8, 1946 (aged 51); Ridgefield, Connecticut, United States
- Burial place: Mount Hebron Cemetery, New York City
- Education: DeWitt Clinton High School, City College of New York, Long Island Medical College, New York Law School
- Occupations: lawyer, politician, judge
- Political party: Democrat

Louis Astor Schoffel (July 27, 1894 – July 8, 1946) was a Jewish-American lawyer, politician, and judge from New York.

== Life ==
Schoffel was born on July 27, 1894, on Orchard Street in New York City, New York, the son of Moses Schoffel and Kate Astor. His parents were Austrian immigrants who settled on the Lower East Side, where his father worked in the real estate business.

Schoffel graduated from DeWitt Clinton High School in 1912. He briefly attended the City College of New York and Long Island Medical College before deciding to study law. He entered the New York Law School in 1913, graduating from there with an LL.B. in 1916. He then spent a year working as a clerk for the law office of A. A. Silberberg at 256 Broadway. In 1917, he was admitted to the bar and became associated with Leon Kronfeld. A year later, he joined the firm Dechsler, Orenstein and Leff at 225 Fifth Avenue, where he worked for two years. In 1920, he established his own law office, first at 20 W. 20th Street and then at 291 Broadway. He later established his law office in the Bronx.

In 1921, Schoffel ran in the New York State Assembly as a Democrat, with the endorsement of the Republican Party, in the Bronx County 4th District, which at the time was a Socialist district. He was elected and served in the Assembly in 1922, 1923, 1924, and 1925. He then served as Registrar of Bronx County from 1926 to 1933. In 1933, Mayor John P. O'Brien appointed him a Justice on the Municipal Court to fill a vacancy. He was elected to a ten-year term later that year, and he was re-elected for another ten-year term in 1943.

Schoffel was a member of Temple Adath Israel and a trustee of Sinai Temple of the Bronx. He was a member of the Free Sons of Israel, the Bronx County Bar Association, the Freemasons, the Royal Arcanum, and the Elks. He was also a member of the landsmanshaftn Louis Fleischmann Benevolent Society and the First Kozower Benevolent Society. In 1921, he married Lena Zahn. Their children were Gloria Rita and Majorie Jean.

Schoffel died from a heart attack while on vacation at a hotel in Ridgefield, Connecticut on July 8, 1946. He was buried in Mount Hebron Cemetery.

New York State Assembly
Preceded by Samuel Orr	New York State Assembly; Bronx County, 4th District; 1922–1925	Succeeded by Herman M. Albert
