= James A. Higgins =

American politician

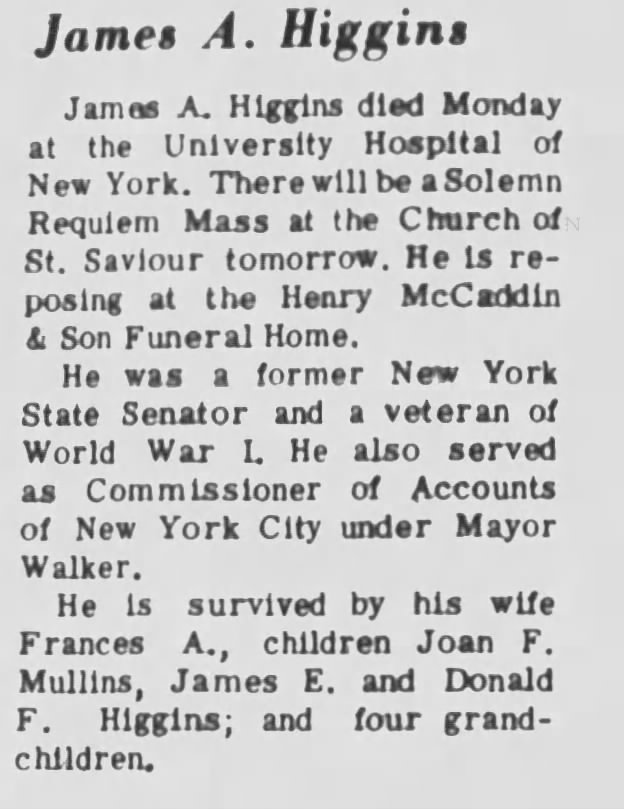
Obituary of James A. Higgins

James A. Higgins (c.1889 – November 26, 1962) was an American lawyer and politician from New York.

== Life ==
He was born in Brooklyn, the son of Thomas Louis Higgins and Mary Scott Higgins. He graduated from Erasmus Hall High School and Fordham University School of Law. He was admitted to the bar in 1916.

Higgins was a member of the New York State Senate (6th D.) from 1923 to 1926, sitting in the 146th, 147th, 148th and 149th New York State Legislatures; and was Chairman of the Committee on Privileges and Elections from 1923 to 1924.

In 1926, he married Frances Heaviside, a niece of Gov. Al Smith, and they had three children.

He was New York City Commissioner of Accounts, appointed by Mayor Jimmy Walker, from 1927 to 1932.

He died on November 26, 1962; and was buried at St. John Cemetery in Queens.

== Sources ==
- New York Red Book (1925; pg. 67)
- WARREN IS CHOSEN FOR POLICE HEAD; HIS POST TO HIGGINS in NYT on April 1, 1927 (subscription required)
- JAMES A. HIGGINS, EX-CITY AIDE, DIES in NYT on November 28, 1962 (subscription required)
- Higgins family at GenForum

New York State Senate
Preceded by William T. Simpson	New York State Senate; 6th District; 1923–1926	Succeeded by Marcellus H. Evans
