= Owen J. Dever =

American politician and library director

Owen J. Denver

Director of Queens Borough Public Library
- In office March 1925 – 1935

New York State Assembly
- In office 1921 – March 1925

Personal details
- Born: November 17, 1884 Edinburgh, Scotland
- Died: June 29, 1953 (aged 68) Queens, New York, New York, USA
- Party: Democratic Party
- Spouse: Madge

Owen J. Dever (November 17, 1884 – June 29, 1953) was a Scottish-American politician and library director from New York.

== Life ==
Dever was born on November 17, 1884, in Edinburgh, Scotland. He immigrated to America with his parents when he was four and lived at 374 Cherry Street in New York City. Dever attended the parochial school of St. Mary Church on Grand Street and La Salle Academy. In 1900, he moved to Queens, later settling in Ridgewood. He worked as a harness manufacturer, succeeding his father in 1908. In 1912, he was elected vice-president of the National Harness Manufacturer's Association. He also served as secretary and president of the New York Retail Harness Dealers' Association, being elected to the latter office in 1914.

== Career ==
In 1919, Mayor John F. Hylan appointed him to the board of trustees of the Queens Borough Public Library. He was elected secretary of the board in 1920 and 1921. In 1921, he was elected to the New York State Assembly as a Democrat, representing the Queens County 2nd District. He served in the Assembly in 1922, 1923, 1924, and 1925. He resigned from the Assembly in March 1925 following his appointment as director of the Queens Borough Public Library in a unanimous vote by the Library's board of trustees. He served as a temporary director in 1920, supported the New York City libraries in the Assembly (especially librarian pensions), and waged a successful campaign for a librarians' pension bill. He earned the displeasure of every New York City mayor from Walker to La Guardia, and he resigned as director in 1935 following a year-long investigation by Commissioner of Accounts Paul Blanshard.

Dever was a sachem of his local Improved Order of Red Men tribe and secretary of the United Civic Association, Second Ward, Queens County. He was a member of the Elks, the Ridgewood Park Board of Trade, the Newtown Exempt Volunteer Firemen's Association, the Ridgewood Citizens' Library Committee, and the Catholic Club of New York.

== Personal life ==
Denver was married to Madge, who died in 1950. He died in Kew Gardens General Hospital on June 29, 1953. He was buried in Calvary Cemetery.

New York State Assembly
Preceded by Bernard Schwab	New York State Assembly; Queens County, 2nd District; 1922–1925	Succeeded by John T. Hammond
