= Nicholas J. Eberhard =

American politician

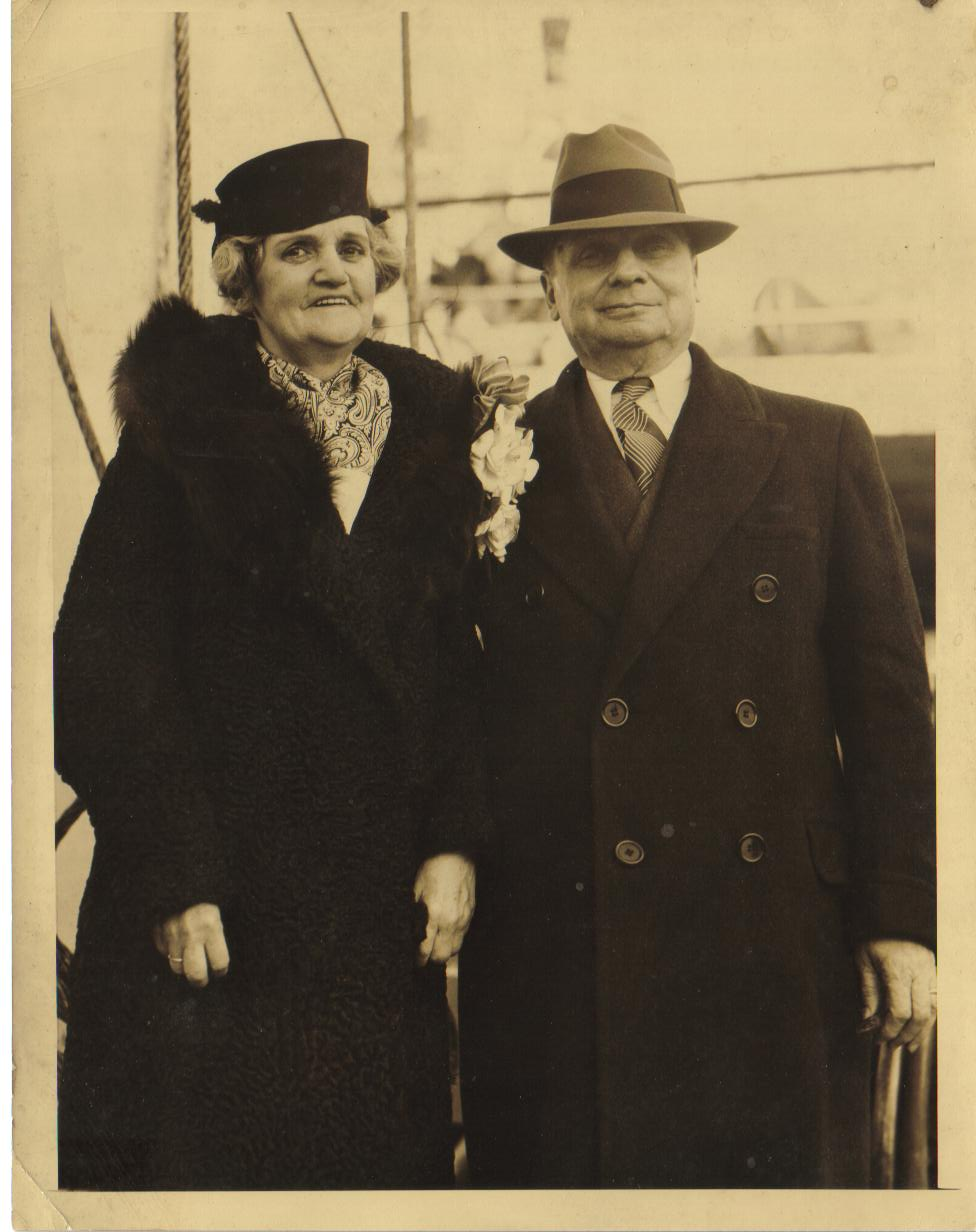
Photograph of Mr. and Mrs. Nicholas J. Eberhard

Nicholas Jacob Eberhard (May 30, 1874 – January 31, 1957) was an American politician from New York.

== Life ==
Eberhard was born on May 30, 1874, in New York City, New York. He was the only son of immigrants Nicholas Eberhard (April 7, 1836 – December 4, 1915) and Anna Eberhard nee Brown or Braun (November 8, 1837 – April 28, 1918). His parents migrated to America from Germany in 1860. His father worked in the City's Department of Bridges for 27 years. His siblings were Anna (Fleming); Josephine (Grove); and Catharine (Groneberg).

Nicholas, known as Jacob as a child, was raised in Manhattan's Lower East Side. After finishing public school in 1888, Eberhard began working as a printer. In 1894, he joined the New York County Clerk office, first and then as assistant equity clerk. In 1914, he was sent to organize and systematize the newly-created Bronx County clerk's office as its executive clerk. He continued working there until 1921. In 1913, he established the co-partnership of N. J. Eberhard & Company, which was in the real estate and general insurance business.

In 1921, Eberhard was elected to the New York State Assembly as a Democrat, representing the Bronx County 1st District. He served in the Assembly in 1922, 1923, 1924, 1925, 1926, 1927, 1928, 1929, 1930, 1931, 1932, and 1933. He then served as Bronx County Clerk from 1933 until his retirement in 1937. He was politically active in the Bronx Democratic Party from 1913 until 1956, serving as leader of the 1st Assembly District from 1931 to 1944.

Eberhard attended the St. Angela Merici's Church. He was a member of the Knights of Columbus and the Elks. He married Agnes Clark. Their children were Virginia, Nicholas Jr., and Catherine Anna.

Eberhard died at home on January 31, 1957. He was buried in Calvary Cemetery.

New York State Assembly
Preceded by Albert H. Henderson	New York State Assembly; Bronx County, 1st District; 1922–1933	Succeeded by Matthew J. H. McLaughlin
