= Lewis G. Stapley =

American politician

Lewis G. Stapley (February 4, 1879 – June 25, 1938) was an American automobile dealer and politician from New York.

== Life ==
Stapley was born on February 4, 1879, in Geneseo, New York, the son of Edward G. Stapley and Sarah E. Duff.

Stapley graduated from the Geneseo Normal School in 1901. He then spent the next five years teaching in South Lima, Elba, and Pavilion. He left teaching to become a pioneer automobile salesman in the state, later becoming president and manager of the Geneseo Automobile Company, Inc. He was also manager of the Empire State Automobile Merchants' Association, Inc and a member of the village board of trustees. One of the first men to own an automobile in the state, he instituted a good-will tour of early automobiles from Geneseo and Canadaigua, a long distance at the time. He also owned a large farm in Geneseo.

In 1921, Stapley was elected to the New York State Assembly as a Republican, representing Livingston County. He served in the Assembly in 1922, 1923, 1924, 1925, and 1926. In 1924, he was chairman of a joint legislative committee that considered changes in the Motor Vehicle Law, and he was chairman of the Assembly's Motor Vehicle Committee from 1924 to 1926. He also sponsored the legislation that created the Bureau of Motor Vehicles.

Stapley attended the Methodist Episcopal Church. He served as grand patriarch of the state grand embarkment of the Odd Fellows from 1924 to 1925. He was also a member of the Geneseo board of education and the Freemasons. In 1902, he married Mabel Sunderlin. Their children were Leon Ray, Muriel Irene, and Paul Eugene.

Stapley died in a hospital in Albany on June 25, 1938. He was buried in the family plot in Temple Hill Cemetery.

New York State Assembly
Preceded by George F. Wheelock	New York State Assembly; Livingston County; 1922–1926	Succeeded by A. Grant Stockweather
