= John P. Ryan (New York politician) =

American businessman and politician (1891 – 1964)

John Peter Ryan Sr. (June 28, 1891 – October 14, 1964) was an American businessman and politician from New York.

== Life ==
Ryan was born on June 28, 1891, in Troy, New York, the son of laborer Thomas Ryan and Mary Young. His parents were both Irish immigrants from County Tipperary.

Ryan attended the La Salle Institute. When he was barely 13, he began working as a check boy in Frear's department store. While working there, he attended night school at the YMCA and took a course at Troy Business College. By 1917, he worked his way up to becoming a furniture salesman at Frear's. That year, after America entered World War I, he left Frear's to work for the General Electric Company in Schenectady. He later worked for the mechanism assembly department at the United States Arsenal at Watervliet until 1919. He then returned to Troy and worked as a furniture salesman for the Gumbel Company. In 1922, he took a similar position at Reynolds Furniture Store.

In 1922, Ryan was elected to the New York State Senate as a Democrat, representing New York's 31st State Senate district. He served in the Senate in 1923 and 1924. He unsuccessfully ran for Rensselaer County Sheriff after his term in the Senate expired, and he was elected President of the Troy Common Council from 1927 to 1929.

In 1925, Ryan left Reynolds to open his own furniture store. In 1929, the day before the Wall Street crash, he signed a lease for a building he housed his furniture business. He bought a next-door building in 1939, and in 1946 to 1947 his business jointly occupied the two buildings. In 1954, he opened a second store. In 1960, he bought the Reynolds building he used to work at and opened a store there. He was president of the Troy Zoning Board and treasurer of the Troy Alderman's Association. His business, the John P. Ryan Furniture Stores, included the largest furniture store in downtown Troy. He was chairman of the Retail Merchants Bureau and an honorary member of the Downtown Fashion Guild. During World War II, he was chairman of the local Selective Service Board.

Deeply interested in sports, Ryan played amateur baseball and basketball with the YMCA and St. Joseph's. He purchased the Troy Basketball Association in 1922 and became president of the New York State Basketball League in 1923. He was a deputy grand knight of the Knights of Columbus. He was a member of St. Peter's Roman Catholic Church in the 1920s, but by the time he died he was a member of St. Francis de Sales Church and a former president of its Holy Name Society. He was married to Mary A. McCarthy. Their children were John P. Jr., James J., and William T.

Ryan died at the Samaritan Hospital on October 14, 1964. He was buried in St. Mary's Cemetery.

New York State Senate
Preceded by Frederick E. Draper	New York State Senate; 31st District; 1923–1924	Succeeded by John F. Williams
