= Ellwood M. Rabenold =

American lawyer and politician (1884–1970)

Ellwood Milton Rabenold (November 21, 1884 – July 6, 1970) was an American lawyer and politician.

== Life ==
Rabenold was born on November 21, 1884, in Chapmans, Leigh County, Pennsylvania, the son of Milton Rabenold and Rosa Caroline Folk.

Rabenold began attending Harvard College in 1900. He received a B.A. from there in 1904, an M.A. in 1905, and an LL.B. in 1908. He then moved to New York City, New York, where he initially worked as a managing clerk for Hyman & Campbell at 25 Broad St, and then junior assistant counsel of the Public Service Commission. He then became a member of the law firm Powers, Kaplan & Rabenold, which practiced at 154 Nassau St. In 1911, he began practicing law on his own, first in 25 Broad St. and then at 63 Wall St. He also worked as assistant Transfer Tax Attorney for the State Comptroller since 1911. In 1916, he became a member of the law firm Campbell, Rabenold & Scribner. He then was a member of the law firm Rabenold & Scribner in 1917, with an office at 61 Broadway. During World War I, he served as counsel for the War Emergency Committee of the Baking Industry in New York and vicinity, and was a member of the Mayor's Committee on National Defense and the Legal Advisory Board.

In 1922, Rabenold was elected to the New York State Senate as a Democrat, representing New York's 13th State Senate district. He served in the Senate in 1923 and 1924.

In September 1939, Rabenold was indicted of committing banking fraud by accepting nearly $100,000 in gratuities while serving as chairman of the directors and counsel of the Clinton Trust Company. In March 1940, he was found guilty for misappropriation of bank funds, forgery, and conspiracy. after an eight hour jury deliberation. A month later, he was sentenced to two concurrent terms of two and a half to seven years each in Sing Sing. His prison sentence was stayed while his lawyer, Charles H. Tuttle, sought an appeal, and he was released on bail from the Tombs during his appeal. He was disbarred in May due to his conviction. In May 1941, the Appellate Division unanimously upheld the conviction. He tried to appeal his case to the New York Court of Appeals, but in March 1942 the appeal failed and Judge Jonah J. Goldstein ordered him to begin his sentence in Sing Sing.

Rabenold later moved to Breinigsville, Pennsylvania, where he lived for 26 years.

Rabenold was a member of Phi Beta Kappa, the Harvard Club of New York, the New York City Bar Association, and the New York County Lawyers' Association. In 1913, he married Elizabeth Elvira Kushnast. Their children were Ruth, Ellwood Milton Jr., Richard Folk, John K., Charles F., Jane, Susan, and Beth. He was a member of the Advent Lutheran Church of Breinigsville.

Rabenold died in Shillington on July 6, 1970. He was buried in Charles Evans Cemetery in Reading.

New York State Senate
Preceded by John J. Boylan	New York State Senate; 13th District; 1923–1924	Succeeded by Thomas F. Burchill
