= Clarence W. Hausner =

American politician (1862–1942)

ClarenceW. Hausner

Member of the New York State Assembly from the Schuyler County district
- In office January 1, 1920 – December 31, 1922
- Preceded by: Hiram H. Graham
- Succeeded by: John W. Gurnett Jr.

Personal details
- Born: May 31, 1862 Ulysses, New York, U.S.
- Died: December 29, 1942 (aged 80)
- Resting place: Laurel Hill Cemetery, Odessa, New York, U.S.
- Party: Republican
- Spouse: Florence A. Smith (m. 1888)
- Children: 4
- Parent(s): Irving Hausner; Ruth Smith
- Profession: Politician, farmer

Clarence W. Hausner (May 31, 1862 – December 29, 1942) was an American farmer and politician from New York.

== Life ==
Hausner was born on May 31, 1862, in Ulysses, New York, the son of Irving Hausner and Ruth Smith.

Hausner lived on the Agard farm in North Settlement for 11 years, then moved to Odessa. He was a director and vice-president of the First National Bank of Odessa after it opened in 1930. He became a prominent farmer in the area. He served as a member of the Montour town board, chairman of the board of education, president of the Schuyler County sheep breeder's association, and secretary and treasurer of the farm bureau. He was a member of the Grange since he was 21.

In 1919, Hausner was elected to the New York State Assembly as a Republican, representing Schuyler County. He served in the Assembly in 1920, 1921, and 1922.

In 1888, Hausner married Florence Smith. Their children were Mrs. Ethel Lattin, Harold, Kenneth, and Edna. He was a vestryman of St. John's Episcopal Church. He was a member of the Independent Order of Odd Fellows.

Hausner died on December 29, 1942. He was buried in Laurel Hill Cemetery.

New York State Assembly
Preceded by Hiram H. Graham	New York State Assembly; Schuyler County; 1920-1922	Succeeded by John W. Gurnett, Jr.
