= John M. Hackett =

American politician

John Mulford Hackett (January 12, 1881 – January 3, 1954) was an American lawyer and politician from New York.

== Life ==
Hackett was born on January 12, 1881, in Hyde Park, New York. He was the son of John Hackett, an Irish immigrant and district attorney of Dutchess County, and Harriet V. Mulford, daughter of assemblyman David H. Mulford. His brother Henry was a lawyer who served as executor for the wills of both Franklin Delano Roosevelt and his mother Sara Delano Roosevelt.

Hackett attended Riverview Military Academy, Columbia University, and Albany Law School. He was admitted to the bar in 1904, and began practicing law in 1905. He joined his father's law practice in Poughkeepsie.

In 1921, Hackett was elected to the New York State Assembly as a Republican, representing the Dutchess County 2nd District. He served in the Assembly in 1922, 1923, 1924, 1925, 1926, 1927, 1928, 1929, and 1930. In 1923, he introduced a bill that authorized the construction of the Mid-Hudson Bridge.

Hackett was married to Charlotte Elizabeth Cunneen, daughter of New York Attorney General John Cunneen. He was a member of the Presbyterian Church.

Hackett died at home on January 3, 1954. He was buried in the family plot in Poughkeepsie Rural Cemetery.

New York State Assembly
Preceded by Frank L. Gardner	New York State Assembly; Dutchess County, 2nd District; 1922-1930	Succeeded by Charles F. Close
