= Lincoln R. Long =

American politician

Lincoln R. Long (February 3, 1861 – May 11, 1927) was an American teacher, principal, Methodist minister, and politician from New York.

== Life ==
Long was born on February 3, 1861, in Goulds, New York, the son of Joseph and Hannah Long. His father died while fighting in the Battle of Gettysburg. His mother died a year later, leaving him an orphan when he was four, along with his three brothers. He was raised in Jefferson, where he attended the rural schools.

In 1886, he moved to Hancock, where he worked as a stone cutter, later becoming quarry foreman. He graduated from the academy in Hancock in 1888 and obtained a state teaching certificate later that year. He then became principal of the union school in Clayville for a year. He then returned to Hancock, where he was the high school principal for the next seven years.

While in Hancock, he began studying theology at home became a lay preacher for the Methodist church. After he was admitted to the New York Methodist conference, he resigned as principal and became a pastor for the Callicoon Methodist church for four and a half years. He then worked as a pastor for the New Paltz Methodist church.

In 1900, Long became principal of the school in Walden, where he worked for the next four years. He then worked as pastor for the Trinity Methodist Church in Kingston. In 1906, he became minister of the Methodist church in Margaretville. In 1910, he became principal of the Margaretville high school. In 1912, he was made superintendent of schools for Andes, Middletown, and Roxbury. He resigned to take charge of his farm after his son was enlisted in the national service.

In 1918, Long was elected to the New York State Assembly as a Republican, representing Delaware County. He served in the Assembly in 1919, 1920, 1921, 1922, and 1923.

After he retired from public life, Long moved to a farm in the New Kingston valley, where he began working on historical sketches of old local families. The historical sketches were published into a book after his death.

In 1884, Long married Philinda J. Young. Their five children were Mrs. Courtney Sanford, Mrs. Hale Elliott, Mrs. James Elliott, Mrs. A. M. Suter, and Frank.

Long died at his daughter Courtney's home in Margaretville on May 11, 1927. He was buried in Margaretville Cemetery.

New York State Assembly
Preceded by James C. Nesbitt	New York State Assembly; Delaware County; 1919–1923	Succeeded by Ralph H. Loomis
