= Henry O. Kahan =

American lawyer and politician

Henry Oscar Kahan (August 26, 1891 – February 6, 1932) was a Jewish-American lawyer and politician from New York.

== Life ==
Kahan was born on August 26, 1891, in New York City, New York. He attended DeWitt Clinton High School.

Kahan began attending New York Law School in 1910, graduating from there in 1913. He was admitted to the bar a year later and had a law office on 280 Broadway. He later had a law office on 295 Madison Avenue.

In April 1918, during World War I, he was inducted into military service at Camp Upton. Six weeks later, he was transferred to the Coast Artillery Corps as a sergeant. He was honorably discharged in December 1918.

In 1921, Kahan was elected to the New York State Assembly as a Democrat, representing the New York County 8th District. He served in the Assembly in 1922, 1923, 1924, 1925, 1926, 1927, 1928, 1929, 1930, 1931, and 1932.

Kahan's wife's name was Dawley. He was a member of the Freemasons and the Knights of Pythias.

Kahan died in Beth Israel Hospital on February 6, 1932. He was buried in Mount Carmel Cemetery.

New York State Assembly
Preceded by Morris D. Reiss	New York State Assembly; New York County, 8th District; 1922–1932	Succeeded by Joseph Hamerman
