= Edward J. Walsh (politician) =

American lawyer, politician, and magistrate (1890–1934)

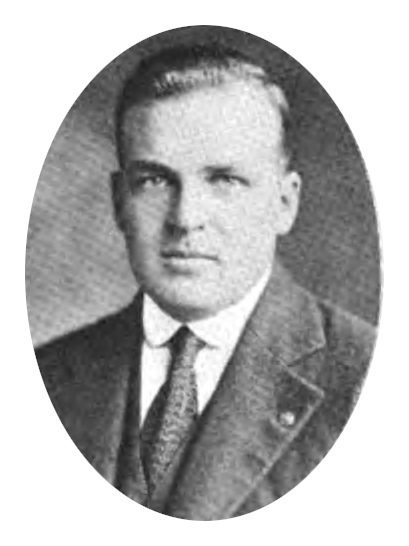
Edward J. Walsh

Edward J. Walsh (April 25, 1890 – October 14, 1934) was an American lawyer, politician, and magistrate from New York.

== Life ==
Walsh was born on April 25, 1890 in Harlem, New York, the son of Michael Walsh.

Walsh graduated from public school in the Bronx in 1904, after which he went to Fordham Preparatory School. He went to Fordham University in 1908 and graduated from there with a B.A. in 1912. He then received a law degree from Fordham Law School three years later. He was a noted athlete in college, serving as captain and star quarter-miler of the track squad and fullback on the football team. His gridiron coach was future New York Supreme Court Justice Edward J. Glennon. He taught at Fordham Preparatory School at one point. He was admitted to the bar in 1916, at which point he became a clerk.

In May 1917, during World War I, Walsh enlisted in the United States Naval Reserve as a seaman. In September 1917, he was called into active service. In March 1918, he was commissioned and served in the Naval Overseas Transportation Service, first as an ensign and later as a lieutenant. He was released from military service in June 1919. Shortly afterwards, he was appointed assistant counsel to the New York Public Service Commission, first district. He served in the position until 1920.

In 1920, Walsh was elected to the New York State Assembly as a Democrat, representing the Bronx County 8th District. He served in the Assembly in 1921, 1922, and 1923. In 1923, he was elected Alderman for the Bronx 30th District. He served as Alderman for six years. In March 1929, when Mayor Jimmy Walker went to Albany to appear before the State Legislature while Alderman President Joseph V. McKee and Alderman Vice-Chairman Charles A. McManus were both in Florida, he was acting Chair of the Board and served as acting Mayor of New York City for two days. In April 1929, Mayor Walker appointed him a City Magistrate to fill a vacancy caused by the death of August W. Glatzmayer. His term as Magistrate expired in June 1934, when he was replaced by Representative Frank Oliver. Later that year, he became the Democratic candidate for Municipal Court Justice in the Bronx 2nd District, although he died before the election.

Walsh was a member of the Elks, the Knights of Columbus, the Royal Arcanum, the American Legion, the Veterans of Foreign Wars, and the Bronx County Bar Association. His wife's name was Marie, and their children were Edward J., Eileen, Marie, and Ann. His brother Rev. Lawrence A. Walsh was dean of the Fordham University Graduate School.

Walsh died in the Webb Sanitarium from a kidney disorder on October 14, 1934. He was buried in Gate of Heaven Cemetery in Pleasantville.

New York State Assembly
Preceded by J. Fairfax McLaughlin	New York State Assembly; Bronx County, 8th District; 1921-1923	Succeeded by Joseph E. Kinsley
