= William T. Simpson =

American lawyer & politician (1886–1980)

William Thorn Simpson (August 1886 – December 8, 1980) was an American lawyer and politician from New York.

== Life ==
Simpson was born in Patchogue, New York, and graduated from Patchogue High School and New York Law School. He was married to Helen V. Simpson.

He was a member of the New York State Assembly (Kings Co., 12th D.) in 1914, 1915, 1916 and 1917.

Simpson was again a member of the State Assembly in 1920; and a member of the New York State Senate (6th D.) in 1921 and 1922.

In June 1942, he was appointed as Chairman of the New York State War Ballot Commission.

He died on December 8, 1980, at the St. James Nursing Home in St. James, New York; and was buried at the Cedar Grove Cemetery in Patchogue.

== Sources ==
- New York Red Book (1917; pg. 190)
- GUIDE FOR VOTERS BY CITIZENS UNION in NYT on October 28, 1917
- HEADS WAR BALLOT AGENCY in NYT on June 13, 1942 (subscription required)
- William T. Simpson, 94, Is Dead in NYT on December 11, 1980 (subscription required)

New York State Assembly
Preceded by William Pinkey Hamilton, Jr.	New York State Assembly; Kings County, 12th District; 1914–1917	Succeeded by Albert Link
Preceded by Albert Link	New York State Assembly; Kings County, 12th District; 1920	Succeeded by James G. Moore
New York State Senate
Preceded by Loring M. Black, Jr.	New York State Senate; 6th District; 1921–1922	Succeeded by James A. Higgins
