= James Male =

American politician (1895–1947)

James Male (December 13, 1895 – January 15, 1947) was an American politician, lawyer, and judge. A Democrat, he served three terms in the New York State Assembly.

== Early life ==
Male was born on December 13, 1895, in New York City, the son of Fannie Male and Max Male. He graduated from Townsend Harris High School. He then graduated from City College of New York and Fordham University, earning an LL.B. from the latter.

== Career ==
Male began his active law practice in New York City. In 1921, Male was elected to the New York State Assembly as a Democrat, representing the New York County 19th District. He served in the Assembly in 1922, 1923, and 1924. He lost the 1924 re-election to Republican Abraham Grenthal.

Male then worked as assistant district attorney for New York County and assistant corporation counsel for New York City. He later moved to Pelham Manor, where he worked in the real estate business and served as town justice in 1936. He continued his private law practice in New York City, moving it to Pelham in 1939.

Male was a member of the New York County Lawyers Association.

== Personal life ==
In 1921, Male married Dorothy Marton of New York City. They had three children: Morton, Herbert, and Selma.

Male was a member of the Improved Order of Red Men. He belonged to the Free Synagogue in Mount Vernon, New York.

Male died on January 15, 1947, from a myocardial infraction, while vacationing in Havana, Cuba. He was buried in Ferncliff Cemetery, in Westchester County, New York.

New York State Assembly
Preceded by Marguerite L. Smith	New York State Assembly; New York County, 19th District; 1922–1924	Succeeded by Abraham Grenthal
