= Frank R. Galgano =

American politician

Frank R. Galgano (May 14, 1887 – October 24, 1942) was an American lawyer and politician from New York.

== Life ==
Galgano was born on May 14, 1887 in New York City, New York. He was born and raised on the Lower East Side Fourth Ward, where future Governor Al Smith lived for many years.

Galgano attended DeWitt Clinton High School and the New York Law School. He initially worked as a law clerk in the office of former Lieutenant Governor Lewis Stuyvesant Chanler. He later became a member of the law firm Kramer, Bourke & Galgano, with offices at 220 Broadway.

In 1920, Galgano was elected to the New York State Assembly as a Democrat, representing the New York County 2nd District. He served in the Assembly in 1921, 1922, 1923, 1924, 1925, 1926, 1927, 1928, and 1929. At one point, he was the acting majority leader of the Assembly.

Galgano's wife was Louise, and their daughter was Viola.

Galgano died at his home in Long Beach on October 24, 1942. He was buried in Calvary Cemetery.

New York State Assembly
Preceded by Caesar B. F. Barra	New York State Assembly; New York County, 2nd District; 1921–1929	Succeeded by Millard E. Theodore
