= Arthur F. Bouton =

American politician

Arthur Frisbee Bouton (July 1, 1872 in Roxbury, Delaware County, New York – May 23, 1952 in Roxbury, Delaware Co., NY) was an American lawyer and politician from New York.

== Life ==
He was the son of Burritt Beebe Bouton (1847–1891) and Elizabeth K. (Frisbee) Bouton (1849–1931). He married Lulu C. Craft (1870–1946).

Bouton was a member of the New York State Senate (29th D.) from 1923 to 1926, sitting in the 146th, 147th, 148th and 149th New York State Legislatures.

He was a delegate to the New York State Constitutional Convention of 1938.

He died on May 23, 1952, in Roxbury, New York; and was buried at the More Cemetery in Grand Gorge.

New York State Senate
Preceded by Charles W. Walton	New York State Senate; 29th District; 1923–1926	Succeeded by Arthur H. Wicks
