= Nelson Ruttenberg =

American politician

Nelson Ruttenberg (April 11, 1893 – September 12, 1959) was a Jewish-American lawyer and politician from New York. He served in the New York State Assembly.

== Early life ==
Ruttenberg was born on April 11, 1893, in Elmira, New York, the son of Benjamin Ruttenberg and Sadie Kurzman.

Ruttenberg attended public school in New York City and graduated from DeWitt Clinton High School. In 1915, he graduated from the New York University School of Law and was admitted to the bar. During World War I, he was a sergeant in the 152nd Depot Brigade in Camp Upton.

== Career ==
In 1923, he formed a partnership with his brother Norbert under the firm name Ruttenberg & Ruttenberg.

In 1923, Ruttenberg was elected to the New York State Assembly as a Democrat, representing the New York County 23rd District. He served in the Assembly in 1924. He was Fourth Deputy Police Commissioner from 1927 to 1933, during which time he presided at the disciplinary trials of policemen involved in the Seabury investigations. He resigned from the position in 1933, when he became consul to the State Alcoholic Beverage Control Board. He held that position until 1937, when he retired due to poor health.

== Personal life ==
In 1927, he married Rhea Hornung. They had a son, David A. Ruttenberg.

Ruttenberg was president of the Jewish National Fund from 1931 to 1933 an administrative committee member of the Zionist Organization of America, Special Deputy Grand Master of the Independent Order Free Sons of Israel, and the organizer of the Young Folks' Democratic League. He was a member of the Elks, the Improved Order of Red Men, the American Legion, the New York County Lawyers' Association, the New York City Bar Association, the Tammany Society, and the Shomrim Society. He was also vice-president of the YMHA of Washington Heights. By the time he died, he was treasurer of the Park Avenue Synagogue.

Ruttenberg died from a heart attack while leaving home on September 12, 1959. He was buried in Mount Carmel Cemetery.

New York State Assembly
| Preceded by George N. Jesse | New York State Assembly; New York County, 23rd District; 1924 | Succeeded by A. Spencer Feld |
