= George J. Moore =

Canadian-American lawyer and politician

George Joseph Moore (May 19, 1879 – October 15, 1949) was a Canadian-American lawyer and politician from New York.

== Life ==
Moore was born on May 19, 1879, in Saint-Anicet, Quebec, Canada, the son of Arthur Moore and Elizabeth McCaffrey.

Moore attended the district schools in his native Huntington County. He graduated from Fort Covington High School in New York in 1898. After spending a year in the Potsdam Normal School, he taught school in Duane Center and Bellmont, New York. He then entered Albany Law School, graduating from there with an LL.B. in 1902. He spent two years in a private practice in Malone, after which he practiced law with Benjamin L. Wells under the firm name Wells & Moore. After Wells died in 1907, Moore practiced with Harold G. O'Neil, although in 1908 he established a private practice. He was senior member of the firm Moore, Herron & Lawler for around 12 years, and three years before his death he formed a partnership with his son Robert. At one point, he was associated with Lieutenant Governor M. William Bray, who was a clerk in Moore's law office. He was also a member of the Malone Board of Education, a director of the Alice Hyde Hospital, and vice-president and director of the Farmers National Bank of Malone.

Moore was on the Republican County Committee of Franklin County and counsel for the Board of Supervisors for several years. In 1923, he was elected to the New York State Assembly as a Republican, representing Franklin County. He served in the Assembly in 1924 and 1925. He was on the New York Republican State Committee and served as a delegate to the 1938 New York State Constitutional Convention.

A devout member of St. Joseph's Parish, Moore received an audience with the Pope in 1930. In 1938, he was made a Knight Commander of the Pontifical Order of St. Sylvester and invested with the insignia by Bishop Joseph Henry Conroy. He was a charter member and second Grand Knight of the local Knights of Columbus council, a charter member and second exalted ruler of the local Elks lodge, and a charter member and second president of the local Rotary Club. He was a member of the State Bankers Association, the Grange, the New York State Bar Association, and the American Bar Association. He was also president of the Franklin County Bar Association. In 1907, he married Theresa McNierny. Their children were Arthur, Albert, Robert, Marion, and Jean.

Moore died in the Alice Hyde Hospital in Malone on October 15, 1949. He was buried in St. Joseph's Cemetery on Lake Titus Road in Malone.

New York State Assembly
Preceded by Anson H. Ellsworth	New York State Assembly; Franklin County; 1924–1925	Succeeded by John E. Redwood
