= Irving F. Rice =

American politician

Irving F. Rice (October 17, 1867 – March 8, 1936) was an American farmer and politician from New York.

== Life ==
Rice was born on October 17, 1867, in Truxton, New York. His great-grandfather, Moses Rice, was one of the first settlers in Cortland County.

Rice initially worked as a mechanic in Cortland. After two years of poor health, he decided to live in the country instead. In around 1896, he bought a 16-acre farm a mile and a half away from Cortland and began raising poultry. He became known as one of the most successful single-comb white leghorn breeders in the country and an expert on poultry issues. He frequently served as a judge for prominent poultry shows, including the Madison Square Garden Poultry Show and the New York State Fair. He was one of two New York men to be in the Jury of Awards at the Panama–Pacific International Exposition. He was also a lecturer for the Farmers' Institute, president of the Farm Bureau's Organization, and a Master in his local and county Grange.

In 1918, Rice was elected to the New York State Assembly as a Republican, representing Cortland County. He served in the Assembly in 1919, 1920, 1921, 1922, 1923, 1924, 1925, 1926, 1927, 1928, 1929, 1930, 1931, 1932, and 1933.

Rice died at home on March 8, 1936. He was buried in Cortland Rural Cemetery.

New York State Assembly
Preceded by George H. Wiltsie	New York State Assembly; Cortland County; 1919–1933	Succeeded by Albert Haskell, Jr.
