= Parton Swift =

American lawyer and politician (1876-1952)

Parton Swift (July 14, 1876 in Cuba, Allegany County, New York – April 17, 1952 in Buffalo, Erie County, New York) was an American lawyer and politician from New York.

== Life ==
He was the son of Capt. Harlan J. Swift (born 1843) and Martha A. (Higgins) Swift (died 1891). Harlan J. Swift was Judge of Allegany County in 1882, and removed with his family to Buffalo in 1883. Parton Swift graduated Ph.B. from Cornell University in 1898. Then he studied law in his father's office, was admitted to the bar in 1900, and practiced law in Buffalo. On January 14, 1908, he married Nanette Paschall, and they had four sons. During World War I he fought as a first lieutenant of the field artillery. Nanette was the sister of Nathaniel Paschall who was the first husband of Bertha Cranston Potter whose second husband was William Boeing

Swift was elected on February 3, 1920, to the New York State Senate (48th D.) to fill the vacancy in the 143rd New York State Legislature caused by the resignation of Ross Graves. Swift was re-elected twice, and was a member of the State Senate until 1924, sitting in the 144th, 145th, 146th and 147th New York State Legislatures. He was Permanent Chairman of the Republican state convention in April 1924.

He was a justice of the New York Supreme Court from 1934 to 1946 when he reached the constitutional age limit. He was an Official Referee (i.e. a senior judge, up to the age of 75, on an additional seat) of the Supreme Court from 1947 to 1950.

He died on April 17, 1952, in Veterans Hospital in Buffalo, New York, of a heart ailment; and was buried at the Forest Lawn Cemetery there.

== Sources ==
- Bio of Harlan J. Swift transcribed from Our County and Its People: a Descriptive Work on Erie County, New York by Truman C. White (1898)
- Elect Republican State Senator in NYT on February 4, 1920
- New York Red Book (1922; pg. 82)
- STATE REPUBLICANS COMMEND COOLIDGE AND ATTACK SMITH in NYT on April 17, 1924 (subscription required)
- JUDGE PARTON SWIFT, STATE EX-OFFICIAL, 75 in NYT on April 18, 1952 (subscription required)
- Parton Swift, a Native of Cuba, Dies in Buffalo in The Patriot and Free Press, of Cuba, New York, on April 24, 1952

New York State Senate
Preceded by Ross Graves	New York State Senate; 48th District; 1920–1924	Succeeded by William J. Hickey
