= Frank S. Hall (New York politician) =

American politician

Frank Stuart Hall (August 17, 1853 – September 5, 1928) was an American farmer and politician from New York.

== Life ==
Hall was born on August 17, 1853, in Lima, New York, the son of fruit-grower and postmaster James Henry Hall and Jane Fitch Clark. His great-grandfather was General Amos Hall, a veteran of the American Revolutionary War and the War of 1812 who served as United States Marshal and in the New York State Assembly and New York State Senate.

Hall moved to Livingston County with his parents when he was two. He attended the district schools and a West Bloomfield school. After his father died in 1864, he helped support his mother and younger brother F. C. Hall. He went to the Genesee Wesleyan Seminary in Lima for three winters. In the summer of 1879, he clerked in his brother's store in Hornell. In the fall of that year, he moved to Webster County, Nebraska, and worked in the sheep raising business. He moved back to New York in 1888 due to his mother's poor health, living with her in West Bloomfield. A year later, he moved to Lewiston with his family and worked in the farming and fruit business.

Hall served as town assessor for fourteen consecutive years. In 1921, he was elected to the New York State Assembly as a Republican, representing the Niagara County 2nd District. He served in the Assembly in 1922, 1923, 1924, 1925, 1926, 1927, and 1928. He was a member of the Buffalo and Niagara Frontier port authority survey commission until it was abolished in 1927.

Hall was a member of the State Grange. He was senior elder of the Presbyterian Church in Lewiston. In 1884, he married Adelaide E. Magee of Nebraska. They adopted Adelaide's niece, Helen Magee Hall.

Hall died at home on September 5, 1928. He was seeking renomination to the Assembly when he died. He was buried in West Bloomfield.

New York State Assembly
Preceded by Nicholas V. V. Franchot II	New York State Assembly; Niagara County, 2nd District; 1922–1928	Succeeded by Roy Hewitt
