= William Wickham (New York politician) =

Farmer from New York (state)

William Wickham (August 11, 1871 – November 29, 1959) was an American farmer, businessman, and politician from New York.

== Life ==
Wickham was born on August 11, 1871, in Hector, New York, the son of Charles E. Wickham and Amelia Keep.

After attending public school, Wickham took a commercial course in Warner Business College in Elmira. He then returned home and worked as a farmer, leasing 151 acres from his father. Seven years later, he turned to merchandising and opened a store in 1899. In 1903, he was appointed postmaster of Hector. He was also manager of the New York & Pennsylvania Telephone office in Hector and president of the company that owned the local line between Hector and Logan. He later operated a large fruit, grain, and dairy farm in Hector.

In 1923, Wickham was elected to the New York State Assembly as a Republican, representing Schuyler County. He served in the Assembly in 1924 and 1925.

Wickham was a member of the Burdett Schuyler County Farm Bureau and the Freemasons. In 1892, he married Nellie Donnelly of Hector. Their son Don Wickham was the New York State Agriculture Commissioner.

Wickham moved to St. Petersburg, Florida, in 1952. He died at his home there on November 29, 1959. He was buried in the Hector Presbyterian Church Cemetery.

New York State Assembly
Preceded by John W. Gurnett Jr.	New York State Assembly; Schuyler County; 1924–1925	Succeeded by Jacob W. Winters
