= Thomas Channing Moore =

American businessman and politician

Thomas Channing Moore (June 1, 1872 – November 18, 1931) was an American businessman and politician from New York.

== Life ==
Moore was born on June 1, 1872, in Syracuse, New York, the son of Thomas William Channing Moore and Jeanie Harriet Clarke. His father fought in the American Civil War as a lieutenant-colonel and as aide-de-camp to General Philip Sheridan. His great-grandparents included Richard C. Moore, the Bishop of Virginia from 1814 to 1841, and Francis E. Spinner, the United States Treasurer from 1861 to 1875.

In 1874, Moore moved with his family to Florida. He graduated from the University of the South in Sewanee, Tennessee, in 1890, later becoming a trustee of the university. In 1899, he began working for the International Time Recording Company of New York. He worked as a New York City sales agent for the company for decades. He lived in Bronxville, where he was chairman of the Bronxville planning commission from 1914 to at least 1925. He became a member of the Republican County Committee in 1914. In 1916, he was elected village president of Bronxville, an office he held for three consecutive years.

In 1919, Moore was elected to the New York State Assembly as a Republican, representing the Westchester County 1st District. He served in the Assembly in 1920, 1921, 1922, 1923, 1924, 1925, 1926, and 1929. While in the Assembly, he was on the Legislation Commission to codify laws related to children. He also sponsored a referendum bill for a new charter for Westchester County, introduced a bill that curbed child marriages, sponsored a bill advocating the use of public schools as polling places, and furthered legislation for the protection of wild flowers. He remained involved with the renamed International Business Machine Corporation, serving as its New York manager. He was also an opponent of the death penalty in the Assembly, once proposing a bill to eliminate it.

Moore was a Master and Deputy District Grand Master of the Freemasons. He was a member of Phi Delta Theta, the Society of Colonial Wars, the Sons of the Revolution, the St. Nicholas Society, the Military Order of the Loyal Legion, the Union League Club, and the Adirondack Mountain Club. He was an Episcopalian and was a vestryman of Christ Church. In 1907, he married Bertha Douglas Stone. Their children were Richard Channing, David, and Jean Douglas. Jean’s son, Garry Trudeau, is a cartoonist.

Moore died at home from heart disease on November 18, 1931. He was buried in the family plot in Mohawk.

New York State Assembly
Preceded by Bertrand G. Burtnett	New York State Assembly; Westchester County, 1st District; 1920–1926	Succeeded by William C. Olsen
Preceded by William C. Olsen	New York State Assembly; Westchester County, 1st District; 1929	Succeeded by Charles H. Hathaway
