= Marguerite L. Smith =

American politician

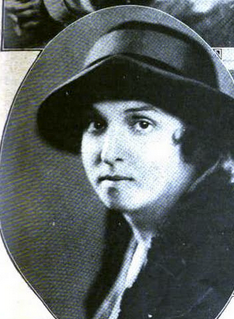
- Marguerite L. Smith, from a 1920 publication
- Born: Marguerite L. Smith; September 27, 1894
- Died: September 1985 (aged 90–91)
- Occupation: Politician
- Spouse: Anthony Conrad Eiser

Marguerite L. Eiser (née Smith; September 27, 1894 – September 1985) was an American politician from New York.

== Early life and education ==
She was the daughter of J. Gardner Smith (died 1931), who was President of the Harlem Board of Commerce. She graduated from New York Collegiate Institute in 1912. Then she attended Teachers College, and there was captain of the basketball team, catcher of the baseball team, and President of the Athletic Association. She then became an athletics teacher at Horace Mann School. She lived at 21 West 122nd Street in Manhattan.

== Career ==
In September 1919, Smith ran in the Republican primary election for the New York State Assembly in New York County's 19th District, and defeated the Reverend R. M. Bolden, an African-American minister. At the election in November 1919, she defeated the incumbent Democratic assemblyman Martin J. Healy, and sat in the 143rd New York State Legislature in 1920. On the last day of the regular session, she occupied for about half an hour the Speaker's chair, being the first woman to preside over the Assembly. She was re-elected in November 1920 to the 144th New York State Legislature, and was Chairwoman of the Committee on Social Welfare. She was the first woman to serve a second term in the Assembly; and the first woman to chair a standing committee of the Assembly. In November 1921, she ran again for re-election, but was defeated by Democrat James Male who had been endorsed by the Citizens Union. She had also incurred the wrath of the President of the Women's Trade Union League Rose Schneiderman who said that Smith was "a machine politician, and an enemy to working women."

== Personal life ==
In 1931, she married Anthony Conrad Eiser.

She died in September 1985 in Thetford Center, Orange County, Vermont.

New York State Assembly
Preceded by Martin J. Healy	New York State Assembly; New York County, 19th District; 1920–1921	Succeeded by James Male
