= 143rd New York State Legislature =

New York state legislative session

| ← | 142nd | 144th | → |
- New York State Capitol (2009)

Overview
- Legislative body: New York State Legislature
- Jurisdiction: New York, United States
- Term: January 1 – December 31, 1920

Senate
- Members: 51
- President: Lt. Gov. Harry C. Walker (D)
- Temporary President: J. Henry Walters (R)
- Party control: Republican (30–21)

Assembly
- Members: 150
- Speaker: Thaddeus C. Sweet (R)
- Party control: Republican (110–35–5)

Sessions
- 1st: January 7 – April 25, 1920
- 2nd: September 20 – 24?, 1920

The 143rd New York State Legislature, consisting of the New York State Senate and the New York State Assembly, met from January 7 to September 1920, during the second year of Al Smith's governorship, in Albany.

== Background ==
Under the provisions of the New York Constitution of 1894, re-apportioned in 1917, 51 Senators and 150 assemblymen were elected in single-seat districts; senators for a two-year term, assemblymen for a one-year term. The senatorial districts consisted either of one or more entire counties; or a contiguous area within a single county. The counties which were divided into more than one senatorial district were New York (nine districts), Kings (eight), Bronx (three), Erie (three), Monroe (two), Queens (two) and Westchester (two). The Assembly districts were made up of contiguous area, all within the same county.

At this time there were two major political parties: the Republican Party and the Democratic Party. The Socialist Party also nominated tickets.

== Elections ==
The 1919 New York state election was held on November 4. No statewide elective offices were up for election. Two women were elected to the State Assembly: Elizabeth V. Gillette (Dem.), a physician, of Schenectady; and Marguerite L. Smith (Rep.), an athletics teacher, of Harlem.

== Sessions ==
The Legislature met for the regular session at the State Capitol in Albany on January 7, 1920. Thaddeus C. Sweet (R) was re-elected Speaker.

At the beginning of the session, the five Socialist assemblymen were suspended by Speaker Sweet, pending a trial before the Assembly Committee on the Judiciary to determine whether they were fit to take their seats. Charles Evans Hughes (Rep.) and Governor Al Smith (Dem.) condemned Speaker Sweet and the Republican majority for taking this course of action.

On March 30, a majority of 7 members of the 13-member Judiciary Committee recommended the expulsion the five Socialists. Minority reports recommended the seating of all or part of the Socialist assemblymen.

In the early morning of April 1, the five Socialist assemblymen were expelled.

The Legislature adjourned at 2 a.m. on Sunday morning, April 25, after a session of 37 hours. During this last session, Marguerite L. Smith occupied for about half an hour the Speaker's chair.

On August 12, Gov. Al Smith called a special session of the Legislature for September 20, and ordered special elections to be held on September 16 to fill the vacancies caused by the expulsion of the Socialist members. The session was called to consider the housing situation in New York City.

On September 16, all five Socialists were re-elected to the Assembly.

The Legislature met for a special session at the State Capitol in Albany on September 20, 1920.

On September 21, Claessens, Solomon and Waldman were again expelled, while DeWitt and Orr were permitted by a majority vote to take their seats. However, DeWitt and Orr resigned their seats in protest against the ouster of their three comrades.

== State Senate ==
=== Districts ===
- 1st District: Nassau and Suffolk counties
- 2nd and 3rd District: Parts of Queens County, i.e the Borough of Queens
- 4th, 5th, 6th, 7th, 8th, 9th, 10th and 11th District: Parts of Kings County, i.e. the Borough of Brooklyn
- 12th, 13th, 14th, 15th, 16th, 17th, 18th, 19th and 20th District: Parts of New York County, i.e. the Borough of Manhattan
- 21st, 22nd and 23rd District: Parts of Bronx County, i.e. the Borough of the Bronx
- 24th District: Richmond County, i.e. the Borough of Richmond (now the Borough of Staten Island), and Rockland County
- 25th District: Part of Westchester County
- 26th District: Cortlandt, Greenburgh, Mount Pleasant, Ossining and part of Yonkers; in Westchester County
- 27th District: Orange and Sullivan counties
- 28th District: Columbia, Dutchess and Putnam counties
- 29th District: Delaware, Greene and Ulster counties
- 30th District: Albany County
- 31st District: Rensselaer County
- 32nd District: Saratoga and Schenectady counties
- 33rd District: Clinton, Essex, Warren and Washington counties
- 34th District: Franklin and St. Lawrence counties
- 35th District: Fulton, Hamilton, Herkimer and Lewis counties
- 36th District: Oneida County
- 37th District: Jefferson and Oswego counties
- 38th District: Onondaga County
- 39th District: Madison, Montgomery, Otsego and Schoharie counties
- 40th District: Broome, Chenango and Cortland counties
- 41st District: Chemung, Schuyler, Tioga and Tompkins counties
- 42nd District: Cayuga, Seneca and Wayne counties
- 43rd District: Ontario, Steuben and Yates counties
- 44th District: Allegany, Genesee, Livingston and Wyoming
- 45th and 46th District: Monroe County
- 47th District: Niagara and Orleans counties
- 48th, 49th and 50th District: Erie County
- 51st District: Cattaraugus and Chautauqua counties

=== Members ===
The asterisk (*) denotes members of the previous Legislature who continued in office as members of this Legislature.

| District | Senator | Party | Notes |
|---|---|---|---|
| 1st | George L. Thompson* | Republican | |
| 2nd | John L. Karle | Republican | elected to fill vacancy, in place of Frank F. Adel |
| 3rd | Peter J. McGarry* | Democrat | |
| 4th | Kenneth F. Sutherland* | Democrat | |
| 5th | Daniel F. Farrell* | Democrat | |
| 6th | Loring M. Black Jr.* | Democrat | |
| 7th | Charles C. Lockwood* | Republican | |
| 8th | Alvah W. Burlingame Jr.* | Republican | |
| 9th | Charles E. Russell* | Democrat | |
| 10th | Jeremiah F. Twomey* | Democrat | |
| 11th | Daniel J. Carroll* | Democrat | |
| 12th | Jimmy Walker* | Democrat | Minority Leader |
| 13th | John J. Boylan* | Democrat | |
| 14th | Bernard Downing* | Democrat | |
| 15th | Abraham Kaplan* | Democrat | |
| 16th | Joseph D. Kelly | Democrat | elected to fill vacancy, in place of James A. Foley |
| 17th | Julius Miller* | Democrat | |
| 18th | Salvatore A. Cotillo* | Democrat | |
| 19th | Edward J. Dowling* | Democrat | |
| 20th | William C. Dodge* | Democrat | |
| 21st | Henry G. Schackno* | Democrat | |
| 22nd | Peter A. Abeles* | Republican | |
| 23rd | John J. Dunnigan* | Democrat | |
| 24th | John A. Lynch* | Democrat | |
| 25th | George T. Burling* | Republican | |
| 26th | Walter W. Law Jr.* | Republican | |
| 27th | Caleb H. Baumes* | Republican | |
| 28th | James E. Towner* | Republican | |
| 29th | Charles W. Walton* | Republican | |
| 30th | Henry M. Sage* | Republican | |
| 31st | John J. Mackrell* | Democrat | |
| 32nd | James W. Yelverton* | Republican | |
| 33rd | Mortimer Y. Ferris* | Republican | |
| 34th | N. Monroe Marshall* | Republican | on November 2, 1920, elected New York State Treasurer |
| 35th | Burt Z. Kasson* | Republican | |
| 36th | Frederick M. Davenport* | Republican | |
| 37th | Fred B. Pitcher* | Republican | |
| 38th | J. Henry Walters* | Republican | President pro tempore |
| 39th | Adon P. Brown* | Republican | Chairman of Agriculture |
| 40th | Clayton R. Lusk* | Republican | |
| 41st | Seymour Lowman* | Republican | |
| 42nd | Charles J. Hewitt* | Republican | |
| 43rd | William A. Carson* | Republican | |
| 44th | John Knight* | Republican | |
| 45th | James L. Whitley* | Republican | |
| 46th | John B. Mullan* | Republican | |
| 47th | George F. Thompson* | Republican | |
| 48th | vacant | | Ross Graves resigned on December 27, 1919 |
| 48th | Parton Swift | Republican | elected to fill vacancy on February 3, 1920 |
| 49th | Samuel J. Ramsperger* | Democrat | |
| 50th | Leonard W. H. Gibbs* | Republican | |
| 51st | J. Samuel Fowler* | Republican | |

=== Employees ===
- Clerk: Ernest A. Fay
- Sergeant-at-Arms:
- Assistant Sergeant-at-Arms:
- Principal Doorkeeper:
- First Assistant Doorkeeper:
- Stenographer:

== State Assembly ==
Note: For brevity, the chairmanships omit the words "...the Committee on (the)..."

=== Assemblymen ===
| District | | Assemblymen | Party | Notes |
|---|---|---|---|---|
| Albany | 1st | Edgar C. Campbell | Republican | |
| Albany | 2nd | Charles F. Moss | Republican | |
| Albany | 3rd | Frank L. Wiswall | Republican | |
| Allegany | | William Duke Jr.* | Republican | |
| Bronx | 1st | Albert H. Henderson | Democrat | |
| Bronx | 2nd | Edward J. Flynn* | Democrat | |
| Bronx | 3rd | (Samuel A. DeWitt) | Socialist | suspended on January 7; expelled on April 1; elected to fill vacancy on September 16, resigned on September 21 |
| Bronx | 4th | (Samuel Orr) | Socialist | suspended on January 7; expelled on April 1; elected to fill vacancy on September 16, resigned on September 21 |
| Bronx | 5th | William S. Evans* | Democrat | |
| Bronx | 6th | Thomas J. McDonald* | Democrat | |
| Bronx | 7th | Joseph V. McKee* | Democrat | |
| Bronx | 8th | J. Fairfax McLaughlin* | Democrat | |
| Broome | 1st | Edmund B. Jenks* | Republican | |
| Broome | 2nd | Forman E. Whitcomb* | Republican | |
| Cattaraugus | | DeHart H. Ames* | Republican | |
| Cayuga | | L. Ford Hager* | Republican | |
| Chautauqua | 1st | Hermes L. Ames* | Republican | died on August 23, 1920 |
| Chautauqua | 2nd | Joseph A. McGinnies* | Republican | |
| Chemung | | John J. Richford* | Republican | |
| Chenango | | Bert Lord* | Republican | |
| Clinton | | Charles M. Harrington | Republican | |
| Columbia | | Ransom H. Gillett | Republican | |
| Cortland | | Irving F. Rice* | Republican | |
| Delaware | | Lincoln R. Long* | Republican | |
| Dutchess | 1st | J. Griswold Webb* | Republican | |
| Dutchess | 2nd | Frank L. Gardner* | Republican | |
| Erie | 1st | George E. D. Brady* | Republican | |
| Erie | 2nd | John W. Slacer* | Republican | |
| Erie | 3rd | August Seelbach | Republican | |
| Erie | 4th | Andrew T. Beasley* | Democrat | |
| Erie | 5th | Alexander A. Patrzykowski* | Democrat | |
| Erie | 6th | George H. Rowe* | Republican | |
| Erie | 7th | Herbert A. Zimmerman* | Republican | |
| Erie | 8th | Nelson W. Cheney* | Republican | |
| Essex | | Raymond T. Kenyon* | Republican | |
| Franklin | | Warren T. Thayer* | Republican | |
| Fulton and Hamilton | | Eberly Hutchinson* | Republican | |
| Genesee | | Charles P. Miller* | Republican | |
| Greene | | Frank G. Jacobs | Republican | |
| Herkimer | | Edward O. Davies* | Republican | |
| Jefferson | | H. Edmund Machold* | Republican | |
| Kings | 1st | John J. Griffith* | Democrat | |
| Kings | 2nd | James J. Mullen | Republican | |
| Kings | 3rd | Frank J. Taylor* | Democrat | |
| Kings | 4th | Peter A. McArdle* | Democrat | |
| Kings | 5th | James H. Caulfield Jr.* | Republican | Chairman of Commerce and Navigation |
| Kings | 6th | Harry Dimin | Republican | |
| Kings | 7th | John J. Kelly* | Democrat | |
| Kings | 8th | Michael J. Reilly | Democrat | |
| Kings | 9th | James T. Carroll | Republican | |
| Kings | 10th | Leo V. Doherty | Republican | |
| Kings | 11th | James F. Bly | Republican | |
| Kings | 12th | William T. Simpson | Republican | |
| Kings | 13th | George W. Lindsay | Democrat | |
| Kings | 14th | Joseph Lentol* | Democrat | |
| Kings | 15th | John J. McLoughlin | Democrat | |
| Kings | 16th | Harvey J. Ross | Republican | |
| Kings | 17th | Frederick A. Wells* | Republican | Chairman of Military Affairs |
| Kings | 18th | Theodore Stitt | Republican | |
| Kings | 19th | John Damico | Republican | |
| Kings | 20th | John O. Gempler | Republican | |
| Kings | 21st | Warren I. Lee | Republican | |
| Kings | 22nd | George U. Forbell | Republican | |
| Kings | 23rd | (Charles Solomon)* | Socialist | suspended on January 7; expelled on April 1; elected to fill vacancy on September 16, expelled on September 21 |
| Lewis | | Frederick S. Easton Jr. | Democrat | |
| Livingston | | George F. Wheelock* | Republican | |
| Madison | | Morell E. Tallett* | Republican | |
| Monroe | 1st | James A. Harris* | Republican | |
| Monroe | 2nd | Simon L. Adler* | Republican | Majority Leader |
| Monroe | 3rd | Harry B. Crowley* | Republican | |
| Monroe | 4th | Frank Dobson* | Republican | |
| Monroe | 5th | Franklin W. Judson* | Republican | |
| Montgomery | | Alton A. Walrath* | Republican | |
| Nassau | 1st | Thomas A. McWhinney* | Republican | |
| Nassau | 2nd | Theodore Roosevelt Jr. | Republican | |
| New York | 1st | Peter J. Hamill* | Democrat | |
| New York | 2nd | Caesar B. F. Barra* | Democrat | |
| New York | 3rd | Thomas F. Burchill | Democrat | |
| New York | 4th | Samuel Dickstein* | Democrat | |
| New York | 5th | Charles D. Donohue* | Democrat | Minority Leader |
| New York | 6th | Sol Ullman* | Republican | |
| New York | 7th | Noel B. Fox | Republican | |
| New York | 8th | (Louis Waldman) | Socialist | suspended on January 7; expelled on April 1; elected to fill vacancy on September 16, expelled on September 21 |
| New York | 9th | Martin Bourke | Republican | |
| New York | 10th | William W. Pellet* | Republican | |
| New York | 11th | William C. Amos* | Republican | |
| New York | 12th | Martin G. McCue* | Democrat | |
| New York | 13th | Robert B. Wallace | Republican | |
| New York | 14th | Edward Healey | Democrat | |
| New York | 15th | Joseph Steinberg* | Republican | |
| New York | 16th | Maurice Bloch* | Democrat | |
| New York | 17th | (August Claessens)* | Socialist | suspended on January 7; expelled on April 1; elected to fill vacancy on September 16, expelled on September 21 |
| New York | 18th | Owen M. Kiernan* | Democrat | |
| New York | 19th | Marguerite L. Smith | Republican | |
| New York | 20th | Louis A. Cuvillier | Democrat | |
| New York | 21st | John Clifford Hawkins* | Republican | |
| New York | 22nd | Oscar J. Smith | Republican | |
| New York | 23rd | George N. Jesse | Republican | |
| Niagara | 1st | David E. Jeffery | Republican | |
| Niagara | 2nd | Alan V. Parker | Republican | |
| Oneida | 1st | Hartwell W. Booth* | Republican | |
| Oneida | 2nd | Louis M. Martin* | Republican | Chairman of Judiciary |
| Oneida | 3rd | Chauncey J. Williams | Republican | |
| Onondaga | 1st | Manuel J. Soule* | Republican | |
| Onondaga | 2nd | Gardner J. Chamberlin* | Republican | |
| Onondaga | 3rd | George R. Fearon* | Republican | Chairman of Affairs of Cities |
| Ontario | | George M. Tyler* | Republican | |
| Orange | 1st | Arthur E. Brundage | Republican | |
| Orange | 2nd | Charles L. Mead* | Republican | |
| Orleans | | Frank H. Lattin* | Republican | |
| Oswego | | Thaddeus C. Sweet* | Republican | re-elected Speaker |
| Otsego | | Allen J. Bloomfield* | Republican | |
| Putnam | | John P. Donohoe* | Republican | |
| Queens | 1st | Peter A. Leininger* | Democrat | |
| Queens | 2nd | Bernard Schwab* | Democrat | |
| Queens | 3rd | Edward J. Neary | Republican | |
| Queens | 4th | Nicholas M. Pette | Republican | |
| Queens | 5th | Ralph Halpern | Republican | |
| Queens | 6th | Henry Baum | Republican | |
| Rensselaer | 1st | Hugh C. Morrissey | Republican | |
| Rensselaer | 2nd | Arthur Cowee* | Republican | |
| Richmond | 1st | Thomas F. Cosgrove | Democrat | |
| Richmond | 2nd | George P. Reynaud | Democrat | |
| Rockland | | Gordon H. Peck* | Republican | |
| St. Lawrence | 1st | Frank L. Seaker* | Republican | |
| St. Lawrence | 2nd | Edward A. Everett* | Republican | |
| Saratoga | | Clarence C. Smith* | Republican | |
| Schenectady | 1st | Harold E. Blodgett | Republican | |
| Schenectady | 2nd | Elizabeth V. Gillette | Democrat | |
| Schoharie | | Jared Van Wagenen Jr. | Democrat | |
| Schuyler | | Clarence W. Hausner | Republican | |
| Seneca | | George A. Dobson | Republican | |
| Steuben | 1st | Ernest E. Cole | Republican | |
| Steuben | 2nd | Delevan C. Hunter* | Republican | |
| Suffolk | 1st | John G. Downs* | Republican | |
| Suffolk | 2nd | William G. Carroll | Democrat | |
| Sullivan | | Guernsey T. Cross | Democrat | |
| Tioga | | Daniel P. Witter* | Republican | |
| Tompkins | | Casper Fenner* | Republican | |
| Ulster | | Simon B. Van Wagenen | Republican | |
| Warren | | Stewart MacFarland | Republican | |
| Washington | | Eugene R. Norton* | Republican | |
| Wayne | | Charles H. Betts | Republican | |
| Westchester | 1st | Thomas Channing Moore | Republican | |
| Westchester | 2nd | Walter W. Westall* | Republican | |
| Westchester | 3rd | Edward J. Wilson* | Republican | |
| Westchester | 4th | Mitchell A. Trahan Jr. | Republican | |
| Westchester | 5th | George Blakely* | Republican | |
| Wyoming | | Bert P. Gage* | Republican | |
| Yates | | James M. Lown* | Republican | |

=== Employees ===
- Clerk: Fred W. Hammond
- Deputy Clerk: Wilson Messer
- Sergeant-at-Arms: Harry W. Haines
- Principal Doorkeeper:
- First Assistant Doorkeeper:
- Second Assistant Doorkeeper:
- Stenographer: Edwin Van Cett
- Postmaster: James H. Underwood

== Sources ==
- New York Legislative Documents (143rd Session) (1920; Vol. I, No. 1 to 5)
- SENATE DEMOCRATS SPLIT OVER LEADER in NYT on January 7, 1920
- TWO CHAIRMANSHIPS FOR NEW YORK CITY in NYT on January 13, 1920
