= Eberly Hutchinson =

American politician

Eberly Hutchinson (November 3, 1871 – March 8, 1951) was an American civil engineer and politician from New York.

== Life ==
He was born on November 3, 1871, in Johnstown, Fulton County, New York, the son of S. G. Hutchinson and Katherine (Eberly) Hutchinson. He attended Ohio State University, enrolled in 1891 at Harvard College, and graduated A.B. in 1895. He also received an M.E. degree, and became a mining engineer, working in California and Mexico. Later he lived in Caroga, New York, near the Canada and Green lakes in Fulton County.

Hutchinson was a member of the New York State Assembly (Fulton & Hamilton Co.) in 1919, 1920, 1921, 1922, 1923, 1924, 1925, 1926, 1927, 1928, 1929, 1930 and 1931. He was Chairman of the Committee on Insurance from 1922 to 1924; and Chairman of the Committee on Ways and Means from 1925 to 1931.

He died on March 8, 1951, in Los Angeles, California, and was buried at the Johnstown Cemetery.

== Sources ==
New York State Assembly
| Preceded by Burt Z. Kasson | New York State Assembly; Fulton and Hamilton Counties; 1919–1931 | Succeeded by Harry F. Dunkel |
| Preceded by Joseph A. McGinnies | Chairman of the Committee on Ways and Means; 1925–1931 | Succeeded by Fred L. Porter |
