= Walter W. Westall =

American politician (1880–1968)

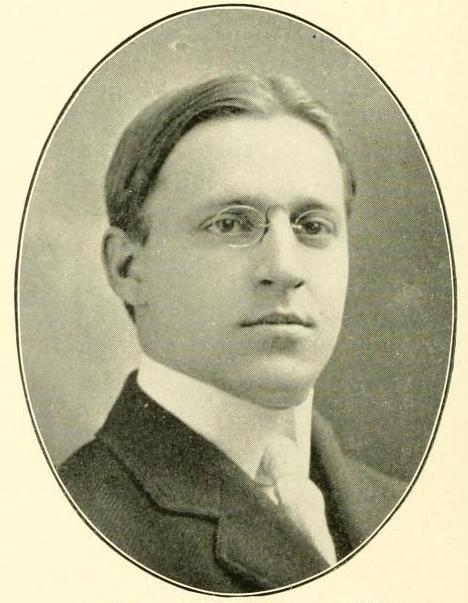
- Westall in 1903

Member of the New York State Senate from the 25th district
- In office January 1, 1923 – December 31, 1934
- Preceded by: George T. Burling
- Succeeded by: Pliny W. Williamson

Member of the New York State Assembly from the Westchester County 2nd district
- In office January 1, 1919 – December 31, 1922
- Preceded by: William J. Fallon
- Succeeded by: Herbert B. Shonk

Personal details
- Born: Walter Wilbert Westall; October 9, 1880 Cornwall, New York, U.S.
- Died: June 4, 1968 (aged 87)
- Party: Republican
- Spouse: Marion Edna (died 1966)
- Children: 1
- Education: Syracuse University
- Occupation: Politician, lawyer

Walter Wilbert Westall (October 9, 1880, in Cornwall, Orange County, New York – June 4, 1968) was an American lawyer and politician from New York.

== Life ==
He was the son of John Wendt Westall Jr. He attended Cornwall High School. He graduated from Syracuse University School of Law, and began the practice of law in Syracuse. Later he removed to White Plains, and practiced law in Westchester County and New York City. He married Marion Edna (died 1966), and they had one daughter.

Westall was a member of the New York State Assembly (Westchester Co., 2nd D.) in 1919, 1920, 1921 and 1922.

He was a member of the New York State Senate (25th D.) from 1923 to 1934, sitting in the 146th, 147th, 148th, 149th, 150th, 151st, 152nd, 153rd, 154th, 155th, 156th and 157th New York State Legislature.

He was Secretary of the Westchester County Republican Committee from 1945 until his death in 1968.

== Sources ==
- History of the Valley of the Hudson (Vol. 5; 1931; pg. 354)
- MRS. WALTER WESTALL in NYT on May 26, 1966 (subscription required)
- WALTER W. WESTALL, REPUBLICAN LEADER in NYT on June 6, 1968 (subscription required)

New York State Assembly
| Preceded by William J. Fallon | New York State Assembly; Westchester County, 2nd District; 1919–1922 | Succeeded by Herbert B. Shonk |
New York State Senate
| Preceded by George T. Burling | New York State Senate; 25th District; 1923–1934 | Succeeded by Pliny W. Williamson |
