= 142nd New York State Legislature =

New York state legislative session

←	141st	143rd	→
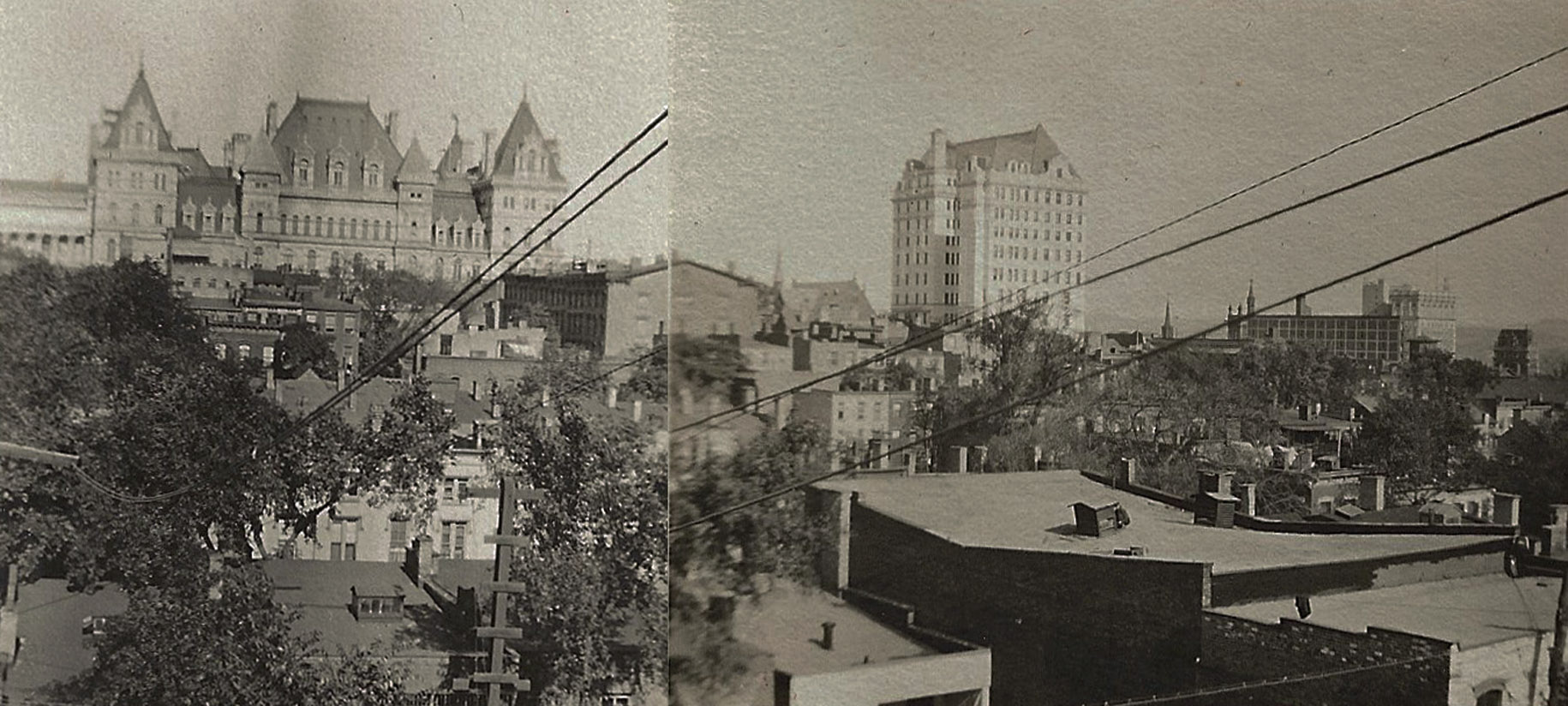
- New York State Capitol (1919)

Overview
- Legislative body: New York State Legislature
- Jurisdiction: New York, United States
- Term: January 1 – December 31, 1919

Senate
- Members: 51
- President: Lt. Gov. Harry C. Walker (D)
- Temporary President: J. Henry Walters (R)
- Party control: Republican (29–22)

Assembly
- Members: 150
- Speaker: Thaddeus C. Sweet (R)
- Party control: Republican (96–52–2)

Sessions
- 1st: January 1 – April 19, 1919
- 2nd: June 16, 1919 –

The 142nd New York State Legislature, consisting of the New York State Senate and the New York State Assembly, met from January 1 to June 16, 1919, during the first year of Al Smith's governorship, in Albany.

== Background ==
Under the provisions of the New York Constitution of 1894, re-apportioned in 1917, 51 Senators and 150 assemblymen were elected in single-seat districts; senators for a two-year term, assemblymen for a one-year term. The senatorial districts consisted either of one or more entire counties; or a contiguous area within a single county. The counties which were divided into more than one senatorial district were New York (nine districts), Kings (eight), Bronx (three), Erie (three), Monroe (two), Queens (two), and Westchester (two). The Assembly districts were made up of contiguous area, all within the same county.

At this time there were two major political parties: the Republican Party and the Democratic Party. The Socialist Party, the Prohibition Party and the Socialist Labor Party also nominated tickets.

== Elections ==
The 1918 New York state election, was held on November 5. This was the first election at which women had the right to vote, and the right to run for elective offices. Two women were elected to the State Assembly: Ida B. Sammis (Rep.) and Mary M. Lilly (Dem.).

Al Smith and Harry C. Walker were elected Governor and Lieutenant Governor, both Democrats. The incumbent Governor Charles S. Whitman ran on the Republican and the Prohibition tickets for re-election, but was defeated by Smith in a tight race, with a plurality of about 15,000 votes out of more than two million.

The other five statewide elective offices up for election were carried by the Republicans. The approximate party strength at this election, as expressed by the vote for Governor, was: Democrats 1,010,000; Republicans 956,000; Socialists 122,000; Prohibition 39,000; and Socialist Labor 5,000.

In New York City, where in November 1917 ten Socialists had been elected to the Assembly by pluralities in three-way races, Republicans and Democrats combined to stem the "red flood", and nominated joint candidates in most of the "Socialist" districts. Thus they managed to outpoll the Socialists in eight of the ten districts; only two Socialists, August Claessens and Charles Solomon, managed to get elected.

== Sessions ==
The Legislature met for the regular session at the State Capitol in Albany on January 1, 1919; and adjourned on April 19.

Thaddeus C. Sweet (R) was re-elected Speaker.

J. Henry Walters (R) was elected president pro tempore of the State Senate.

The Legislature met for a special session at the State Capitol in Albany in the evening of June 16. This session was called to ratify the Nineteenth Amendment to the United States Constitution which established women's suffrage. The amendment was ratified by a vote of 44 to 0 in the Senate, and 137 to 0 in the Assembly. State Senator Henry M. Sage—who was an outspoken opponent of women's suffrage–was, on his request, excused from voting because "he did not care to vote against it, but could not possibly vote to ratify." The Legislature also passed four bills concerning the housing situation in New York City; and adjourned after four hours.

== State Senate ==
=== Districts ===
- 1st District: Nassau and Suffolk counties
- 2nd and 3rd District: Parts of Queens County, i.e the Borough of Queens
- 4th, 5th, 6th, 7th, 8th, 9th, 10th and 11th District: Parts of Kings County, i.e. the Borough of Brooklyn
- 12th, 13th, 14th, 15th, 16th, 17th, 18th, 19th and 20th District: Parts of New York County, i.e. the Borough of Manhattan
- 21st, 22nd and 23rd District: Parts of Bronx County, i.e. the Borough of the Bronx
- 24th District: Richmond County, i.e. the Borough of Richmond (now the Borough of Staten Island), and Rockland County
- 25th District: Part of Westchester County
- 26th District: Cortlandt, Greenburgh, Mount Pleasant, Ossining and part of Yonkers; in Westchester County
- 27th District: Orange and Sullivan counties
- 28th District: Columbia, Dutchess and Putnam counties
- 29th District: Delaware, Greene and Ulster counties
- 30th District: Albany County
- 31st District: Rensselaer County
- 32nd District: Saratoga and Schenectady counties
- 33rd District: Clinton, Essex, Warren and Washington counties
- 34th District: Franklin and St. Lawrence counties
- 35th District: Fulton, Hamilton, Herkimer and Lewis counties
- 36th District: Oneida County
- 37th District: Jefferson and Oswego counties
- 38th District: Onondaga County
- 39th District: Madison, Montgomery, Otsego and Schoharie counties
- 40th District: Broome, Chenango and Cortland counties
- 41st District: Chemung, Schuyler, Tioga and Tompkins counties
- 42nd District: Cayuga, Seneca and Wayne counties
- 43rd District: Ontario, Steuben and Yates counties
- 44th District: Allegany, Genesee, Livingston and Wyoming
- 45th and 46th District: Monroe County
- 47th District: Niagara and Orleans counties
- 48th, 49th and 50th District: Erie County
- 51st District: Cattaraugus and Chautauqua counties

=== Members ===
The asterisk (*) denotes members of the previous Legislature who continued in office as members of this Legislature. Peter J. McGarry, Kenneth F. Sutherland, Daniel F. Farrell, Jeremiah F. Twomey and Burt Z. Kasson changed from the Assembly to the Senate.

District	Senator	Party	Notes
1st	George L. Thompson*	Republican	re-elected
2nd	Frank F. Adel	Democrat	resigned his seat and ran unsuccessfully for Municipal Court Judge in the 3rd District of Queens
3rd	Peter J. McGarry*	Democrat	
4th	Kenneth F. Sutherland*	Democrat	
5th	Daniel F. Farrell*	Democrat	
6th	Loring M. Black Jr.	Democrat	
7th	Charles C. Lockwood*	Republican	re-elected
8th	Alvah W. Burlingame Jr.*	Republican	re-elected
9th	Charles E. Russell	Democrat	
10th	Jeremiah F. Twomey*	Democrat	
11th	Daniel J. Carroll*	Democrat	re-elected
12th	Jimmy Walker*	Democrat	re-elected
13th	John J. Boylan*	Democrat	re-elected
14th	Bernard Downing*	Dem./Rep.	re-elected
15th	Abraham Kaplan	Democrat	
16th	James A. Foley*	Democrat	re-elected; Minority Leader; resigned; on November 4, 1919, elected Surrogate of New York Co.
17th	Julius Miller	Democrat	
18th	Salvatore A. Cotillo*	Democrat	re-elected
19th	Edward J. Dowling*	Democrat	re-elected
20th	William C. Dodge	Democrat	
21st	Henry G. Schackno	Democrat	
22nd	Peter A. Abeles	Rep./Dem.	
23rd	John J. Dunnigan*	Democrat	re-elected
24th	John A. Lynch	Democrat	
25th	George T. Burling	Republican	
26th	Walter W. Law Jr.	Republican	
27th	Caleb H. Baumes	Republican	
28th	James E. Towner*	Republican	re-elected
29th	Charles W. Walton*	Republican	re-elected
30th	Henry M. Sage*	Republican	re-elected
31st	John J. Mackrell	Democrat	
32nd	James W. Yelverton*	Republican	re-elected
33rd	Mortimer Y. Ferris	Republican	
34th	N. Monroe Marshall*	Republican	re-elected
35th	Burt Z. Kasson*	Republican	
36th	Frederick M. Davenport	Republican	
37th	Fred B. Pitcher	Republican	
38th	J. Henry Walters*	Republican	re-elected; elected president pro tempore
39th	Adon P. Brown*	Republican	re-elected
40th	Clayton R. Lusk	Republican	
41st	Seymour Lowman	Republican	
42nd	Charles J. Hewitt*	Republican	re-elected
43rd	William A. Carson*	Republican	re-elected
44th	John Knight*	Rep./Dem.	re-elected
45th	James L. Whitley	Republican	
46th	John B. Mullan*	Republican	re-elected
47th	George F. Thompson*	Republican	re-elected
48th	Ross Graves*	Republican	re-elected; resigned on December 27, after his election as Commissioner of Finance and Accounts of Buffalo
49th	Samuel J. Ramsperger*	Democrat	re-elected
50th	Leonard W. H. Gibbs*	Republican	re-elected
51st	J. Samuel Fowler*	Republican	re-elected

=== Employees ===
- Clerk: Ernest A. Fay
- Sergeant-at-Arms: Charles R. Hotaling
- Assistant Sergeant-at-Arms:
- Principal Doorkeeper:
- First Assistant Doorkeeper:
- Stenographer: John K. Marshall

== State Assembly ==
=== Assemblymen ===
District		Assemblymen	Party	Notes
Albany	1st	Clarence F. Welsh*	Republican	
Albany	2nd	John G. Malone*	Republican	
Albany	3rd	James M. Gaffers*	Republican	
Allegany		William Duke Jr.*	Republican	
Bronx	1st	Earl H. Miller*	Democrat	
Bronx	2nd	Edward J. Flynn*	Democrat	
Bronx	3rd	Robert S. Mullen	Dem./Rep.	
Bronx	4th	M. Maldwin Fertig	Dem./Rep.	
Bronx	5th	William S. Evans	Dem./Rep.	
Bronx	6th	Thomas J. McDonald*	Democrat	
Bronx	7th	Joseph V. McKee*	Democrat	
Bronx	8th	J. Fairfax McLaughlin*	Democrat	
Broome	1st	Edmund B. Jenks*	Republican	
Broome	2nd	Forman E. Whitcomb*	Republican	
Cattaraugus		DeHart H. Ames*	Republican	
Cayuga		L. Ford Hager*	Republican	
Chautauqua	1st	Hermes L. Ames*	Rep./Dem.	
Chautauqua	2nd	Joseph A. McGinnies*	Republican	
Chemung		John J. Richford*	Republican	
Chenango		Bert Lord*	Republican	
Clinton		Wallace E. Pierce*	Rep./Dem.	
Columbia		John W. Scott	Republican	
Cortland		Irving F. Rice	Republican	
Delaware		Lincoln R. Long	Republican	
Dutchess	1st	J. Griswold Webb	Republican	
Dutchess	2nd	Frank L. Gardner*	Republican	
Erie	1st	George E. D. Brady	Republican	
Erie	2nd	John W. Slacer*	Republican	
Erie	3rd	Nicholas J. Miller*	Republican	
Erie	4th	Andrew T. Beasley	Dem./Rep.	
Erie	5th	Alexander A. Patrzykowski*	Democrat	
Erie	6th	George H. Rowe*	Republican	
Erie	7th	Herbert A. Zimmerman*	Republican	
Erie	8th	Nelson W. Cheney*	Republican	
Essex		Raymond T. Kenyon*	Rep./Dem.	
Franklin		Warren T. Thayer*	Republican	
Fulton and Hamilton		Eberly Hutchinson	Republican	
Genesee		Charles P. Miller	Rep./Dem.	
Greene		Harding Showers*	Republican	
Herkimer		Edward O. Davies*	Republican	
Jefferson		H. Edmund Machold*	Republican	
Kings	1st	John J. Griffith	Democrat	
Kings	2nd	Thomas J. Cox	Democrat	
Kings	3rd	Frank J. Taylor*	Democrat	
Kings	4th	Peter A. McArdle*	Democrat	
Kings	5th	James H. Caulfield Jr.*	Republican	
Kings	6th	Martin Solomon	Democrat	
Kings	7th	John J. Kelly	Democrat	
Kings	8th	Edward J. Flanagan	Democrat	
Kings	9th	Frederick S. Burr*	Democrat	
Kings	10th	Hoxie W. Smith*	Democrat	
Kings	11th	Thomas E. Brownlee*	Republican	
Kings	12th	Albert Link*	Democrat	
Kings	13th	Morgan T. Donnelly*	Democrat	
Kings	14th	Joseph Lentol	Democrat	
Kings	15th	Christian J. McWilliams	Democrat	
Kings	16th	David Drechsler	Democrat	
Kings	17th	Frederick A. Wells*	Republican	
Kings	18th	Charles C. Johnson	Democrat	
Kings	19th	Benjamin C. Klingmann*	Democrat	
Kings	20th	George J. Braun*	Democrat	
Kings	21st	Wilfred E. Youker*	Republican	
Kings	22nd	James J. Morris*	Democrat	
Kings	23rd	Charles Solomon	Socialist	
Lewis		Albert A. Copeley*	Republican	
Livingston		George F. Wheelock*	Republican	
Madison		Morell E. Tallett*	Republican	
Monroe	1st	James A. Harris*	Republican	
Monroe	2nd	Simon L. Adler*	Republican	Majority Leader
Monroe	3rd	Harry B. Crowley*	Republican	
Monroe	4th	Frank Dobson*	Republican	
Monroe	5th	Franklin W. Judson*	Republican	
Montgomery		Alton A. Walrath	Republican	
Nassau	1st	Thomas A. McWhinney*	Republican	
Nassau	2nd	Franklin A. Coles*	Republican	
New York	1st	Peter J. Hamill*	Democrat	
New York	2nd	Caesar B. F. Barra*	Democrat	
New York	3rd	Peter P. McElligott*	Democrat	
New York	4th	Samuel Dickstein	Dem./Rep.	
New York	5th	Charles D. Donohue*	Democrat	Minority Leader
New York	6th	Sol Ullman	Rep./Dem.	
New York	7th	Mary M. Lilly	Democrat	
New York	8th	Herman Weiss	Rep./Dem.	
New York	9th	Philip A. Walter	Democrat	
New York	10th	William W. Pellet	Republican	
New York	11th	William C. Amos*	Republican	
New York	12th	Martin G. McCue*	Democrat	
New York	13th	John J. Cronin	Democrat	
New York	14th	Mark Goldberg*	Democrat	
New York	15th	Joseph Steinberg	Republican	
New York	16th	Maurice Bloch*	Democrat	
New York	17th	August Claessens*	Socialist	
New York	18th	Owen M. Kiernan*	Democrat	
New York	19th	Martin J. Healy	Democrat	
New York	20th	Charles A. Winter*	Democrat	
New York	21st	John Clifford Hawkins	Republican	
New York	22nd	Earl A. Smith*	Democrat	
New York	23rd	B. Elliot Burston	Democrat	
Niagara	1st	William Bewley*	Republican	
Niagara	2nd	Nicholas V. V. Franchot II*	Republican	
Oneida	1st	Hartwell W. Booth	Republican	
Oneida	2nd	Louis M. Martin*	Republican	
Oneida	3rd	George T. Davis*	Republican	
Onondaga	1st	Manuel J. Soule*	Republican	
Onondaga	2nd	Gardner J. Chamberlin	Republican	
Onondaga	3rd	George R. Fearon*	Republican	
Ontario		George M. Tyler*	Republican	
Orange	1st	William F. Brush*	Republican	
Orange	2nd	Charles L. Mead*	Republican	
Orleans		Frank H. Lattin*	Republican	
Oswego		Thaddeus C. Sweet*	Republican	re-elected Speaker
Otsego		Allen J. Bloomfield*	Republican	
Putnam		John P. Donohoe*	Republican	
Queens	1st	Peter A. Leininger*	Democrat	
Queens	2nd	Bernard Schwab	Democrat	
Queens	3rd	John Kennedy*	Democrat	
Queens	4th	Frank E. Hopkins	Republican	
Queens	5th	Albert J. Brackley*	Democrat	
Queens	6th	William H. O'Hare*	Democrat	
Rensselaer	1st	John F. Shannon*	Democrat	
Rensselaer	2nd	Arthur Cowee*	Republican	
Richmond	1st	Thomas F. Curley*	Democrat	
Richmond	2nd	Henry A. Seesselberg*	Democrat	
Rockland		Gordon H. Peck*	Republican	
St. Lawrence	1st	Frank L. Seaker*	Republican	
St. Lawrence	2nd	Edward A. Everett*	Republican	
Saratoga		Clarence C. Smith	Republican	
Schenectady	1st	Walter S. McNab*	Republican	
Schenectady	2nd	A. Edgar Davies*	Republican	
Schoharie		Harry M. Greenwald	Republican	
Schuyler		Hiram H. Graham*	Republican	
Seneca		Lewis W. Johnson*	Republican	
Steuben	1st	Samuel E. Quackenbush*	Republican	
Steuben	2nd	Delevan C. Hunter	Republican	
Suffolk	1st	John G. Downs	Republican	
Suffolk	2nd	Ida B. Sammis	Republican	
Sullivan		William J. Brown	Republican	
Tioga		Daniel P. Witter*	Republican	
Tompkins		Casper Fenner*	Republican	
Ulster		Joel Brink*	Republican	
Warren		Frank C. Hooper*	Republican	
Washington		Eugene R. Norton	Republican	
Wayne		Frank D. Gaylord*	Republican	
Westchester	1st	Bertrand G. Burtnett*	Republican	
Westchester	2nd	Walter W. Westall	Republican	
Westchester	3rd	Edward J. Wilson	Republican	
Westchester	4th	Charles Vezin Jr.	Republican	
Westchester	5th	George Blakely*	Republican	
Wyoming		Bert P. Gage*	Republican	
Yates		James M. Lown Jr.*	Republican	

=== Employees ===
- Clerk: Fred W. Hammond
- Deputy Clerk: Wilson Messer
- Sergeant-at-Arms: Harry W. Haines
- Principal Doorkeeper:
- First Assistant Doorkeeper:
- Second Assistant Doorkeeper:
- Stenographer:
- Postmaster: James H. Underwood

== Sources ==
- NOMINEES ANALYZED BY CITIZENS UNION in NYT on October 27, 1918
- THE NEXT LEGISLATURE in NYT on November 6, 1918
- REPUBLICANS' LEAD CUT IN LEGISLATURE in NYT on November 7, 1918
- "WETS" WIN IN SENATE CAUCUS in NYT on January 1, 1919
