= Burt Z. Kasson =

American politician

Burt Zelotes Kasson (August 23, 1877 – September 26, 1943) was an American engineer and politician from New York.

== Life ==
He was the son of Harvey Zelotes Kasson and Ella (Dean) Kasson. He graduated from Phillips Exeter Academy in 1897. He attended Harvard College, but left without degree during his junior year, and then became a mining engineer and surveyor.

On November 22, 1911, he married Grace Adams Martin (born 1882), and they had several children, among them John Martin Kasson (1919–2008) who was Clerk of Fulton County.

Kasson was a member of the Board of Supervisors of Fulton County from 1912 to 1915; and was Chairman of the Board for two years. He was a member of the New York State Assembly (Fulton and Hamilton Co.) in 1916, 1917 and 1918; and a member of the New York State Senate (35th D.) in 1919 and 1920.

Later he was Fulton County Superintendent of Highways.

== Sources ==
- Class of 1901 (Harvard College, Secretary's Third Report, 1911, pg. 217)
- Class of 1901 (Harvard College, Secretary's Fourth Report, 1916, pg. 248f)
- Martin family at Schenectady History
- BURT Z. KASSON; Former State Senator in NYT on September 28, 1943 (subscription required)
- John Martin Kasson, his son's obit, in The Leader-Herald on February 21, 2008

New York State Assembly
Preceded by James H. Wood	New York State Assembly; Fulton and Hamilton Counties; 1916–1918	Succeeded by Eberly Hutchinson
New York State Senate
Preceded by Elon R. Brown	New York State Senate; 35th District; 1919–1920	Succeeded by Theodore Douglas Robinson
