= Peter A. Abeles =

American politician

Peter Aron Abeles
- Born: February 15, 1886; Oltenița, Kingdom of Romania
- Died: September 12, 1952 (aged 66); New York City, U.S.
- Occupations: Lawyer, politician, judge
- Known for: New York State Senator (1919–1920), Magistrate's Court judge (1935–1952)
- Spouse: Minerva Lobel
- Children: 5

Peter Aron Abeles (February 15, 1886 – September 12, 1952) was a Jewish Romanian-American lawyer, politician, and judge. Abeles served as a New York State Senator from the Bronx in 1919 and 1920, later working as a Special U.S. Attorney for the Department of Justice with the United States Court of Customs and Patent Appeals.

== Biography ==
Abeles was born on February 15, 1886, in Oltenița, Kingdom of Romania, the son of Aron Abeles and Rebecca Isser. He immigrated to America in 1895.

Abeles attended DeWitt Clinton High School. He started working as an accountant in around 1904. He then attended New York University School of Law, graduating from there in 1909. He was admitted to the bar in 1914 and began practicing law in New York City.

In 1918, Abeles was elected to the New York State Senate as a Republican with the endorsement of the Democratic Party, representing New York's 22nd State Senate district (parts of Bronx County). He served in the Senate in 1919 and 1920. From 1924 to 1935, he was a Special U.S. Attorney of the Department of Justice and worked with the United States Court of Customs and Patent Appeals. In 1935, Mayor La Guardia appointed him to the Magistrate's Court. Abeles and La Guardia were friends for many years. In 1941, he was reappointed to the court for a ten-year term.

Abeles was a member of the Bronx Bar Association, the Independent Order of B'nai B'rith, the Zionist Order of America, the New York State Association of Magistrates, the Freemasons, and was a director of the Hebrew Home for Chronic Invalids. In 1913, he married Minerva Lobel. Their children were Audrey Lobel, Lowell Isser, Sheldon Abbott, Rodman Brandon, and Arynne Lucy. Minerva was co-leader of the Fusion Party in the Bronx.

Abeles died from a heart ailment while in a stationery store, where he went to make a telephone call, on September 12, 1952.

New York State Senate
Preceded by John V. Sheridan	New York State Senate; 22nd District; 1919–1920	Succeeded by Edmund Seidel
