= Peter J. Hamill =

American politician (c.1885–1930)

- Assemblyman Hamill circa 1930

Minority Leader of the New York State Assembly
- In office January 1, 1930 – January 13, 1930
- Preceded by: Vacant, previously Maurice Bloch
- Succeeded by: Vacant. then Irwin Steingut

Member of the New York State Assembly
- In office January 1, 1918 – January 13, 1930
- Preceded by: John J. Ryan
- Succeeded by: Vacant, then James J. Dooling
- Constituency: New York County's 1st district
- In office January 1, 1916 – December 31, 1917
- Preceded by: Al Smith
- Succeeded by: Caesar B. F. Barra
- Constituency: New York County's 2nd district

Personal details
- Born: c. 1885 Manhattan, New York, New York, U.S.
- Died: January 13, 1930 Manhattan, New York, New York, U.S.
- Party: Democratic

Peter J. Hamill (c. 1885 – January 13, 1930) was an American politician who served in the New York State Assembly from 1917 to his death. A native of Lower Manhattan, he was affiliated with Tammany Hall from an early age and became a Tammany Hall leader in his Assembly district. In late 1929 he was chosen as the Minority Leader of the Assembly to replace Maurice Bloch, who had died of complications from an appendectomy. Hamill would himself be stricken with appendicitis a week later and die from complications of the surgery a week after that.

== Life ==
He attended the public schools. He entered politics as a Democrat, and was an Inspector of the New York City Bureau of Weights and Measures from 1910 to 1915. He married Matilda Van Axen, and they had two children, Mary and Peter Joseph.

Hamill was a member of the New York State Assembly in 1916, 1917, 1918, 1919, 1920, 1921, 1922, 1923, 1924, 1925, 1926, 1927, 1928, 1929 and 1930.

== Rise in Tammany Hall ==
Hamill was forced out of his house on 585 Broome Street in 1923 when it was demolished to make way for an approach to the Holland Tunnel. He and his family moved into 34 Dominick Street, a Federal-style rowhouse that had been constructed in 1826 and modified in 1866. After Thomas "Big Tom" Foley's death in 1925 he was chosen as Tammany Hall leader of the 1st assembly district, beating out such candidates as alderman Martin F. Tanahey and chief clerk of the first district municipal court Patrick Whelan. Tanahey and Whelan eventually respectively moved and seconded his leadership, and Hamill was elected as the leader on April 29. Tammany Hall would subsequently divide the district between Broadway; Hamill continued as leader of the part east of Broadway, eventually sharing this role with the wife of justice Thomas J. Nolan.

He was chosen Minority Leader at the opening of the session on January 1, 1930.

== Death ==
On January 6, he underwent an emergency operation for appendicitis, but remained ill in Stuyvesant Polyclinic Hospital in Manhattan for another week, dying there about 20 minutes past midnight on January 13. He was buried at the Holy Cross Cemetery in Brooklyn.

On January 23, 1930, his widow Matilda Van Axen Hamill was appointed as Supervisor of Investigators for the new Crime Prevention Bureau of the New York City Police Department at a salary of $4,500 ($73,000 in 2021) a year.

Matilda would retain the title to 34 Dominick Street until 1963. It was designated a New York City Landmark in 2011 over the opposition of its owners.

== Sources ==
- GUIDE FOR VOTERS BY CITIZENS UNION in NYT on October 28, 1917 ["Assemblyman 1916–7 with poor showing."]
- NOMINEES ANALYZED BY CITIZENS UNION in NYT on October 27, 1918 ["The three years' service of Peter J. Hamill has been without public benefit."]
- CITIZEN UNION GIVES LINE ON CANDIDATES in NYT on October 26, 1921 ["...an experienced and active member with a considerably improved record of votes over previous years, but the character of his legislation continues poor."]
- GOVERNOR IN THRONG AT HAMILL FUNERAL in NYT on January 17, 1930 (subscription required)

== Works cited ==
- 34 DOMINICK STREET HOUSE (PDF). Landmarks Preservation Commission of New York City. March 27, 2012. Archived from the original (PDF) on July 5, 2012.

New York State Assembly
Preceded by Al Smith	New York State Assembly; New York County, 2nd District; 1916–1917	Succeeded by Caesar B. F. Barra
Preceded by John J. Ryan	New York State Assembly; New York County, 1st District; January 1, 1918 – January 13, 1930	Succeeded by James J. Dooling
Vacant Title last held by Maurice Bloch	Minority Leader of the New York State Assembly; January 1 – 13, 1930	Vacant Title next held by Irwin Steingut
