= Albert J. Brackley =

American politician

Albert J. Brackley (January 11, 1874 – December 13, 1937) was an American politician from New York.

== Life ==
Brackley was born on January 11, 1874, in New Britain, Connecticut.

Brackely attended public school in Meriden and the Boston High School. He worked as a grocery salesman for a few years, and later worked in the real estate and insurance business. He moved to the Rockaways, New York, in around 1900, later settling in Far Rockaway.

Brackley was appointed corporation inspector of Queens by Queens borough president Maurice E. Connolly. In 1917, he was elected to the New York State Assembly as a Democrat, representing the Queens County 5th District. He served in the Assembly in 1918 and 1919. He later became inspector of cement for the Municipal Testing and Analyzing Bureau. He was a member of the Democratic County Committee and president of the Far Rockaway Regular Democratic Club.

Brackley was a member of the Knights of Columbus and the Holy Name Society of St. Mary Star of the Sea Roman Catholic Church. He was married to Louise, and his children were Albert Jr., Mrs. Cecilia Noonan, and Mrs. Rita Foster.

Brackley died at home from a heart attack while listening to a boxing match between Max Schmeling and Henry Thomas on the radio on December 13, 1937. He was buried in St. Mary's Cemetery in Lawrence.

New York State Assembly
| Preceded by District Created | New York State Assembly; Queens County, 5th District; 1918–1919 | Succeeded by Ralph Halpern |
