= 141st New York State Legislature =

New York state legislative session

←	140th	142nd	→
- New York State Capitol (2009)

Overview
- Legislative body: New York State Legislature
- Jurisdiction: New York, United States
- Term: January 1 – December 31, 1918

Senate
- Members: 51
- President: Lt. Gov. Edward Schoeneck (R)
- Temporary President: Elon R. Brown (R)
- Party control: Republican (36–14)

Assembly
- Members: 150
- Speaker: Thaddeus C. Sweet (R)
- Party control: Republican (97–43–10)

Sessions
- 1st: January 2 – April 13, 1918

The 141st New York State Legislature, consisting of the New York State Senate and the New York State Assembly, met from January 2 to April 13, 1918, during the fourth year of Charles S. Whitman's governorship, in Albany.

== Background ==
Under the provisions of the New York Constitution of 1894, re-apportioned in 1917, 51 Senators and 150 assemblymen were elected in single-seat districts; senators for a two-year term, assemblymen for a one-year term. The senatorial districts were made up of entire counties, except New York County (twelve districts), Kings County (eight districts), Erie County (three districts) and Monroe County (two districts). The Assembly districts were made up of contiguous area, all within the same county.

In 1917, the Legislature redistricted the Senate seats, and re-apportioned the number of assemblymen per county. Bronx County—which had been part of New York County at the time of the previous apportionment and occupied roughly the area of four Assembly districts—was properly separated, and was apportioned eight seats. New York County (without the Bronx) lost eight seats; and Erie, Jefferson and Ulster counties lost one seat each. Queens County gained two seats; and Broome, Nassau, Richmond, Schenectady and Westchester counties gained one seat each.

At this time there were two major political parties: the Republican Party and the Democratic Party. The Socialist Party and the Prohibition Party also nominated tickets.

== Elections ==
The 1917 New York state election, was held on November 6. The three statewide elective offices up for election were carried by the three incumbents: Attorney General Merton E. Lewis and two cross-endorsed judges of the New York Court of Appeals, viz. Democrat Benjamin N. Cardozo and Republican Chester B. McLaughlin. The approximate party strength at this election, as expressed by the vote for Attorney General, was: Republicans 697,000; Democrats 542,000; Socialists 169,000 and Prohibition 26,000.

Also, a constitutional amendment was adopted by the voters, which gave women the right to vote.

== Sessions ==
The Legislature met for the regular session at the State Capitol in Albany on January 2, 1918; and adjourned on April 13.

Thaddeus C. Sweet (R) was re-elected Speaker, with 88 votes against 33 for Charles D. Donohue (D) and 9 for Abraham I. Shiplacoff (S).

== State Senate ==
=== Districts ===
Note: The senators had been elected to a two-year term in November 1916 under the 1907 apportionment, as stated below. Although the Legislature re-apportioned the Senate districts in 1917, the first senatorial election under the new apportionment occurred in November 1918.

- 1st District: Nassau and Suffolk counties
- 2nd District: Queens County, i.e the Borough of Queens
- 3rd, 4th, 5th, 6th, 7th, 8th, 9th and 10th District: Parts of Kings County, i.e. the Borough of Brooklyn
- 11th, 12th, 13th, 14th, 15th, 16th, 17th, 18th, 19th and 20th District: Parts of New York County, i.e. the Borough of Manhattan
- 21st and 22nd District: Parts of Bronx County, i.e. the Borough of the Bronx
- 23rd District: Richmond and Rockland counties
- 24th District: Westchester County
- 25th District: Orange and Sullivan counties
- 26th District: Columbia, Dutchess and Putnam and counties
- 27th District: Greene and Ulster counties
- 28th District: Albany County
- 29th District: Rensselaer County
- 30th District: Saratoga and Washington counties
- 31st District: Montgomery, Schenectady and Schoharie counties
- 32nd District: Lewis, Fulton, Hamilton and Herkimer counties
- 33rd District: Clinton, Essex and Warren counties
- 34th District: Franklin and St. Lawrence counties
- 35th District: Jefferson and Oswego counties
- 36th District: Oneida County
- 37th District: Chenango, Madison and Otsego counties
- 38th District: Onondaga County
- 39th District: Broome and Delaware counties
- 40th District: Cayuga, Cortland and Seneca counties
- 41st District: Chemung, Schuyler, Tioga and Tompkins counties
- 42nd District: Ontario, Wayne and Yates counties
- 43rd District: Steuben and Livingston counties
- 44th District: Allegany, Genesee and Wyoming counties
- 45th and 46th District: Monroe County
- 47th District: Niagara and Orleans counties
- 48th, 49th and 50th District: Erie County
- 51st District: Cattaraugus and Chautauqua counties

=== Members ===
The asterisk (*) denotes members of the previous Legislature who continued in office as members of this Legislature.

Note: For brevity, the chairmanships omit the words "...the Committee on (the)..."

District	Senator	Party	Notes
1st	George L. Thompson*	Republican	
2nd	August E. Farrenkopf	Democrat	elected to fill vacancy, in place of Peter M. Daly
3rd	Thomas H. Cullen*	Democrat	on November 5, 1918, elected to the 66th U.S. Congress
4th	Charles C. Lockwood*	Republican	Chairman of Public Education
5th	(William J. Heffernan)*	Democrat	did not attend the session, and resigned on January 1 to accept an appointment as Deputy Clerk of Kings County
6th	Charles F. Murphy*	Republican	
7th	Daniel J. Carroll*	Democrat	
8th	Alvah W. Burlingame Jr.*	Republican	Chairman of Revision
9th	Robert R. Lawson*	Republican	Chairman of Printed and Engrossed Bill
10th	Alfred J. Gilchrist*	Republican	Chairman of Commerce and Navigation
11th	Bernard Downing*	Democrat	
12th	Jacob Koenig*	Democrat	
13th	Jimmy Walker*	Democrat	
14th	James A. Foley*	Democrat	
15th	John J. Boylan*	Democrat	
16th	Robert F. Wagner*	Democrat	Minority Leader; on November 5, 1918, elected to the New York Supreme Court
17th	Courtlandt Nicoll	Republican	elected to fill vacancy, in place of Ogden L. Mills; Chairman of Penal Institutions
18th	Albert Ottinger*	Republican	
19th	Edward J. Dowling*	Democrat	
20th	Salvatore A. Cotillo*	Democrat	
21st	John J. Dunnigan*	Democrat	
22nd	John V. Sheridan*	Democrat	
23rd	George Cromwell*	Republican	Chairman of Affairs of the City of New York
24th	George A. Slater*	Republican	on November 5, 1918, elected Surrogate of Westchester Co.
25th	John D. Stivers*	Republican	Chairman of Military Affairs
26th	James E. Towner*	Republican	Chairman of Insurance
27th	Charles W. Walton*	Republican	Chairman of Conservation
28th	Henry M. Sage*	Republican	Chairman of Finance
29th	George B. Wellington*	Republican	Chairman of Canals
30th	George H. Whitney*	Republican	Chairman of Public Health
31st	James W. Yelverton*	Republican	
32nd	Theodore Douglas Robinson*	Republican	
33rd	James A. Emerson*	Republican	Chairman of Taxation and Retrenchment
34th	N. Monroe Marshall*	Republican	Chairman of Banks
35th	Elon R. Brown*	Republican	Temporary President; Chairman of Rules; Chairman of War Measures
36th	Charles W. Wicks*	Republican	Chairman of Agriculture
37th	Adon P. Brown*	Republican	
38th	J. Henry Walters*	Republican	Chairman of Judiciary
39th	William H. Hill*	Republican	on November 5, 1918, elected to the 66th U.S. Congress
40th	Charles J. Hewitt*	Republican	Chairman of Internal Affairs of Towns, Counties and Public Highways
41st	Morris S. Halliday*	Republican	Chairman of Privileges and Elections; resigned on March 1 to join the U.S. Army Signal Corps
42nd	William A. Carson*	Republican	Chairman of Labor and Industry
43rd	Charles D. Newton*	Republican	Chairman of Codes; on November 5, 1918, elected New York Attorney General
44th	John Knight*	Republican	Chairman of Affairs of Villages
45th	George F. Argetsinger*	Republican	Chairman of Affairs of Cities
46th	John B. Mullan*	Republican	Chairman of Civil Service
47th	George F. Thompson*	Republican	Chairman of Public Service
48th	Ross Graves*	Republican	
49th	Samuel J. Ramsperger*	Democrat	
50th	Leonard W. H. Gibbs*	Republican	Chairman of Public Printing
51st	J. Samuel Fowler	Republican	elected to fill vacancy, in place of George E. Spring

=== Employees ===
- Clerk: Ernest A. Fay
- Sergeant-at-Arms: Charles R. Hotaling
- Assistant Sergeant-at-Arms: N. B. Sherrill
- Principal Doorkeeper: Lee V. Gardner
- First Assistant Doorkeeper: George W. Van Hyning
- Stenographer: John K. Marshall

== State Assembly ==
Note: For brevity, the chairmanships omit the words "...the Committee on (the)..."

=== Assemblymen ===
District		Assemblymen	Party	Notes
Albany	1st	Clarence F. Welsh*	Republican	
Albany	2nd	John G. Malone*	Republican	Chairman of Affairs of Cities
Albany	3rd	James M. Gaffers	Republican	
Allegany		William Duke Jr.*	Republican	Chairman of Codes
Bronx	1st	Earl H. Miller*	Democrat	
Bronx	2nd	Edward J. Flynn	Democrat	
Bronx	3rd	Benjamin Gitlow	Socialist	
Bronx	4th	Samuel Orr	Socialist	
Bronx	5th	Charles B. Garfinkel	Socialist	
Bronx	6th	Thomas J. McDonald	Democrat	
Bronx	7th	Joseph V. McKee	Democrat	
Bronx	8th	J. Fairfax McLaughlin	Democrat	
Broome	1st	Edmund B. Jenks*	Republican	
Broome	2nd	Forman E. Whitcomb	Republican	
Cattaraugus		DeHart H. Ames*	Republican	Chairman of Charitable and Religious Societies
Cayuga		L. Ford Hager*	Republican	
Chautauqua	1st	Hermes L. Ames	Republican	
Chautauqua	2nd	Joseph A. McGinnies*	Republican	
Chemung		John J. Richford	Republican	
Chenango		Bert Lord*	Republican	
Clinton		Wallace E. Pierce*	Republican	
Columbia		William J. Alvord	Republican	
Cortland		George H. Wiltsie*	Republican	Chairman of Banks
Delaware		James C. Nesbitt	Republican	
Dutchess	1st	James C. Allen*	Republican	
Dutchess	2nd	Frank L. Gardner*	Republican	Chairman of Insurance
Erie	1st	Alexander Taylor*	Republican	
Erie	2nd	John W. Slacer*	Republican	
Erie	3rd	Nicholas J. Miller*	Republican	Chairman of Excise
Erie	4th	James M. Mead*	Democrat	on November 5, 1918, elected to the 66th U.S. Congress
Erie	5th	Alexander A. Patrzykowski*	Democrat	
Erie	6th	George H. Rowe	Republican	
Erie	7th	Herbert A. Zimmerman*	Republican	
Erie	8th	Nelson W. Cheney*	Republican	Chairman of Claims
Essex		Raymond T. Kenyon*	Republican	Chairman of War
Franklin		Warren T. Thayer*	Republican	Chairman of Public Printing
Fulton and Hamilton		Burt Z. Kasson*	Republican	
Genesee		Louis H. Wells*	Republican	Chairman of Internal Affairs
Greene		Harding Showers*	Republican	
Herkimer		Edward O. Davies*	Republican	
Jefferson		H. Edmund Machold*	Republican	Chairman of Ways and Means
Kings	1st	Patrick H. Larney*	Democrat	
Kings	2nd	William H. Fitzgerald	Republican	
Kings	3rd	Frank J. Taylor*	Democrat	
Kings	4th	Peter A. McArdle*	Democrat	
Kings	5th	James H. Caulfield Jr.*	Republican	Chairman of Commerce and Navigation
Kings	6th	William M. Feigenbaum	Socialist	
Kings	7th	Daniel F. Farrell*	Democrat	
Kings	8th	John J. McKeon*	Democrat	
Kings	9th	Frederick S. Burr*	Democrat	
Kings	10th	Hoxie W. Smith	Democrat	
Kings	11th	Thomas E. Brownlee	Republican	
Kings	12th	Albert Link	Democrat	
Kings	13th	Morgan T. Donnelly*	Democrat	
Kings	14th	Joseph A. Whitehorn*	Socialist	
Kings	15th	Jeremiah F. Twomey*	Democrat	
Kings	16th	Kenneth F. Sutherland	Democrat	
Kings	17th	Frederick A. Wells*	Republican	Chairman of Military Affairs
Kings	18th	Marshall Snyder	Republican	
Kings	19th	Benjamin C. Klingmann*	Democrat	
Kings	20th	George J. Braun	Democrat	
Kings	21st	Wilfred E. Youker*	Republican	
Kings	22nd	James J. Morris	Democrat	
Kings	23rd	Abraham I. Shiplacoff*	Socialist	Socialist Leader
Lewis		Albert A. Copeley	Republican	
Livingston		George F. Wheelock*	Republican	
Madison		Morell E. Tallett*	Republican	Chairman of Public Education
Monroe	1st	James A. Harris*	Republican	
Monroe	2nd	Simon L. Adler*	Republican	Majority Leader
Monroe	3rd	Harry B. Crowley*	Republican	
Monroe	4th	Frank Dobson*	Republican	Chairman of Social Welfare
Monroe	5th	Franklin W. Judson*	Republican	Chairman of Taxation and Retrenchment
Montgomery		Erastus Corning Davis*	Republican	Chairman of Revision
Nassau	1st	Thomas A. McWhinney*	Republican	
Nassau	2nd	Franklin A. Coles	Republican	
New York	1st	Peter J. Hamill*	Democrat	
New York	2nd	Caesar B. F. Barra*	Democrat	
New York	3rd	Peter P. McElligott*	Democrat	
New York	4th	William Karlin	Socialist	
New York	5th	Charles D. Donohue*	Democrat	Minority Leader
New York	6th	Elmer Rosenberg	Socialist	
New York	7th	Abram Ellenbogen*	Republican	Chairman of General Laws
New York	8th	Louis Waldman	Socialist	
New York	9th	Martin Bourke*	Republican	
New York	10th	Eliot Tuckerman	Republican	
New York	11th	William C. Amos	Republican	contested by Joseph Shalleck (D)
New York	12th	Martin G. McCue*	Democrat	
New York	13th	Charles M. Havican	Democrat	
New York	14th	Mark Goldberg*	Democrat	
New York	15th	Schuyler M. Meyer*	Republican	
New York	16th	Maurice Bloch*	Democrat	
New York	17th	August Claessens	Socialist	
New York	18th	Owen M. Kiernan*	Democrat	
New York	19th	Edward A. Johnson	Republican	
New York	20th	Charles A. Winter	Democrat	
New York	21st	Harold C. Mitchell*	Republican	Chairman of Printed and Engrossed Bills
New York	22nd	Earl A. Smith*	Democrat	
New York	23rd	Ellis A. Bates	Republican	
Niagara	1st	William Bewley*	Republican	Chairman of Labor and Industries
Niagara	2nd	Nicholas V. V. Franchot II	Republican	
Oneida	1st	Henry D. Williams	Republican	
Oneida	2nd	Louis M. Martin*	Republican	
Oneida	3rd	George T. Davis*	Republican	
Onondaga	1st	Manuel J. Soule*	Republican	
Onondaga	2nd	Harley J. Crane*	Republican	
Onondaga	3rd	George R. Fearon*	Republican	
Ontario		George M. Tyler	Republican	
Orange	1st	William F. Brush*	Republican	
Orange	2nd	Charles L. Mead*	Republican	Chairman of Penal Institutions
Orleans		Frank H. Lattin*	Republican	
Oswego		Thaddeus C. Sweet*	Republican	re-elected Speaker; Chairman of Rules
Otsego		Allen J. Bloomfield*	Republican	
Putnam		John P. Donohoe*	Republican	
Queens	1st	Peter A. Leininger*	Democrat	
Queens	2nd	Peter J. McGarry*	Democrat	
Queens	3rd	John Kennedy	Democrat	
Queens	4th	L. Eugene Decker	Democrat	
Queens	5th	Albert J. Brackley	Democrat	
Queens	6th	William H. O'Hare*	Democrat	
Rensselaer	1st	John F. Shannon*	Democrat	
Rensselaer	2nd	Arthur Cowee*	Republican	
Richmond	1st	Thomas F. Curley	Democrat	
Richmond	2nd	Henry A. Seesselberg*	Democrat	
Rockland		Gordon H. Peck	Republican	
St. Lawrence	1st	Frank L. Seaker*	Republican	Chairman of Railroads
St. Lawrence	2nd	Edward A. Everett*	Republican	Chairman of Public Institutions
Saratoga		Gilbert T. Seelye*	Republican	Chairman of Public Health
Schenectady	1st	Walter S. McNab*	Republican	Chairman of Canals
Schenectady	2nd	A. Edgar Davies	Republican	
Schoharie		George A. Parsons*	Democrat	
Schuyler		Hiram H. Graham	Republican	
Seneca		Lewis W. Johnson*	Republican	
Steuben	1st	Samuel E. Quackenbush*	Republican	Chairman of Soldiers' Home
Steuben	2nd	Richard M. Prangen*	Republican	Chairman of Electricity, Gas and Water
Suffolk	1st	DeWitt C. Talmage*	Republican	Chairman of Conservation
Suffolk	2nd	Henry A. Murphy*	Republican	
Sullivan		William B. Voorhees	Republican	
Tioga		Daniel P. Witter*	Republican	Chairman of Agriculture
Tompkins		Casper Fenner*	Republican	
Ulster		Joel Brink*	Republican	
Warren		Frank C. Hooper	Republican	
Washington		Charles O. Pratt*	Republican	Chairman of Judiciary
Wayne		Frank D. Gaylord*	Republican	
Westchester	1st	Bertrand G. Burtnett	Republican	
Westchester	2nd	William J. Fallon	Republican	
Westchester	3rd	William Belknap	Democrat	
Westchester	4th	Mitchell A. Trahan Jr.	Republican	
Westchester	5th	George Blakely*	Republican	Chairman of Affairs of Villages
Wyoming		Bert P. Gage*	Republican	
Yates		James M. Lown Jr.	Republican	

=== Employees ===
- Clerk: Fred W. Hammond
- Sergeant-at-Arms: Harry W. Haines
- Principal Doorkeeper: Charles Furman
- First Assistant Doorkeeper: James B. Hulse
- Second Assistant Doorkeeper: A. H. Bunnell
- Stenographer: Samuel Bruckheimer
- Committee Clerk: Wilson Messer
- Postmaster: James H. Underwood

== Sources ==
- Journal of the Senate (140th Session) (1918; Vol. I, from January 2 to April 1)
- Journal of the Assembly (141st Session) (1918; Vol. I, from January 2 to March 18)
- GUIDE FOR VOTERS BY CITIZENS UNION in NYT on October 28, 1917
- LEGISLATORS ELECTED in NYT on November 7, 1917
- TEN SOCIALISTS IN THE ASSEMBLY in NYT on November 8, 1917
