= William W. Pellet =

American politician (1879–1965)

William Waldo Pellet (April 2, 1879 – December 7, 1965) was an American lawyer and politician from New York.

== Early life and education ==
Pellet was born on April 2, 1879, in Watkins, New York, the son of William M. Pellet and Esther Lockwood.

Pellet began attending Cornell University in 1896, graduating from there with an LL.B. in 1901.

== Career ==
He then began working as a lawyer in New York City.

In 1918, Pellet was elected to the New York State Assembly as a Republican, representing the New York County 10th District. He served in the Assembly in 1919 and 1920. He served as Deputy Attorney General of New York in 1922. He was at one point a member of the law firm Lehmaier & Pellet. He later joined the law firm Pellet, Fay & Rubin. By the time he retired, he was practicing law in New York City for over 50 years.

Pellet was a member of the Cornell Club.

== Personal life ==
He was married to Elsie A. Carlson. They had two sons and four daughters.

== Death ==
Pellet died in a nursing home in Summit, New Jersey, on December 7, 1965.

New York State Assembly
| Preceded by Eliot Tuckerman | New York State Assembly; New York County, 10th District; 1919–1920 | Succeeded by Bernard Aronson |
