= Nelson W. Cheney =

American politician

Nelson Welch Cheney (June 27, 1875 – November 23, 1944) was an American politician from New York.

== Life ==
He was born on June 27, 1875, in Buffalo, New York, the son of Edgar Orlando Cheney (1843–1904) and Philena C. (Welch) Cheney. There he attended the public schools, and Central High School. He graduated B.A. from Cornell University in 1899.

On June 4, 1904, he married Edith Ingram, and they had four children. They lived in Eden

Cheney was a member of the New York State Assembly in 1916, 1917 (both Erie Co., 9th D.), 1918, 1919, 1920, 1921, 1922, 1923, 1924, 1925, 1926, 1927, 1928 and 1929 (all twelve Erie Co., 8th D.). He was Chairman of the Committee on Claims in 1918, and later for many years Chairman of the Committee on Banks.

He was a member of the New York State Senate (50th D.) from 1930 to 1938, sitting in the 152nd, 153rd, 154th, 155th, 156th, 157th, 158th, 159th, 160th and 161st New York State Legislatures.

He died on November 23, 1944; and was buried at the Forest Lawn Cemetery in Buffalo.

Assemblyman Nelson Welch (1808–1900) was his grandfather.

== Notes ==
New York State Assembly
Preceded by Frank B. Thorn	New York State Assembly; Erie County, 9th District; 1916–1917	Succeeded by district abolished
Preceded by Herbert A. Zimmerman	New York State Assembly; Erie County, 8th District; 1918–1929	Succeeded by R. Foster Piper
New York State Senate
Preceded by Charles A. Freiberg	New York State Senate; 50th District; 1930–1938	Succeeded by Arthur L. Swartz
