= Joel Brink =

American politician

Joel Brink (June 1, 1868 in Lake Katrine, Ulster County, New York – December 31, 1939 in Lake Katrine) was an American politician from New York.

== Early life ==
Brink was born on the Brink Homestead in Lake Katrine, son of Andrew Brink (1835–1904) and his wife, Sarah Maria (née Osterhoudt) Brink (1834–1901). This homestead was different from the old Brink house in Mount Marion, which had been in the family since 1721. This house in Lake Katrine had stood since 1780. Both the Brink and Osterhoudt families were early settlers to Ulster County, having come from the Netherlands. One of the earliest Brink ancestors to the United States, Cornelis Lambertson Brink, was born at sea as his parents sailed over the Atlantic.

Brink was educated at the Lake Katrine Public School, and then Kingston Academy in Kingston, before joining his brother Theodore in a mercantile business that their father had started. This business was widely-known due to the successful nature in which Andrew Brink had run it.

== Political career ==
In 1903, Brink sought his first public office. The hamlet of Lake Katrine was situated in the town of Ulster, and for quite some time, corruption existed in the towns elections and elected officials. Brink was the Republican candidate for the office of supervisor, and garnered quite heavy support from both parties. At one point during the elections, Brink's opponent had received such a significant majority of votes from one district of the town, that it appeared that Brink had lost. However, following a recount, Brink was declared the winner, and became the first Republican elected from the town of Ulster in over 20 years.

The office of supervisor at that time was a two-year term, and Brink was re-elected to three more terms, retiring after 1911. At the time of his retirement, Brink's eight years as supervisor was the second-longest term thus far for a supervisor in the town's young history.

During his terms as supervisor, Brink took a financial situation in disarray within the town and helped to improve it through honest means and sensible business administration. His experience in the mercantile business helped to shape his approach as supervisor to the town's needs and issues. As the supervisor, Brink was a member of the Ulster County Board of Supervisors, an organization that helped to shape the county and its decision-making; Brink served as this body's chairman from 1908 to 1909.

Brink took a few years away from politics before running for election to the New York State Assembly in 1916. Brink would win this election, and served in 1917, alongside Abraham Philip LeFevre as the representatives from Ulster County, in 1918 and in 1919 as the lone representative, after Ulster County became one district. Brink would not seek re-election.

In 1925, Brink was elected as the Ulster County Treasurer, serving from 1926 to 1928.

== Other organizations ==
For many years, Brink served as one of the board of managers of the Ulster County Tuberculosis Hospital. He was also a trustee of the Ulster County Savings Institution starting on July 19, 1921, and would stay in this position until January 17, 1938, when he was elected president. He served as the head of this institution until his death.

Brink was also a member of the Lake Katrine Grange, the Kingston Kiwanis Club, and Kingston Lodge number 10, Free and Accepted Masons (F. & A.M.).

== Personal life ==
Brink married Anna Elizabeth Kieffer on June 15, 1898, in Lake Katrine. Anna was born in 1877 in Lake Katrine, and was Joel's second cousin through the Kieffer family and second cousin, once removed, through the Brink family. Joel and Anna had a son, Hubert Brink (1906–1975). Joel would die on December 31, 1939, at his home in Lake Katrine. Anna died on August 2, 1945, in Kingston. They are buried in Wiltwyck Cemetery in Kingston.

Brink's brother, Theodore Brink (1860–1936), served as the Lake Katrine postmaster from the formation of the post office in 1889, until his death in 1936, a total of 48 years. Brink's first cousin, once removed, Frank Marion Brink (1875–1944), succeeded him as supervisor of the town of Ulster, his service dating from 1912 to 1925. Another first cousin, once removed, was Jacob Brink (1808–1879), the supervisor of the town of Kingston from 1875 to 1876. Jacob's son, Joel's second cousin, Erastus Brink (1838–1902), succeeded his father as supervisor of the town of Kingston in 1877. His second cousin, George Matthew Brink (1848–1905), was a city supervisor from the 3rd department in Kingston, New York from 1888 to 1889, then a New York State Assemblyman from 1891 to 1892, and then the Kingston postmaster from 1898 to 1902.

Brink's grandsons, David T. Brink and Joel B. Brink, both served as town councilmen in the Town of Ulster.

New York State Assembly
| Preceded by Henry McNamee | Ulster Supervisor; Ulster County; 1904-1911 | Succeeded by Frank M. Brink |
| Preceded by Vactor Shultis | Chairman of the Ulster County Board of Supervisors; 1908-1909 | Succeeded by W. Kelly Shook |
| Preceded by Henry Richard DeWitt | New York State Assembly; Ulster County, 1st District; 1917 | Succeeded by County Merged Into One District |
| Preceded by County Merged Into One District | New York State Assembly; Ulster County; 1918-1919 | Succeeded by Simon B. Van Wagonen |
