= Daniel F. Farrell =

American politician

Daniel F. Farrell (c. 1869 – June 18, 1939) was an American politician from New York.

== Life ==
He attended St. Patrick's Academy in Brooklyn; and then became a hatter.

Farrell was a member of the New York State Assembly (Kings Co., 7th D.) in 1910, 1911, 1912, 1913, 1914, 1915, 1916, 1917 and 1918; and was Chairman of the Committee on Commerce and Navigation in 1913.

He was a member of the New York State Senate (5th D.) from 1919 to 1930, sitting in the 142nd, 143rd, 144th, 145th, 146th, 147th, 148th, 149th, 150th, 151st, 152nd and 153rd New York State Legislatures. He resigned his seat in August 1930, and was appointed as Deputy Register of Kings County.

He died on June 18, 1939, at his home at 1472 East 9th Street in Brooklyn.

== Sources ==
- "Guide for Voters by Citizens Union" (PDF). The New York Times. October 28, 1917.
- "Farrell Resigns as State Senator". The New York Times. August 16, 1930.
- "Daniel F. Farrell; Former State Legislator and Kings Deputy Register". The New York Times. August 16, 1930.

New York State Assembly
Preceded by Thomas J. Geoghegan	New York State Assembly; Kings County, 7th District; 1910–1918	Succeeded by John J. Kelly
New York State Senate
Preceded by William J. Heffernan	New York State Senate; 5th District; 1919–1930	Succeeded by John J. Howard
