= Louis M. Martin =

American politician

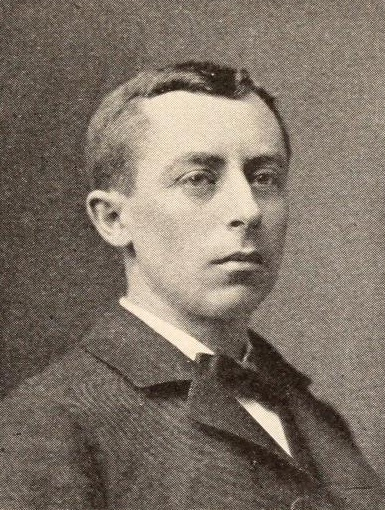
- Louis M. Martin (1900)

Personal details
- Born: November 25, 1863 Madison, Madison County, New York
- Died: March 1940 (aged 76) Utica, New York
- Resting place: Sunset Hill Cemetery in Clinton
- Party: Republican
- Occupation: Lawyer, politician

Louis Marshall Martin (November 25, 1863 – March 1940) was an American lawyer and politician from New York.

== Life ==
He was born on November 25, 1863, in Madison, Madison County, New York. He attended school and worked on the family farm. He graduated from Hamilton Union School in 1880, and from Clinton Grammar School in 1885. From 1887 to 1890, he taught school, and read law. In 1888, he was elected a Justice of the Peace in the Town of Kirkland. In 1889, he married M. Louise Foucher (1869–1956). He was Principal of the Clinton Public School from 1889 to 1890 when he was admitted to the bar. He practiced law in Clinton, and entered politics as a Republican.

Martin was a member of the New York State Assembly (Oneida Co., 2nd D.) in 1898, 1899 and 1900; and was Chairman of the Committee on Internal Affairs of Towns and Counties in 1900. Afterwards he was a Deputy New York Attorney General.

He was again a member of the State Assembly in 1916, 1917, 1918, 1919, 1920 and 1921. He was Chairman of the Committee on the Judiciary from 1920 to 1921, and as such presided over the trial of the five Socialist assemblymen in 1920 which ended with their expulsion from the Assembly.

Martin was a justice of the New York Supreme Court (5th D.) from 1922 to 1926 when he resigned because of ill health.

He died on March 1, 1940, in St. Elizabeth's Hospital in Utica, New York; and was buried at the Sunset Hill Cemetery in Clinton.

== The Martin Act ==
Martin sponsored the Martin Act which was passed by the New York Legislature in 1921(New York General Business Law article 23-A, sections 352–353). The Martin Act is a New York anti-fraud law, widely considered to be the most severe blue sky law in the country. The Act grants the Attorney General of New York expansive law enforcement powers to conduct investigations of securities fraud and bring civil or criminal actions against alleged violators of the Act.

Albert Ottinger became the first New York Attorney General to make use of the Act in 1925, ultimately using it to shut down the Consolidated Stock Exchange. Following Ottinger's tenure, the Act remained largely dormant for decades. For the remainder of the 20th century, the Act was known mainly for investigations of "small-time fraud."

NY Attorney General Eliot Spitzer is credited with having revived the law during his tenure, and his office launched a Martin Act investigation against Merrill Lynch for suspected fraud in 2001. Ultimately, Merrill settled, agreeing to pay a $100 million fine and change the way its analysts are paid to head off possible criminal charges that it misled investors with tainted stock research.

In September 2022, New York Attorney General Letitia James filed suit against the Trump Organization, having demonstrated liability by Donald Trump, his sons Donald Trump Jr. and Eric Trump, along with the Trump Organization's former Chief Financial Officer Allen Weisselberg.

On September 26, 2023, Manhattan Justice Arthur Engoron ruled that Donald J. Trump was liable for fraud ahead of trial in the New York Attorney General's lawsuit (accusing him of exaggerating his net worth by billions of dollars a year on financial records submitted to banks and insurers) – a major blow to the former president in the biggest civil case against him. Trump, his top executives, and heirs were declared completely liable of "persistent and repeated fraud", and the real estate empire was unceremoniously stripped of its business licenses in New York, ahead of a massive trial that seeks to hit them with more than $250 million in penalties for bank fraud.

== Sources ==
New York State Assembly
Preceded by William Cary Sanger	New York State Assembly; Oneida County; 1898–1900	Succeeded by Fred J. Brill
Preceded by Charles J. Fuess	New York State Assembly; Oneida County; 1916–1921	Succeeded by Russell G. Dunmore
