= J. Samuel Fowler =

American lawyer and politician

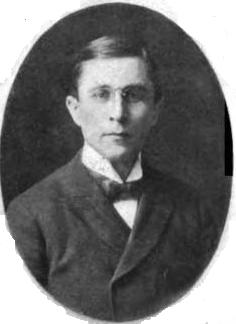
J. Samuel Fowler (1903)

J. Samuel Fowler (June 15, 1874 in Harmony, Chautauqua County, New York – 1961) was an American lawyer and politician from New York.

== Life ==
He was the son of Rev. Dexter S. Fowler (1839–1908) and Annettie (Losee) Fowler. He attended Sherman Union School, and graduated from Jamestown High School. He began to study law in the office of Walter L. Sessions in 1893, graduated from Albany Law School in 1895, was admitted to the bar in 1896, and practiced in Jamestown and Panama. On December 7, 1898, he married Velma Steward (1874–1955), and their only child was Donald Steward Fowler.

Fowler entered politics as a Republican, and was instrumental in 1895 in securing the nomination of Jerome Babcock in the 1st Chautauqua Assembly district. In 1896, he joined the Free Silver Republicans, a minority faction opposed to the large majority of Republicans who supported the Gold standard. He was Supervisor of the Town of Harmony from 1896 to 1899, elected on a Republican/Democratic fusion ticket. In 1898, he was nominated by the Republican 1st Chautauqua district convention on the 51st ballot for the State Assembly.

He was a member of the New York State Assembly (Chautauqua Co., 1st D.) in 1899, 1900, 1901, 1902 and 1903; and was Chairman of the Committee on State Prisons in 1900, of the Committee on Affairs of Villages in 1901 and 1902, and of the Committee on General Laws in 1903.

He was a member of the New York State Senate (51st D.) from 1918 to 1920, sitting in the 141st, 142nd and 143rd New York State Legislatures. In March 1920, he sponsored a bill—passed in the Senate by a vote of 26 to 25—which repealed the statewide Daylight Saving Time, but gave local authorities the option to adopt it.

He was buried at the Lake View Cemetery in Jamestown, New York.

== Sources ==
- Official New York from Cleveland to Hughes by Charles Elliott Fitch (Hurd Publishing Co., New York and Buffalo, 1911, Vol. IV; pg. 340f, 343 and 345f)
- The New York Red Book by Edgar L. Murlin (1903; pg. 136)
- History of Harmony, NY transcribed from History of Chautauqua County, New York and Its People by John P. Downs & Fenwick Y. Hedley (1921), at Ray's Place
- A FREE–SILVER REPUBLICAN in NYT on July 1, 1898
- 26–25 AGAINST LIGHT LAW in NYT on March 30, 1920
- Bio transcribed from Who's Who in Jamestown (1922)

New York State Assembly
Preceded by Frederick R. Peterson	New York State Assembly; Chautauqua County, 1st District; 1899–1903	Succeeded by Arthur C. Wade
New York State Senate
Preceded by George E. Spring	New York State Senate; 51st District; 1918–1920	Succeeded by DeHart H. Ames
