= Gilbert T. Seelye =

American politician

Gilbert Seelye

Gilbert Thompson Seelye (September 9, 1877 – February 14, 1962) was an American farmer and politician from New York.

== Life ==
He was born on September 9, 1877, in Burnt Hills, Saratoga County, New York, the son of Nathan Alson Seelye and Mary Susan (Thompson) Seelye. He attended the district school, and Schenectady High School. Then he worked on his family's farm.

Seelye was a member of the New York State Assembly (Saratoga Co.) in 1913, 1914, 1915, 1916, 1917 and 1918; and was Chairman of the Committee on Public Health from 1914 to 1918.

On April 9, 1928, he married Elsie (also "Betty") Langdon Bogert (1892–1991), and they had two daughters, Mary Elizabeth Seeley (Mary "Bunny" Seelye Guyer) and Nancy Seeley.

He was Supervisor of the Town of Ballston from 1936 to 1938.

He was a member of the New York State Senate from 1939 to 1960, sitting in the 162nd, 163rd, 164th, 165th, 166th, 167th, 168th, 169th, 170th, 171st and 172nd New York State Legislatures.

He died on February 14, 1962, in Glenridge Hospital in Glenville, Schenectady County, New York; and was buried at the Calvary Episcopal Cemetery in Burnt Hills, New York.

== Sources ==
New York State Assembly
| Preceded by George H. Whitney | New York State Assembly; Saratoga County; 1913–1918 | Succeeded by Clarence C. Smith |
New York State Senate
| Preceded by Edwin E. Miller | New York State Senate; 32nd District; 1939–1944 | Succeeded by Thomas C. Desmond |
| Preceded by William H. Hampton | New York State Senate; 36th District; 1945–1954 | Succeeded by Peter J. Dalessandro |
| Preceded by Robert C. McEwen | New York State Senate; 39th District; 1955–1960 | Succeeded by George E. Paine |
