= Warren T. Thayer =

American politician (1869–1956)

Warren Thomas Thayer (July 12, 1869, in Burke, New York – March 9, 1956, in Malone, Franklin Co., NY) was an American politician from New York.

== Life ==
He was the son of Alfred Chambers Thayer (1836–1910) and Hulda A. (Hall) Thayer (1837–1910). On June 16, 1896, he married Haseltine Miller (1868–1951), and they had two children.

Thayer was a member of the New York State Assembly (Franklin Co.) in 1916, 1917, 1918, 1919 and 1920; and was Chairman of the Committee on Public Printing in 1918.

He was a member of the New York State Senate (34th D.) from 1921 to 1934, sitting in the 144th, 145th, 146th, 147th, 148th, 149th, 150th, 151st, 152nd, 153rd, 154th, 155th, 156th and 157th New York State Legislatures; and was Chairman of the Committee on Public Service from 1927 to 1932. On March 29, 1934, Thayer was accused before the Federal Trade Commission of having received money from the Associated Gas and Electric Company of Albany, to act as a lobbyist for the company while being chairman of the senate committee in charge of the pertaining legislation. An investigation of Thayer by the State Senate followed, and Thayer was tried before the Senate Committee on the Judiciary. Thayer resigned his seat on June 11, while the Legislature was in recess. The State Senate met on June 19 for a special session, and found Thayer guilty of official misconduct (and would have removed Thayer from office, had he not resigned) by the unanimous vote of the 47 senators present.

Thayer died on March 9, 1956, in Alice Hyde Hospital in Malone, New York; and was buried at the East Side Cemetery in Chateaugay, New York.

== Sources ==
- STATE SENATOR'S LETTERS INDICATE ASSOCIATED GAS PAID FOR POLITICAL WORK in NYT on March 30, 1934 (subscription required)
- INQUIRY ON THAYER TO START MONDAY VOTED BY SENATE in NYT on April 4, 1934 (subscription required)
- LEGISLATORS VOTE UTILITIES INQUIRY OF SWEEPING SCOPE in NYT on April 21, 1934 (subscription required)
- THAYER RECEIVED $21,600 UTILITY PAY in NYT on May 9, 1934 (subscription required)
- W. T. THAYER QUITS HIS SEAT IN SENATE FOR GOOD OF PARTY in NYT on June 12, 1934 (subscription required)
- THAYER HELD GUILTY BY STATE SENATE in NYT on June 20, 1934 (subscription required)
- WARREN THAYER, EX-LAWMAKER, 87 in NYT on March 10, 1956 (subscription required)

New York State Assembly
| Preceded by Alexander Macdonald | New York State Assembly; Franklin County; 1916–1920 | Succeeded by Anson H. Ellsworth |
New York State Senate
| Preceded by N. Monroe Marshall | New York State Senate; 34th District; 1921–1934 | Succeeded by Rhoda Fox Graves |
