= Adon P. Brown =

American politician (1873–1942)

Adon P. Brown (October 12, 1873 – April 22, 1942) was an American lawyer and politician from New York.

== Life ==
He was the son of Henry Brown (1830–1888) and Jennie L. (White) Brown.

He practiced law in Leonardsville.

Brown was a member of the New York State Senate from 1917 to 1920, sitting in the 140th, 141st (both 37th D.), 142nd and 143rd New York State Legislatures (both 39th D.); and was Chairman of the Committee on Agriculture in 1920.

He died on April 22, 1942, in Tampa, Florida; and was buried at the Leonardsville Cemetery.

New York Solicitor General Wendell P. Brown (c.1884–1966) was his brother.

== Sources ==
- STATE MILK CONTROL BILL INTRODUCED in NYT on January 29, 1920
- DOWNING THREATENS TO CHASTISE BROWN in NYT on April 3, 1920
- ADON P. BROWN; Ex-State Senator at Albany Dies at 68 in Tampa, Fla. in NYT on April 24, 1942 (subscription required)
- WENDELL BROWN, STATE AIDE, DEAD, his brother's obit, in NYT on March 1, 1966 (subscription required)

New York State Senate
Preceded by Samuel A. Jones	New York State Senate; 37th District; 1917–1918	Succeeded by Fred B. Pitcher
Preceded by William Henry Hill	New York State Senate; 39th District; 1919–1920	Succeeded by Allen J. Bloomfield
