= William A. Carson =

American politician

William A. Carson (August 3, 1863 – April 29, 1949) was an American politician from New York.

== Life ==
Born in Rushville, New York, he graduated from Rushville High School, and Hobart College.

Carson was first elected to the New York State Senate in 1916, and served from 1917 to 1922, sitting in the 140th, 141st (both 42nd D.), 142nd, 143rd, 144th and 145th New York State Legislatures (all four 43rd D.).

Carson died in Syracuse, New York, after a three-week hospitalization.

== Sources ==
- New York Red Book (1917; pg. 115)

New York State Senate
Preceded by Thomas B. Wilson	New York State Senate; 42nd District; 1917–1918	Succeeded by Charles J. Hewitt
Preceded by Charles D. Newton	New York State Senate; 43rd District; 1919–1922	Succeeded by Ernest E. Cole
