= Allen J. Bloomfield =

American politician and businessman (1883–1932)

Allen J. Bloomfield (May 29, 1883 – September 21, 1932) was an American businessman and politician from New York.

== Early life and education ==
He was born in Warren, New York to Charles W. and Elizabeth (McCredy) Bloomfield. He graduated B.A. from Columbia College.

== Career ==
In 1904, and then engaged in the hotel business in Richfield Springs.

Bloomfield was a member of the New York State Assembly (Otsego Co.) in 1915, 1916, 1917, 1918, 1919 and 1920.

He was a member of the New York State Senate (39th D.) from 1921 to 1924, sitting in the 144th, 145th, 146th and 147th New York State Legislatures. Later he continued to hold a variety of civic offices, and at the time of his death was President of the Village of Richfield Springs.

== Personal life ==
On October 31, 1906, he married Renelcha (Elderkin) Tuller (died c. 1910), and they had two children. In 1915, he married Ruby Emma (Newcomb) Quick, and they had two daughters.

== Death ==
He died on September 21, 1932, in Mary Imogene Bassett Hospital in Cooperstown, New York, after an operation for a ruptured appendix; and was buried at the Lakeview Cemetery in Richfield Springs.

== Sources ==
- General register of the members of the Phi Kappa sigma fraternity, 1850-1930 (1930; pg. 264)
- The Hon. Allen J. Bloomfield in The Otsego Farmer on September 23, 1932 (with portrait)

New York State Assembly
Preceded by George L. Bockes	New York State Assembly; Otsego County; 1915–1920	Succeeded by Julian C. Smith
New York State Senate
Preceded by Adon P. Brown	New York State Senate; 39th District; 1921–1924	Succeeded by Willis Wendell
