= Hermes L. Ames =

American politician

Hermes Luther Ames (October 28, 1865 – August 23, 1920) was an American farmer and politician from New York.

== Life ==
He was born on October 28, 1865, on a farm in Carroll, Chautauqua County, New York, the son of Ezra Wales Ames (1841–1923) and Loretta M. (Woodward) Ames (1840–1912). He engaged in agricultural pursuits. He also taught school in Falconer. On June 20, 1894, he married Minta E. Brunson (1870–1963), and they had two children.

Ames entered politics as a Republican, and was elected President of the Village of Falconer in 1916. He was a member of the New York State Assembly (Chautauqua Co., 1st D.) in 1918, 1919 and 1920.

In August 1920, while repairing a damaged silo on his farm near Falconer, he fell 14-feet down from the scaffolding. He broke his right foot which was amputated. He died about two weeks later, on August 23, 1920, and was buried at the Pine Hill Cemetery in Falconer.

== Sources ==
New York State Assembly
| Preceded by Leon L. Fancher | New York State Assembly; Chautauqua County, 1st District; 1918–1920 | Succeeded by Judson S. Wright |
