= Bernard Downing =

American politician

Bernard Downing (August 14, 1869 in New York City – May 25, 1931 in Liberty, Sullivan County, New York) was an American politician from New York.

== Life ==
He was the son of Charles Downing and Margaret Oakes Downing. He became an accountant.

Downing was a member of the New York State Senate from 1917 until his death in 1931, sitting in the 140th, 141st, 142nd, 143rd, 144th, 145th, 146th, 147th, 148th, 149th, 150th, 151st, 152nd, 153rd and 154th New York State Legislatures; and was Minority Leader from 1926 to 1931.

He died on May 25, 1931, at the Loomis Sanitarium in Liberty, New York, of intestinal tuberculosis; and was buried at the Calvary Cemetery in Queens.

== Sources ==
- SENATOR DOWNING DIES AT 62 in NYT on May 26, 1931 (subscription required)

New York State Senate
Preceded by Christopher D. Sullivan	New York State Senate; 11th District; 1917–1918	Succeeded by Daniel J. Carroll
Preceded by James A. Foley	New York State Senate; 14th District; 1919–1931	Succeeded by Edward J. Ahearn
Preceded by Jimmy Walker	Minority Leader in the New York State Senate; 14th District; 1926–1931	Succeeded by John J. Dunnigan
