= Kenneth F. Sutherland =

American politician

Kenneth F. Sutherland (October 2, 1888 on Coney Island, Kings County, New York – November 14, 1954 in Sea Gate, Brooklyn, New York City) was an American politician from New York.

== Life ==
He was the Democratic leader of Coney Island from 1917 until his death in 1954.

Sutherland was a member of the New York State Assembly (Kings Co., 16th D.) in 1918; and a member of the New York State Senate (4th D.) in 1919 and 1920.

In 1933, he supported Joseph V. McKee for Mayor of New York City, and was removed by Mayor John P. O'Brien from his post as Assistant to the President of the Board of Aldermen.

In June 1938, Sutherland was appointed as General Clerk of the New York Supreme Court in Brooklyn.

He was Chairman of the Kings County Democratic Committee from 1952 to 1954.

He died on November 14, 1954, at his home in Sea Gate, Brooklyn.

New York State Assembly
Preceded by Samuel R. Green	New York State Assembly; Kings County, 16th District; 1918	Succeeded by David Drechsler
New York State Senate
Preceded by Charles C. Lockwood	New York State Senate; 4th District; 1919–1920	Succeeded by Maxwell S. Harris
