= Thomas A. McWhinney =

American politician

Thomas Alexander McWhinney (February 25, 1864 – November 25, 1933) was an American politician from New York. He served nine terms in the New York State Assembly.

== Early life ==
McWhinney was born on February 25, 1864, in Brooklyn, New York, the son of Thomas McWhinney and Margaret Morrison. His father was an Irish immigrant from Castle Dawson, Ireland. His mother was also an Irish immigrant, but not much is known about her background.

== Career ==
After finishing school, McWhinney began learning the plumber's trade. When he was eighteen, he entered the business on his own account. He worked in the building business until 1891, when he moved to Lawrence and established a plumbing business there. He was a member of the New York Republican State Committee from 1888 to 1889, a fire commissioner in Lawrence, and was part of the 47th Regiment, New York National Guard for ten years.

In May 1898, during the Spanish–American War, McWhinney enlisted in the 47th Regiment Infantry and was mustered in as quartermaster-sergeant of Company E. In November 1898, he was promoted to second lieutenant. He was sent to Puerto Rico in October 1898. He was mustered out in March 1899, and a day later he was appointed postmaster of Lawrence. He was also elected chief of the local fire department after the war. He later became fire commissioner of Cedarhurst, chairman of the executive committee of the Hempstead Volunteer Firemen's Association, and president of the County of Nassau Firemen's Association. He was also a member of the board of directors of the Hewlett-Woodmere Bank.

McWhinney was postmaster of Lawrence until 1913, and by 1915 he was chief of the Lawrence-Cedarhurst Fire Department. In 1914, he was elected to the New York State Assembly as a Republican, representing Nassau County. He served in the Assembly in 1915, 1916, 1917, 1918, 1919, 1920, 1921, 1922, and 1923. In 1917, Governor Whitman appointed him to a committee of seven to take charge of home defense and increase agricultural production. While in the Assembly, he passed bills that made Long Beach a city, created the Sunrise Highway and the Jamaica-Rockaway Turnpike, and abolished a pernicious fee system. A number of his bills created a lot of changes in the town, county, and Long Island governments. He was vice-chairman of the Lockwood Committee that investigated the building industry after World War I, although in 1921 he voted against a measure he introduced to extend the committee's powers to investigate banks and the insurance industry, since he believed the committee already had the ability to do this under an amended resolution. A year later, he opposed some of the committee bills, which was denounced by the committee's counsel Samuel Untermyer. Shortly before the 1920 election, he and other Nassau County politicians were indicted on a charge of tipping off gamblers to police raids, a charge for which he was acquitted of shortly afterwards. In 1922, he filed charges against Supreme Court Justice Selah B. Strong, which were later dismissed.

In 1926, Governor Al Smith appointed McWhinney to the Long Island State Park Commission, which he was a member of for the rest of his life. In 1927, he became chairman of the Hempstead Development Commission. In the Long Island State Park Commission, he planned a vast system of Long Island parks and parkways, including Jones Beach. He was a close friend of Robert Moses.

== Personal life ==
In 1894, he married Lidie Wright Russell. Their children were Florence, Charlotte, and Mary E.

McWhinney attended the Protestant Episcopal Church. He was a member of the Freemasons, the Elks, the Loyal Order of Moose, the Odd Fellows, the Foresters, the Veterans of Foreign Wars, the Inwood Country Club, the Royal Arcanum, the Spanish War Veterans, and the Improved Order of Red Men. He was a founder and president of the Lawrence Country Club.

McWhinney died in his apartment at the Nautilus Beach Club in Atlantic Beach on November 25, 1933. He suffered from a paralytic stroke three weeks beforehand. He was buried in the Trinity Churchyard in Hewlett.

New York State Assembly
Preceded by LeRoy J. Weed	New York State Assembly; Nassau County; 1915–1917	Succeeded by District Abolished
Preceded by District Created	New York State Assembly; Nassau County, 1st District; 1918–1923	Succeeded by Edwin W. Wallace
