= L. Ford Hager =

American politician

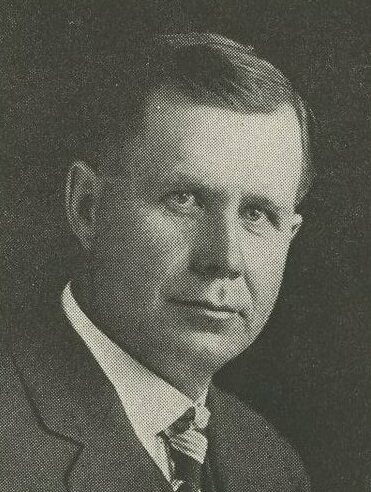

Lewis Ford Hager (October 11, 1877 – February 9, 1932) was an American politician from New York.

== Life ==
Hager was born on October 11, 1877, in Victory, New York. His father, W. A. Hager, was a prominent member of the Democratic Party in the county.

In 1916, Hager was elected to the New York State Assembly as a Republican, representing Cayuga County. He served in the Assembly in 1917, 1918, 1919, 1920, 1921, and 1922. He then worked as a committee clerk for the Assembly. At the time of his death, he was index clerk of the Assembly.

Hager's wife was Jennie. Their children were Mrs. Evan Pietroff and E. Harris. He was a member of the Freemasons.

Hager died in his Albany apartment of a heart attack on February 9, 1932. He was buried in Victory Union Cemetery.

New York State Assembly
Preceded by William F. Whitman	New York State Assembly; Cayuga County; 1917-1922	Succeeded by Sanford G. Lyon
