= Clayton R. Lusk =

American lawyer and politician from New York

- Clayton R. Lusk (photo courtesy of the Cortland County Historical Society)

Member of the New York State Senate from the 40th district
- In office 1919–1924
- Preceded by: Charles J. Hewitt
- Succeeded by: B. Roger Wales

Acting Lieutenant Governor of New York
- In office September 26, 1922 – December 31, 1922
- Governor: Nathan L. Miller
- Preceded by: Jeremiah Wood
- Succeeded by: George R. Lunn

Personal details
- Born: December 21, 1872 Lisle, New York
- Died: February 14, 1959 (aged 86)
- Party: Republican
- Education: Cortland Normal School; Cornell Law School (LL.B.)

Clayton Riley Lusk (December 21, 1872 – February 14, 1959) was an American lawyer and politician from New York. He is now mostly remembered as chairman of the "Lusk Committee", and was the acting lieutenant governor of New York in 1922.

== Biography ==
Lusk was the son of Samuel Lusk and Clara Root Lusk. He graduated from Cortland Normal School in 1895, graduated LL.B. from Cornell Law School, was admitted to the bar in 1902, and practiced law in partnership with Rowland L. Davis in Cortland. Lusk entered politics as a Republican, and was City Judge of Cortland from 1904 to 1909.

He was a member of the New York State Senate (40th D.) from 1919 to 1924, sitting in the 142nd, 143rd, 144th, 145th, 146th and 147th New York State Legislatures. From 1919 to 1920, he chaired the Joint Legislative Committee to Investigate Seditious Activities, which consisted of four senators and five assemblymen and was known popularly as the "Lusk Committee."

Lusk was Temporary President of the State Senate from 1921 to 1922. On September 26, 1922, upon the resignation of Lt. Gov. Jeremiah Wood, who was appointed a judge of the New York Court of Claims, Lusk became Acting Lieutenant Governor until the end of the year serving under Governor Nathan Lewis Miller. He was Minority Leader from 1923 to 1924. At the end of his third term, he came under scrutiny for allegedly having accepted gifts from various companies to support or oppose legislation.

A stadium at the State University of New York at Cortland is named in his honor. He was a member of the Young Men's Debating Club (today the Delphic Fraternity) at the Cortland Normal School.

Clayton R. Lusk was also a member of the Cortland County Bar Association, the Masonic Cortlandville Lodge, and the First Presbyterian Church of Cortland.

== Bibliography ==
- "Clayton R. Lusk, legislator, dies: Former Republican leader of State Senate acted as Governor in 1922" in NYT on February 15, 1959, p. 85.
- Mencken's America by Henry Louis Mencken and S. T. Joshi (Ohio University Press, 2004, ISBN 0-8214-1531-X, ISBN 978-0-8214-1531-3 ; page 221.)
- The Cortland Normal News, Volume 16, No. 4, December 1893, page 21.
- Family Tree Maker's Genealogy Descendants of Daniel Meekes.
- The Cortland Standard, February 16 & 19, 1959.

New York State Senate
Preceded by Charles J. Hewitt	New York State Senate; 40th District; 1919–1924	Succeeded by B. Roger Wales
Political offices
Preceded by J. Henry Walters	Temporary President of the New York State Senate; 1921-1922	Succeeded by Jimmy Walker
Preceded by Jeremiah Wood	Lieutenant Governor of New York; Acting; 1922	Succeeded by George R. Lunn
Preceded by Jimmy Walker	Minority Leader in the New York State Senate; 1923-1924	Succeeded by Jimmy Walker
