= Caesar B. F. Barra =

Italian-American lawyer and politician

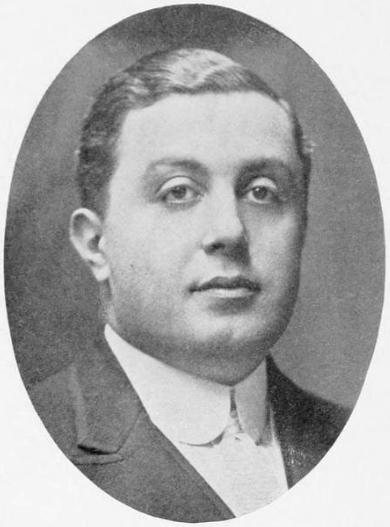

Member of the New York State Assembly
- In office 1918–1920
- Constituency: 2nd District

Member of the New York State Assembly
- In office 1916–1917
- Constituency: 3rd District

Personal details
- Born: February 3, 1880 Salerno, Italy
- Died: September 29, 1949 (aged 69) Brooklyn, New York, US
- Resting place: Calvary Cemetery
- Party: Democratic
- Spouse: Rose M. Struzzieri
- Children: 1
- Education: College of the City of New York; New York University Law School
- Occupation: Lawyer, politician

Caesar B. F. Barra (February 3, 1880 – September 29, 1949) was an Italian-American lawyer and politician from New York.

== Life ==
Barra was born on February 3, 1880, in Salerno, Italy. He immigrated to America with his mother when he was seven.

Barra attended the College of the City of New York and New York University Law School. He was admitted to the bar in 1901 and practiced law with Ambrose H. Purdy and James A. Delehanty, who by 1916 was Judge of the Court of General Sessions in New York County. Barra later practiced law with his brother Ralph J. in 15 Park Row. Over the years, he defended over 200 people tried of murder and was first counsel for Alvin J. Paris after he was accused of bribing the New York Giants in 1946.

In 1915, Barra was elected to the New York State Assembly as a Democrat, representing the New York County 3rd District. He served in the Assembly in 1916, 1917, 1918, 1919, and 1920.

Barra was president of the Criminal Courts Bar Association and a member of the Grand Street Boys Association. He was married to Rose M. Struzzieri. They had a daughter, Mrs. Estelle Favazza.

Barra died at his home in Brooklyn on September 29, 1949. He was buried in Calvary Cemetery.

New York State Assembly
Preceded by Carmine J. Marasco	New York State Assembly; New York County, 3rd District; 1916–1917	Succeeded by Peter P. McElligott
Preceded by Peter J. Hamill	New York State Assembly; New York County, 2nd District; 1918–1920	Succeeded by Frank R. Galgano
