= H. Edmund Machold =

American politician

Henry Edmund Machold (July 5, 1880 – February 6, 1967) was an American lawyer, businessman and politician.

== Life ==
Machold was born in Amsterdam, New York to P. Bernhard Machold and Margaret Mellmen Machold. He attended Albany Law School and read law in Amsterdam. During the Spanish–American War he served in the New York State Militia. He began operating a dairy farm in Ellisburg, New York, in 1900. He married Jennie Ward, and they had twins, Earl and Doris. He also engaged in banking from 1919 on, eventually becoming president of the Northern New York Trust Company.

He was a member of the New York State Assembly in 1912, 1913, 1914, 1915, 1916, 1917, 1918, 1919, 1920, 1921, 1922, 1923 and 1924; and was Speaker from 1921 to 1924. As Speaker, he advocated lowering taxes and successfully opposed Governor Al Smith's attempts to reorganize the state bureaucracy.

He was a delegate to the Republican National Convention in 1924 and 1932. He was Chairman of the New York Republican State Committee in 1928 and 1929, campaigning for Herbert Hoover.

He was vice-president of the St. Regis Paper Company and the Niagara Mohawk Power Company (1932–1950). In 1934, he was accused of trying to influence state legislation concerning utilities.

He was a presidential elector in 1952 and 1956, voting both times for Dwight D. Eisenhower and Richard Nixon.

He was buried at Ellisburg Cemetery in Ellisburg, N.Y.

== Sources ==
- Edmund Machold, Utilities Aide and ex-G.O.P. Leader, Is Dead in NYT on February 8, 1967
- Bio
- New York Times: Election to his first term as Speaker, in NYT on January 6, 1921
- Machold ancestry, at Schenectady history

New York State Assembly
| Preceded by Lewis W. Day | New York State Assembly; Jefferson County, 1st District; 1912–1917 | Succeeded by district abolished |
| Preceded by new district | New York State Assembly; Jefferson County; 1918–1924 | Succeeded by Jasper W. Cornaire |
Political offices
| Preceded by Thaddeus C. Sweet | Speaker of the New York State Assembly; 1921–1924 | Succeeded by Joseph A. McGinnies |
Party political offices
| Preceded by George K. Morris | Chairman of the New York Republican State Committee; 1928–1929 | Succeeded by William J. Maier |
