= William Duke Jr. =

American lawyer and politician

William Duke Jr. (April 11, 1883 – July 20, 1956) was an American lawyer, businessman, and politician from New York. He served in the New York State Assembly as a Republican.

== Early life ==
Duke was born on April 11, 1883, in Scio, New York, the son of William Duke Sr. He graduated from Wellsville High School in 1900, Phillips Exeter Academy in Andover, Massachusetts, in 1902, and Cornell Law School in 1905. While at Cornell, he was a member of Delta Chi.

== Career ==
While Duke was admitted to the bar in 1905, he initially worked in business. He was a manager of Oak Duke Lumber Company in Wellsville, a director of the Wellsville First National Bank, a director of the Wellsville Upholstering Company, and a director of the Wellsville Business Men's Association.

In 1915, Duke was elected to the New York State Assembly as a Republican, representing Allegany County. He served in the Assembly in 1916, 1917, 1918, 1919, 1920, 1921, 1922, and 1923.

In 1918, Duke became a practicing attorney. He served as Village Attorney from 1929 to 1943, when he was named second director of the Pari-mutuel Revenue by the New York State Department of Taxation and Finance. He also served as a justice of the peace.

== Personal life ==
In 1909, Duke married Ruby Clary. Their children were William, George L., and John. He was a member of the Methodist Church and a Freemason.

Duke died at Jones Memorial Hospital on July 20, 1956. He was buried in Woodlawn Cemetery.

New York State Assembly
Preceded by Elmer E. Ferry	New York State Assembly; Allegany County; 1916-1923	Succeeded by Cassius Congdon
