= Samuel J. Ramsperger =

American politician

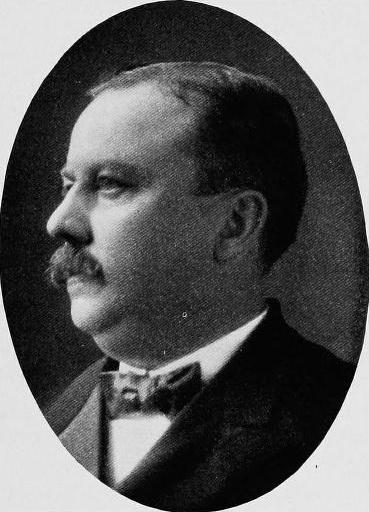
Samuel J. Ramsperger (1908)

Samuel J. Ramsperger (April 25, 1862 – December 15, 1936) was an American politician from New York.

== Life ==
Born in Buffalo, New York, he was the son of Conrad Ramsperger (1831–1869), a nailsmith who died in a work accident, and Anna Maria (Reppert) Ramsperger. He attended St. Anne's Parochial School and Canisius College. Then he became a bookkeeper. He was an alderman of Buffalo from 1885 to 1888. On November 20, 1889, he married Anna Siebert.

Ramsperger was a member of the New York State Senate (48th D.) from 1899 to 1904, sitting in the 122nd, 123rd, 124th, 125th, 126th and 127th New York State Legislatures.

He was again a member of the State Senate (49th D.) from 1907 to 1920, sitting in the 130th, 131st, 132nd, 133rd, 134th, 135th, 136th, 137th, 138th, 139th, 140th, 141st, 142nd and 143rd New York State Legislatures.

He died on December 15, 1936, "after an illness of three months", and was buried at the United German and French Roman Catholic Cemetery in Cheektowaga, New York.

== Sources ==
- Official New York from Cleveland to Hughes by Charles Elliott Fitch (Hurd Publishing Co., New York and Buffalo, 1911, Vol. IV; pg. 365ff)
- Bio transcribed from Our County and Its People: A Descriptive Work on Erie County, New York by Truman C. White (1898)
- Memorial and Family History of Erie County, New York (Vol. II, 1906–08; pg. 5ff)
- SAMUEL J. RAMSPERGER in NYT on December 16, 1936 (subscription required)

New York State Senate
| Preceded by Simon Seibert | New York State Senate; 48th District; 1899–1904 | Succeeded by Louis Fechter, Sr. |
| Preceded by George Allen Davis | New York State Senate; 49th District; 1907–1920 | Succeeded by William E. Martin |
