= Elizabeth V. Gillette =

American physician and politician

Elizabeth Van Rensselaer Gillette (October 21, 1874 in Granby, Hartford County, Connecticut – June 26, 1965 in Schenectady, New York) was an American physician and politician from New York.

== Life ==
She was the daughter of Albert H. Gillette (born 1839) and Mary P. (Jewett) Gillette (born 1851). She studied medicine at the New York Medical College and Hospital for Women, was licensed in 1899, and began the practice of medicine in 1900 in Schenectady.

Gillette was a member of the New York State Assembly (Schenectady Co., 2nd D.) in 1920. She was the first woman elected to the Assembly in upstate New York. She voted against the expulsion of the five Socialist members. In November 1920, she was defeated for re-election and continued the practice of medicine in Schenectady until 1959.

She died on June 26, 1965, at her home at 254 Union Street in Schenectady, New York; and was buried at the Granby Cemetery in Granby, Connecticut.

== Sources ==
- "Democrats Lose 18 Assemblymen" (PDF). The New York Times. November 6, 1919.
- "Oust 5 Socialists; Will Compel Party to Purge Itself" (PDF). The New York Times. April 2, 1920.
- "Dr. Elizabeth Gillette, 90, In State Assembly in 1919 (sic)". The New York Times. June 28, 1965.

New York State Assembly
Preceded by A. Edgar Davies	New York State Assembly; Schenectady County, 2nd District; 1920	Succeeded by William W. Campbell
