= LeRoy J. Weed =

American Book Publisher and Politician

LeRoy Jefferson Weed (March 7, 1878 – June 8, 1961) was an American book publisher and politician from New York.

== Life ==
He was born on March 7, 1878, on a farm in Ithaca, Tompkins County, New York. The family moved to Binghamton where he attended school. He graduated from Union College in 1901. In 1904, he began to work for Ginn and Company, a New York City school-book publishing house, and became a partner of in 1918. He married Mabel Scott, and they had two children: Jefferson Weed (born 1907) and Edith Scott (Weed) Schneider. They lived in Garden City.

In November 1913, Weed was elected as a Progressive, with Democratic and Independence League endorsement, to the New York State Assembly (Nassau Co.), and was a member of the 137th New York State Legislature in 1914. In November 1914, he ran for the New York State Senate (1st D.) but was defeated by Republican George L. Thompson.

He was a trustee of Union College from 1933 to 1961. He was a trustee of Hofstra College from 1944 to 1961, and was chairman of the board of trustees from 1955 to 1959. He was president of Psi Upsilon from 1950 to 1957.

He died on June 8, 1961.

New York State Assembly
Preceded by Thomas B. Maloney	New York State Assembly; Nassau County; 1914	Succeeded by Thomas A. McWhinney
