= Daniel P. Witter =

American politician

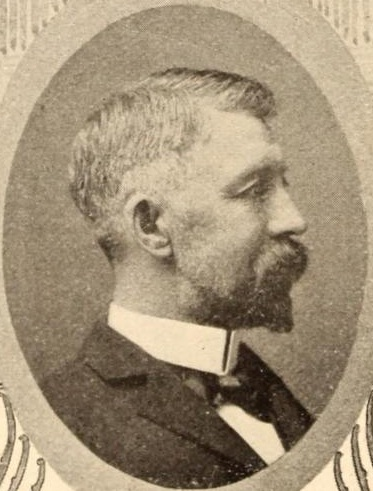
- Daniel P. Witter (1900)

Member of the New York State Assembly from the Tioga County district
- In office 1896–1900
- Preceded by: Epenetus Howe
- Succeeded by: Edwin S. Hanford
- In office 1916–1929
- Preceded by: Wilson S. Moore
- Succeeded by: Frank G. Miller

Personal details
- Born: July 2, 1852 Richford, Tioga County, New York, U.S.
- Died: January 9, 1930 (aged 77) Berkshire, New York, U.S.
- Spouse: Sarah M. Belden

Daniel Parrish Witter (July 2, 1852 – January 9, 1930) was an American farmer and politician from New York.

== Life ==
Daniel Witter was born on July 2, 1852, on a farm in Richford, Tioga County, New York, the son of Asa Witter (1798–1884) and Delia (Torrey) Witter (1819–1909).He attended the common schools, and then worked on the family farm. On March 3, 1876, he married Sarah M. Belden (1857-1937), and they had two children.)

Witter was a member, and sometimes President, of several dairymen's and farmers' associations. He was Supervisor of the Town of Richford from 1891 to 1893.

Witter was a member of the New York State Assembly (Tioga Co.) in 1896, 1897, 1898, 1899 and 1900; and was Chairman of the Committee on Electricity, Gas and Water Supply in 1900.

He was again a member of the State Assembly in 1916, 1917, 1918, 1919, 1920, 1921, 1922, 1923, 1924, 1925, 1926, 1927, 1928 and 1929; and was Chairman of the Committee on Agriculture from 1918 to 1929.

Witter died on January 9, 1930, at his home in Berkshire, New York; and was buried at the Evergreen Cemetery there.

The Daniel Parrish Witter Agricultural Museum, located on the grounds of the Great New York State Fair, was named in his honor.

== Sources ==
New York State Assembly
Preceded by Epenetus Howe	New York State Assembly; Tioga County; 1896–1900	Succeeded by Edwin S. Hanford
Preceded by Wilson S. Moore	New York State Assembly; Tioga County; 1916–1929	Succeeded by Frank G. Miller
