= Clarence C. Smith =

American farmer, politician, and businessman

Clarence Collamer Smith (October 7, 1883 – October 16, 1983) was an American farmer, politician, and businessman from New York.

== Life ==
Smith was born on October 7, 1883, in Wilton, New York, the son of Edgar J. Smith and Mary Ella Collamer.

Smith attended the Wilton district school and graduated from Saratoga Springs High School in 1903. After graduating he worked as a dairy farmer. He became an active member of the Grange, serving as master of the Wilton Grange and secretary of the Saratoga County Pomona Grange Fair. He was also a member and secretary of the Saratoga County Farm Bureau.

In 1914, Smith discontinued his farming to focus on public affairs. In 1925, he became interested in the Farmers Hardware Company, Inc, and a year later he became its manager. The business was housed in the Collamer Building, a large building in Saratoga Springs he had managed since 1911 and where he resided with his family. He retired as part owner of the company in 1946.

In 1907, Smith was appointed deputy town clerk. He was elected town clerk later that year and again in 1909, serving a total of four years. In 1913, he was elected town supervisor of Wilton and served in that office until 1918. In 1918, he was elected to the New York State Assembly as a Republican, representing Saratoga County. He served in the Assembly in 1919, 1920, and 1921.

Smith attended the First Methodist Church. He was a member of the Saratoga Chamber of Commerce since its organization and the Freemasons. In 1913, he married Nora L. Carr. Their three daughters were Dorothy Helen, Ruth Ellen, and Elizabeth Jane.

Smith died on October 16, 1983, 11 days after his 100th birthday. He was buried in Greenridge Cemetery.

New York State Assembly
Preceded by Gilbert T. Seelye	New York State Assembly; Saratoga County; 1919–1921	Succeeded by Burton D. Esmond
