= Forman E. Whitcomb =

American politician (1866–1945)

Member of the New York State Assembly from the Broome County, 2nd district
- In office 1918–1932
- Preceded by: district created
- Succeeded by: Martin W. Deyo

Personal details
- Born: Forman Elmer Whitcomb; July 24, 1866 Smithboro, New York, U.S.
- Died: April 3, 1945 (aged 78) Tioga Center, New York, U.S.
- Resting place: Smithboro Cemetery
- Party: Republican
- Spouse(s): Marion Josephine Tuthill (m. 1891–1924) Florence Wolcott Brooks (died) Lois C.
- Occupation: Politician; educator

Forman Elmer Whitcomb (July 24, 1866 – April 3, 1945) was an American teacher, principal, and politician from New York.

== Early life ==
Whitcomb was born on July 24, 1866, in Smithboro, New York. He was the son of John Milton Whitcomb, a farmer, and Mary Louisa Richards. Whitcomb attended Owego Free Academy.

== Career ==
He then taught for many years and served as principal of the school in Vestal from 1898 to 1906. He then moved to Endicott, where he worked in the Ideal Factory of the Endicott Johnson Corp. He served as village president of Union and justice of the peace for the town of Union.

In 1917, Whitcomb was elected to the New York State Assembly as a Republican, representing the Broome County 2nd District. He served in the Assembly in 1918, 1919, 1920, 1921, 1922, 1923, 1924, 1925, 1926, 1927, 1928, 1929, 1930, 1931, and 1932.

== Personal life ==
In 1891, Whitcomb married Marion Josephine Tuthill. They had a daughter named Mary Louise. After Marion died in 1924, he married Florence Wolcott Brooks. After Florence died, he married Lois C.

He was a member of the Freemasons, the Independent Order of Odd Fellows, and the Improved Order of Red Men. He was a Methodist.

Whitcomb died at home in Tioga Center on April 3, 1945. He was buried in the Smithboro Cemetery.

New York State Assembly
| Preceded by District Created | New York State Assembly; Broome County, 2nd District; 1918-1932 | Succeeded by Martin W. Deyo |
