= Frank H. Lattin =

American politician

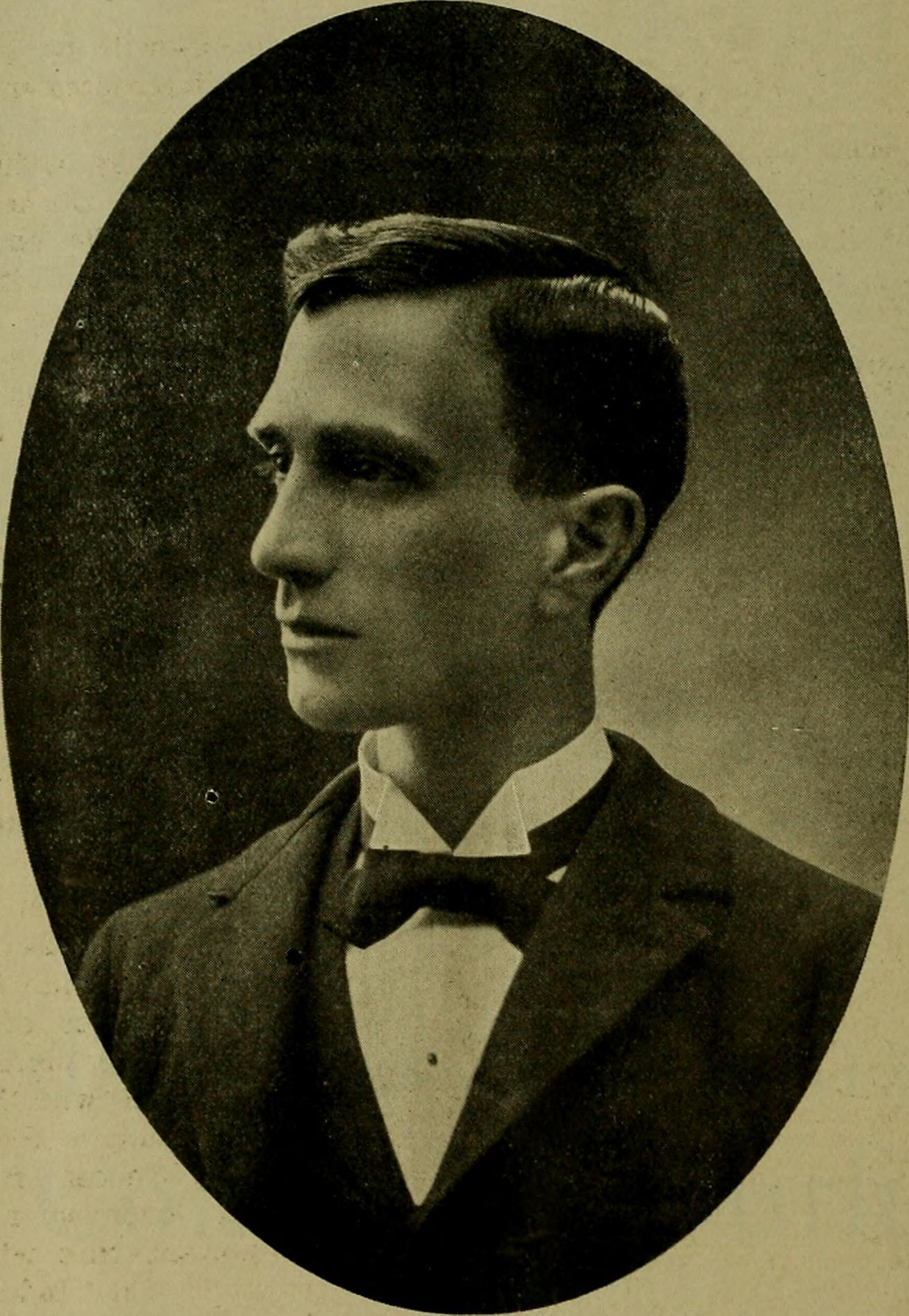
Frank H. Latin Portrait

Frank Haak Lattin (August 17, 1861 – May 23, 1937) was an American physician, naturalist, and politician from New York.

== Life ==
Lattin was born on August 17, 1861, in Gaines, New York, the son of Joseph Wood Lattin and Mary Haak.

Lattin graduated from Albion High School in 1882. He was the principal of the village school in Gaines from 1882 to 1883, and he read law in the office of Signor & Wage in Albion from 1883 to 1884. Between 1881 and 1900, he was a dealer in specimens, instruments, supplies, and publications for naturalists in America. Interested in natural history, he discovered certain parts of Orleans County to be rich in geological products. He made a number of finds and, through correspondence and exchanging with other collectors, developed an extensive natural history collection. He was especially interested in birds' eggs at first, and in 1884 he began publishing a monthly magazine called the "Oologist," which at one point was the official organ of oologists in the county. He came to possess two large warehouses filled with his collections. He placed a large egg collection in the Field Museum in Chicago, and during the 1893 World's Fair the collection occupied 2,000 square feet in the Anthropology Building. After the Fair, he bought the entire shell collection of 50,000 specimens of 10,000 species previously owned by Colonel Jewett of Santa Barbara, California. He published the "Oologist" until 1905, and from 1895 to 1896 he published The Natural Science News, at the time the only American weekly exclusively devoted to natural history.

In 1896, Lattin retired from the natural history business and began studying at the University of Buffalo Medical School. He graduated from there in 1899, after which he worked as a physician and surgeon. He also worked as a fruit grower, with farms in Orleans and Oswego Counties. His farms included over 200 acres of apple orchards and over 50 acres for pears, cherries, peaches, quinces, and plums. His fruit was exhibited in the New York State Fair, and he served as a judge of fruit. He served as coroner of Orleans County from 1910 to 1912.

In 1916, Lattin was elected to the New York State Assembly as a Republican, representing Orleans County. He served in the Assembly in 1917, 1918, 1919, 1920, 1921, 1922, 1923, 1924, 1925, 1926, 1927, 1928, 1929, and 1930.

Lattin was an honorary member of the New York State Pharmaceutical Association and a life member of the New York State Horticultural Society and the New York State Agricultural Society. He was a member of the Orleans County Medical Society, the New York State Medical Society, the Grange, the Odd Fellows, and the Woodman. In 1885, he married May Elida Bullard. Their children were Dorothy May and Virginia B.

Lattin died at home five days after suffering a stroke on May 23, 1937. He was buried in Mount Albion Cemetery.

New York State Assembly
Preceded by A. Allen Comstock	New York State Assembly; Orleans County; 1917–1930	Succeeded by John S. Thompson
