= J. Henry Walters =

American politician

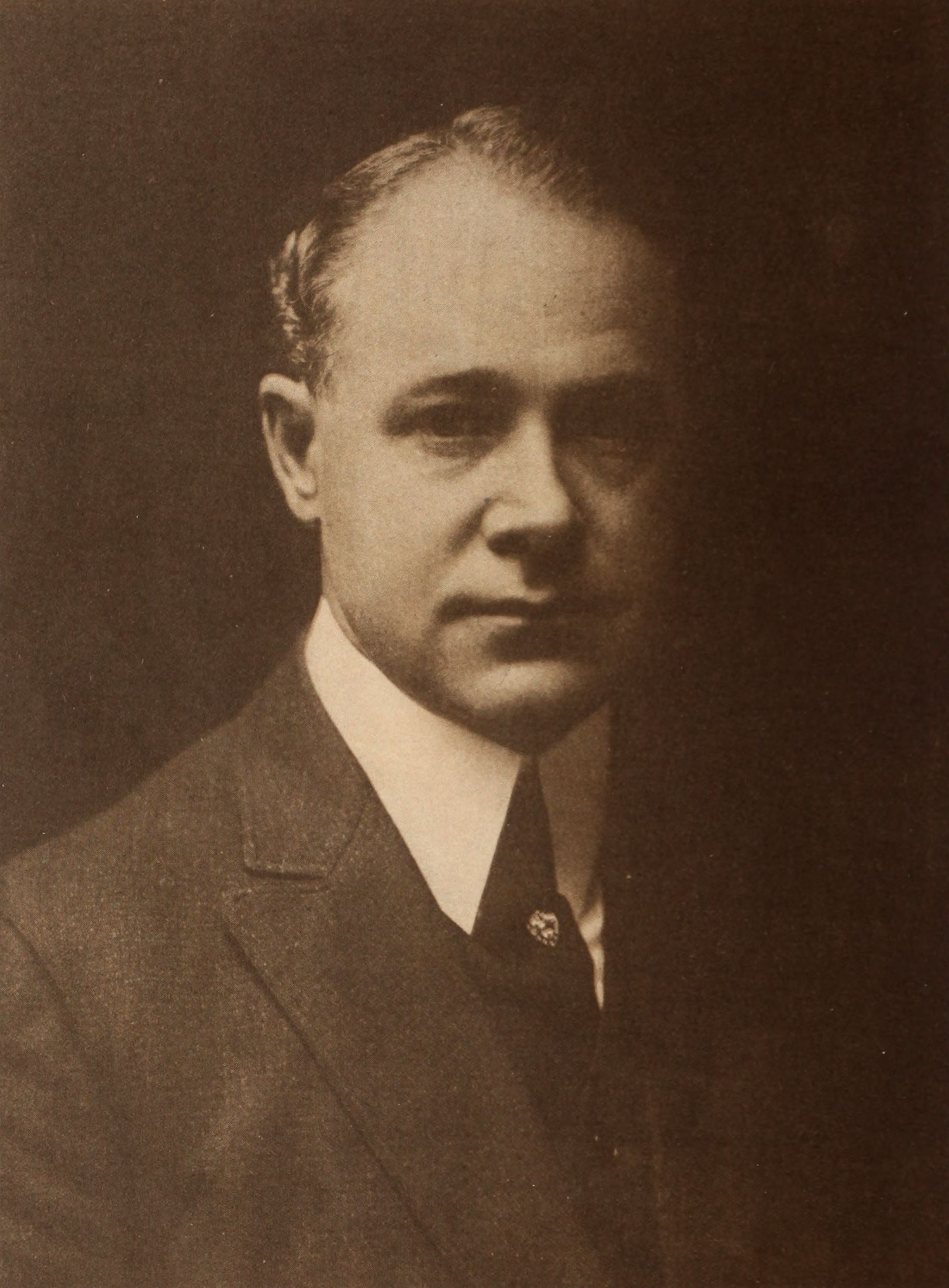
J. Henry Walters

John Henry Walters (January 23, 1874 – January 28, 1952) was an American lawyer and politician. He was President pro tempore of the New York State Senate from 1919 to 1920.

He was born on January 23, 1874, in Syracuse, Onondaga County, New York. He graduated from Syracuse High School in 1890. He was a member of the New York State Assembly (Onondaga Co., 3rd D.) in 1908, 1909 and 1910.

He was a member of the New York State Senate (38th D.) from 1911 to 1920, sitting in the 134th, 135th, 136th, 137th, 138th, 139th, 140th, 141st, 142nd and 143rd New York State Legislatures; and was president pro tempore from 1919 to 1920.

He died on January 28, 1952, in New York City. J. Henry Walters Hall at the State University of New York College of Environmental Science and Forestry, in Syracuse, New York, is named after him.

New York State Assembly
Preceded by George L. Baldwin	New York State Assembly; Onondaga County, 3rd District; 1908–1910	Succeeded by Thomas K. Smith
New York State Senate
Preceded by Hendrick S. Holden	New York State Senate; 38th District; 1911–1920	Succeeded by George R. Fearon
Political offices
Preceded by Elon R. Brown	President pro tempore of the State Senate; 1919–1920	Succeeded by Clayton R. Lusk
