= William Henry Hill (New York politician) =

American politician (1876–1972)

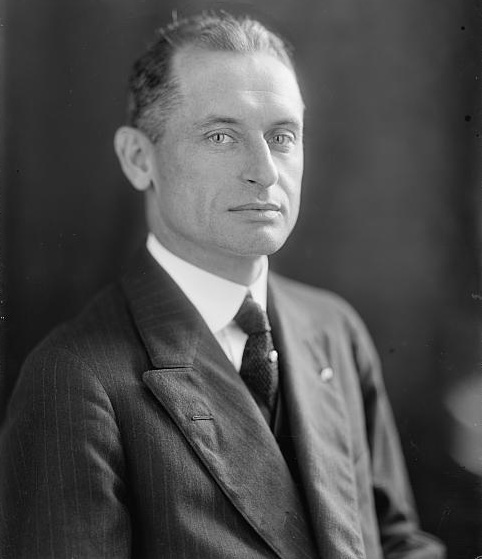

Member of the U.S. House of Representatives from New York's 34th district
- In office March 4, 1919 – March 3, 1921
- Preceded by: George W. Fairchild
- Succeeded by: John D. Clarke

Member of the New York State Senate from the 39th district
- In office January 1, 1915 – December 31, 1918
- Preceded by: Clayton L. Wheeler
- Succeeded by: Adon P. Brown

Mayor of Lestershire, New York
- In office 1898–1901

Personal details
- Born: March 23, 1876 Plains, Pennsylvania, U.S.
- Died: July 24, 1972 (aged 96) Binghamton, New York, U.S.
- Party: Republican
- Education: Hancock High School

William Henry Hill (March 23, 1876 in Plains, Luzerne County, Pennsylvania – July 24, 1972 in Binghamton, Broome County, New York) was an American politician from New York.

== Life ==
Hill graduated from high school at Binghamton, New York. From 1898 to 1921, he was editor and publisher of the Record in the neighboring city of Lestershire (renamed Johnson City in 1916). He was Mayor of Lestershire from 1898 to 1901; and Postmaster of Lestershire from 1902 to 1910.

Hill was a member of the New York State Senate (39th D.) from 1915 to 1918, sitting in the 138th, 139th, 140th and 141st New York State Legislatures.

Hill was elected as a Republican to the 66th United States Congress, holding office from March 4, 1919, to March 3, 1921.

He served as a delegate to the Republican National Conventions in 1924, 1928, 1932, 1940, and 1944. He was appointed as a member of the New York State Parks Commission by Governor Smith in 1925 and elected chairman in 1933. He was Chairman of the New York Hoover-for-President Committee in 1928; Vice Chairman of the Republican Campaign Committee in the East in 1932; a Trustee of Syracuse University; and a member of the Republican executive committee of the State of New York; and continued to publish newspapers until 1960.

He died on July 24, 1972, in Binghamton, New York; and was buried at the Riverhurst Cemetery in Endicott, New York.

== Sources ==
- United States Congress. "William Henry Hill (id: H000610)". Biographical Directory of the United States Congress.

New York State Senate
Preceded by Clayton L. Wheeler	New York State Senate; 39th District; 1915–1918	Succeeded by Adon P. Brown
U.S. House of Representatives
Preceded by George W. Fairchild	Member of the U.S. House of Representatives from New York's 34th congressional district 1919–1921	Succeeded by John D. Clarke
