= Owen M. Kiernan =

American politician

Owen M. Kiernan (1867 – September 14, 1940) was an American politician from New York.

== Life ==
Kiernan was born in 1867 in New York City, New York. He attended the school of Immaculate Conception, a four-year course in the evening high school, and the Cooper Union Literary Class. He worked in the coal and wood industry and the newspaper and advertising business. By 1912, he was an inspector of fuel. He was also a school inspector and the head of an advertising agency that bore his name.

In 1912, Kiernan was elected to the New York State Assembly as a Democrat, representing the New York County 24th District. He served in the Assembly in 1913, 1914, 1915, 1916, 1917, 1918, 1919, 1920, 1921, 1922, 1923, 1924, and 1925. He then worked as second deputy clerk of New York County, leaving the position in 1938.

Kiernan was a member of the Yorkville Chamber of Commerce, the Royal Arcanum, Tammany Hall, and the school associations of the churches of St. Ignatius Loyola and Our Lady of Good Counsel. He was married to Jennie Marsh. Their children were Eugene Clark, Eugenie Anne, Gertrude, and Florence.

Kiernan died in Misericordia Hospital from a four-day illness on September 14, 1940. He was buried in Gate of Heaven Cemetery.

New York State Assembly
Preceded by Thomas A. Brennan	New York State Assembly; New York County, 24th District; 1913–1917	Succeeded by District Abolished
Preceded by Mark Goldberg	New York State Assembly; New York County, 18th District; 1918–1925	Succeeded by Vincent H. Auleta
