= Frank J. Taylor =

American politician

Frank J. Taylor (March 15, 1884 – May 8, 1958) was an American politician from New York.

== Life ==
Taylor was born on March 15, 1884, in the Lower West Side of Manhattan, of Irish-American parentage. His father was Frank J. Barrett. Both of his parents died when he was young, and he was adopted by James and Jane Taylor. He took on their surname. When he was 10, he moved to Brooklyn.

Taylor grew up in Red Hook. He left school when he was 12 and began working as a grocer's helper. He then worked at Robins Dry Dock and Repair Company in Erie Basin as a passer-boy, where he tossed rivets from the fire to the riveter. He rose to be the right-hand man of William H. Todd when the latter became owner of a chain of shipyards.

In 1912, Taylor was elected to the New York State Assembly as a Democrat, representing the Kings County 3rd District. He served in the Assembly in 1913, 1914, 1915, 1916, 1917, 1918, 1919, 1920, 1921, 1922, 1923, 1924, and 1925. In 1925, he was elected Sheriff of Kings County. He served as sheriff from 1926 to 1927. In 1928, he was appointed Commissioner of Records.

In 1930, Taylor was appointed Commissioner of Public Welfare for New York City. He served as Commissioner from 1930 to 1934, during the Great Depression. He established a municipal employment bureau, helped expedite the processing of old-age assistance, and set up the home relief system. In 1933, became chairman of the new city work and relief administration. Homer Folks and Harry Hopkins praised his efforts as Welfare Commissioner. He resigned in 1934, when Fiorello La Guardia became mayor of New York City, and worked for Todd Shipyards as assistant to the president.

In 1934, Taylor was elected New York City Comptroller. He reported the city credit was better in 1935 than at any point in the previous five years, and in 1937 took credit for the city's improved financial condition. He lost his bid for re-election. In 1938, he was appointed a Commissioner of the Port of New York Authority, a post he'd serve for the next ten years, and became president of the American Merchant Marine Institute. He also served as chief negotiator for Eastern shipping operators with sea-going unions for many years, and was chairman of the Merchant Marine Committee of the Whole until he retired in 1952. He was an alternate delegate to the 1928, 1932, 1944, 1948, 1952, and 1956 Democratic National Conventions, and served as a delegate to the 1940 Democratic National Convention.

In 1909, Taylor married Gertrude M. Carmody. He later married Josephine McCarthy. His children were George, an assistant United States Attorney, and William. He was a member of the Montauk Club, the Elks, the Emerald Society, the Catholic Club, the Grand Street Boys, and the National Democratic Club.

Taylor died from a heart condition at home on 27 Prospect Park West on May 8, 1958. He was buried in Holy Cross Cemetery.

New York State Assembly
| Preceded by Michael A. O'Neil | New York State Assembly; Kings County, 3rd District; 1913-1925 | Succeeded by Michael J. Gillen |
Political offices
| Preceded by Joseph McGoldrick | New York City Comptroller; 1936-1937 | Succeeded by Joseph McGoldrick |
