= Gordon H. Peck =

American politician

Gordon H. Peck (1857 – February 18, 1921) was an American manufacturer and politician from New York.

== Life ==
Peck engaged in the manufacture of brick at Haverstraw. Later he also engaged in farming and the real estate business. On February 22, 1908, he married Katherine L. Maqueston (1881–1955).

Peck was a member of the New York State Assembly (Rockland Co.) in 1918, 1919, 1920 and 1921; and was Chairman of the Committee on Charitable and Religious Societies in 1921.

He died on February 18, 1921; and was buried at the Mount Repose Cemetery in Haverstraw.

== Sources ==
- Married; PECK—MAQUESTON in NYT on February 24, 1908
- Assemblyman Gordon H. Peck in NYT on February 19, 1921
- Santa Barbara Cemetery transcriptions; "PECK, Katherine Maquiston"

New York State Assembly
Preceded by William A. Serven	New York State Assembly; Rockland County; 1918–1921	Succeeded by Pierre H. DePew
