= Joseph A. McGinnies =

American politician

Joseph Albert McGinnies (November 7, 1861 County Down, Ireland - 1945) was an American businessman and politician.

== Life ==
He was the son of William McGinnies and Elizabeth Lighthouse McGinnies. William McGinnies emigrated to the United States and settled in Ripley, New York. After he had arranged a home, his wife came with the rest of the family in 1864 to join him.

At the age of sixteen, Joseph McGinnies began working at the drugstore of Dr. Simons in the village of Ripley, learning the pharmacist's profession, and after five years as a clerk in the store he became its proprietor. He developed the establishment into a prospering general store. Then he began to purchase fruit farms, principally those adaptable to grape-growing. He first had his own small farm to look after, and from time to time he was appointed administrator of estates in the grape belt, becoming one of the most expert grape-growers in the region.

On May 3, 1885, he married Agnes Brockway (1862–1954). They had one daughter, Clara Elizabeth, who studied at Syracuse University, from which she was graduated Bachelor of Arts. In 1919, Clara Elizabeth McGinnies married Park J. Johnson, the postmaster of Ripley.

About 1897, he began organizing the Chautauqua and Erie Grape Growers' Association, based in Westfield, New York, of which he was for many a director, secretary-treasurer and manager. Afterwards, he was chosen a director of the First National Bank of Ripley and of the Dunkirk Trust Company of Dunkirk, New York

He entered politics as a Democrat and accepted the nomination to run for the New York State Assembly, but was narrowly defeated. In 1896, he was elected a member of the Chautauqua County Board of Supervisors and was re-elected continuously. In 1905, he changed parties, and became a Republican, but continued to be re-elected to the County Board of Supervisors annually for more than 20 years. From 1906 on, he was Clerk of the Board.

He was a member of the New York State Assembly (Chautauqua Co., 2nd D.) in 1916, 1917, 1918, 1919, 1920, 1921, 1922, 1923, 1924, 1925, 1926, 1927, 1928, 1929, 1930, 1931, 1932, 1933, 1934 and 1935; and was Speaker from 1925 to 1934.

He was an alternate delegate to the 1924 Republican National Convention; and a delegate in 1928 and 1932.

He was a member of the First Presbyterian Church of Ripley.

== Sources ==
- The History of New York State at www.usgennet.org James Sullivan, editor: The History of New York State - Biographies, Part 43 (Lewis Historical Publishing Company, 1927)
- Wife of Late Joseph McGinnies Taken by Death, at RootsWeb

New York State Assembly
Preceded by John Leo Sullivan	New York State Assembly; Chautauqua County, 2nd District; 1916–1935	Succeeded by Carl E. Darling
Political offices
Preceded by H. Edmund Machold	Speaker of the New York State Assembly; 1925–1934	Succeeded by Irwin Steingut
