= George T. Burling =

American politician (1849–1928)

George G. Taylor Burling (February 16, 1849 in Harrison, Westchester County, New York – July 29, 1928 in Bronxville, Westchester Co., NY) was an American banker and politician from New York.

== Life ==
He was the son of John Burling (1807–1870) and Adaline F. (Taylor) Burling (1808–1883). He attended the district school, the Willets private school, Brooklyn Polytechnic Institute, and also took a business course at Bryant and Stratton Business College. On December 25, 1867, he married Mary H. Lane (1848–1881), and they had four daughters. He engaged in the grocery feed and grain business in Brooklyn from 1869 to 1871. He was Supervisor of the Town of Harrison from 1878 to 1886. On October 2, 1883, he married Clara B. Sutton (1862–1928), and they had four children.

Later he engaged in the grain business again, continued active in Republican politics, and in 1907 became the first President of the Citizens Bank of White Plains.

He was Treasurer of Westchester County from 1909 to 1914; and a member of the New York State Senate (25th D.) from 1919 to 1922, sitting in the 142nd, 143rd, 144th and 145th New York State Legislatures.

He died on July 29, 1928, at his home in the Gramatan Hotel in Bronxville, New York; and was buried at the Friends Cemetery in Purchase, New York.

== Sources ==
- New York Red Book (1922; pg. 72)
- TEN DEMOCRATS, TEN REPUBLICANS in NYT on April 2, 1896
- WESTCHESTER IS REPUBLICAN in NYT on November 8, 1911
- GEORGE TAYLOR BURLING in NYT on July 31, 1928 (subscription required)
- The Burling Books (pg. 363 and 536ff)

New York State Senate
Preceded by John D. Stivers	New York State Senate; 25th District; 1919–1922	Succeeded by William W. Westall
