= Frank F. Adel =

American lawyer, politician, and judge

Frank Fred Adel (October 11, 1884 – February 13, 1967) was an American lawyer, politician, and judge from New York.

== Life ==
Adel was born on October 11, 1884, in New York City, New York, the son of cooper Jacob Adel and Margaret Ries.

Adel graduated from St. Lawrence University with an LL.B. in 1903. He was admitted to the state bar in 1904, at which point he opened a law office in Ridgewood and practiced law there. He was a member of the advisory board of the Manhattan Company and a trustee of the Savings Bank of Ridgewood. In 1921, he was one of the 14 people who organized the latter bank, and he was an active director until his death.

Adel was assistant District Attorney of Queens County from 1912 to 1917. In 1918, he was elected to the New York State Senate as a Democrat, representing New York's 2nd State Senate district (part of Queens). He served in the Senate in 1919.

In 1925, Governor Al Smith appointed Adel county judge of Queens County. As judge, he was involved in the trial of the Cry Baby Bandits. In 1930, he was elected to the New York Supreme Court. In 1940, Governor Herbert Lehman appointed him to the New York Supreme Court, Appellate Division, Second Department. While serving there, he ruled on cases related to fixing of milk prices and bribes taken by city officials. He retired from the bench in 1954. In 1956, the Suffolk County justices of the peace appointed him to serve as a special referee in an investigation of charges of ticket fixing.

Adel attended the Lutheran Church. He was a member of the American Bar Association, the New York State Bar Association, the Queens County Bar Association, the Freemasons, the Shriners, the Scottish Rite, the Elks, and the Loyal Order of Moose. In 1905, he married Alice M. Meyerrose. They had a daughter, Ruth M.

Adel died at his home in Manhasset, where he lived for the last 18 years of his life, on February 13, 1967. He was buried in Mount Olivet Cemetery in Maspeth, Queens.

New York State Senate
Preceded by August E. Farrenkopf	New York State Senate; 2nd District; 1919	Succeeded by John L. Karle
