= William G. Carroll =

American politician

William Goff Carroll (June 16, 1893 – February 11, 1969) was an American politician from Bayport, New York.

== Biography ==
Carroll was born on June 16, 1893 in Brooklyn, New York.

Carroll attended Brooklyn public schools, the Polytechnic Preparatory School, and St. John's College. He moved to Bayport in 1908 and worked in real estate. During World War I, he served in the United States Army with the Tank Corps for 13 months. He served overseas and was selected by an educational program the Army implemented after the Armistice to study international law at the University of Paris. In 1919, not long after his honorable discharge, he was elected to the New York State Assembly as a Democrat in the Suffolk County 2nd District. He served in the Assembly in 1920.

In 1920, he was the Democratic candidate for the New York State Senate in New York's 1st State Senate district. He lost the election to Republican George L. Thompson. In 1956, he was appointed assistant to State Superintendent of Insurance Leffert Holtz. He resigned 9 months later. During the 1956 Democratic Party presidential primaries, he supported W. Averell Harriman and unsuccessfully ran as a delegate to the 1956 Democratic National Convention. He was also a committeeman of the New York State Democratic Party and the Islip Democratic Leader.

In 1927, Carroll married Julia Fitzpatrick. They had one surviving daughter, Mrs. Anne C. Del Castillo.

Carroll died at home on February 11, 1969. A requiem mass was held at Our Lady of the Snow Roman Catholic Church in Blue Point. He was buried in Calvary Cemetery in Brooklyn.

New York State Assembly
Preceded by Ida Sammis	New York State Assembly; Suffolk County, 2nd District; 1920	Succeeded by Paul Bailey
