= 1956 New Jersey Democratic presidential primary =

1956 New Jersey Democratic presidential primaries
- April 17, 1956
- Presidential delegate primary

72 Democratic National Convention delegates (36 delegate votes)

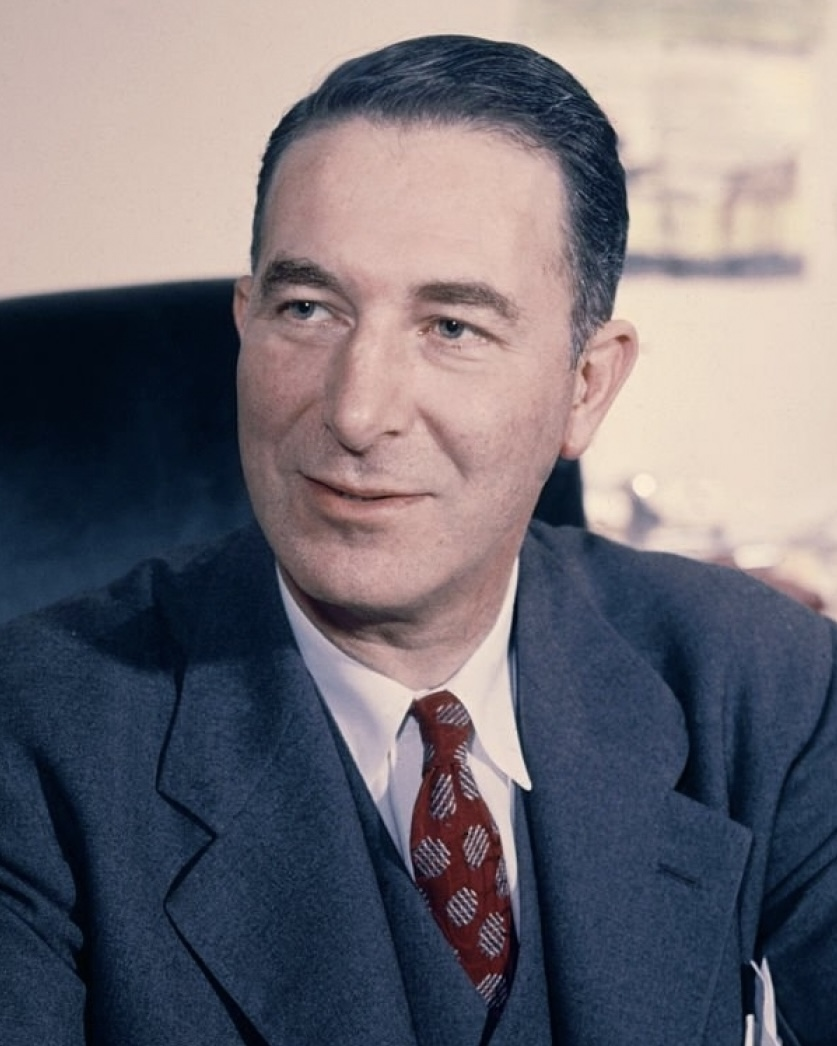
Candidate	Uncommitted (favored Adlai Stevenson II)	Estes Kefauver
Delegate count	71	1
Popular vote	2,989,282	1,232,435
Percentage	70.8%	29.2%
- Presidential preference primary (non-binding)

No Democratic National Convention delegates
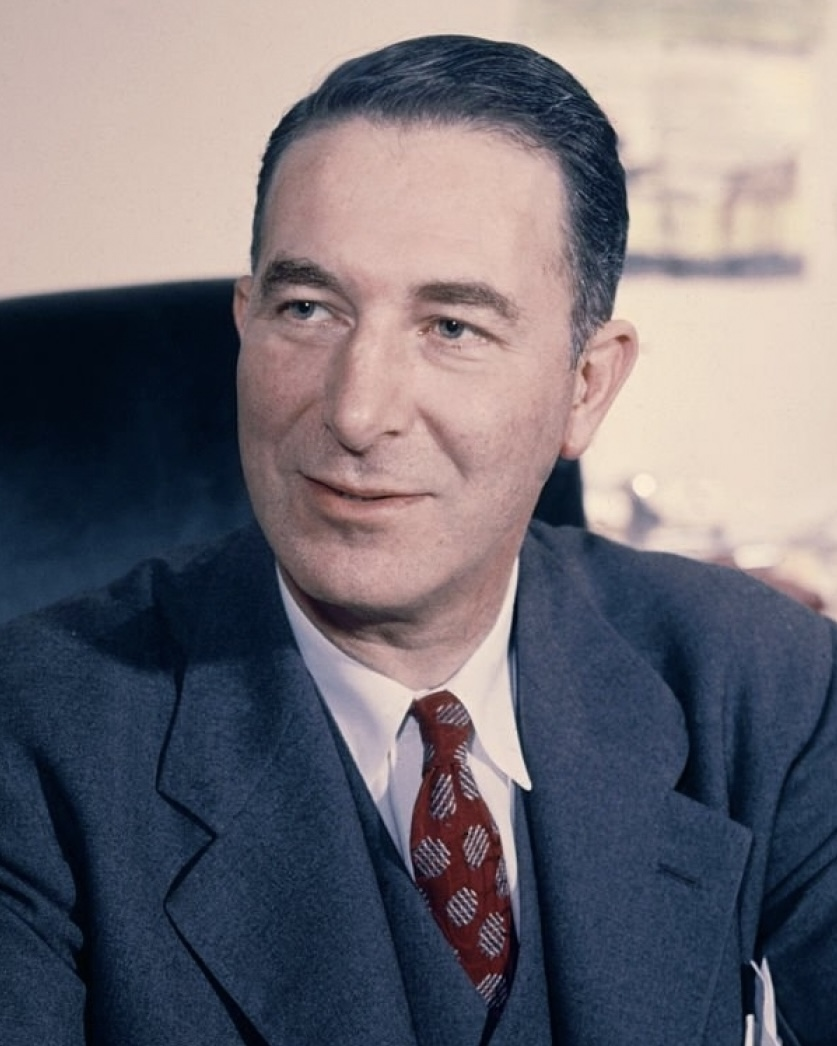

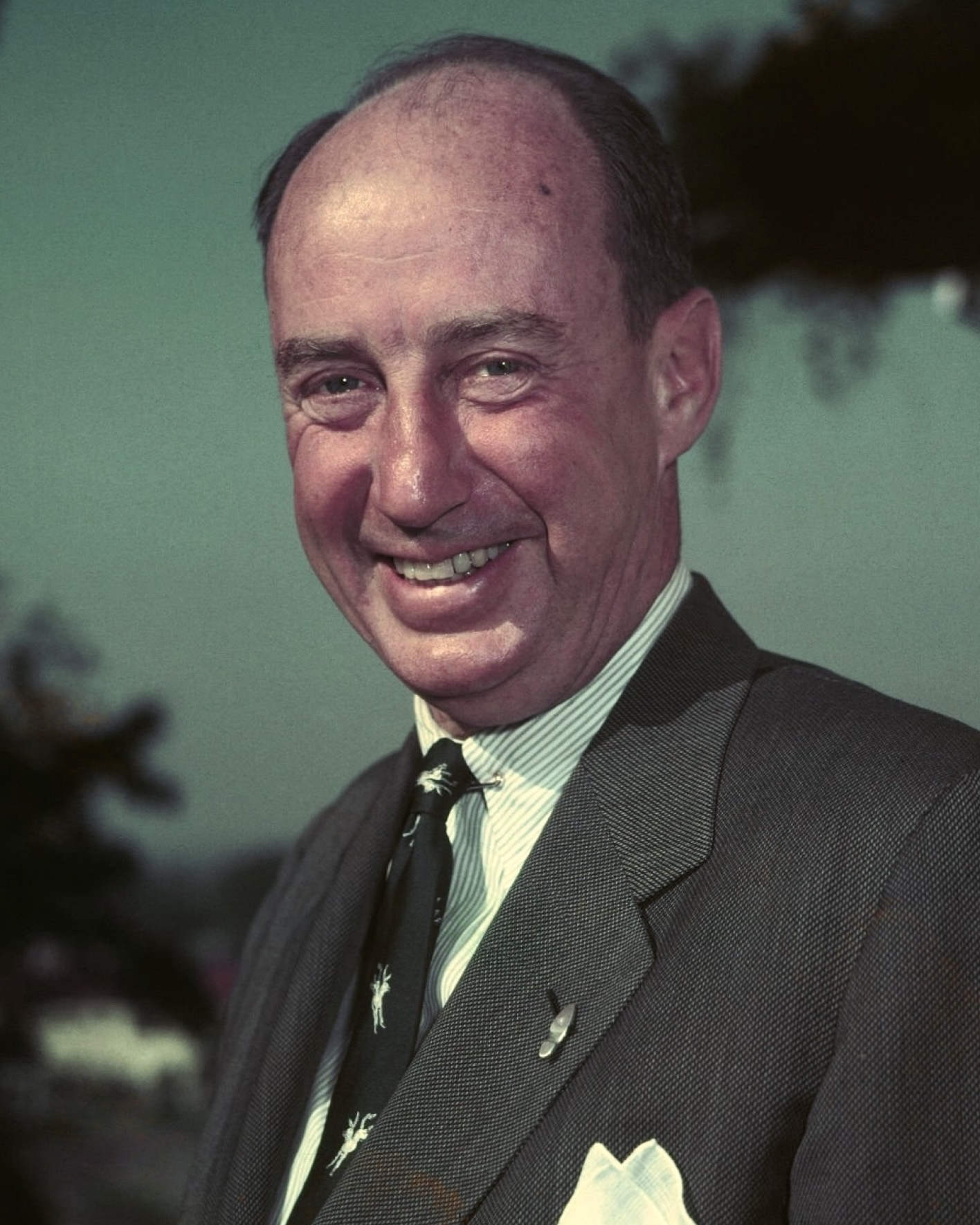
Candidate	Estes Kefauver	Adlai Stevenson II (write-in)
Home state	Tennessee	Illinois
Popular vote	117,056	4,043
Percentage	95.7%	3.3%

The 1956 New Jersey Democratic presidential primary was held on April 21, 1956, in New Jersey as one of the Democratic Party's statewide nomination contests ahead of the 1956 United States presidential election.

In the binding delegate primary, uncommitted delegates selected by party leaders and favoring Adlai Stevenson II were challenged by delegates backing Senator Estes Kefauver of Tennessee. However, only one Kefauver delegate, Irwin Le Wine of Caldwell, was elected.

In the preference primary held at the same time, Kefauver was the only candidate to file to run before the March 8 deadline, and he received an overwhelming majority of the Democratic vote, though significant write-in votes were cast for Adlai Stevenson II and Robert Meyner.

== Background ==
Entering the middle of April, Estes Kefauver was dominating the Democratic primary elections, having swept the New Hampshire primary and won 28 out of 30 delegates in the Minnesota primary. On April 3, he swept all 28 delegates in the Wisconsin primary. As early as the rout in Minnesota, supporters of Adlai Stevenson II had begun re-evaluating their candidate's chances at a second consecutive nomination.

In 1952, Kefauver had been unopposed in the New Jersey preference primary but did not win the support of the state's Democratic convention delegates. In 1956, a group of Kefauver supporters led by Martin J. Rafferty filed to run in the April 17 primary election, challenging the uncommitted slate of delegates led by Governor Robert B. Meyner, which overwhelmingly favored 1952 nominee Adlai Stevenson II. Informed that his delegates would be challenged, Meyner remarked, "I believe we will remain non-committed. The voters will have the choice of our ticket or that pledge to Mr. Kefauver."

As in 1952, Kefauver was the only candidate to file for the preference primary and therefore the only candidate to appear on the ballot.

=== Procedure ===
Sixteen delegates were elected at-large on a statewide ticket, and another four were elected from each of the state's 14 congressional districts. Each delegate would have half a vote at the 1956 Democratic National Convention.

== Campaign ==
Most Democratic leaders were confident that the organization slate would not be beaten. Kefauver scheduled a brief tour of the state, speaking in Princeton and at Rutgers University on April 6 and returning the following week ahead of the April 17 election.

In late March, Meyner's executive secretary, Robert J. Burkhardt, invited Kefauver (through his national campaign manager, F. Joseph Donahue) to hold a joint press conference and share lunch with Meyner, but Donahue declined citing scheduling conflicts. Instead, Kefauver expanded his April 6 visit to five days, scheduling additional rallies in Newark, Lakewood, Nutley, and Monmouth County, as well as further visits to Passaic County industrial plants, South Jersey farmers markets, luncheons in Whippany and Linden, and a cocktail party in Teaneck.

During the primary campaign, Meyner appealed for a vote for his slate as a vote of confidence in his administration as governor.

== Results ==
On election day, the Meyner slate won a large majority of the vote, defeating Kefauver in every district and conceding only one delegate (worth one-half vote), in Essex County. In addition, Kefauver received far fewer votes in the preference primary than Dwight D. Eisenhower, the only other candidate on the ballot. In Princeton, where Stevenson had graduated from the prestigious university and Kefauver made a key campaign stop, Kefauver won by a vote of 176 to 124.

=== Preference primary results ===
1956 New Jersey presidential preference primary
Party	Candidate	Votes	%
Democratic	Estes Kefauver	117,056	95.72%
Democratic	Adlai Stevenson II (write-in)	4,043	3.31%
Democratic	Robert Meyner (write-in)	1,129	0.92%
Democratic	Averell Harriman (write-in)	27	0.02%
Democratic	Stuart Symington (write-in)	15	0.01%
Democratic	Frank Lausche (write-in)	9	0.00%
Democratic	Harry S. Truman (write-in)	6	0.00%
Democratic	Vincent Panaro (write-in)	1	0.00%
Total votes		122,286	100.00%

=== Delegate primary results ===
1956 New Jersey Democratic primary
Delegate slate	Candidate	Delegate candidates		Delegates		Aggregate votes	
Delegate slate	Candidate	State	District	Total	Of total (%)	Total	Of total (%)
Regular Democratic Organization	Uncommitted (favored Adlai Stevenson II)	16	56	71	98.61	2,989,282	70.79
Kefauver	Estes Kefauver	16	56	1	1.39	1,232,435	29.19
Other		0	1	0	0.00	913	0.02
Total		32	113	72	100.0	4,222,630	100.00
Registered voters, and turnout							

==== Delegate primary results by contest ====
1956 New Jersey Democratic primary
Contest	Delegates and popular vote			Total
Contest	Regular Democratic Organization	Kefauver	Other	Total
Delegates at-large	16; 2,404,338 (69.98%)	1,031,599 (30.02%)		3,435,937
1st district	4; 53,675 (75.24%)	45,862 (24.76%)	—N/a	71,337
2nd district	4; 12,926 (59.24%)	7,979 (36.57%)	913 (4.18%) (Note: All votes for Albert J. Cucci of Laurelton.)	21,818
3rd district	4; 43,742 (73.21%)	27,622 (26.79%)	—N/a	59,746
4th district	4; 42,346 (61.17%)	26,884 (38.83%)	—N/a	69,230
5th district	4; 49,364 (80.36%)	12,459 (19.64%)	—N/a	61,432
6th district	4; 37,538 (74.18%)	55,715 (25.82%)	—N/a	50,607
7th district	4; 31,688 (68.64%)	29,098 (31.36%)	—N/a	46,165
8th district	4; 24,471 (76.37%)	14,544 (23.63%)	—N/a	32,043
9th district	4; 37,933 (79.29%)	30,836 (20.71%)	—N/a	47,839
10th district	4; 27,769 (72.86%)	32,238 (27.14%)	—N/a	38,112
11th district	4; 19,395 (69.79%)	21,176 (30.21%)	—N/a	27,792
12th district	3; 17,678 (66.89%)	1; 23,033 (33.11%)	—N/a	26,430
13th district	4; 93,175 (77.79%)	54,633 (22.21%)	—N/a	119,785
14th district	4; 93,244 (81.54%)	56,055 (18.46%)	—N/a	114,357
District subtotal	55 584,944 (74.35%)	1 200,836 (25.53%)	913 (0.12%)	786,693

== Aftermath ==
The New Jersey delegate primary was the first major defeat for Kefauver since he had launched his second campaign for the Democratic nomination. Meyner's victory greatly increased Stevenson's odds of nomination and his own national prestige.

Kefauver withdrew from the race on July 31, ahead of the Democratic National Convention, and Stevenson was nominated at the convention without opposition.
