= Noel B. Fox =

American politician (1878–1972)

Noel Bleecker Fox (March 28, 1878 – June 25, 1972) was an American lawyer and politician from New York.

== Life ==
Fox was born on March 28, 1878, in New York City, New York, the son of Rev. Norman Fox and Jane Byvanck Bleecker. His father was a Baptist minister, chaplain for the 77th New York Infantry Regiment during the American Civil War, and Mayor of Morristown, New Jersey, from 1900 to 1902. He was a direct descendant of Anne Hutchinson and Jan Jansen Bleecker.

Fox graduated from the Lawrenceville Academy in 1895, after which he graduated from Princeton University with an A.B. in 1899. He then went to Columbia University, receiving an M.A. from there in 1901 and then an LL.B. in 1902. He was admitted to the bar in 1902, after which he began practicing law in New York City. He served in the New York National Guard for ten years as an enlisted man in Squadron A, Cavalry, and spent six months serving in the Mexican border in 1916. In May 1917, after America entered World War I, he attended R.O.T.C. in Plattsburgh. In August 1917, he was commissioned a captain of the F.A.N.A. In July 1918, he was promoted to Major of the 57th Field Artillery. He served overseas from April 1918 to September 1918, during which time he fought with the 77th Division in the Vosges and the Vesle. He was discharged in February 1919.

In 1919, Fox was elected to the New York State Assembly as a Republican, representing the New York County 7th District. He served in the Assembly in 1920 and 1921. His grandfather Norman Fox served as assemblyman for four terms starting in 1819. He later moved to Bronxville, spending the last 36 years of his life living there and Yonkers. He was a member of the board of directors of the New York City YMCA from 1943 to 1953.

Fox was a member of the New York County Lawyers' Association, a charter member of the American Legion, commander of the New York Command of the Military Order of the Loyal Legion, and a historian of the Society of Colonial Wars. He was also a member of the New York State Bar Association, the New York City Bar Association, the Princeton Club of New York, the Society of Cincinnati, the Saint Nicholas Society, the Sons of the Revolution, the Society of the War of 1812, and the Colonial Order of the Acorn. He attended the Riverside Church. In 1930, he married Kathryn Blodgett Augur. Their children were Norman, Jane Bleecker, and Kathryn Augur.

Fox died at his home in Yonkers on June 25, 1972. He was buried in Green-Wood Cemetery in Brooklyn.

New York State Assembly
Preceded by Mary Lilly	New York State Assembly; New York County, 7th District; 1920–1921	Succeeded by Victor R. Kaufmann
