= 1956 New Hampshire Democratic presidential primary =

- March 13, 1956
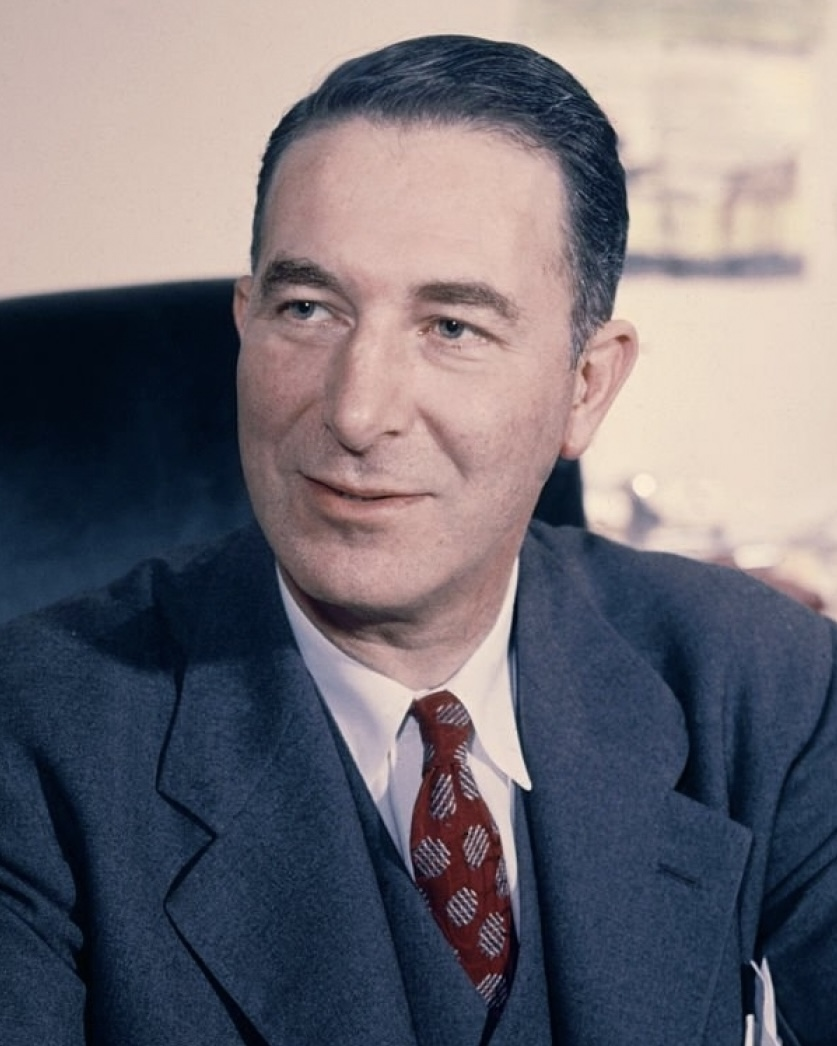

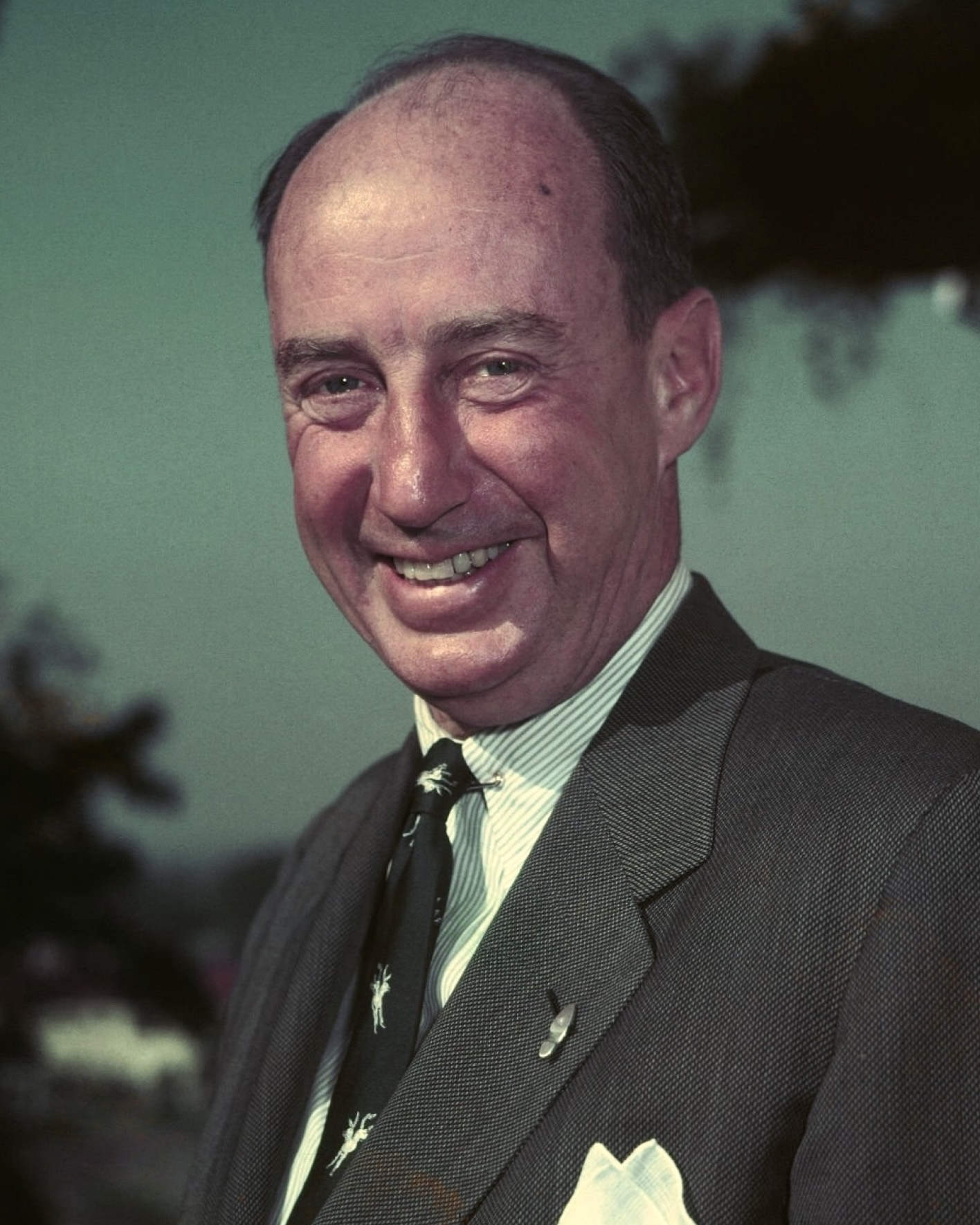
Candidate	Estes Kefauver	Adlai Stevenson II
Home state	Tennessee	Illinois
Popular vote	21,701	3,806
Percentage	84.6%	14.8%
- County results Kefauver

The 1956 New Hampshire Democratic presidential primary was held on March 13, 1956, in New Hampshire as one of the Democratic Party's statewide nomination contests ahead of the 1956 United States presidential election.

== Results ==
Estes Kefauver, a senator from Tennessee and the previous winner of the 1952 New Hampshire primary against incumbent President Truman, defeated eventual 1956 Democratic nominee Adlai Stevenson by nearly 70 percentage points. Kefauver would go on to be Stevenson's running mate in the 1956 election, but the Stevenson-Kefauver ticket lost in a landslide to incumbent Republican President Eisenhower.

New Hampshire Democratic primary, March 13, 1956
Candidate	Votes	Percentage
Estes Kefauver	21,701	84.6%
Adlai Stevenson II	3,806	14.8%
Other write-ins	139	0.6%
