= Mary Lilly =

American politician

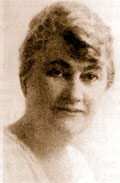
- Born: July 18, 1859; Boston, Massachusetts
- Died: October 11, 1930 (aged 71); Brooklyn, New York
- Education: Hunter College, New York University School of Law
- Occupations: Politician, Social activist
- Spouse: John F. Lilly

Mary Madden Lilly (July 18, 1859, in Roxbury, Massachusetts – October 11, 1930, in Brooklyn, New York) was a Progressive Era activist who had a prominent role in New York City's social reform movements during the last decades of the 19th century and early decades of the 20th century. In particular, Lilly supported prison reform in the form of separate facilities for females who were first time offenders. Lilly was an advocate for women's suffrage and other legislation to better the lives of women and children. After women gained the right to vote in New York in 1917, Lilly ran for elected office in the November 1918 election, and was one of two females elected to serve in the 1919 session of the New York State Assembly.

== Family and early life ==
Mary married John F. Lilly. Mary and John Lilly were the parents of J. Joseph Lilly, an assistant U.S. Attorney for the Southern District of NY.

Lilly graduated from Hunter College teachers' school in 1876 and took a job teaching in the New York City public school system. While still teaching school, she attended New York University School of Law on a full scholarship, reported to be the first grant earned by a woman by taking a competitive exam. In 1895, Lilly was one of ten women in a class of seventy law students to receive her Bachelor of Laws degree.

== Early career ==
=== Public school teacher ===
Lilly graduated from Hunter College teachers school in 1876 when still a teen, and took a job teaching at P.S. 37 in Manhattan. In total, Lilly worked as a public school teacher for thirty-six years until she retired. Lilly joined The Association of Retired Teachers of the City of New York and held the position of secretary.

== Suffragist ==
Attended the Seneca Fall Conference sponsored by the Women's Party to commemorate the Women's Rights Convention of 1848.

== Community civic groups ==
Lilly belonged to and founded civic groups that advocated for social and political reforms. She was a member of The Society for the Aid to Mental Defectives and was the editor of its Journal. She was a Founder of The Knickerbocker Civic League and served as its president.

Additionally, Lilly was member of the political organization, The Women's Democratic Club.

=== New York City Federation of Women's Clubs ===
Lilly was the recording secretary and the Chair of the Probation Committee of the New York City Federation of Woman's Clubs. Through her affiliation with the Federation, in 1913, she worked to establish the Kingsboro House, a detention home for young women first offenders in Brooklyn.

== Later careers ==
=== Law practice ===
Lilly was editor of the Women Lawyers' Journal from 1915 to 1916.

For a brief time Lilly had a joint law practice with Eve P. Radtke who was admitted to bar in 1906.

=== Political career ===
After women gained the right to vote in New York in 1917, she ran at the New York state election, 1918 for the New York State Assembly (New York Co., 7th D.). Along with Ida B. Sammis, Lilly was one of the first two New York assemblywomen, sitting in the 142nd New York State Legislature in 1919.

=== New York State Assemblywoman ===
Lily sponsored a number of bills regarding children. She introduced legislation to establish paternity of children born out of wedlock, to protect the rights for children, and worked to abolish the death penalty.

Late in Lilly's re-election campaign for her seat in the New York State Assembly, The Citizens Union charged that Lilly as an assemblywomen and superintendent of the women prisoners on Blackwell's Island drew two salaries contrary to state law. Lilly answered the charge by asserting that she was assured by her counsel that she had the right to accept a job with the City of New York while employed in a public office with the state.

=== Superintendent of inmates ===
In 1919 Lilly was appointed as the superintendent of female inmates at the Workhouse on Blackwell's Island. By the time that Lilly retired in 1928, she had worked under three Commissioners: James A. Hamilton, Frederick A. Wallis and Richard C. Patterson.

== Later life and death ==
Lilly's residence for many years was Hotel St. Andrew. Lilly died on October 11, 1930, at the home of her son in Brooklyn after a brief illness.

New York State Assembly
Preceded by Abram Ellenbogen	New York State Assembly; New York County, 7th District; 1919	Succeeded by Noel B. Fox
