= Ida Sammis =

American politician (1865–1943)

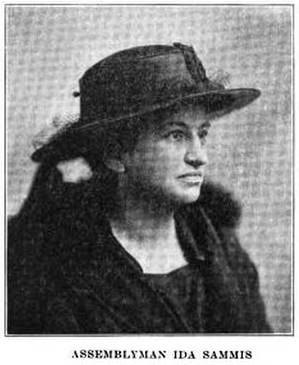
- Ida Sammis, from a 1918 publication.
- Born: Ida Bunce; October 8, 1865; Cold Spring Harbor, New York, U.S.
- Died: June 3, 1943 (aged 77); Ogdensburg, New York, U.S.
- Occupation: Politician
- Known for: One of the first two women elected to the New York State Assembly

Ida Sammis Woodruff Satchwell (née Bunce) (October 8, 1865 – June 3, 1943) was a prominent early female Republican party suffragist and politician from Suffolk County, New York. Sammis was one of the first two women elected to the New York State Legislature.

== Family and early life ==
Ida Sammis was born to Eliphalet and Margaret (Rogers) Bunce on October 8, 1865 in Cold Spring Harbor, Long Island, New York.

She married a merchant, Edgar A. Sammis, who died in a car accident in 1917. Ida and Edgar had one son together.

== Political career ==
In 1911, Sammis organized the first women's suffrage club in Suffolk County.

After women gained the right to vote in New York in 1917, Sammis ran at the New York state election, 1918 for the New York State Assembly (Suffolk Co., 2nd D.). Along with Mary Lilly, Sammis was one of the first two New York assemblywomen, sitting in the 142nd New York State Legislature in 1919.

According to contemporary news accounts, including in the New York World, Sammis' first act as a legislator was to remove the brass spittoon assigned to her, polish it to a brilliant shine, and place it on her desk as a vase filled with flowers.

Sammis primarily concerned herself with legislation affecting her Assembly district. During Sammis' first year in the Assembly, ten of fourteen bills that she introduced were passed.

Sammis introduced a bill "prohibiting the employment of women under 21 as elevator conductors; and forbidding adult women to be employed as elevator conductors more than 54 hours a week, or before 7 A. M., or after 10 P. M. The bill also required that seats must be provided for all women conductors in elevators."

Sammis continued to be active in community organizations following her single term.

== Later life and death ==
Her second husband was Alden J. Woodruff, a retired doctor from Babylon, New York whom she married in January 1923. After the death of Woodruff she married a third time, to George E. Satchwell.

Ida Satchwell died June 3, 1943.

New York State Assembly
Preceded by Henry A. Murphy	New York State Assembly; Suffolk County, 2nd District; 1919	Succeeded by William G. Carroll
