= 1956 Democratic Party presidential primaries =

Selection of the Democratic Party nominee

- March 11 to June 5, 1956
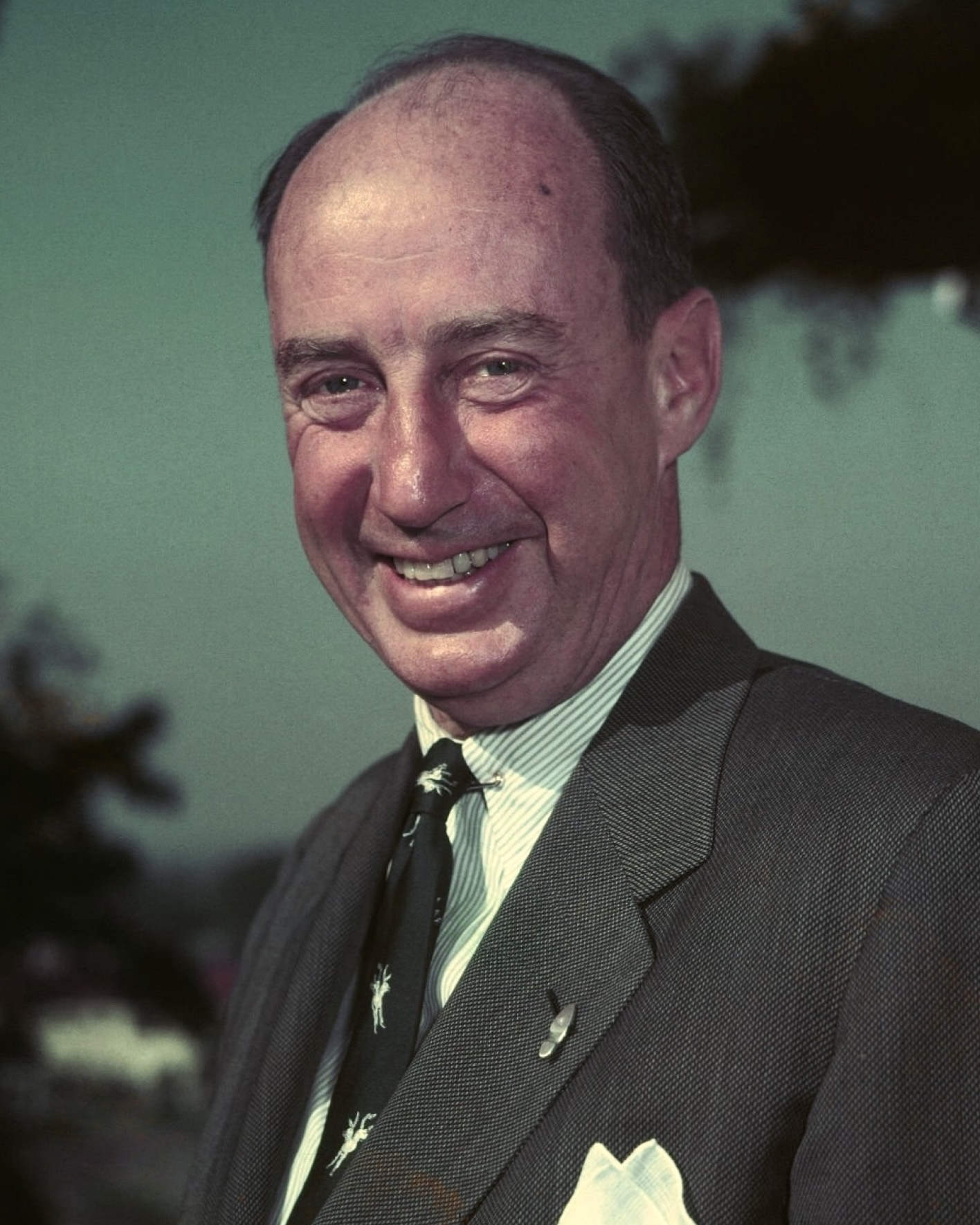

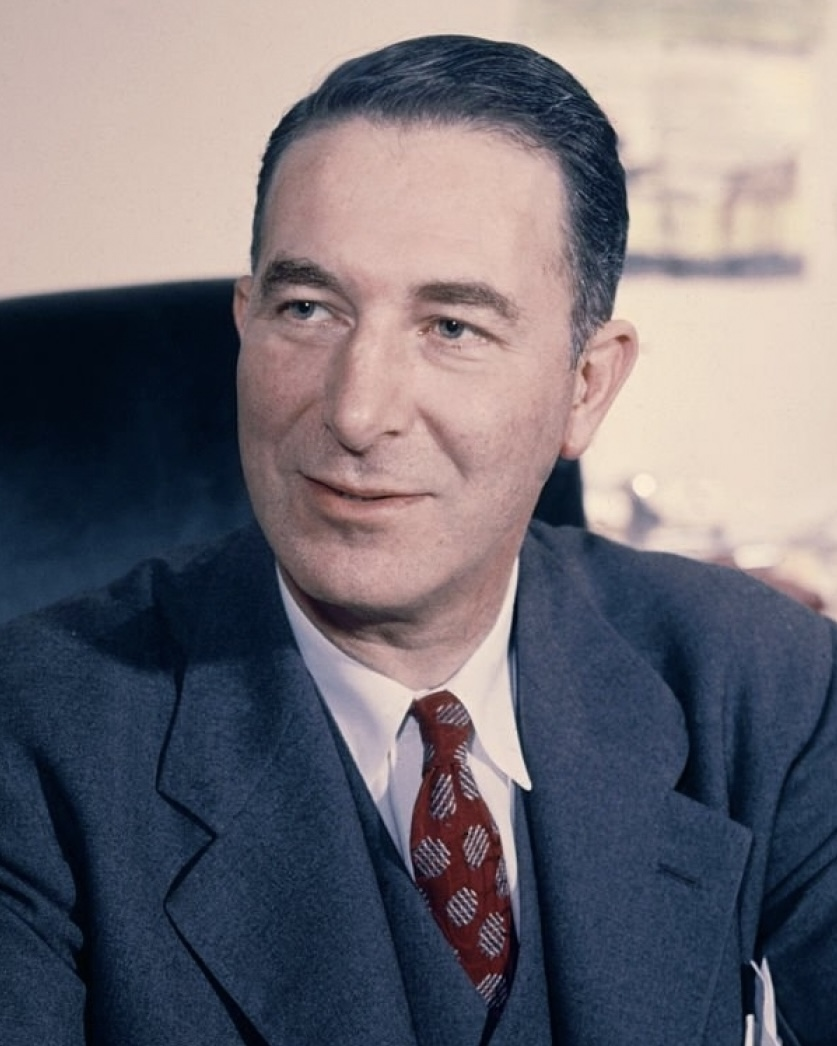
Candidate	Adlai Stevenson II	Estes Kefauver
Home state	Illinois	Tennessee
Contests won	7	9
Popular vote	3,069,504	2,283,172
Percentage	50.7%	37.7%
Previous Democratic nominee
Adlai Stevenson II
Democratic nominee
Adlai Stevenson II

From March 11 to June 5, 1956, voters of the Democratic Party chose its nominee for president in the 1956 United States presidential election. Former Illinois Governor Adlai Stevenson was selected as the nominee through a series of primary elections and caucuses culminating in the 1956 Democratic National Convention held from August 13 to August 17, 1956, in Chicago, Illinois. This was the party's second consecutive nomination of Stevenson.

== Candidates ==
=== Major candidates ===
These candidates participated in multiple state delegate election contests or were included in multiple major national polls.

Candidate	Most recent position	Home state	Campaign
Adlai Stevenson II	Democratic nominee for President (1952); Former Governor of Illinois (1949–53)	Illinois	(Campaign)
Estes Kefauver	U.S. Senator from Tennessee (1949–63); U.S. Representative from Tennessee (1939–49)	Tennessee	Withdrew: June 1956 (Campaign)
W. Averell Harriman	Governor of New York (1955–58); United States Secretary of Commerce (1946–48); United States Ambassador to the United Kingdom (1946); United States Ambassador to the Soviet Union (1943–46)	New York	

=== Favorite sons ===
The following candidates ran only in their home state's primary or caucuses for the purpose of controlling its delegate slate at the convention and did not appear to be considered national candidates by the media.

- Former Governor John S. Battle of Virginia
- Governor Happy Chandler of Kentucky
- U.S. Representative James C. Davis of Georgia
- Governor Frank Lausche of Ohio
- House Majority Leader John W. McCormack of Massachusetts
- Governor George Bell Timmerman Jr. of South Carolina

=== Declined to run ===
- Former President Harry S. Truman of Missouri
- Senate Majority Leader Lyndon B. Johnson of Texas

== Primary campaign ==
Estes Kefauver sought the Democratic presidential nomination, as he had in 1952. Initially, he again won some Democratic Party presidential primaries.

In the March 13, 1956 New Hampshire presidential primary, Kefauver defeated Stevenson, his only formidable opponent for the nomination, by a margin of 21,701 to 3,806.

A week later, Kefauver defeated Stevenson in the March 20, 1956 Minnesota presidential primary, winning 245,885 votes compared to Stevenson's 186,723 votes. Kefauver was also victorious in the Wisconsin presidential primary. Stevenson picked up his native Illinois in a landslide. By April 1956, "it appeared that Kefauver was on his way to a primary sweep matching the spectacular performance in 1952."

=== Florida primary ===
One of the first televised United States presidential debates was held as an hour long one-on-one debate between the party's top-two contenders, Kefauver and Stevenson. The debate was held in Miami, Florida ahead of the state's primary.

Russell Baker of The New York Times wrote that the two contenders took near-identical stances on most of the issues discussed in the debate.

=== California primary ===
The June California primary proved decisive for the nomination, delivering Stevenson a major victory and leading to the suspension of Kefauver's campaign for the nomination.

== Polling ==
View source data.

=== National polling ===
Poll source	Publication	Averell Harriman	Lyndon Baines Johnson	Estes Kefauver	Frank Lausche	Adlai Stevenson	Stuart Symington	Harry S. Truman
Gallup	Aug. 1953	–	–	17%	–	53%	1%	11%
Gallup	Aug. 1954	–	–	22%	–	57%	–	–
Gallup	Nov. 1954	4%	–	16%	2%	58%	–	–
Gallup	Mar. 1955	14%	–	48%	2%	–	5%	1%
Gallup	Apr. 1955	17%	–	37%	4%	–	3%	1%
Gallup	Aug. 1955	6%	1%	16%	–	55%	–	1%
Gallup	Oct. 1955	8%	–	16%	2%	51%	2%	–
Gallup	Nov. 1955	10%	1%	11%	1%	48%	1%	1%
Gallup	Nov. 1955	8%	–	12%	–	38%	–	–
Gallup	Dec. 1955	8%	–	17%	3%	51%	–	–
Gallup	Jan. 1956	8%	3%	17%	3%	49%	–	–
Gallup	Feb. 1956	8%	2%	18%	2%	51%	1%	–
Gallup	Apr. 1956	6%	3%	33%	2%	39%	2%	–
Gallup	Apr. 1956	6%	4%	29%	3%	41%	2%	–
Gallup	June 1956	8%	4%	26%	3%	42%	3%	–
Gallup	June 1956	12%	4%	16%	3%	45%	4%	–

== See also ==
- 1956 Republican Party presidential primaries
- 1956 New Jersey Democratic presidential primary
