= 1956 Democratic National Convention =

U.S. political event held in Chicago, Illinois

- 1956 presidential election
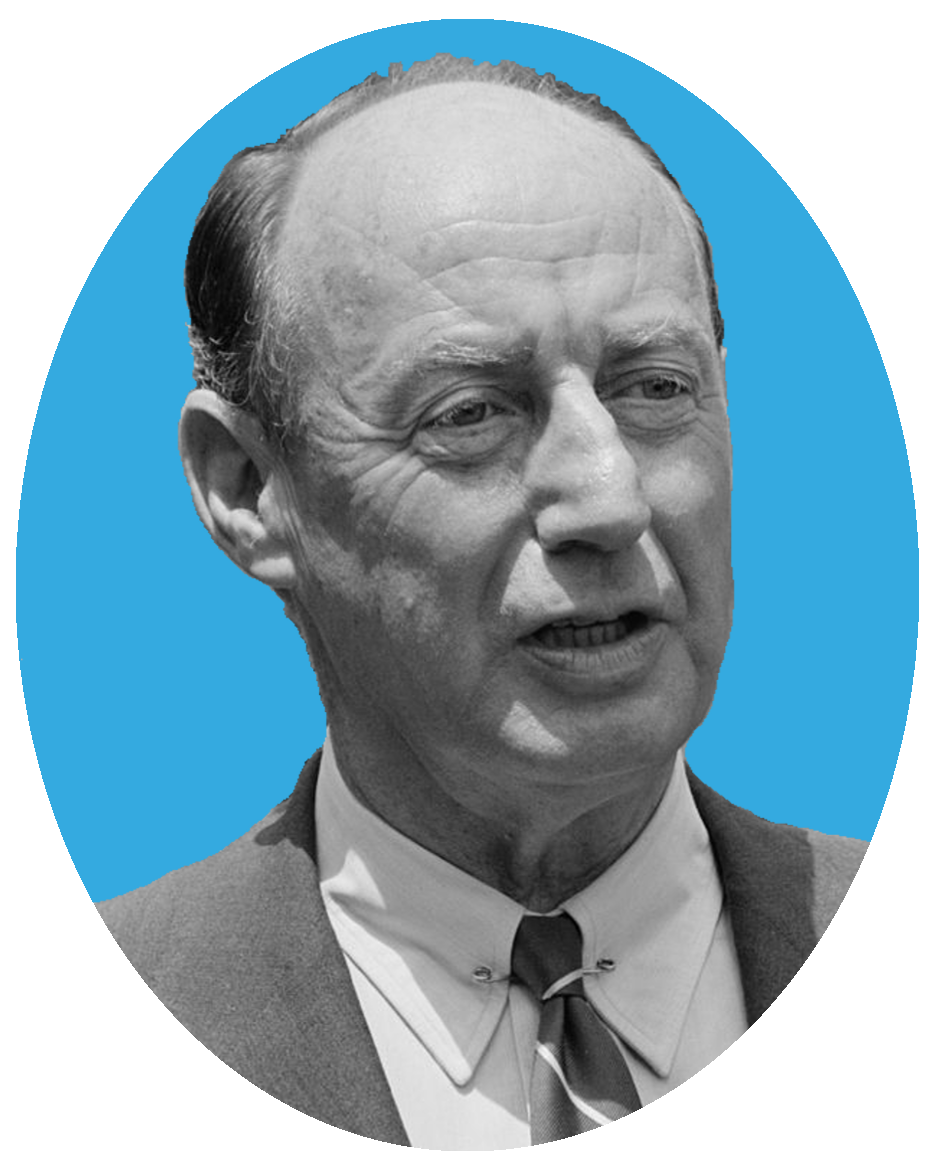
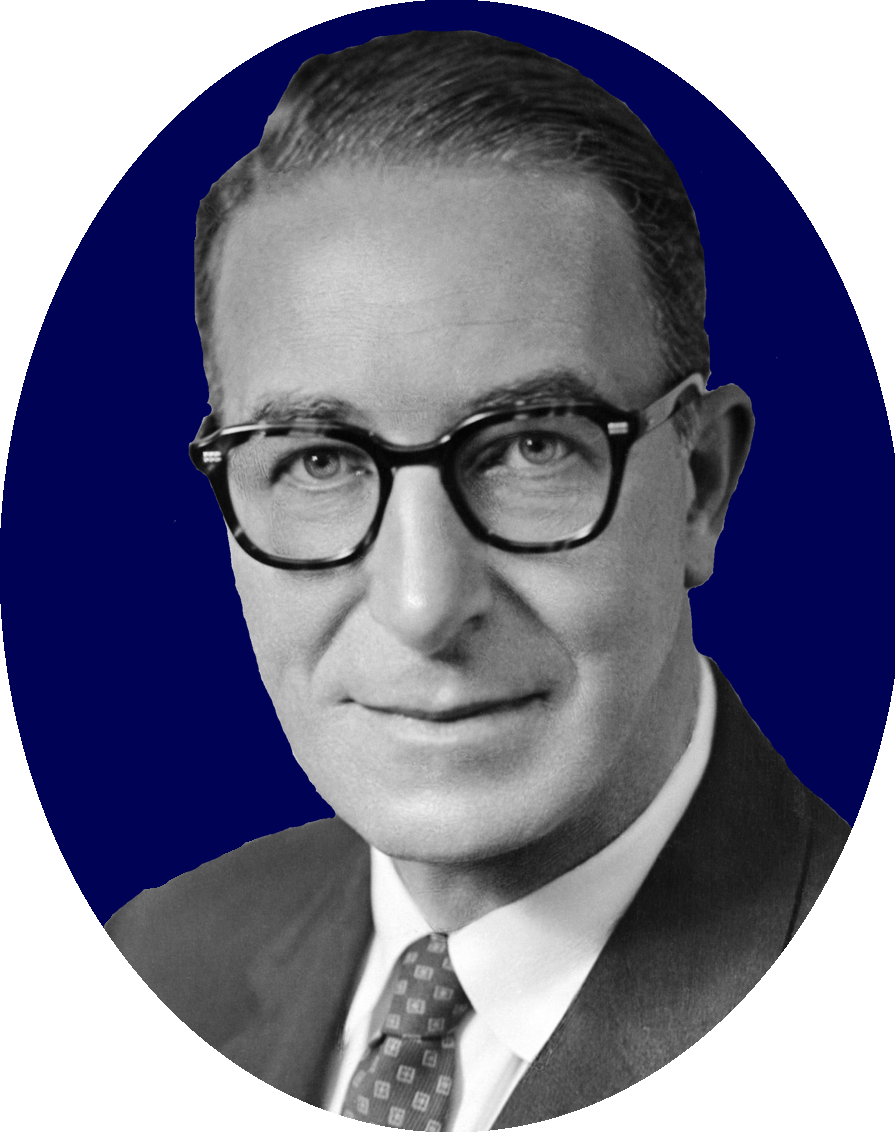
- Nominees; Stevenson and Kefauver

Convention
- Dates: August 13–17, 1956
- City: Chicago, Illinois
- Venue: International Amphitheatre
- Keynote speaker: Gov. Frank G. Clement of Tennessee

Candidates
- Presidential nominee: Adlai Stevenson of Illinois
- Vice-presidential nominee: Estes Kefauver of Tennessee

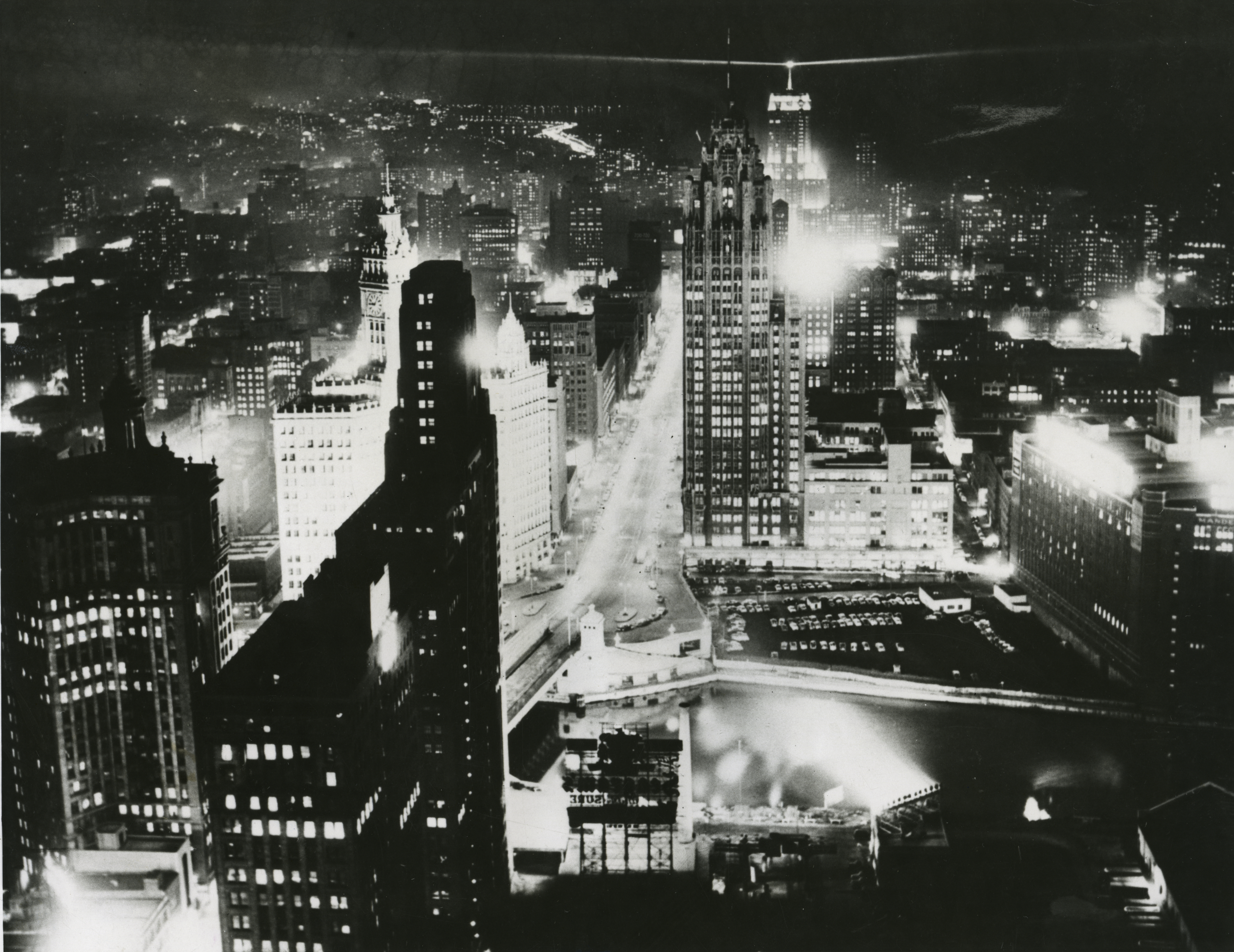
The Chicago skyline along the Magnificent Mile on the night of August 11, 1956, two days before the convention's opening session

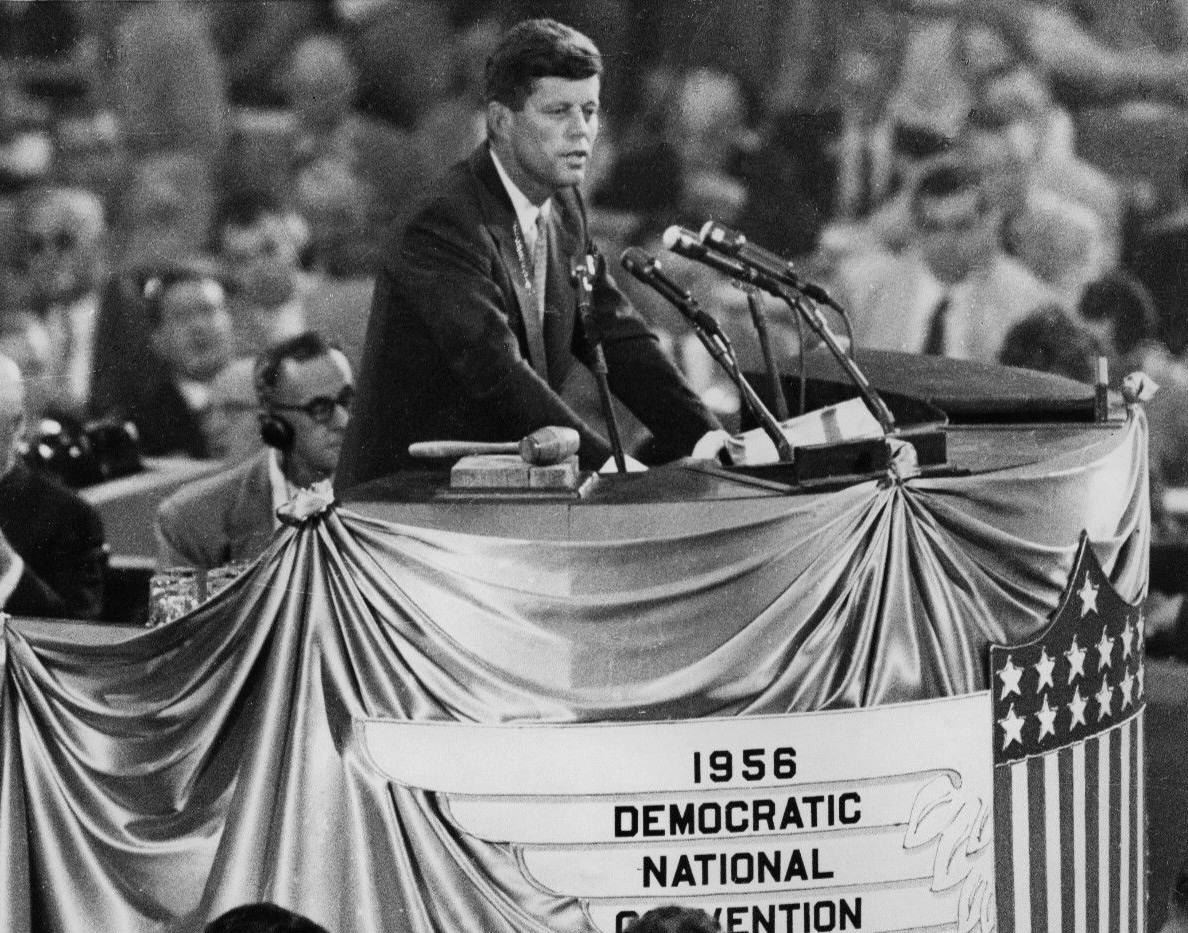
U.S. Senator John F. Kennedy nominates Stevenson as the Democratic candidate for president.

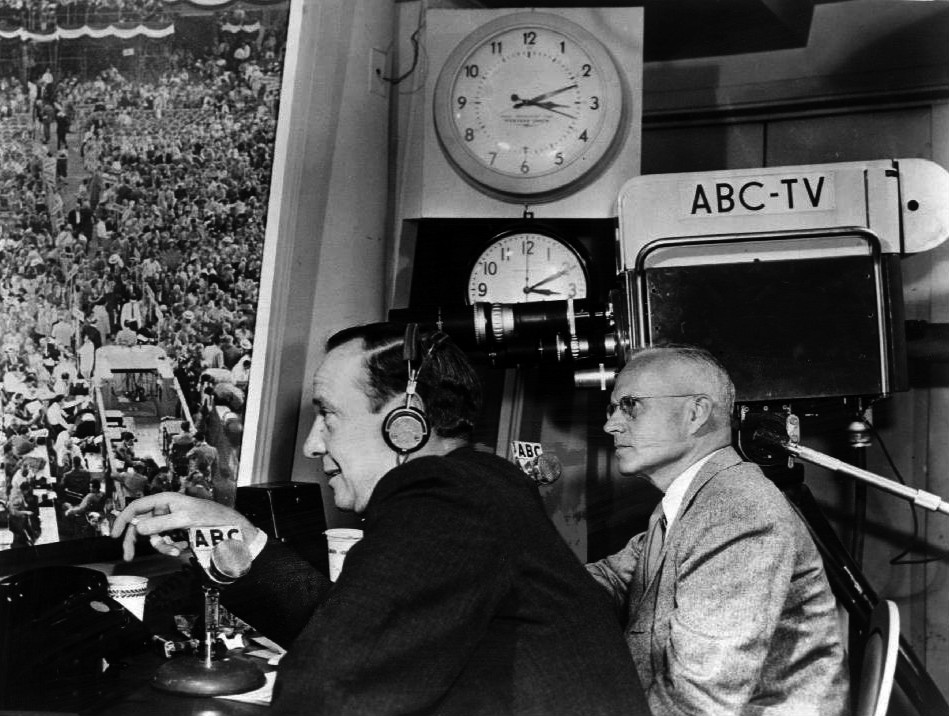
John Daly and Quincy Howe providing ABC's coverage of a convention in the 1950s. 1956 was the second election year that the conventions were broadcast coast-to-coast

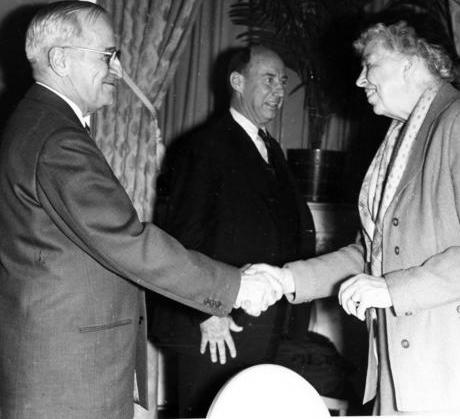
Former President Truman (left) greets Eleanor Roosevelt (right) at the convention as Adlai Stevenson (center) looks on

The 1956 Democratic National Convention nominated former Governor Adlai Stevenson of Illinois for president and Senator Estes Kefauver of Tennessee for vice president. It was held in the International Amphitheatre on the South Side of Chicago from August 13 to August 17, 1956. Unsuccessful candidates for the presidential nomination included Governor W. Averell Harriman of New York, Senator Lyndon B. Johnson of Texas, and Senator Stuart Symington of Missouri.

The convention was marked by a "free vote" for the vice presidential nomination in which the winner, Kefauver, defeated Senator John F. Kennedy of Massachusetts. As of 2024, this was the last time any presidential or vice presidential nomination of either the Democratic or Republican parties, went past the first ballot.

== Run up to the Convention ==
As the unsuccessful 1952 Democratic Party presidential nominee, Stevenson had the highest stature of the active candidates. Despite a number of primary wins by Kefauver, Stevenson managed to pull back and win California and come into the convention with momentum. However Stevenson was widely seen as having between 400 and 600 of the 687^{1/2} delegates he needed to secure the nomination.

== Scheduling and logistics of convention ==
The 1956 Democratic convention was held before that year's Republican National Convention. This was unusual, as since 1864, in every election but 1888, Democrats had held their convention second. It has become an informal tradition that the party holding the White House (which, accordingly, in 1956 had been the Republican Party) hosts their convention second, but it is unclear when this tradition began. Democrats had held the White House and held their conventions second between 1936 and 1952, but it is unclear whether they scheduled their conventions second in these years because of their White House incumbency, or whether they scheduled them second because it was traditional that Democratic National Conventions had been held after the Republican National Convention.

This was the second election in which conventions were televised live coast-to-coast. Television had, by 1956, become the dominant medium of popular news coverage. To adjust to the medium of television, the convention was condensed in length compared to previous years, with daytime sessions being largely eliminated and the amount of welcoming speeches and parliamentary organization speeches being decreased (such as seconding speeches for vice-presidential candidates, which were eliminated). Sessions were also scheduled in order to maximize exposure to prime-time audience.

== The 1956 Democratic Platform ==
With regard to the growing Civil Rights Movement, the platform called for voting rights, equal employment opportunities, and the desegregation of public schools. Relative to the Republicans, the Democrats favored greater reliance on the United Nations, multilateral disarmament, more spending for programs relating to social welfare and agriculture, "a full and integrated program of development, protection, management and conservation of natural resources," and the use of peaceful atomic energy.

== Presidential nomination ==
Former President Harry S. Truman, whose support for Stevenson in 1952 helped secure him the nomination, in a surprise move decided to oppose to his renomination in 1956, instead favoring Harriman. This was seen as opening up the Presidential nomination, with a number of candidates coming forward.

As well as Stevenson's 400 to 600 of the required 687^{1/2} delegates there were 202 pledged to Kefauver due to his primary wins and New York's delegation pledged to Harriman. There were also eight states with favorite son nominees which meant that the state was free to switch.

One of these favorite sons was Lyndon Johnson from Texas, at the time the Senate Majority Leader who had the support of prominent southern legislative leaders Senator Richard Russell and fellow Texan Sam Rayburn, the House Speaker. Although at first Johnson was not running more than a token campaign, he believed that Truman's announcement had opened the nomination up.

Despite all the maneuvering Stevenson won convincingly on the first ballot with 905^{1/2} delegates over Harriman's 210, with Johnson only winning the 80 votes of the Texas and Mississippi delegations.

=== Presidential candidates ===
Former Governor Adlai Stevenson of Illinois

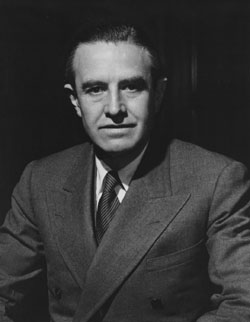
Governor W. Averell Harriman of New York

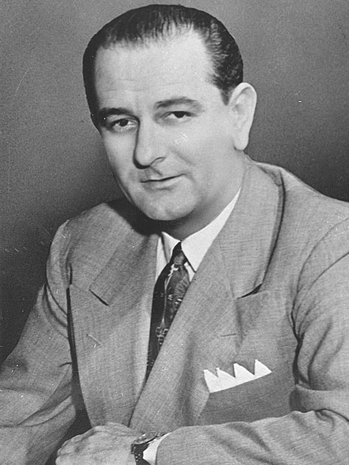
Senate Majority Leader Lyndon B. Johnson of Texas

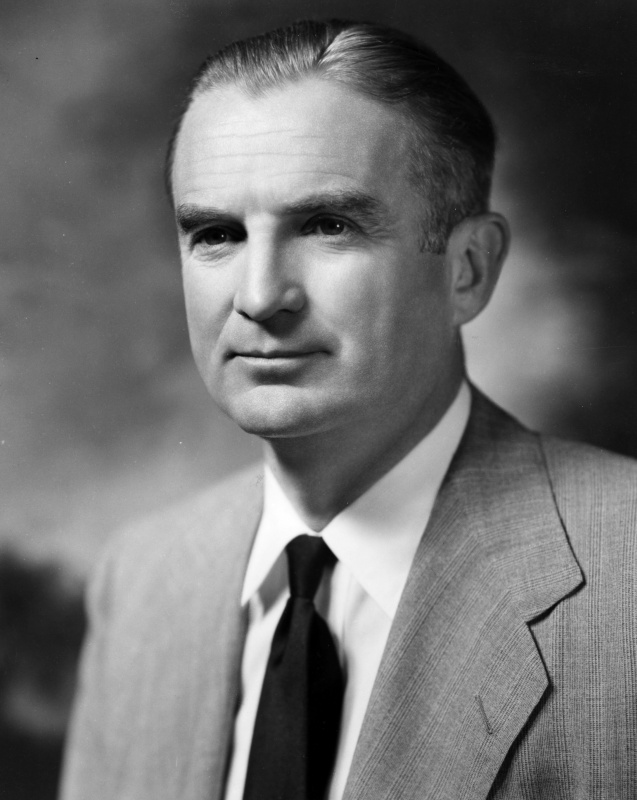
Senator Stuart Symington of Missouri

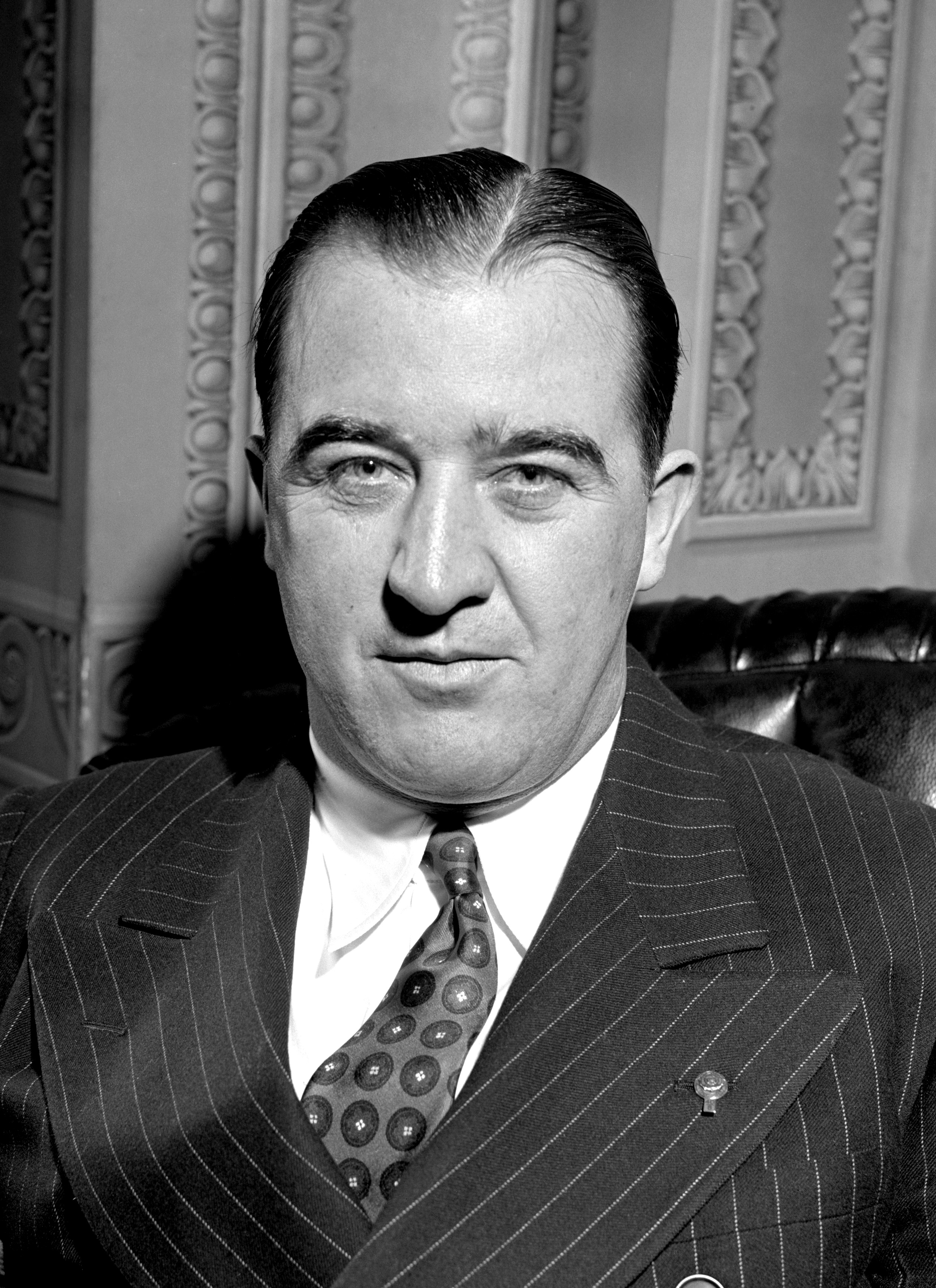
Governor Happy Chandler of Kentucky

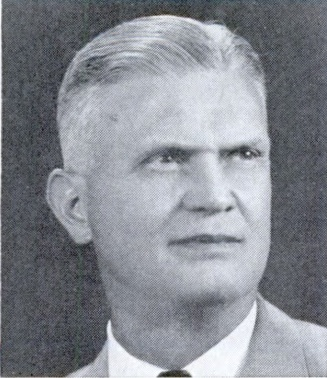
Representative James C. Davis of Georgia

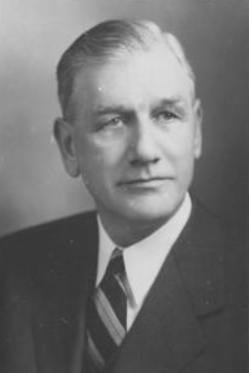
Former Governor John S. Battle of Virginia

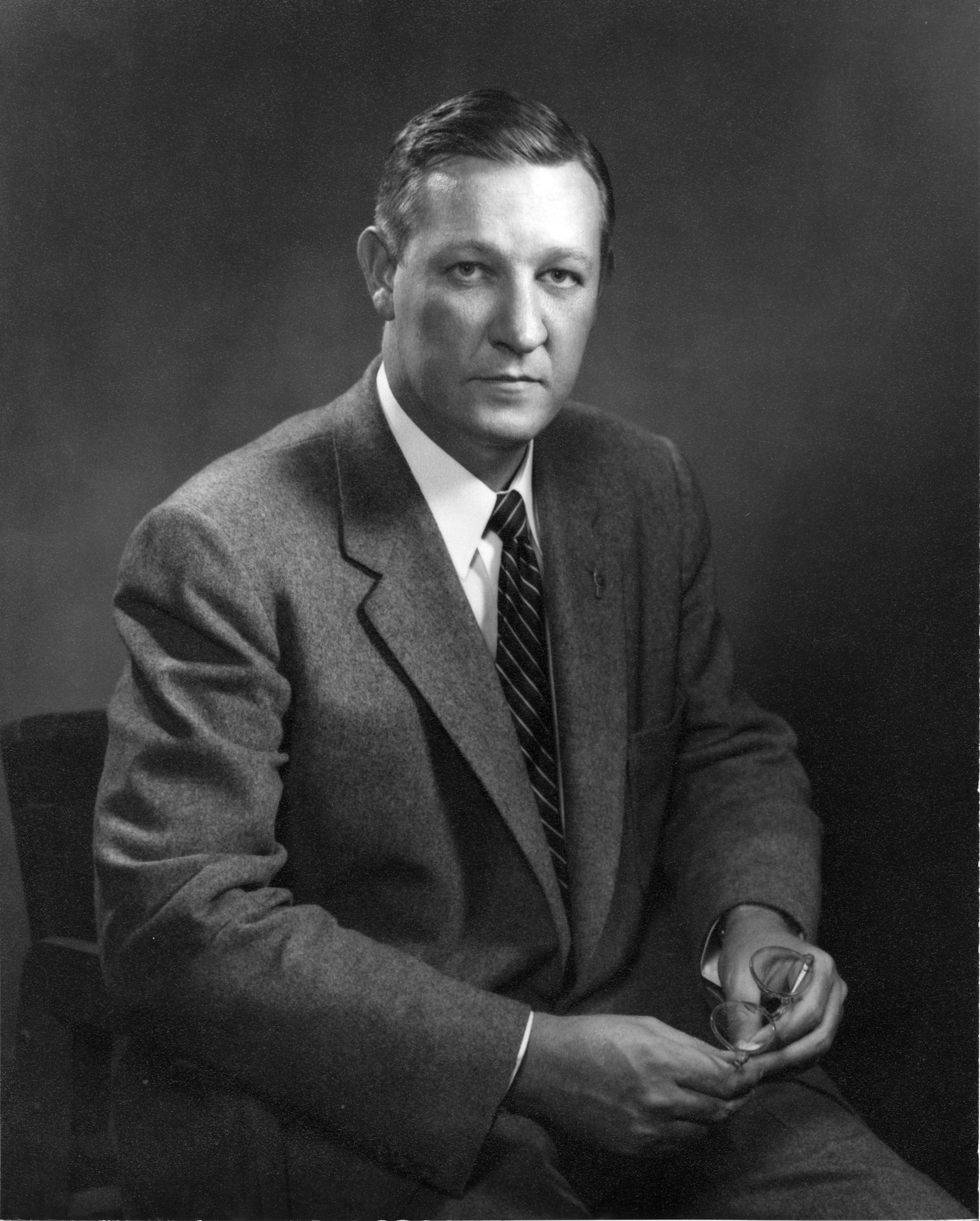
Governor George Timmerman of South Carolina

The roll call, as reported in Richard C. Bain and Judith H. Parris, Convention Decisions and Voting Records, pp. 294–298:

Presidential Balloting
Candidate	1st
Stevenson	905.5
Harriman	210
Johnson	80
Symington	45.5
Chandler	36.5
Davis	33
Battle	32.5
Timmerman	23.5
Lausche	5.5

Presidential Balloting / 4th Day of Convention (August 16, 1956)

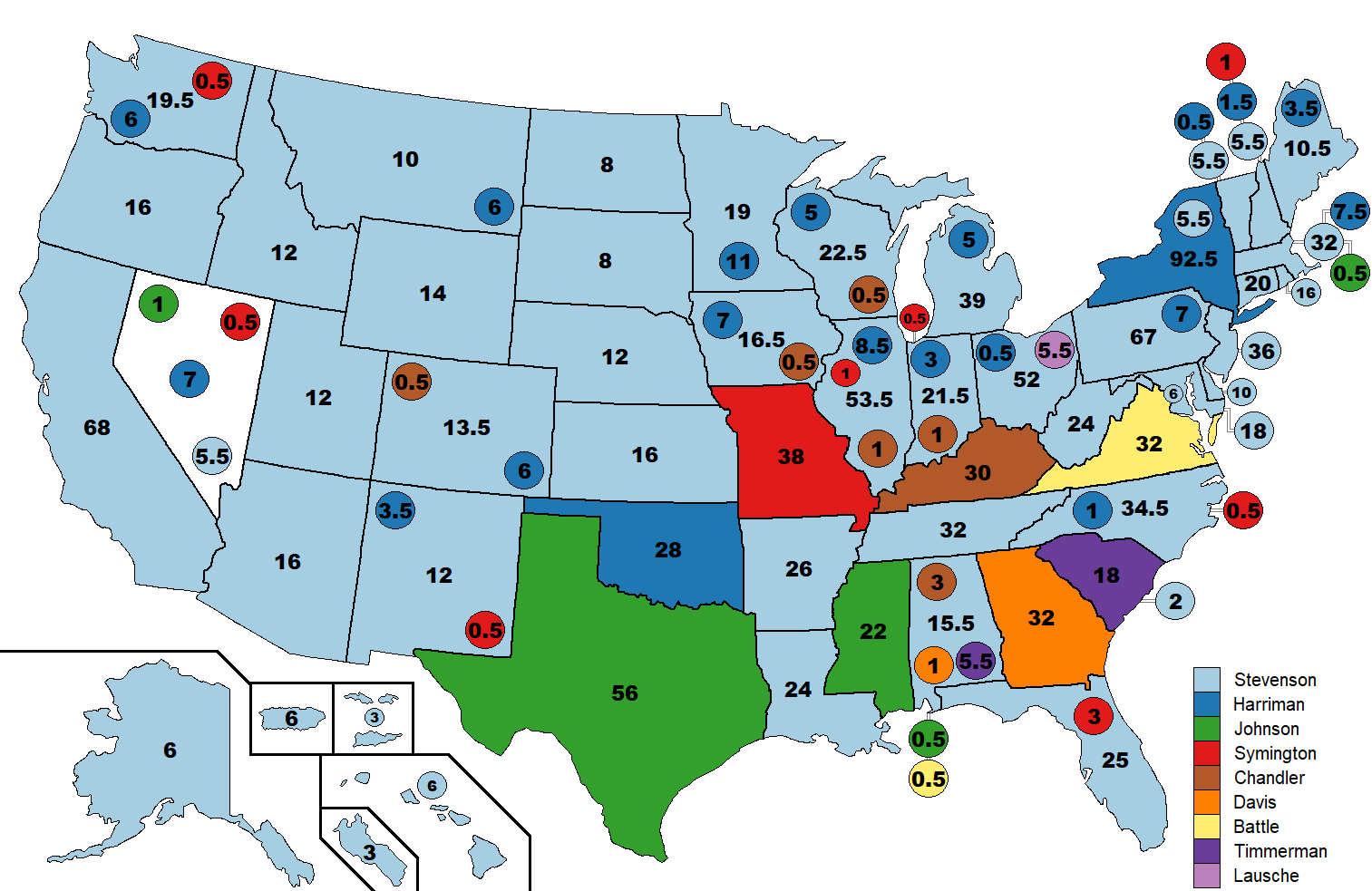
1st Presidential Ballot

== Vice presidential nomination ==
The highlight of the 1956 Democratic Convention came when Stevenson, in an effort to create excitement for the ticket, made the surprise announcement that the convention's delegates would choose his running mate.

Stevenson decided not to reselect his 1952 running mate John Sparkman. This set off a desperate scramble among several candidates to win the nomination. A good deal of the excitement of the vice-presidential race came from the fact that the candidates had only one hectic day to campaign among the delegates before the voting began. The two leading contenders were Senator Kefauver, who retained the support of his primary delegates, and John F. Kennedy, who, as a first term Senator from Massachusetts, was relatively unknown at that point. Kennedy surprised the experts by surging into the lead on the second ballot; at one point he was only 39 votes shy of winning. However, a number of states then left their "favorite son" candidates and switched to Kefauver, giving him the victory. Kennedy then gave a gracious concession speech. The narrow defeat raised his profile and helped Kennedy's long-term presidential chances; by losing to Kefauver he avoided any blame for Stevenson's expected loss to Eisenhower in November. The vice presidential nomination vote, which required three separate ballots, was (as of 2024) the last multi-balloted contest held at a quadrennial political convention of any major U.S. political party for the presidency or vice presidency.

Candidates

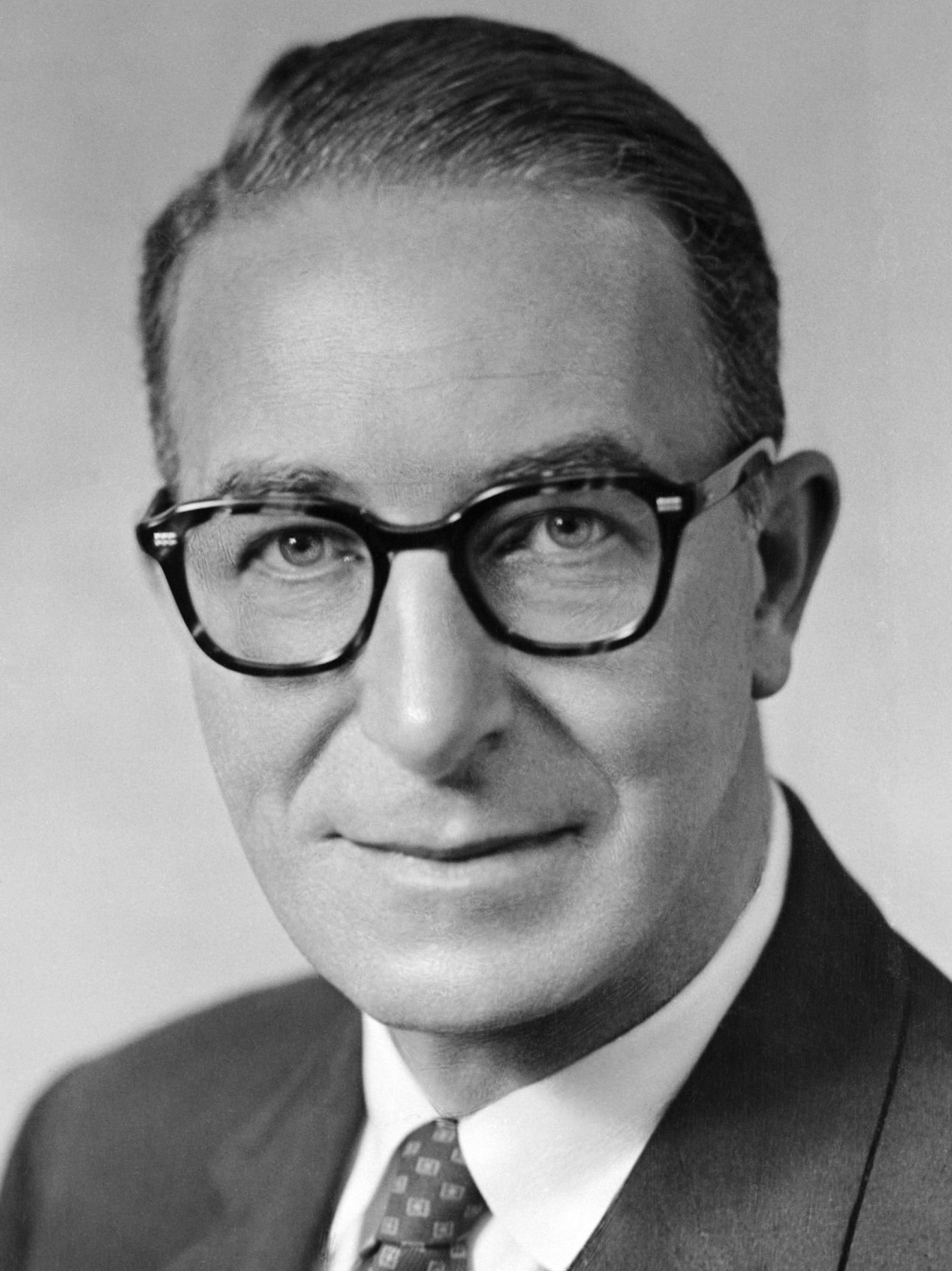
Senator Estes Kefauver of Tennessee

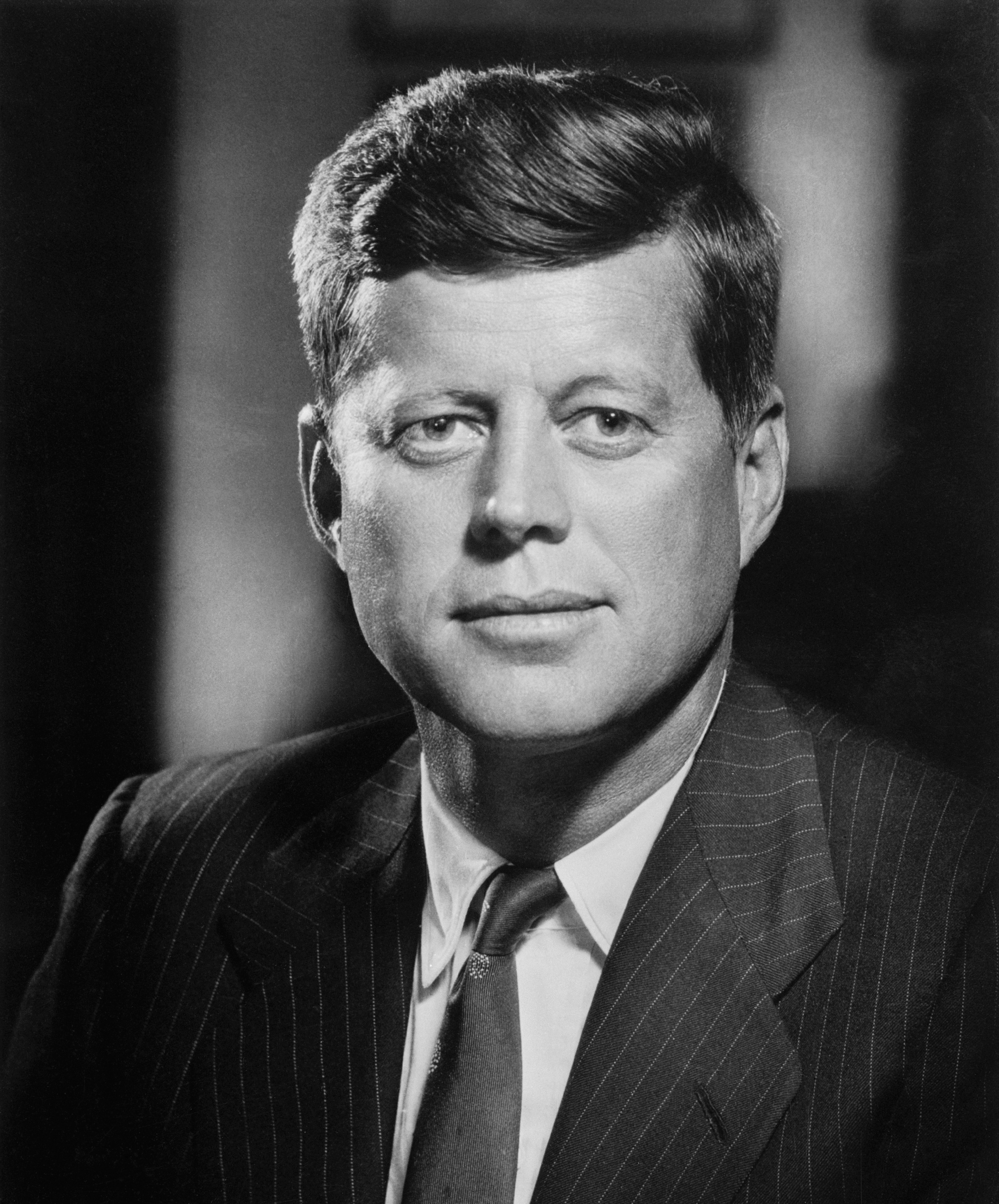
Senator John F. Kennedy of Massachusetts

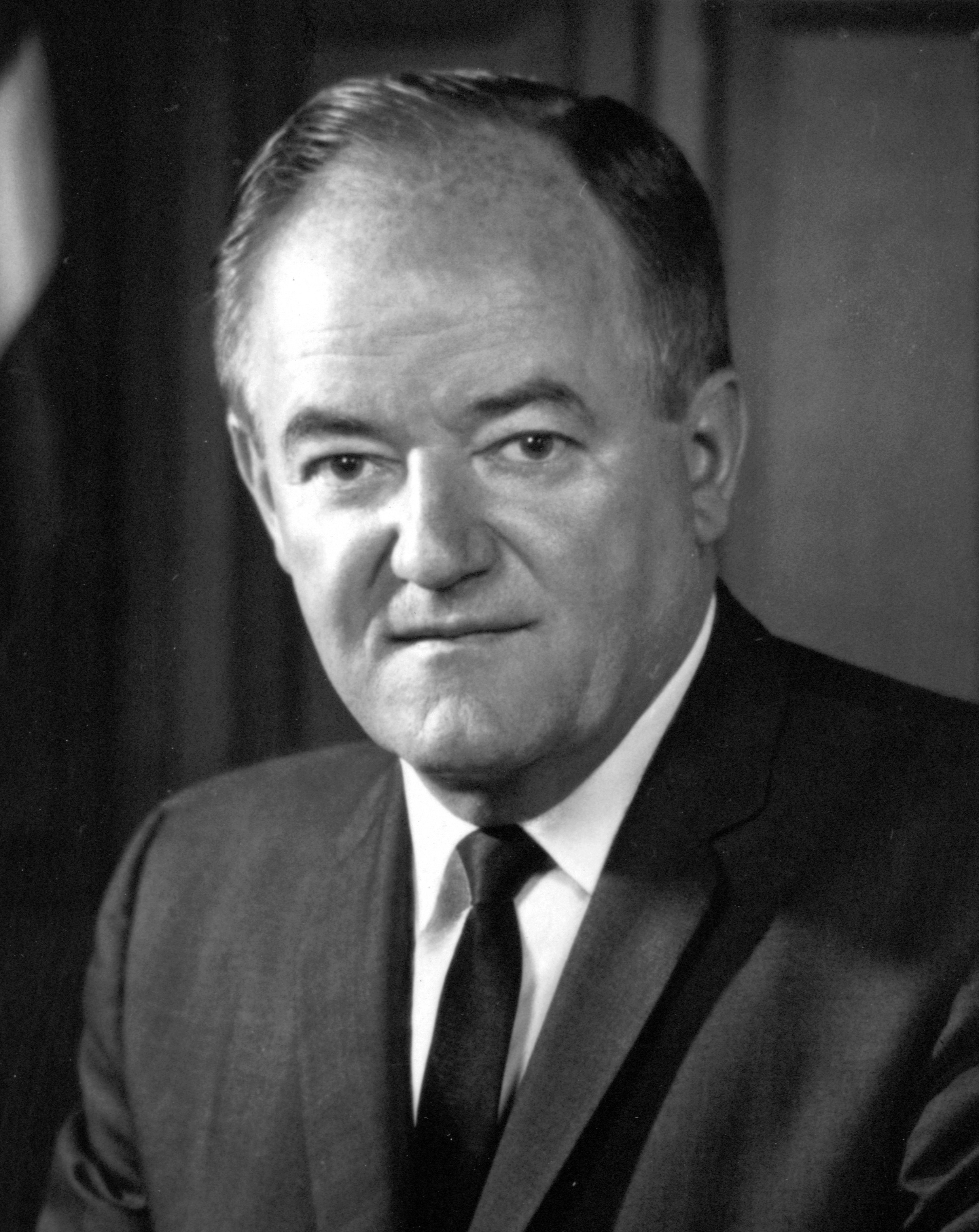
Senator Hubert Humphrey of Minnesota

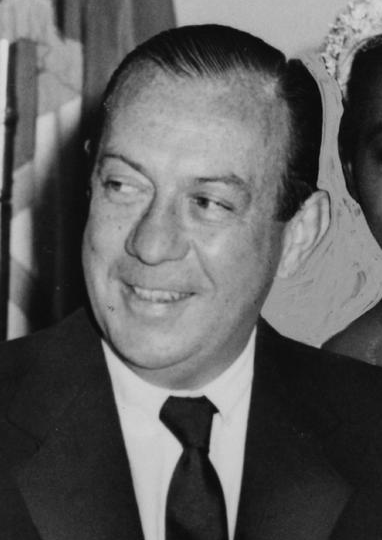
New York Mayor Robert F. Wagner Jr. of New York

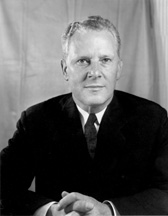
Senator Albert Gore Sr. of Tennessee

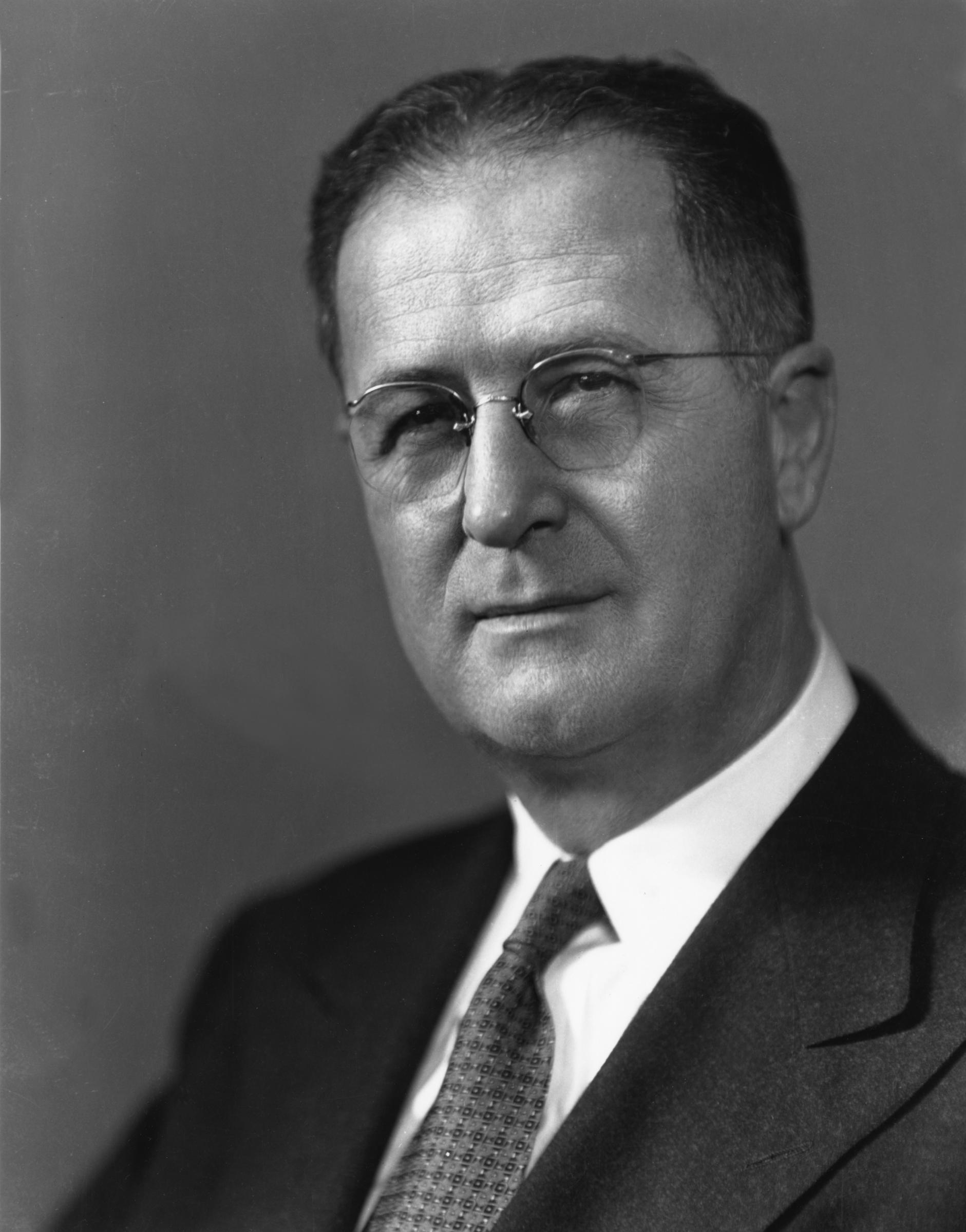
Senator Clinton P. Anderson of New Mexico

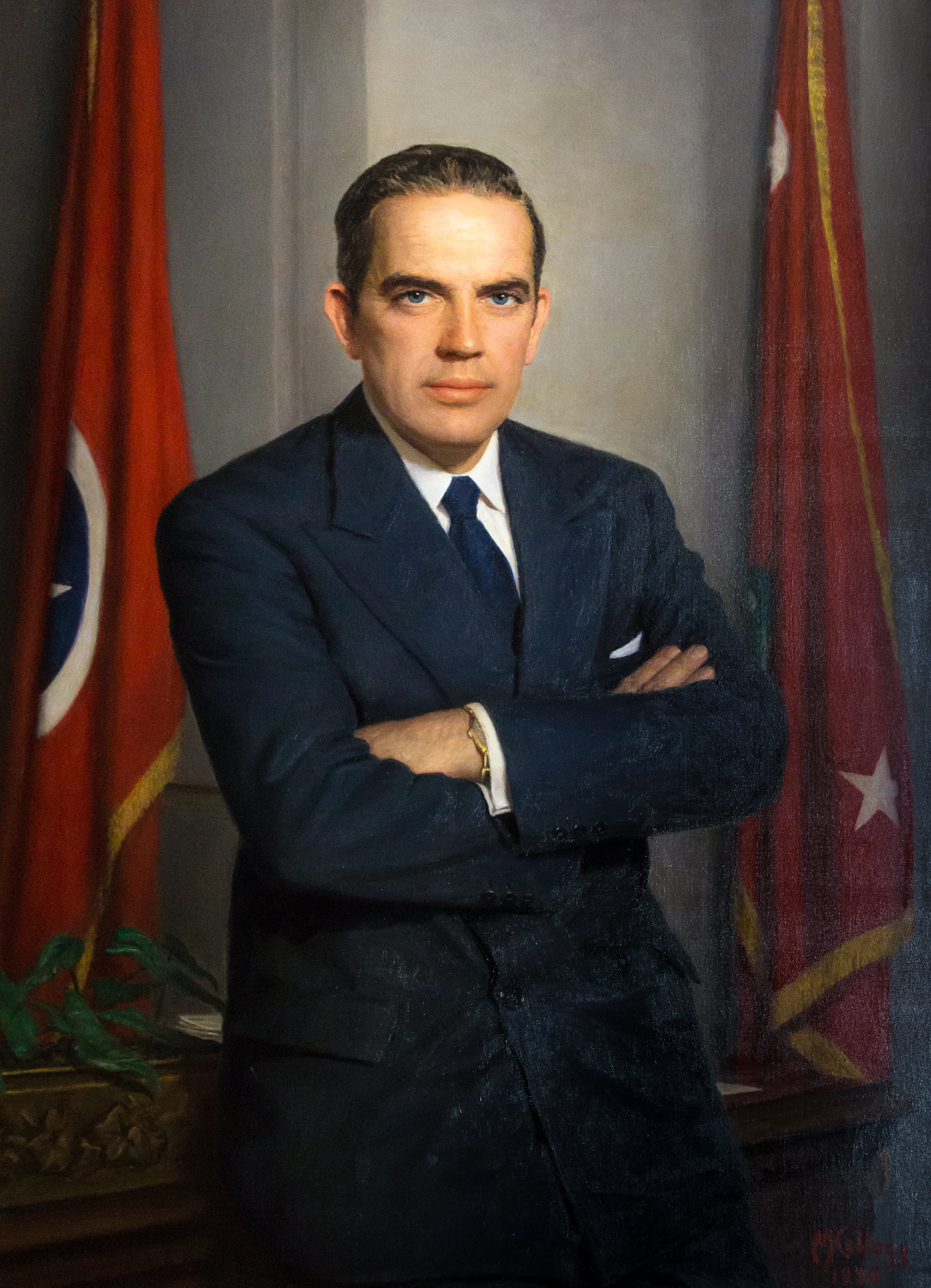
Governor Frank G. Clement of Tennessee

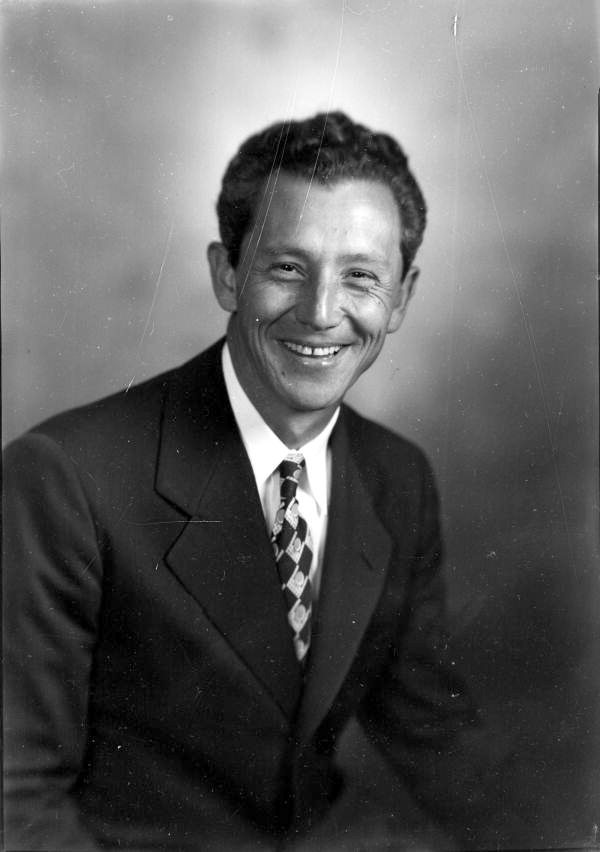
Governor LeRoy Collins of Florida

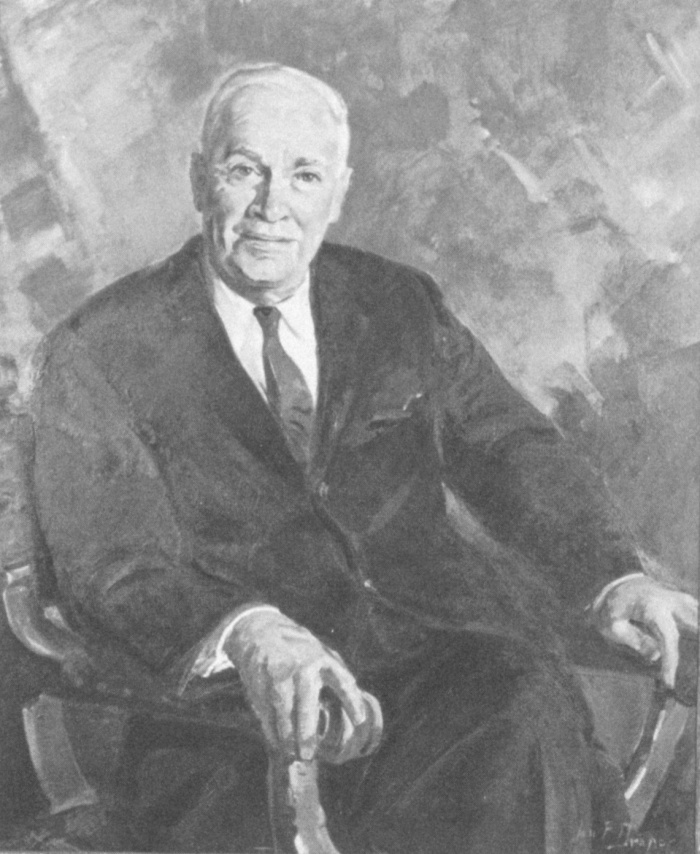
Governor Luther H. Hodges of North Carolina

The vote totals in the vice presidential balloting are recorded in the following table, which also comes from Bain & Parris.

Vice Presidential Balloting
Candidate	1st (Before Shifts)	1st (After Shifts)	2nd (Before Shifts)	2nd (During Shifts)	2nd (After Shifts)	Unanimous
Kefauver	466.5	483.5	551.5	551.5	755.5	1,372
Kennedy	294.5	304	618	648	589	
Gore	178	178	110.5	80.5	13.5	
Wagner	162.5	162.5	9.5	9.5	6	
Humphrey	134	134.5	74.5	74.5	2	
Hodges	40	40	0.5	0.5	0	
Maner	33	33	0	0	0	
Collins	28.5	1.5	0	0	0	
Anderson	16	16	0	0	0	
Clement	13.5	13.5	0.5	0.5	0.5	
Brown	1	1	0.5	0.5	0	
Symington	1	1	0	0	0	
Johnson	0.5	0.5	0	0	0	
Not Voting	3	3	6.5	6.5	5.5	

Vice Presidential Balloting / 5th Day of Convention (August 17, 1956)

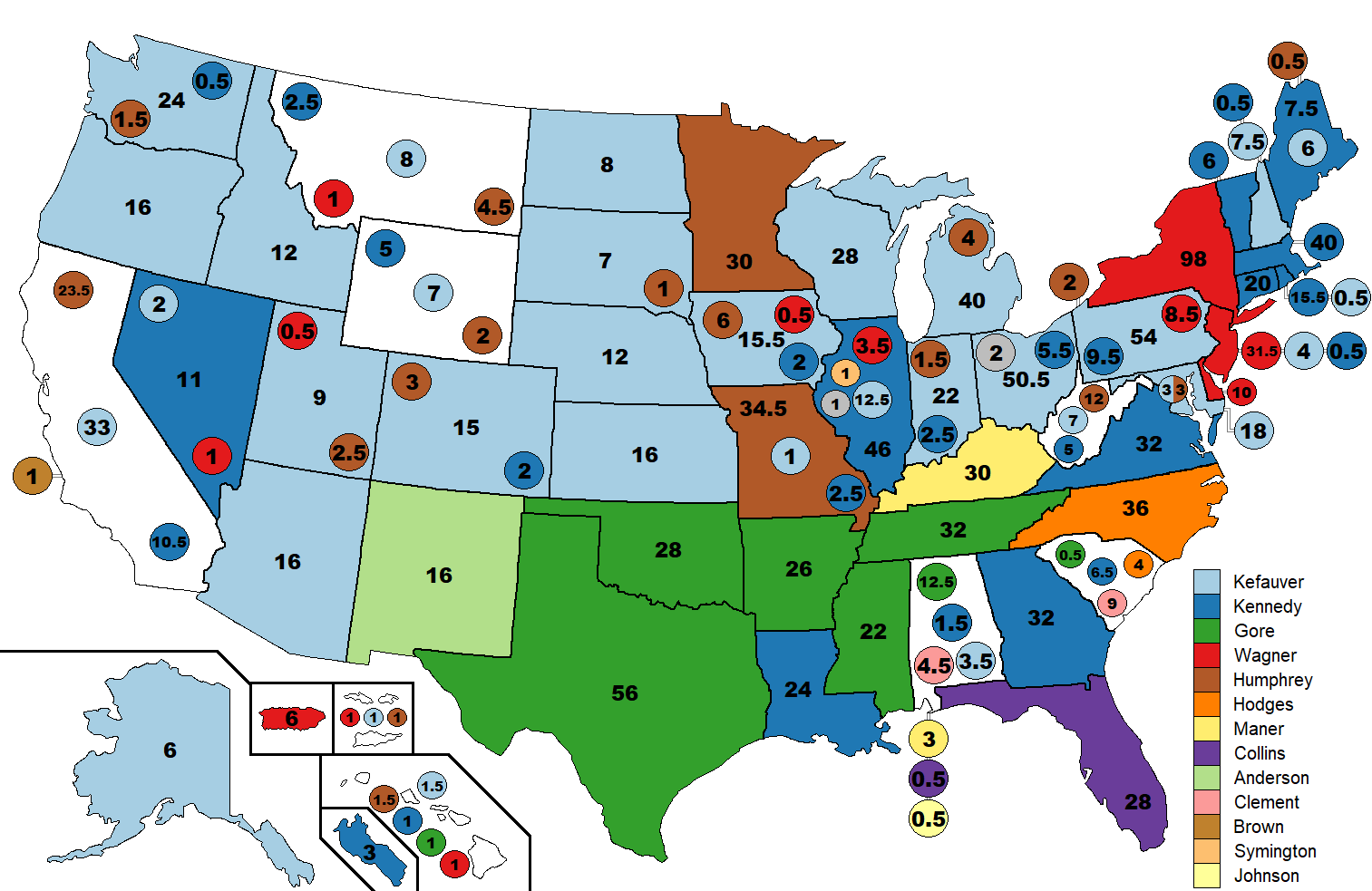
1st Vice Presidential Ballot (Before Shifts)

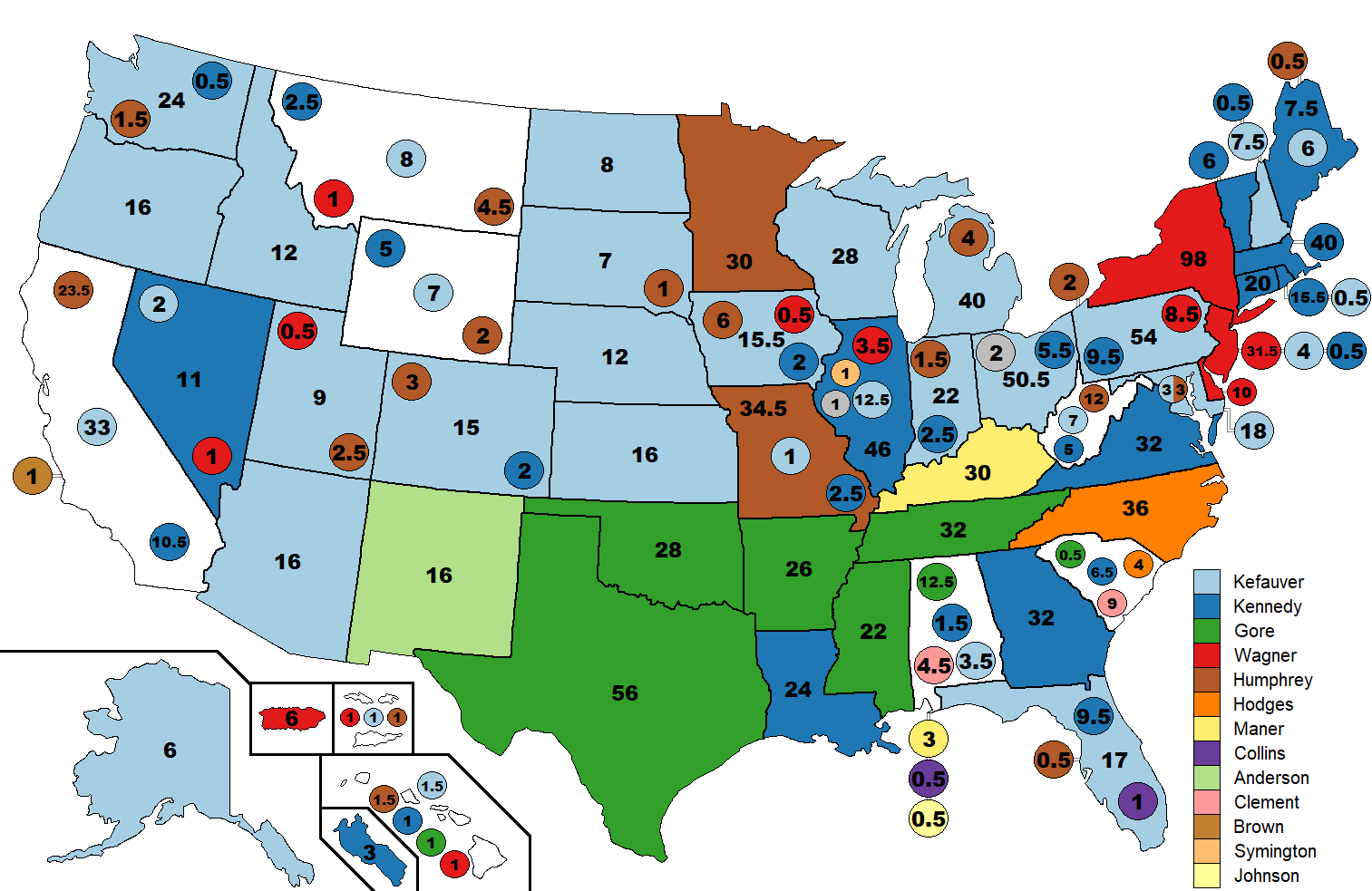
1st Vice Presidential Ballot (After Shifts)

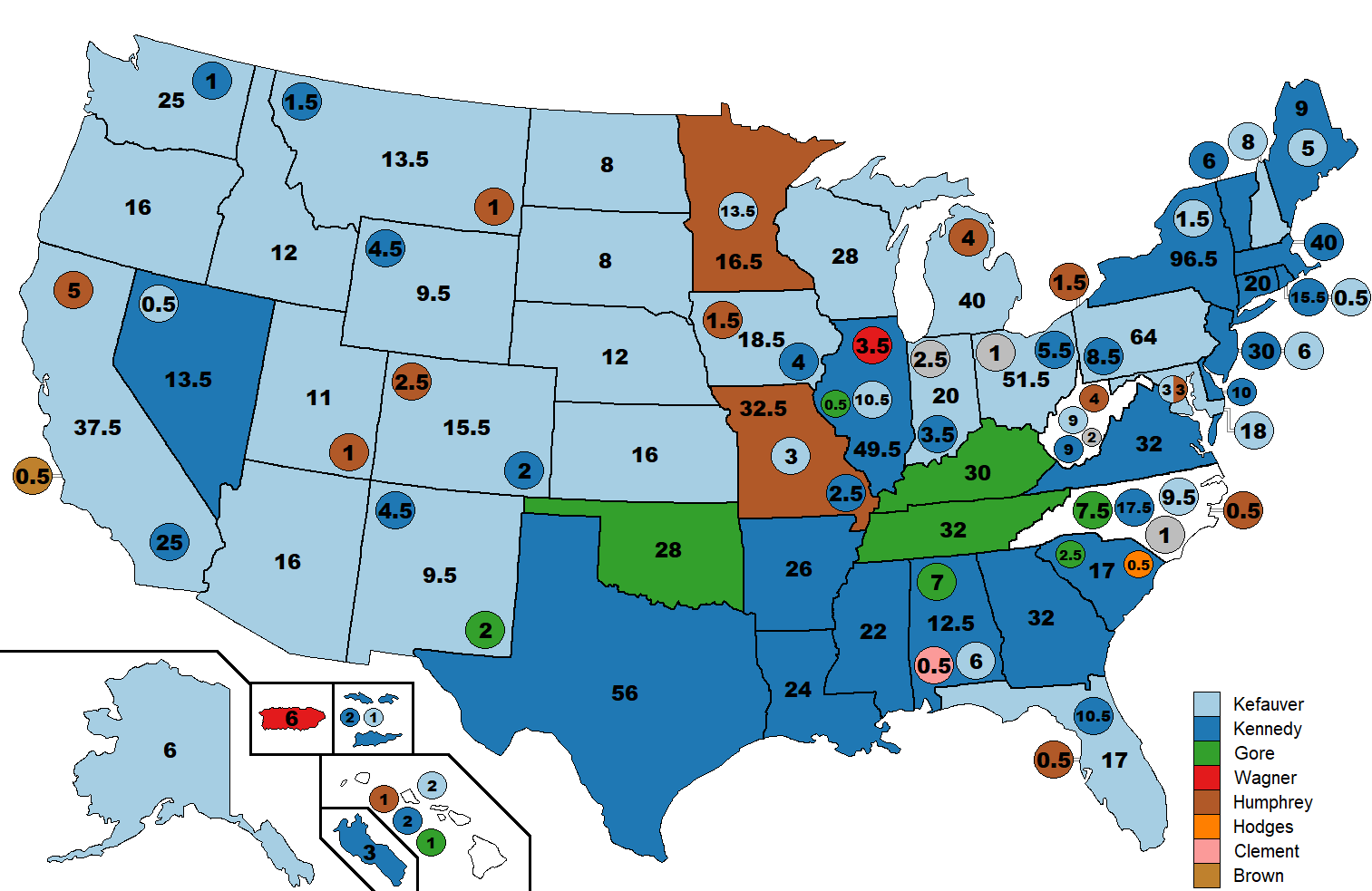
2nd Vice Presidential Ballot (Before Shifts)

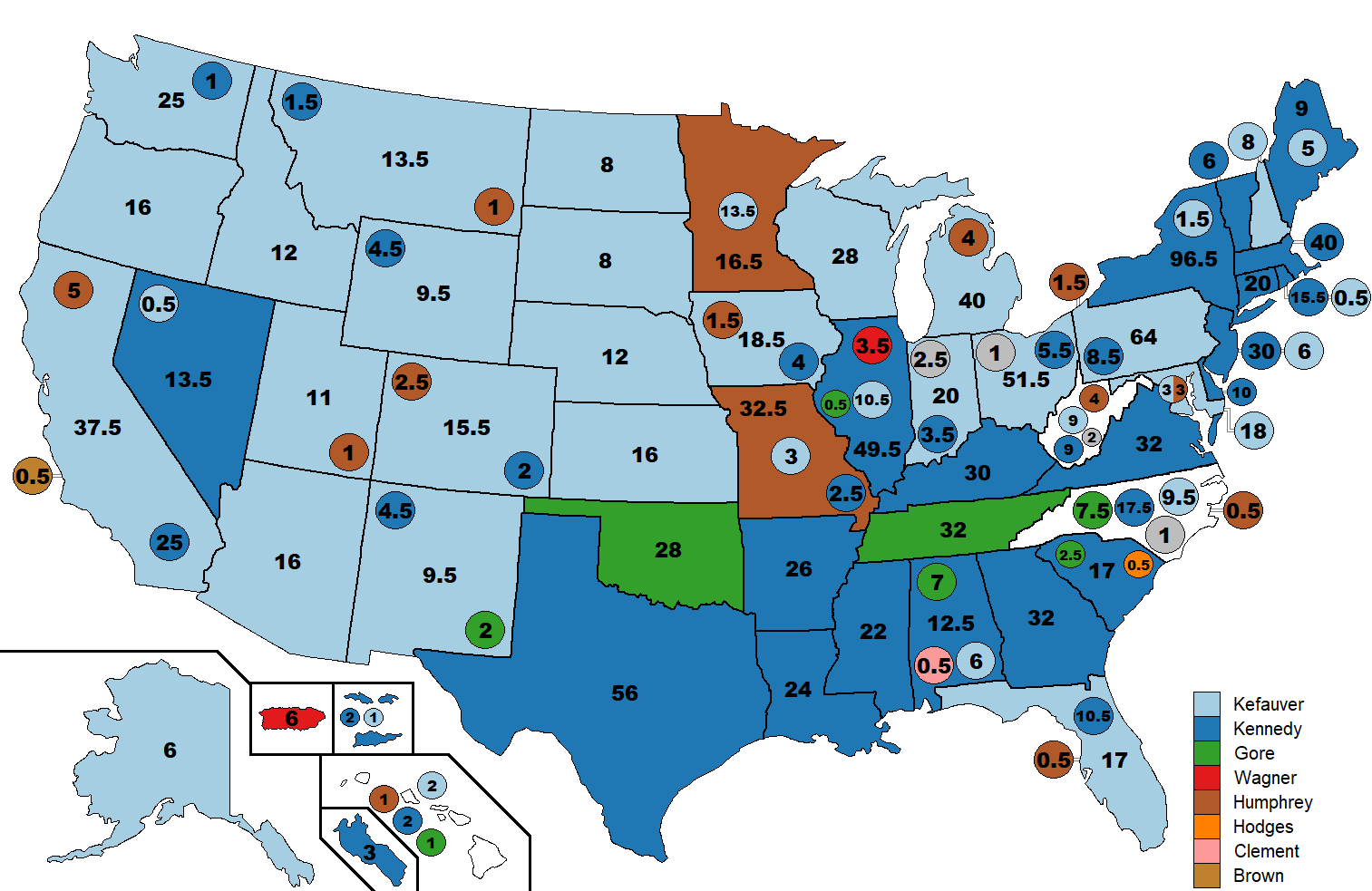
2nd Vice Presidential Ballot (During Shifts)

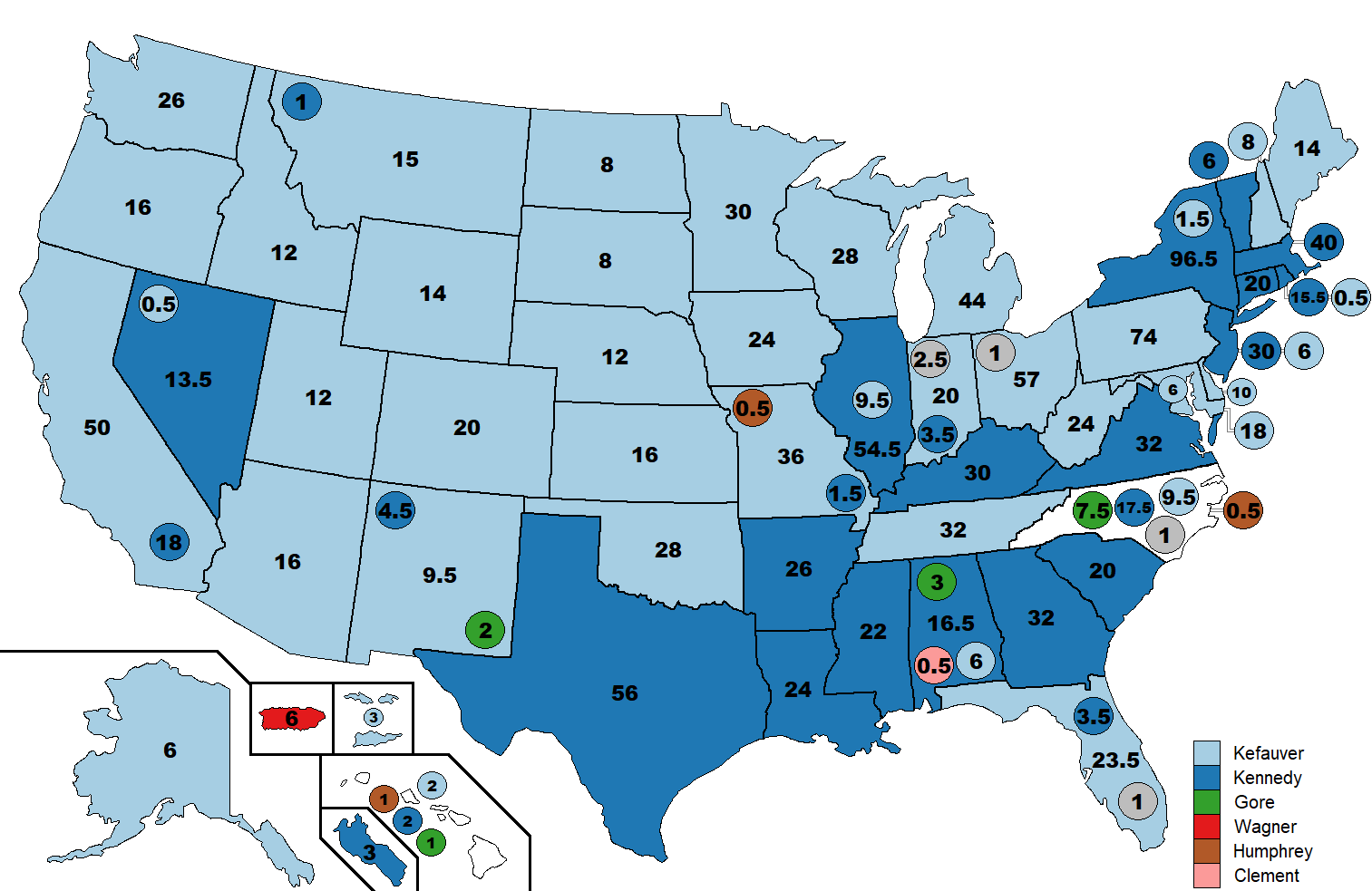
2nd Vice Presidential Ballot (After Shifts)

== Election outcome ==
The Democratic convention preceded the 1956 Republican convention in the Cow Palace, San Francisco, California. At the GOP gathering, President Dwight D. Eisenhower and Vice President Richard Nixon were nominated for reelection.

On November 6, Stevenson and Kefauver lost the election in a landslide.

== See also ==
- History of the Democratic Party (United States)
- List of Democratic National Conventions
- United States presidential nominating convention

Preceded by 1952Chicago, Illinois	Democratic National Conventions	Succeeded by 1960Los Angeles, California
