= Brooklyn–Battery Tunnel =

Tunnel in New York City

Overview
- Official name: Hugh L. Carey Tunnel
- Other name: Battery Tunnel
- Location: Brooklyn and Manhattan, New York
- Coordinates: 40.695833°N 74.013611°W
- Route: I-478 Toll (unsigned)
- Crosses: East River

Operation
- Opened: May 25, 1950; 76 years ago
- Operator: MTA Bridges and Tunnels
- Traffic: 54,076 (2016)
- Toll: Both directions: Tunnel toll as of August 6, 2023, $11.19 (Tolls By Mail and non-New York E-ZPass); $6.94 (New York E-ZPass); $9.11 (Mid-Tier NYCSC E-Z Pass); Manhattan-bound only: Variable congestion charge incurred if exiting onto Trinity Place

Technical
- Length: 9,117 feet (2,779 m)
- No. of lanes: 4
- Operating speed: 40 miles per hour (64 km/h)
- Tunnel clearance: 12 feet 1 inch (3.68 m)

The Hugh L. Carey Tunnel, commonly referred to as the Brooklyn–Battery Tunnel, Battery Tunnel or Battery Park Tunnel, is a tolled tunnel in New York City that connects Red Hook in Brooklyn with the Battery in Manhattan. The tunnel consists of twin tubes that each carry two traffic lanes under the mouth of the East River. Although it passes just offshore of Governors Island, the tunnel does not provide vehicular access to the island. With a length of 9,117 feet (1.73 mi; 2.78 km), it is the longest continuous underwater vehicular tunnel in North America.

Plans for the Brooklyn–Battery Tunnel date back to the 1920s. Official plans to build the tunnel were submitted in 1930 but were initially not carried out. The New York City Tunnel Authority, created in 1936, was tasked with constructing the tunnel. After unsuccessful attempts to secure federal funds, New York City Parks Commissioner Robert Moses proposed a Brooklyn–Battery Bridge. However, the public opposed the bridge plan, and the United States Army Corps of Engineers (USACE) rejected the plan several times out of concern that the bridge would impede shipping access to the Brooklyn Navy Yard. This prompted city officials to reconsider plans for a tunnel. Construction on the Brooklyn–Battery Tunnel started on October 28, 1940, but its completion was delayed due to World War II-related material shortages. The tunnel officially opened on May 25, 1950.

The Brooklyn–Battery Tunnel is part of the Interstate Highway System, carrying the entirety of the unsigned Interstate 478 (I-478) since 1971. The tunnel originally carried New York State Route 27A (NY 27A) until 1970. In 2012, the tunnel was officially renamed after former New York Governor Hugh Carey. It is operated by MTA Bridges and Tunnels as one of the MTA's nine tolled crossings.

== Description ==
The Brooklyn–Battery Tunnel consists of two two-lane tubes, one in each direction. They pass underneath the East River, connecting the Battery at the southern tip of Manhattan to the neighborhood of Red Hook in Brooklyn. Although the tubes do not pass directly under Governors Island, that island contains a ventilation building for the tunnel. Vehicles taller than 12 feet 1 inch (3.68 m) and wider than 8 feet 6 inches (2.59 m) are prohibited from using the tubes. The tubes stretch 9,117 feet (2,779 m) from portal to portal, making them the longest continuous underwater vehicular tunnels in North America. At the time of its opening, the Brooklyn–Battery Tunnel was the longest underwater vehicular tunnel in the US and the second-longest in the world, behind the Queensway tunnel under the River Mersey in the UK. The portals of each tube contain flood doors weighing 20 short tons (18 long tons; 18 t) and measuring 2 feet (0.61 m) thick, 14 feet (4.3 m) across, and 29 feet (8.8 m) tall.

The tunnel was originally commissioned by the New York City Tunnel Authority, whose chief engineer Ole Singstad created the tunnel's original designs. Halfway through construction, the Tunnel Authority was merged into the Triborough Bridge and Tunnel Authority (TBTA), whose chief engineer Ralph Smillie took over the design process. The "Battery" in the tunnel's name refers to an artillery battery originally located at that site during New York City's earliest days. The tunnel was officially renamed after former Governor Hugh Carey in 2012 since he had lived in Brooklyn.

The Brooklyn–Battery Tunnel is owned and operated by the TBTA's successor MTA Bridges and Tunnels, an affiliate agency of the Metropolitan Transportation Authority (MTA). Until 2017, the agency collected tolls at a tollbooth on the Brooklyn side. The tollbooths have been demolished and replaced with electronic toll gantries on the Manhattan side. As of 2016, the tunnel is used by 54,076 vehicles on an average weekday.

=== Associated structures ===
The Brooklyn–Battery Tunnel has a total of four ventilation buildings: two in Manhattan, one in Brooklyn, and one on Governors Island. One of the Manhattan ventilation buildings is granite-faced and designed like a monument due to objections to the building's design during the construction process. The Manhattan ventilation structure was depicted as the men in black's headquarters in the Men in Black movie franchise.

The Governors Island ventilation structure, designed by McKim, Mead & White, is an octagonal building located over the midpoint of the tunnel's route, at its lowest point. According to the MTA, the ventilation buildings can completely replace the tunnel's air every 90 seconds. During construction, tunnel engineers touted the ventilation system as being so efficient that the ventilation towers could blow 25,000 short tons (23,000 t; 22,000 long tons) of clean air into the tunnel every hour. The system consists of 53 fans that each had a diameter of eight feet (2.4 m).

At the Manhattan end, a 2,126-space parking garage sits above the approach to the Brooklyn–Battery Tunnel from the West Side Highway. When the garage opened in 1950, it had 1,050 spaces across seven levels, which were constructed at a cost of $3.5 million (equivalent to $37.1 million in 2025). The parking facility was expanded in 1965–1968 due to its popularity among motorists. The garage was the city's first publicly owned parking lot.

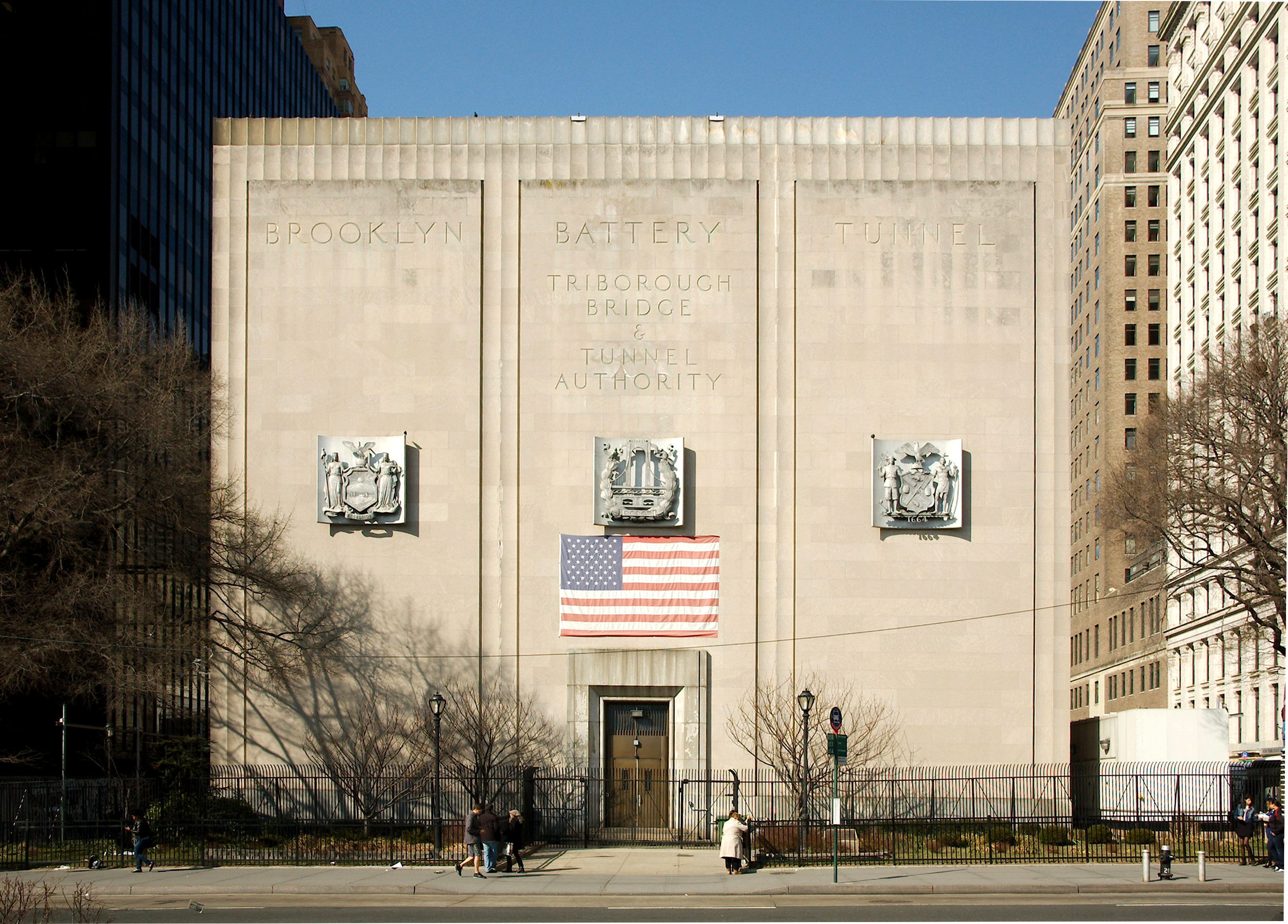
The granite-faced monumental ventilation building on the Manhattan side

=== Transportation ===
The tunnel carries 28 express bus routes that connect Manhattan with Brooklyn or Staten Island. The MTA Bus Company operates the BM1, BM2, BM3, and BM4 between Manhattan and Brooklyn. MTA New York City Transit operates the SIM1, SIM1C, SIM2, SIM3, SIM3C, SIM4, SIM4C, SIM4X, SIM5, SIM6, SIM7, SIM9, SIM10, SIM15, SIM31, SIM32, SIM33, SIM33C, SIM34, and SIM35 routes between Manhattan and Staten Island and the X27, X28, X37, and X38 between Manhattan and Brooklyn.

== History ==
=== Planning ===
A vehicular tunnel under the East River between Manhattan and Brooklyn was proposed by the New York Board of Trade and Transportation in 1925 in response to growing truck traffic congestion in Lower Manhattan. The tunnel would have been located between the Manhattan Bridge and the Brooklyn Bridge. A tunnel that specifically connected the Battery in Manhattan with Red Hook in Brooklyn, passing underneath the East River and Governors Island south of both the Manhattan and Brooklyn bridges, was first proposed by Brooklyn Borough president James J. Byrne in 1926. However, this plan initially did not receive support. Albert Goldman, the New York City Commissioner of Plant and Structures, brought up the plan again in January 1929. In February 1930, the city publicized plans for a six-lane vehicular tunnel from West Street, Manhattan, to Hamilton Avenue, Brooklyn. At the time, ferry service along that path was slow and unreliable. Real-estate speculators believed that land prices along Hamilton Avenue would appreciate as a result of the tunnel's construction and that freight shipments could be delivered to Manhattan faster. The tunnel proposal also entailed widening Hamilton Avenue to 200 feet (61 m) and building a large bridge over the Gowanus Canal, south of the proposed tunnel's entrance.

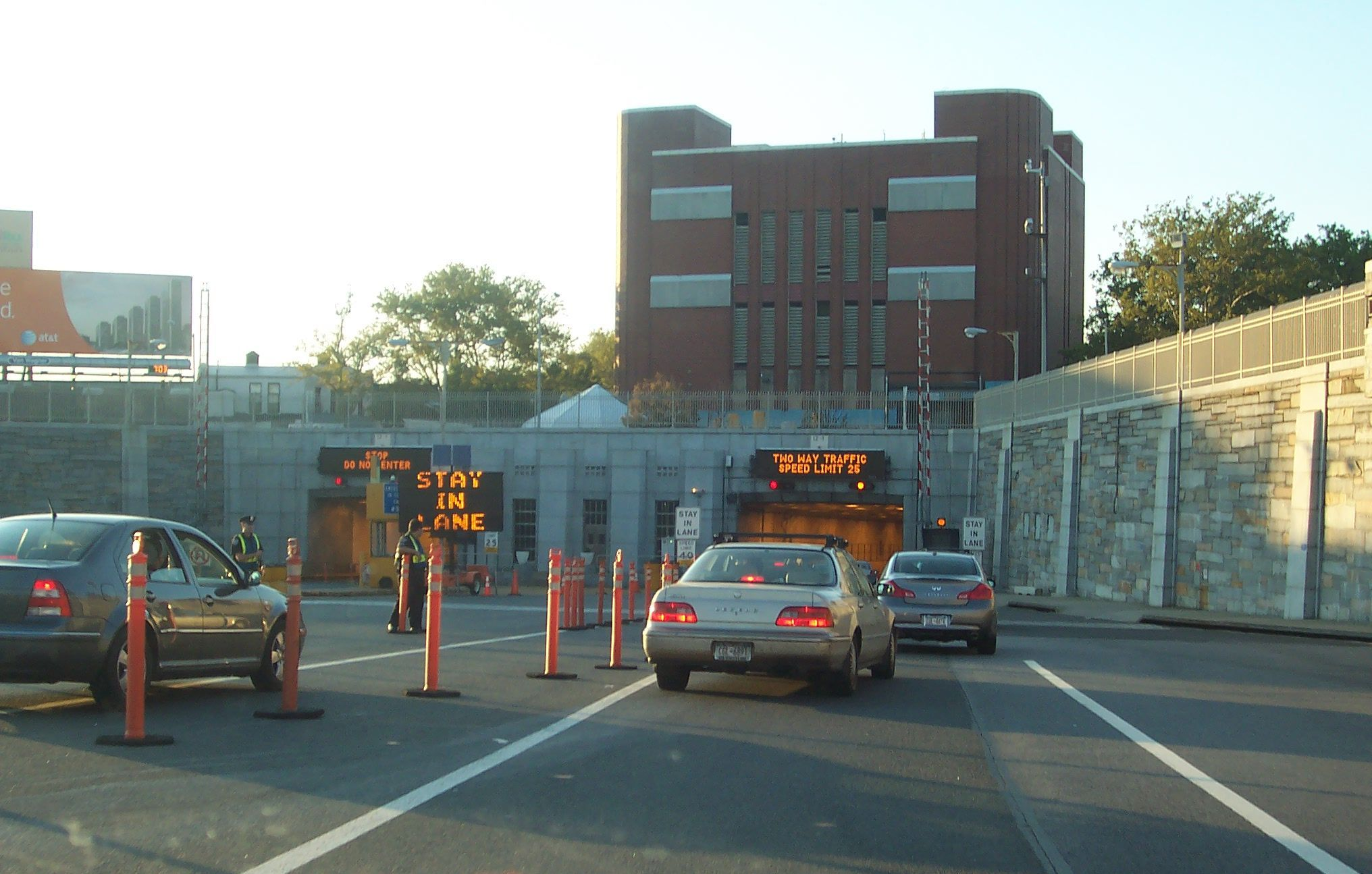
Brooklyn portal in 2008

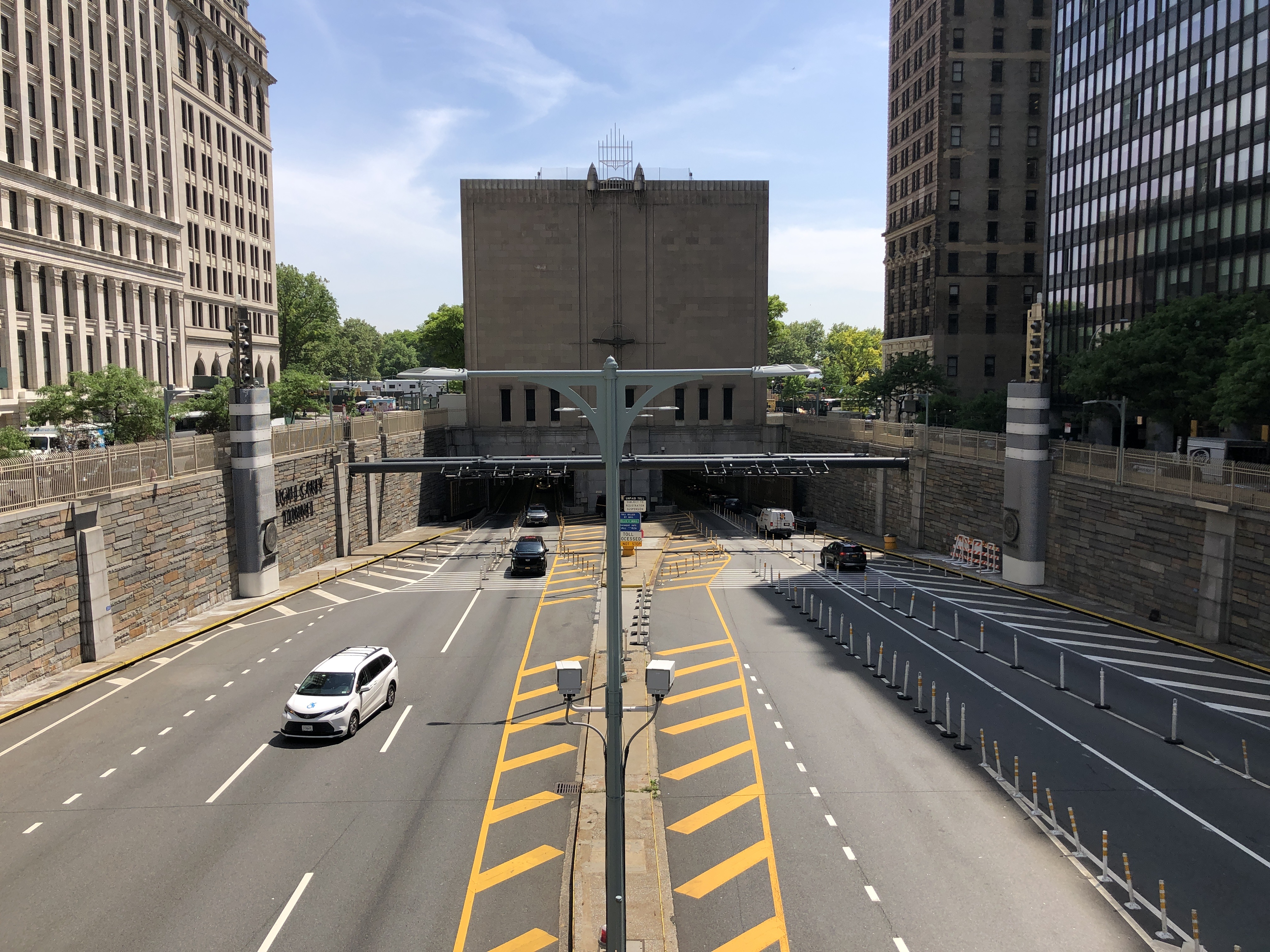
Manhattan portal in 2024

In May 1930, the Terminal Bridge Corporation petitioned the New York City Board of Estimate for permission to build and operate a tunnel under the East River. In November of that year, the Board of Estimate referred the Brooklyn–Manhattan tunnel plan to the New York City Board of Transportation (NYCBOT), who was tasked with surveying the site of the tunnel. At the time, the tunnel would have cost $75 million (equivalent to $1.15 billion in 2025), including land acquisition if it included two three-lane tunnels. The tunnels itself would have cost $58 million (equivalent to $888 million in 2025) if they were three lanes or $50 million (equivalent to $766 million in 2025) if two lanes. The next year, NYCBOT announced that the construction the proposed tunnel was estimated to cost $60 million (equivalent to $1.02 billion in 2025), assuming that the tunnels were 31 feet (9.4 m) in diameter with 21-foot (6.4 m) roadways and a 13.5-foot (4.1 m) clearance. In October 1933, the Board of Estimate approved funding for the tunnel in the city's capital outlay budget for 1934. Two months later, the Board of Estimate approved the Brooklyn–Manhattan tunnel in conjunction with a Staten Island–Brooklyn tunnel under the Narrows. The city was set to ask for $50 million (equivalent to $986 million in 2025) in federal funding, but this request was dropped from the final vote.

Mayor Fiorello La Guardia set up a public-works authority in February 1935 so the city could apply for loans from the federal Public Works Administration (PWA). This authority was set to receive $60 million (equivalent to $1.11 billion in 2025) in funds for the Brooklyn–Manhattan tunnel. The same month, city officials hired temporary workers to survey sites for the proposed tunnel so that they could create a report for the PWA application. Civic groups and Brooklyn politicians petitioned the city to commence construction immediately so traffic congestion could be reduced. However, President Franklin D. Roosevelt had stipulated that PWA funding only be given to projects that could be finished within a year of the grant being awarded. Since the Brooklyn–Manhattan tunnel project would take longer, it and other New York City highway projects were ineligible for PWA funding.

In January 1936, the New York State Legislature created the New York City Tunnel Authority to oversee the construction of a tunnel between Midtown Manhattan and Queens. The bill also provided the authority with the power to build the Brooklyn–Manhattan tunnel if funds became available. By this time, the construction cost of the Brooklyn–Manhattan tunnel was now projected to be $58 million (equivalent to $1.06 billion in 2025). Detailed plans for the tunnel were released in May 1936. The project now consisted of a $60.3-million (equivalent to $1.1 billion in 2025) twin-tube bore from Red Hook, Brooklyn, to the Battery, Manhattan, as well as a $2.3-million (equivalent to $41.9 million in 2025) bridge over the Gowanus Canal. The city approved these plans in January 1936. One civic group wanted to plan for future traffic volumes, so it asked the city to conduct further studies of the Brooklyn–Manhattan tunnel project. The tunnel was officially renamed the "Brooklyn–Battery Tunnel" in July 1936. In November of that year, Brooklyn Borough President Raymond Ingersoll and New York City Parks commissioner Robert Moses revealed a plan to connect the Brooklyn–Battery Tunnel to Long Island's parkway system via a new Gowanus Parkway and Circumferential Parkway. The planned tunnel was also part of the Regional Plan Association's proposed parkway system around New York City. The next month, the New York City Tunnel Authority advertised for bids to create test bores for the tunnel.

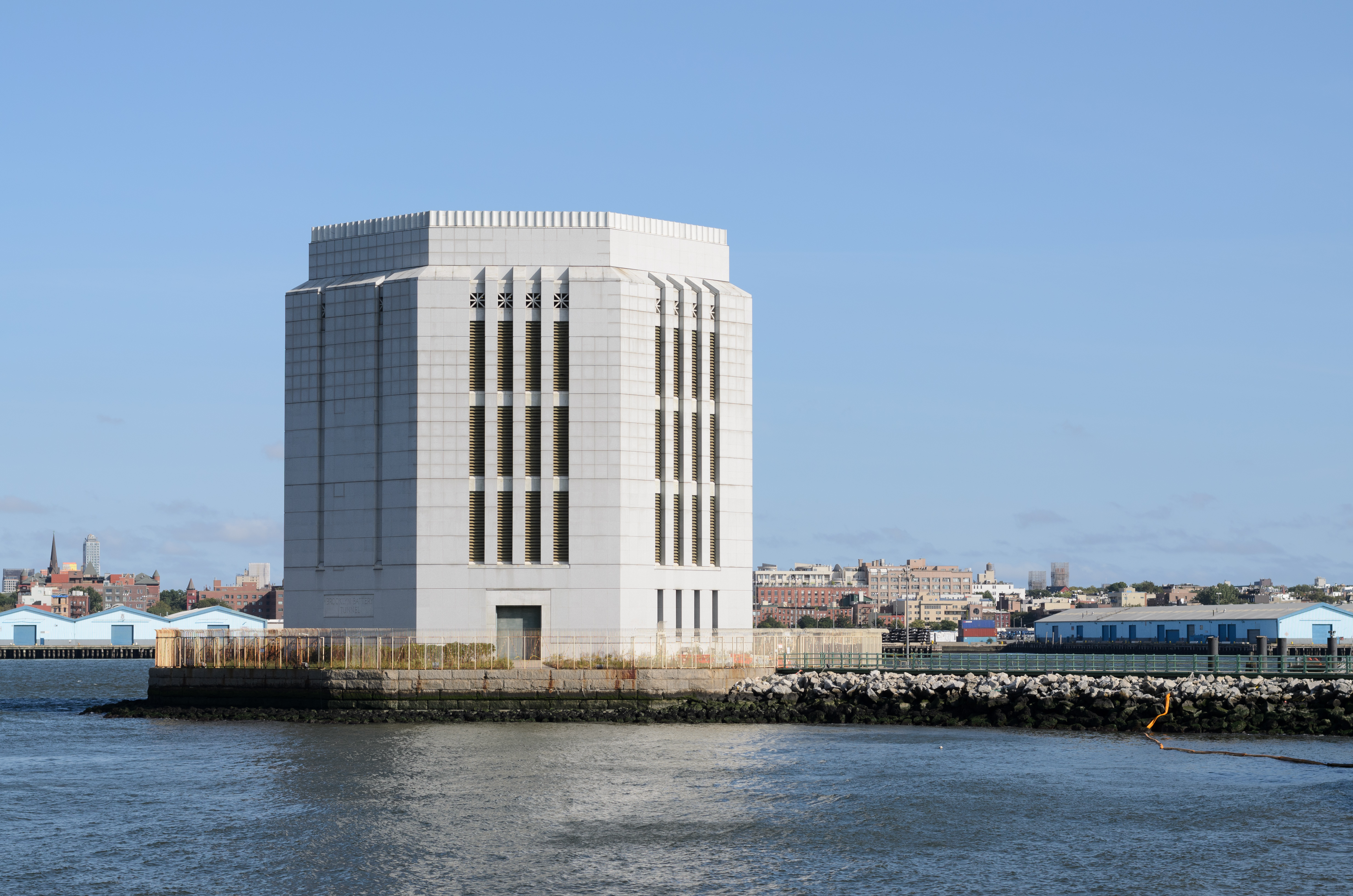
Governors Island vent tower

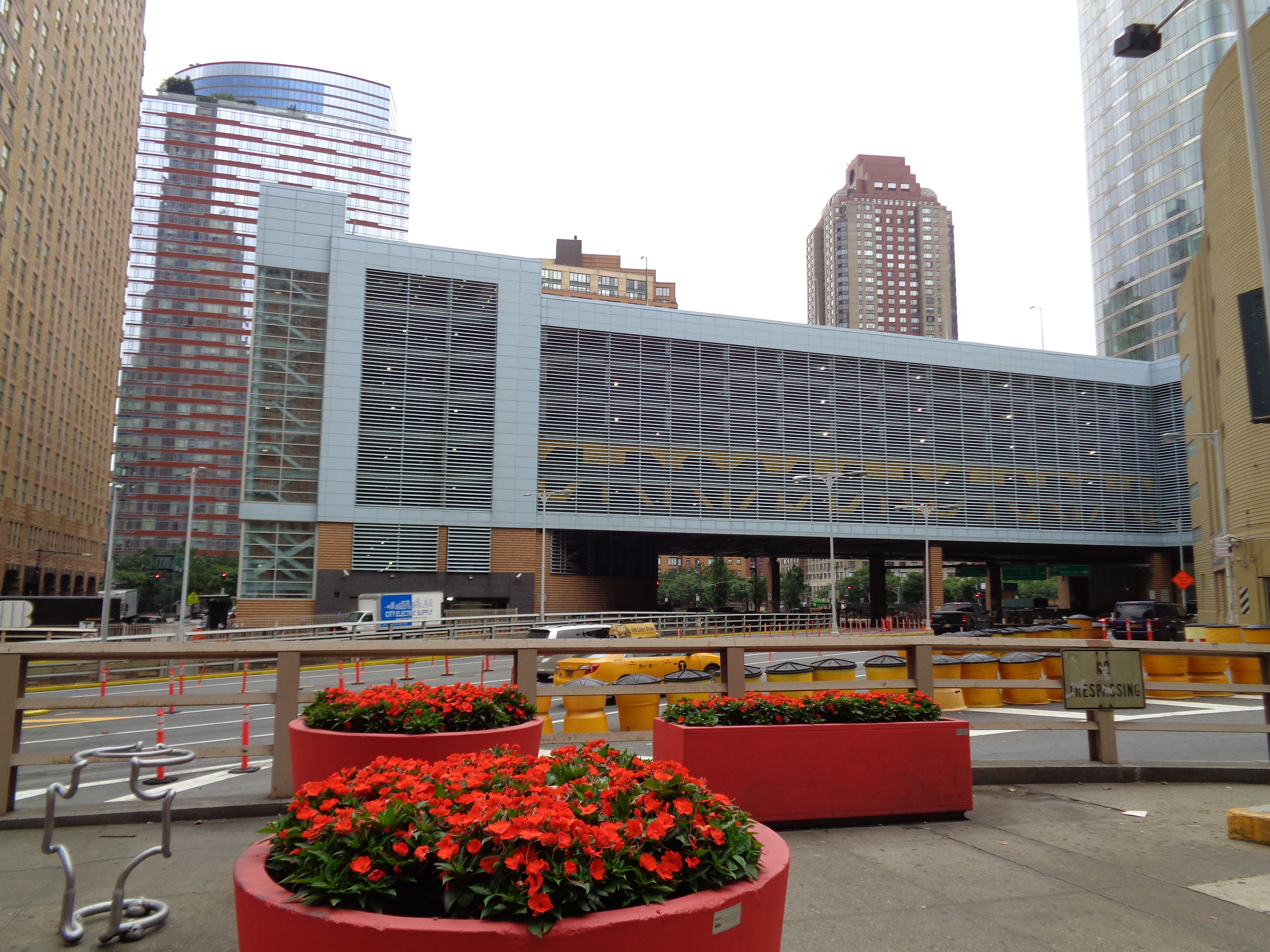
The parking garage above the Brooklyn–Battery Tunnel's Manhattan portal

Copies of the plans for the Brooklyn–Battery Tunnel were submitted to La Guardia's mayoral administration in February 1937. Two tunnels, one in each direction, would connect to the West Side Highway and the FDR Drive on the Manhattan side and to Hamilton Avenue on the Brooklyn side. In the future, the West Side Elevated Highway would be extended from the north, connecting to the new tunnel. There would be a ventilation tower at the midpoint on Governors Island because the tunnels would stretch 8,800 feet (2,700 m) between the two portals, and it was thought that the ventilation towers at either end might not pull in sufficient air. The tunnels would be designed to carry a maximum of 15 million vehicles per year, but it was projected that only nine million would use the tunnels during their first year of operation and that the tunnels would not reach their full capacity for another 16 years. The cost of the project had increased to $70 million (equivalent to $1.23 billion in 2025), and La Guardia wanted a $30-million (equivalent to $527 million in 2025) federal grant so construction could start quickly. A toll of $0.25 per motorist, collected at the Brooklyn end, would help finance the rest of the tunnel and make it profitable. The tunnel would also halve travel time between southern Brooklyn and Lower Manhattan since, at the time, there was no direct route for traffic between these two areas. This, in turn, was expected to expedite cargo deliveries between these areas, thereby reviving Brooklyn's declining cargo industry. The route between Hamilton Avenue and the West Side Highway was determined to be the cheapest route that could be constructed.

Although preliminary borings were set to start in February 1937, USACE officers on Governors Island opposed the placement of a ventilation tunnel there. The Tunnel Authority let contracts for borings in April 1938. The US Army, which held a hearing for public opinions on the tunnel proposal, gave its permission to the tunnel plan in September 1938.

The Tunnel Authority suggested that federal funding could be used to pay for the tunnel and that private financing could also be provided if it was needed. In June 1938, the city requested a $70.9-million (equivalent to $1.27 billion in 2025) PWA grant for the construction of the Brooklyn–Battery Tunnel. The next month, La Guardia met with PWA chair Harold L. Ickes and Reconstruction Finance Corporation (RFC) chair Jesse H. Jones to convince them to help fund the tunnel because the project could now be completed within a year. The city government then published a new financial plan in September 1938, wherein the cost of the tunnel would increase to $77.3 million (equivalent to $1.38 billion in 2025). The city would reduce its request from the PWA by $19.82 million (equivalent to $355 million in 2025) and raise that money by selling bonds instead, and it would also apply for $45 million (equivalent to $806 million in 2025) from the RFC. Manhattan Borough President Stanley M. Isaacs objected to the tunnel plan because he thought the proposal would not be able to adequately handle traffic on the Manhattan side. In response, Parks Commissioner Moses asked Isaacs to think of a better idea to deal with the traffic. Ickes later rejected the city's request for PWA funds, saying that there were "tremendous financial and practical obstacles" for any further PWA involvement. These impediments included a lack of money because, although the PWA had given the city an appropriation for the Belt Parkway, the money had been used up. Due to the PWA's refusal to grant a loan for the Battery Tunnel's construction, the project was temporarily put on hold.

=== Bridge proposal ===
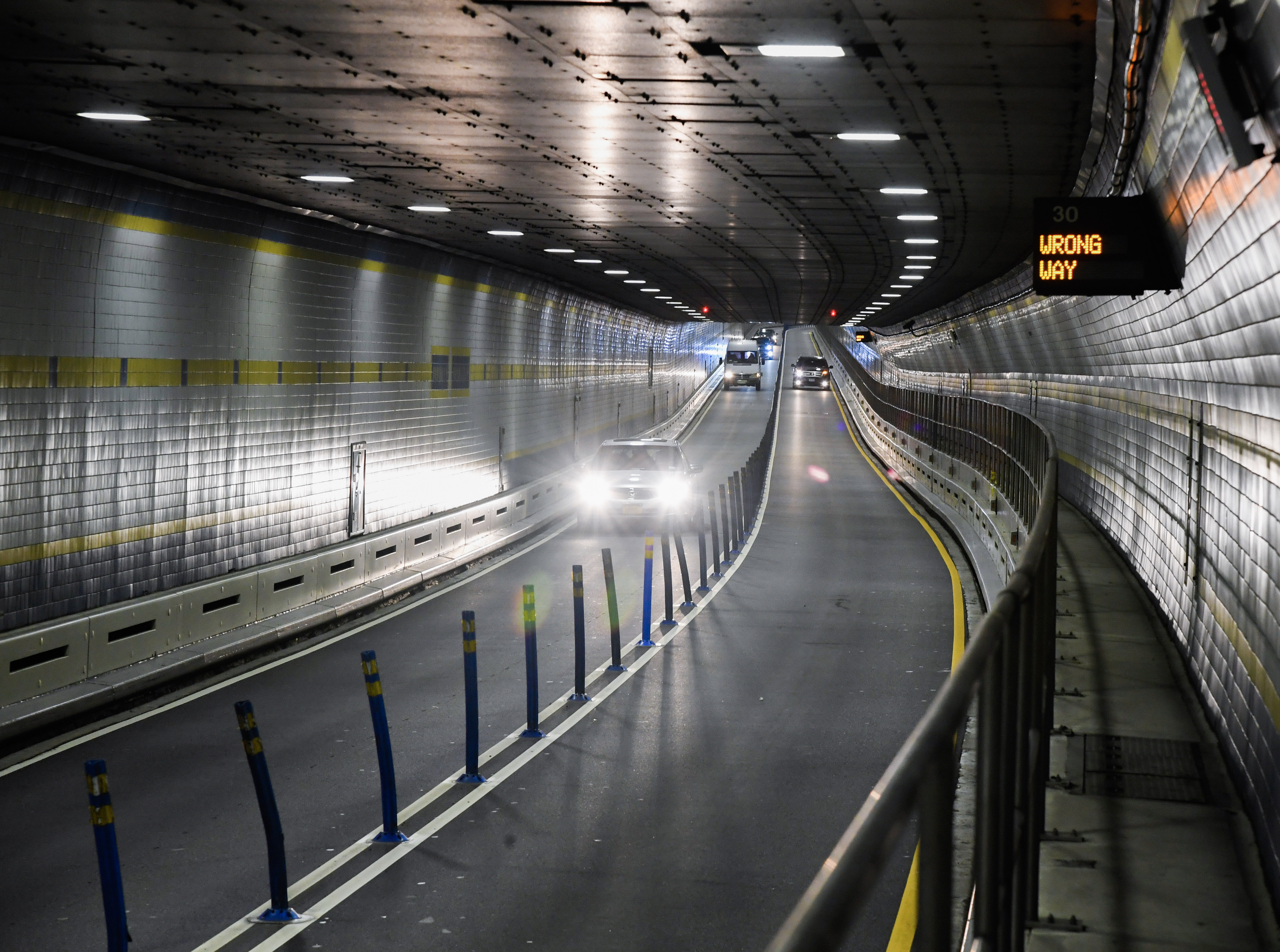
A view of the tunnel

In January 1939, after the failure to allocate federal funds to the tunnels, Moses (now the chair of the Triborough Bridge Authority) proposed the Brooklyn–Battery Bridge. He stated that constructing a bridge would be cheaper, faster, and more efficient than building a tunnel. The bridge would consist of a six-lane tandem suspension bridge span with two back-to-back suspension bridges, and it could be built in 27 months, compared to 46 months for a tunnel. One of the other benefits, in Moses's opinion, was that the $41-million (equivalent to $744 million in 2025) bridge would not require any federal money. Isaacs stated that a bridge would cause as much congestion as a tunnel would, so he did not favor the bridge plan. The Tunnel Authority also opposed the Brooklyn–Battery Bridge because a bridge would lower property values. In response, Moses predicted that the Tunnel Authority's Queens–Midtown Tunnel would not be profitable and that the Tunnel Authority should organize its existing affairs before deciding to build a new tunnel.

Moses was able to garner support for the bridge from influential city and state politicians, including four of five borough presidents, Mayor La Guardia, and US Senator Robert F. Wagner. In early March 1939, the New York City Planning Commission endorsed plans for the Battery Bridge, and a bill for the bridge was moved to a vote in the state legislature. The bill was proposed for a vote in the City Council, but this was blocked due to concerns that the bridge's connection to the East River Drive would not be able to accommodate future traffic volumes. The American Institute of Architects asked that the city reconsider the bridge, as it would obstruct the dramatic view of the Manhattan skyline, reduce the Battery to minuscule size, and destroy the Great New York Aquarium at Castle Clinton. There was significant opposition from the public, and so the City Council Committee on State Legislation did not approve the plan. In response, Moses changed the Brooklyn–Battery Bridge plans to include landscaping work at the Battery. La Guardia believed that if this revised plan were passed, Ickes would finally allocate a PWA grant to the bridge project. On March 28, the City Council voted to approve the bridge project, with 19 members in favor and six opposed. Two days later, both chambers of the New York State Legislature passed bills that permitted the construction of the Brooklyn–Battery Bridge, and Governor Herbert H. Lehman signed the bills within the week.

Moses quickly sought to obtain approval from the US Department of War, which needed to approve the plan. He also started looking for PWA and RFC financing so the bridge could be completed by July 1941. As part of the approval process, the US Army held a public hearing to solicit opinions on the bridge plan. To solidify their opposition to the bridge plans, 17 civic groups formed a committee, and the Municipal Art Society criticized the proposed bridge as an act of "vandalism" toward the city's public parks. Opponents claimed that the bridge would block naval traffic, a suggestion that La Guardia and Moses refuted.

The Department of War ultimately declined to endorse the Brooklyn–Battery Bridge. In May 1939 Robert Woodring, the US Secretary of War, blocked the construction of the bridge due to concerns over the span's potential to become a naval obstruction during a war, since the Brooklyn Navy Yard was located shoreward of the proposed bridge. In response, Moses submitted a revised plan for the bridge and asked the Department of War to reconsider. Moses and Brooklyn politicians declared that they would not accept anything other than an endorsement of the second plan. However, in July, the War Department also rejected the second plan, since the new plan would also pose a wartime hazard. Advocates for the bridge called the rejection a "setback to business". They also discounted the decision as hypocritical since numerous other bridges (including the Manhattan and Brooklyn bridges, which stood between the proposed bridge and the Navy Yard) would also constitute wartime hazards by the Army's reasoning.

Moses continued to support the bridge, praising it as less intrusive and cheaper than a tunnel, despite great public opposition to a bridge. In October, in a last effort to garner official acceptance for the Battery Bridge plan, Moses and La Guardia appealed directly to President Roosevelt to form an independent committee to study the proposal. Moses again revised the plan, adding a ramp to Governors Island so the Army forces could also use the bridge, in a fashion similar to the San Francisco–Oakland Bay Bridge's connection to the Army reservation on Yerba Buena Island in California. However, Roosevelt upheld the Department of War's decision and declined to create such a committee.

=== Tunnel plans finalized ===
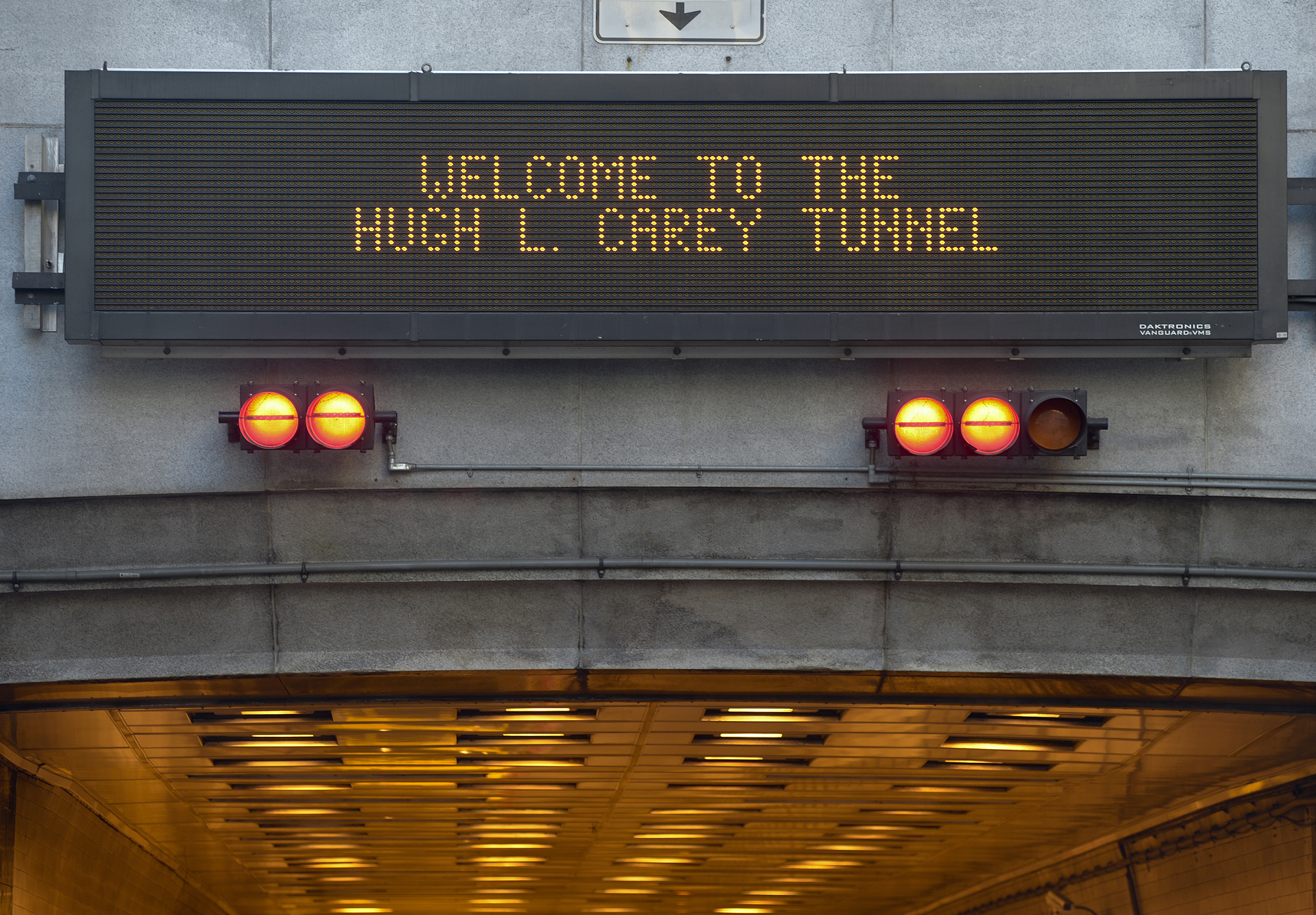
Variable-message sign at the tunnel's entrance

In July 1939, after the bridge plan was canceled, the proposal for the Brooklyn–Battery Tunnel was revisited. Around this time, Roosevelt's administration was considering loosening PWA requirements and lowering interest rates so that the Battery Tunnel could qualify for these funds. By November, La Guardia was arranging to obtain financing for the tunnel, even if it had to come from private sources. After a meeting with La Guardia, RFC chair Jones announced that there were no obstacles to granting a $70-million (equivalent to $1.27 billion in 2025) loan toward the tunnel project. The city was expecting to start construction once the loan was received. The tunnel plans were completed and sent to federal agencies for approval that month.

The New York City Tunnel Authority announced in March 1940 that it would start construction within 40 days. Preliminary construction and land acquisition for the Brooklyn approach was already underway. The Army had already approved the tunnel but, due to a minor change in the plan, had to hold another hearing, and the Army was expected to uphold the permit. In May, La Guardia signed a preliminary contract to start construction. Moses stated that he wanted to complete the tunnel, a crucial link in the Circumferential Parkway System, as soon as possible. The RFC granted the city $57 million (equivalent to $1.02 billion in 2025) for the tunnel project later that month. Ole Singstad, the chief engineer of the New York City Tunnel Authority, was commissioned to design the tunnel. As a cost-saving measure, the Tunnel Authority briefly considered constructing the Brooklyn–Battery Tunnel by digging a trench under the East River and then covering it up.

In mid-1940, 400 Brooklyn residents living in the tunnel's right-of-way were evicted. On the Manhattan side, a large part of Little Syria, a mostly Christian Syrian/Lebanese neighborhood centered around Washington Street, was razed to create the entrance ramps for the tunnel. Many of the shops and residents of Little Syria later moved to Atlantic Avenue in Brooklyn. The city ultimately spent $4 million (equivalent to $71.9 million in 2025) on land acquisition.

=== Construction starts ===
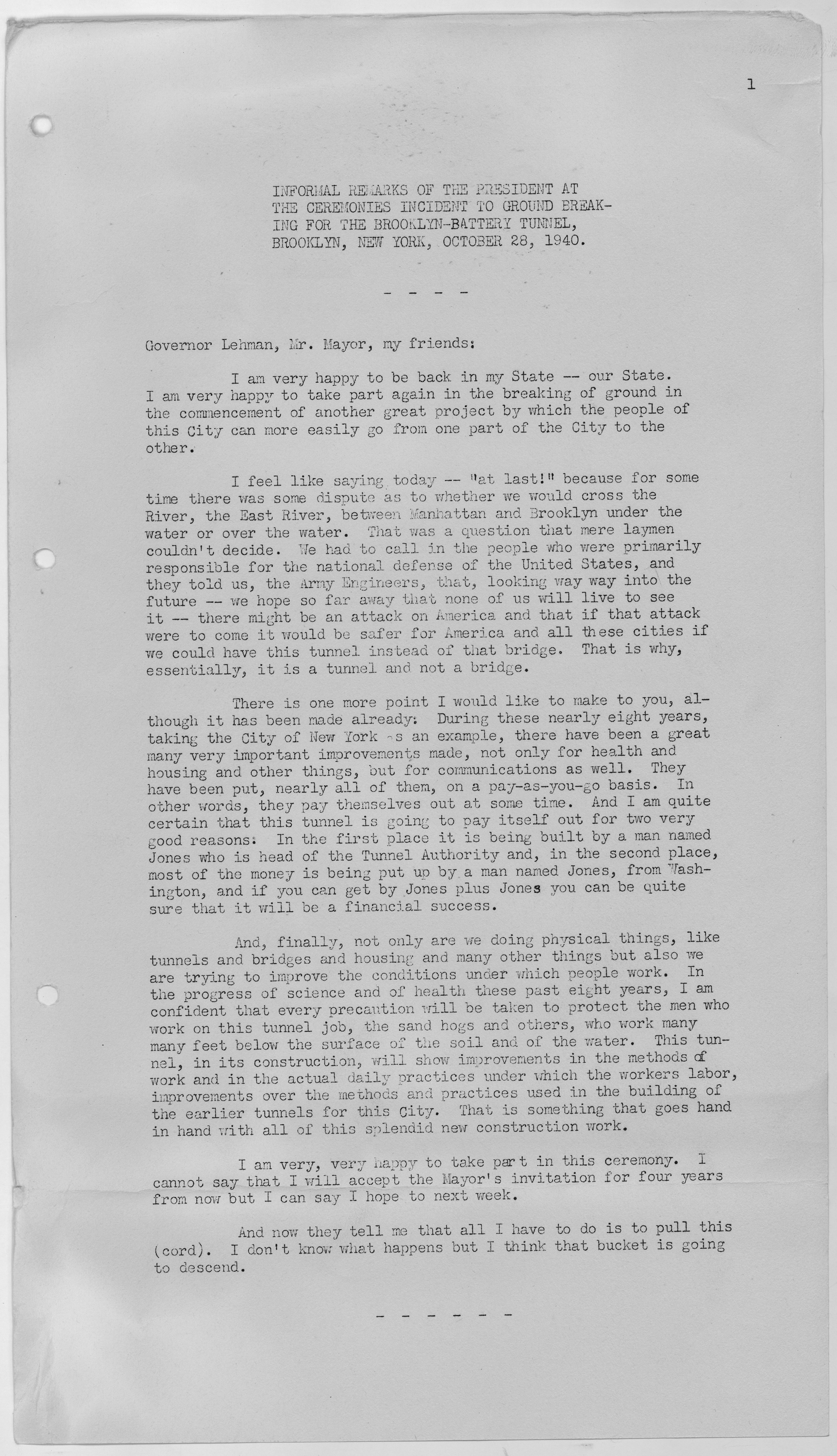
"Informal Remarks At The Ceremonies Incident To Ground Breaking For The Brooklyn–Battery Tunnel", which was read at the Brooklyn–Battery Tunnel's groundbreaking ceremony

The Brooklyn–Battery Tunnel's groundbreaking ceremony was supposed to be held on October 8, 1940, with President Roosevelt in attendance. At the time, the president was in the final weeks of his reelection campaign for the 1940 United States presidential election, and he was expected to campaign at several places around New York City. The groundbreaking was ultimately pushed back to October 28. At the ceremony, Roosevelt extolled the benefits of a tunnel as opposed to a bridge, while Mayor La Guardia invited the president to return for the opening ceremony in four years. Three days later, the city approved a motion to widen Hamilton Avenue from 80 to 300 feet (24 to 91 m) to make way for the Brooklyn tunnel approach, as well as awarded a contract for the tunnel's lining to Bethlehem Steel.

The start of actual tunneling was delayed due to dispute between a dockworkers' union, which was commissioned to dig the tunnel, and a sandhogs' union, which claimed that its members were entitled to work on the project because the sandhogs specialized in building tunnels. This disagreement turned into a violent protest and multiday strike in February 1941. The next year, some union sandhog workers were banned from working on the Battery Tunnel project due to a disagreement with their union's parent union.

Another issue arose when it was revealed that the New York Aquarium at Castle Clinton, at the Battery on the Manhattan side, would need to be demolished to make way for the tunnel. The aquarium considered moving to Coney Island on the southern shore of Brooklyn. To expedite construction of the tunnel, the city closed the Great New York Aquarium and moved its fish to other aquariums in September 1941. Moses advocated for the demolition of Castle Clinton, but preservationists who opposed Moses's proposed action asked federal judge to grant an injunction to prevent demolition. Even though Moses initially had the injunction dismissed, the federal government later designated the castle a US historic monument, which prohibited him from demolishing the castle. The tunnel project would also require demolishing two acres (0.81 ha) of the Battery in order to build a seawall, and, as a result of the downsizing of the Battery, an architect was hired to study the redesign of the park. This, in turn, led to a public competition for potential park redesigns.

In August 1940, the city filed plans for two drawbridges across the Gowanus Canal as part of the Brooklyn–Battery Tunnel approach project. The US Army officially approved plans for the Gowanus Canal bridge in October, just before the tunnel was set to begin construction. The Gowanus bridge's contract was awarded in December 1940. A contract for the Gowanus Parkway approach to the tunnel and bridge was awarded the next month. In mid-1941, planners realized that Hicks Street, on the Brooklyn side, would also need to be widened so that traffic from the north could enter the tunnel, whose Brooklyn portal faced southeast. By May 1942, the Gowanus Parkway was completed between Hicks Street and the Belt Parkway. The parkway also included a bridge over the Gowanus Canal, a fixed span rising 90 feet (27 m) above the waterway before descending to Hicks Street. Construction on an extension of the highway along Hicks Street did not start until 1946.

A new plan for the Manhattan approaches was released in mid-1941. This plan, believed to reduce traffic congestion, consisted of extending the West Side Elevated Highway south to the Battery with a ramp from the southbound highway leading directly into the tunnel. The Battery Park Underpass would be built between the West Side Highway and the FDR Drive. As a result, the approaches to the tunnel would only need to connect to the west side of the Battery, and traffic accessing the North River piers on the West Side would not be interrupted by tunnel traffic. However, this was not the case for traffic from Brooklyn, which would have to go through a traffic light before accessing the ramp for the elevated highway.

The tunnel-boring project consisted of digging two separate bores from each end. Bids for digging the tunnel's shafts from the Brooklyn side were advertised and let the same month. Contracts for boring the tunnels from the Manhattan side were opened in May 1941. The Manhattan contract was awarded to Mason Hangar in October of the same year. A contest for designing the Governors Island ventilation building was also held, and the contract was ultimately given to the architectural firm McKim, Mead & White. The last tunneling project, a contract to dig in either direction from Governors Island until the tubes connected to each other, was advertised in December 1941.

=== Construction halts and restarts ===
The tunnel was originally expected for completion by 1944. La Guardia had promised that, during World War II, the Brooklyn–Battery Tunnel would be given priority status over other construction projects due to its importance to the Brooklyn economy. However, the Battery Tunnel project was not deemed a high-importance destination for steel, so the tunnel's priority status for the receipt of steel was revoked in February 1942. Although digging work continued, the tunnel could not be finished until after the war. In October 1942, Moses recommended that tunnel work be halted completely to conserve steel and other metals that were needed for the war. At this time, the federal War Production Board (WPB) released an order to stop work on the Brooklyn end, although digging from the Manhattan side was allowed to continue because that work consisted solely of digging through solid rock. By the end of the month, the WPB ordered a halt to all construction work on the tunnel's Manhattan end as well. Due to opposition over potentially firing the sandhogs, they were allowed to continue working until a final review of the WPB's action was conducted. At the time, the bores from Manhattan and Brooklyn were in various stages of completion.

By September 1944, the war was winding down and Mayor La Guardia was petitioning the US government to allow the manufacture of washers, nuts, and screws for the Brooklyn–Battery Tunnel construction effort. The federal government gave its permission the next month. During the war, the tunnel shafts had flooded, so they had to be drained first before construction could continue. In mid-1945, after the war ended, the Triborough Bridge Authority was merged with the Tunnel Authority, allowing the new Triborough Bridge and Tunnel Authority (TBTA) to take over the project. Moses, the TBTA head, promptly fired Singstad and replaced him with TBTA Chief Engineer Ralph Smillie, who designed the remainder of the tunnel. The WPB approved the resumption of tunnel work in September of that year. The TBTA advertised for bids to construct the Brooklyn toll plaza in May 1946. Because of objections to the proposed Manhattan ventilation building's design, the TBTA changed the plans so that the tower would look like a granite monument rather than a simple ventilation tower.

Moses directed the tunnel be finished with a different method for finishing the tunnel walls. This resulted in leaking, and, according to Moses biographer Robert Caro, the TBTA fixed the leaks by using a design almost identical to Singstad's original. Singstad later claimed that Smillie had caused "excessive" leakage by not using Singstad's experimental caulking design to prevent leaks. Smillie denied that the leakage was excessive and that Singstad's caulking method had been replaced because that method was actually the cause of the leak.

Workers from both sides continued working on the tunnel, mining caverns until the tubes from each side connected with each other. In July 1947, the eastern tube for future northbound traffic was the first to be holed-through, with workers from each side shaking hands as a small pipe was passed through from one side to another. The pipe was then removed, and the openings covered up, to prevent drastic changes in pressure at either end of the tube. The tunnels from Manhattan and Brooklyn had connected at a point under Governors Island, with an error of 0.375 inches (0.95 cm), and work continued until there was enough assurances that the tunnels had equal pressure readings.

After the tunnel was holed through, the TBTA awarded contracts for the construction of the Governors Island ventilation building. Construction on this ventilation building started in January 1949. The plans for the Brooklyn–Battery Tunnel also included a seven-story parking garage alongside the Manhattan portal, which broke ground in August 1948. The garage was slated to be the first publicly owned parking complex in the city, and so the city government proposed offering lower parking rates compared to privately owned garages.

The Brooklyn–Battery Tunnel was slated to be connected with several parkways and highways on either side, which were built in tandem with the tunnel. On the Brooklyn side, the Brooklyn–Queens Expressway was under construction, providing a connector to the tunnel from the north. Although it was substantially complete by December 1948, the expressway could not open until the tunnel was complete. On the Manhattan side, the southernmost section of the West Side Elevated Highway, which connected to the Battery and the future tunnel, opened in November 1948. An extension of the East River Drive (by now renamed the FDR Drive) to the future Battery Park Underpass and Brooklyn–Battery Tunnel was approved in 1949. Eventually, the Brooklyn–Battery Tunnel was also slated to connect to the Verrazzano–Narrows Bridge to Staten Island. However, the Battery Park Underpass was not expected to be completed until 1952, and the FDR Drive extension would take even longer to be completed. Additionally, although a direct ramp from the Brooklyn-bound tunnel to the northbound Brooklyn–Queens Expressway was planned, construction was being delayed due to the difficulty of evicting tenants within the path of the ramp. Moreover, the Verrazzano–Narrows Bridge could not be financed, let alone started, until the Brooklyn–Battery Tunnel was completed.

Due to extra costs caused by delays and striking sandhogs, the authority petitioned the RFC for $14 million (equivalent to $158 million in 2025) in funds in August 1947, and, in December of the same year, asked for another $2 million (equivalent to $22.6 million in 2025). In February 1948, the RFC agreed to extend another $28 million (equivalent to $299 million in 2025) toward the completion of the tunnel. By mid-1948, the tunnel was 70 percent complete, despite material shortages and cost overruns, and was expected to open to traffic in early 1950. Work on the tunnel progressed, and the tunnel was 94 percent complete by late 1949. A reporter for the Brooklyn Eagle made an unsanctioned drive between the two ends of the tunnel, noting that tiles, lighting, and a road surface had yet to be added, although the bores themselves were complete. The tubes included four fluorescent-lighting installations with a total of 5,776 bulbs. At the time, it comprised the world's largest continuous fluorescent installation in the world and was the first crossing in the city to have fluorescent lights. The strips of clay tiles on the tubes' ceilings were advertised as the US's longest continuous uses of clay tiles.

=== Opening ===
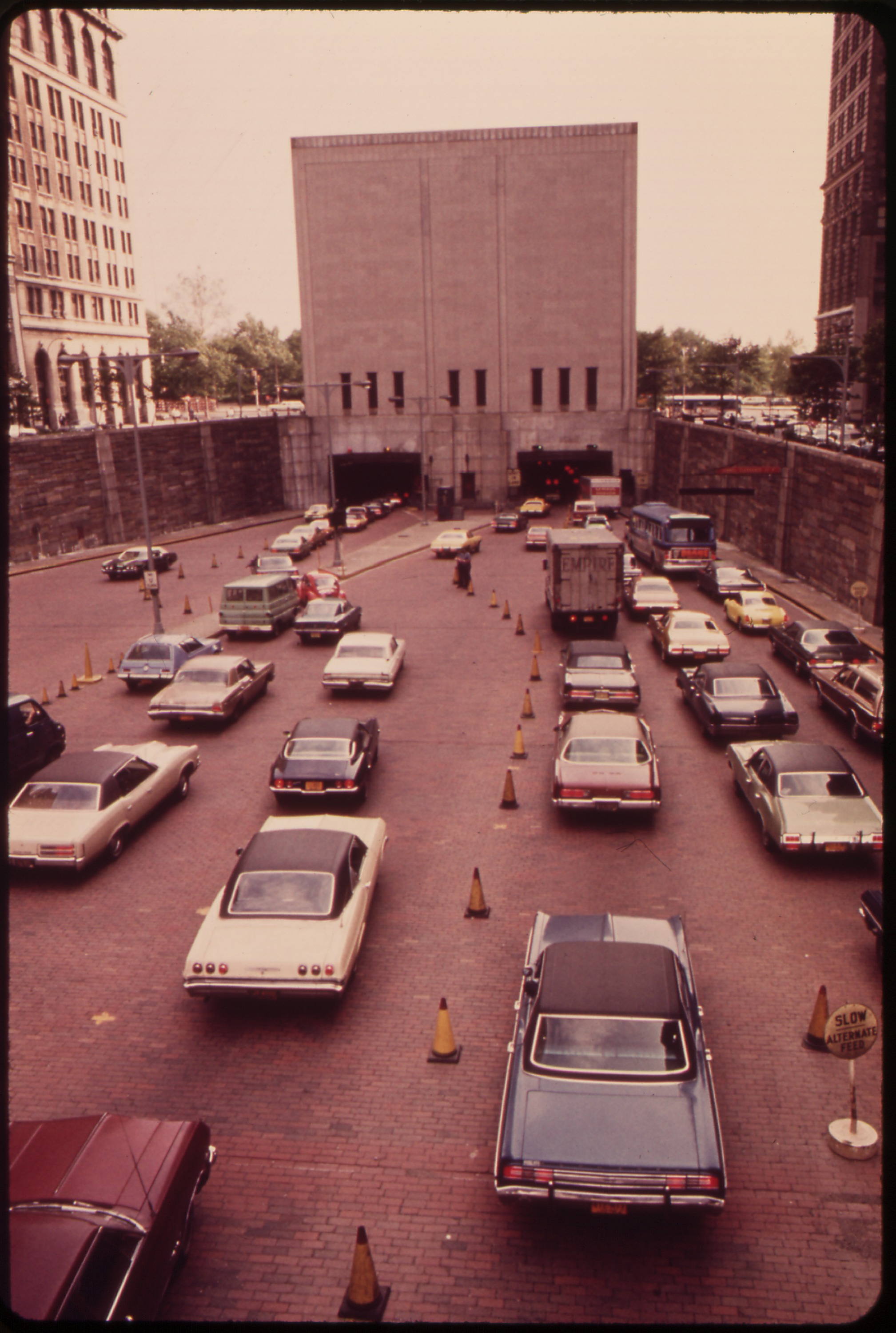
The tunnel, seen in 1973

The Brooklyn–Battery Tunnel opened to traffic on May 25, 1950, with a ceremony officiated by Mayor William O'Dwyer. Part of the Brooklyn-Queens Expressway, along Hicks Street from the Battery Tunnel north to Atlantic Avenue, opened the same day. At the time, the Brooklyn Eagle described the Battery Tunnel as "the nation's largest, most modern underwater vehicular tunnel", which took three minutes to traverse from end to end. The Eagle also estimated that the tunnel cost $736 per inch ($290/cm) (equivalent to $7,800 per inch ($3,100/cm) in 2025) that was built. With a cost of $80 million (equivalent to $848 million in 2025), the Brooklyn–Battery Tunnel was also dubbed the most expensive tunnel in the United States. It was expensive enough that the TBTA had been forced to look around the world for a company that could cover the tunnel's $33.5-million (equivalent to $355 million in 2025) insurance policy. However, the cost was expected to be counterbalanced, in part, through the $0.35 tolls and the time savings afforded. Truckers at Bush Terminal, located south of the tunnel's portal, predicted that they would save 35 minutes a day and $1 million (equivalent to $10.6 million in 2025) a year by driving through the tunnel.

Within the first five and a half hours of its opening, 10,563 motorists had paid a toll to use the tunnel. Within the first day, 40,000 motorists used the tunnel, and, at that rate, it was estimated that the tunnel might see 14 million vehicles per year, 40 percent more than originally estimated. This was in spite of the fact that traffic speeds were limited to 40 mph (64 km/h), which reduced throughput. The 1,050-spot garage above the tunnel's northern portal opened a little more than a month after the tunnel opened. During the Battery Tunnel's first year of operation, the tunnel grossed nearly $5.5 million (equivalent to $58.3 million in 2025) in toll revenues, and, according to Caro, exceeded its 15-million-annual-vehicle capacity. Another analysis by the Brooklyn Eagle found that 13.86 million vehicles had used the tunnel in its first year; this was lower than Caro's estimate but higher than both the TBTA's initial estimate of 10 million vehicles per year and expert forecasts of eight million annual vehicles.

Some road infrastructure projects at both ends of the tunnel were completed shortly after the tunnel opened. The first associated project to be completed was the Battery Park Underpass on the Manhattan side, which opened in April 1950. Two months later, officials opened a ramp on the Brooklyn side, which led from the southbound tunnel lanes to the northbound Brooklyn–Queens Expressway. The Battery Park Underpass was connected to the FDR Drive elevated viaduct, and thus to the FDR Drive, in May 1954. The Brooklyn–Battery Tunnel project also entailed the restoration of Battery Park, which reopened in 1952 after a 12-year shutdown.

=== Later years ===
The tubes were designed for two lanes in each direction. This was changed in 1956, when the Brooklyn-bound western tube was changed to handle bidirectional traffic during morning rush hours, owing to heavy rush-hour traffic congestion. A northbound high-occupancy vehicle lane (HOV lane) was later added during the morning rush hours. It led from Staten Island to Manhattan via the Verrazzano–Narrows Bridge, the Gowanus Expressway, and the Battery Tunnel. A large volume of tunnel drivers also used the garage on the Manhattan side, so in 1965, plans were made to expand the garage. The expanded garage, which was completed in 1968, had 2,126 spots. The city also built a new 278-spot garage nearby for short-term parking.

In 1957, workers performing maintenance on the tunnel observed that the tiled ceiling in the Brooklyn–Battery Tunnel was leaking. About 10,000 ft^{2} (930 m^{2}) of the 360,000 ft^{2} (33,000 m^{2}) of ceiling was found to have corroded. The TBTA restored the tubes' ceilings starting in 1959 at a cost of $250,000 (equivalent to $2.11 million in 2025).

In 1971, the Brooklyn–Battery Tunnel was designated Interstate 478 in preparation for the "Westway" project, which would reconstruct the West Side Highway to Interstate Highway standards. Although the project was canceled in 1985, the I-478 designation still exists and is contiguous with the entirety of the Brooklyn–Battery Tunnel. However, I-478 is not posted on any public signage. Under an agreement with Verizon Wireless, the Brooklyn–Battery Tunnel received cellular service in 1995.

During the September 11 attacks, Czech tourist Pavel Hlava captured footage of American Airlines Flight 11's crash into North Tower of the World Trade Center while preparing to enter the Brooklyn–Battery Tunnel. Following the attacks, the tunnel was closed completely due to the proximity of the Manhattan portal to the World Trade Center site. Although many major crossings within the city were also closed following the attacks, they reopened relatively quickly, albeit with HOV restrictions during rush hours. The western tube of the Brooklyn–Battery Tunnel was the first part of the tunnel to reopen, in October 2001, and carried only southbound traffic. However, the West Side Highway was closed to traffic south of Canal Street, some 30 blocks north of the tunnel portal, and part of the highway had been destroyed during the attacks. Consequently, officials feared that traffic in the tunnel would be backed up at least 40 blocks if the highway was reopened. As a result, work started on a temporary roadway leading from the highway to the tunnel. The northbound tube, which reopened in March 2002, was the last crossing into Manhattan to reopen.

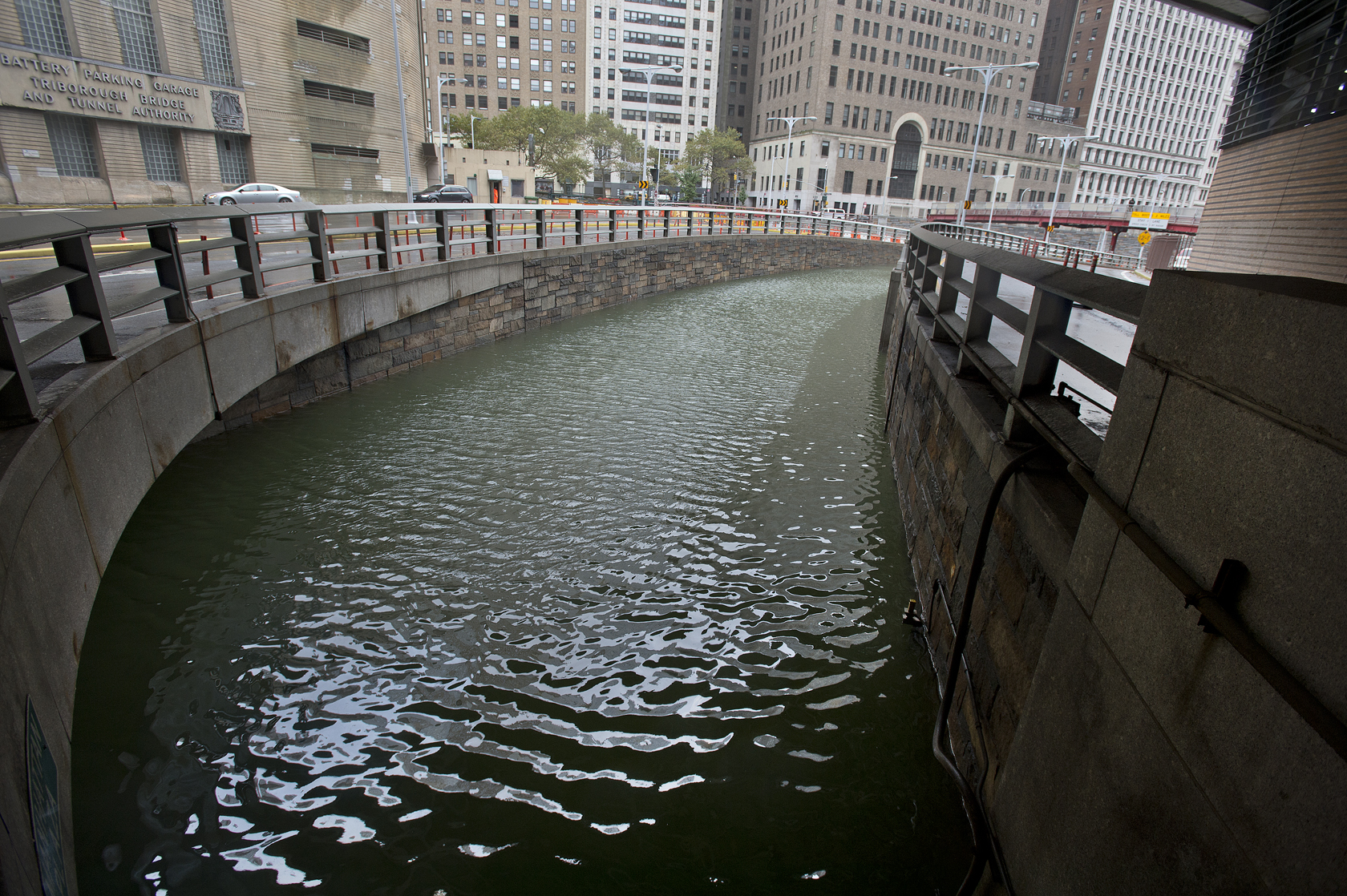
During Hurricane Sandy

In 2010, New York State legislators voted to rename the Brooklyn–Battery Tunnel after former Governor Hugh Carey. The tunnel was officially renamed the Hugh L. Carey Tunnel on October 22, 2012. Less than a week after the tunnel was officially renamed, it was closed in preparation for Hurricane Sandy, marking the first-ever weather-related-closure for the tunnel. It was subsequently flooded after a severe storm surge. The Hugh L. Carey Tunnel reopened on November 13 following a cleanup process that included the removal of an estimated 86 million US gallons (330×10^{6} L; 72×10^{6} imp gal) of water. It was the last New York City river crossing to reopen.

The flooding resulting from Hurricane Sandy demonstrated how floodprone the tunnel was, since the sea level around the tunnel had risen nine inches (23 cm) since its opening in 1951, and the portals are located on land very close to sea level. The MTA subsequently began testing inflatable dams at the tunnel's portals. In October 2017, a pair of 25-short-ton (23 t; 22-long-ton) floodgates were installed on the Manhattan-side openings of the Hugh L. Carey Tunnel. The Manhattan floodgates were supposed to be accompanied by a pair on the Brooklyn side, as well as a seawall. This combined project was 63 percent complete as of a March 2018 MTA report. In 2017–2018, the tiled walls in the Queens–Midtown and Brooklyn–Battery tunnels were replaced due to damage suffered during Hurricane Sandy. The retiled white walls have gold-and-blue stripes, representing the official state colors of New York. Controversy arose over the cost of retiling the tunnels, which cost a combined $30 million (equivalent to $37.8 million in 2025), because of the ongoing transit crisis at the time.

On September 28, 2023, an 18-wheel tractor entered the Brooklyn-bound tunnel, traveling the wrong way to Manhattan, and got stuck inside the tunnel, backing up traffic for several hours.

== Tolls ==
As of January 4, 2026, drivers pay $12.03 per car or $5.06 per motorcycle for tolls by mail and vehicles with out-of-state E-ZPasses. E-ZPass users with transponders issued by the New York E‑ZPass Customer Service Center pay $7.46 per car or $3.25 per motorcycle. Mid-Tier NYCSC E-ZPass users pay $9.79 per car or $4.18 per motorcycle.

The E-ZPass toll payment system has been accepted at the Brooklyn–Battery Tunnel since December 1996. Open-road cashless tolling started on January 4, 2017. The tollbooths were demolished, and replaced by cameras and E-ZPass readers mounted to overhead gantries at the Manhattan end of the tunnel.. A vehicle without E-ZPass has a picture taken of its license plate and a bill for the toll is mailed to its owner. For E-ZPass users, sensors detect their transponders wirelessly.

=== Historical tolls ===
Historical passenger tolls for the Brooklyn–Battery Tunnel (Note: This table lists the peak tolls for two-axle vehicles. Motorcycle tolls and off-peak tolls are lower, and tolls for vehicles with additional axles are higher.)
Years	Toll		Toll equivalent in 2025		Ref.
Years	Cash	E-ZPass	Cash	E-ZPass	Ref.
1950–1972	$0.35	—N/a	$2.69–4.68	—N/a	
1972–1975	$0.70	—N/a	$4.19–5.39	—N/a	
1975–1980	$0.75	—N/a	$2.93–4.49	—N/a	
1980–1982	$1.00	—N/a	$3.34–3.91	—N/a	
1982–1984	$1.25	—N/a	$3.87–4.17	—N/a	
1984–1986	$1.50	—N/a	$4.49–4.41	—N/a	
1986–1987	$1.75	—N/a	$4.96–5.14	—N/a	
1987–1989	$2.00	—N/a	$5.19–5.67	—N/a	
1989–1993	$2.50	—N/a	$5.57–6.49	—N/a	
1993–1996	$3.00	—N/a	$6.16–6.69	—N/a	
1996–2003	$3.50	$3.50	$6.13–7.18	$6.13–7.18	
2003–2005	$4.00	$4.00	$6.59–7.00	$6.59–7.00	
2005–2008	$4.50	$4.00	$6.73–7.42	$5.98–6.59	
2008–2010	$5.00	$4.15	$7.38–7.48	$6.13–6.21	
2010–2015	$6.50	$4.80	$8.83–9.60	$6.52–7.09	
2015–2017	$8.00	$5.54	$10.51–10.87	$7.28–7.52	
2017–2019	$8.50	$5.76	$10.70–11.16	$7.25–7.57	
2019–2021	$9.50	$6.12	$11.29–11.96	$7.27–7.71	
2021–2023	$10.17	$6.55	$10.75–12.08	$6.92–7.78	
2023–2026	$11.19	$6.94	$11.19–11.82	$6.94–7.33	
2026–present	$12.03	$7.46	$12.03	$7.46	

=== Congestion toll ===
Congestion pricing in New York City was implemented in January 2025. Drivers who enter Manhattan via the tunnel pay a second toll if they exit onto Trinity Place. The congestion charges are collected via E-ZPass and tolls-by-mail. The charges vary based on time of day and vehicle class, but the congestion toll is charged once per day. Drivers who use the Brooklyn–Battery Tunnel to enter the congestion zone receive a $1.50 credit toward the congestion charge during the day, and pay a discounted toll at night. Drivers who use the tunnel and then remain on the FDR Drive or West Side Highway south of 60th Street are exempt from the congestion toll.

== Interstate 478 ==
Interstate 478

Route information
- Maintained by MTA Bridges and Tunnels
- Length: 2.14 mi (3.44 km)
- Existed: 1971–present
- NHS: Entire route
- Restrictions: No hazardous goods

Major junctions
- South end: I-278 in Red Hook
- North end: NY 9A / West Side Highway / FDR Drive in Battery Park City

Location
- Country: United States
- State: New York
- Counties: Kings, New York

Highway system
- Interstate Highway System; Main; Auxiliary; Suffixed; Business; Future; New York Highways; Interstate; US; State; Reference; Parkways
← NY 474	→ I-481

The segments of I-78 and its auxiliaries in New York City and Nassau County that were built (black), canceled segments (dark red), and segments that were canceled with multiple different proposed routings (light red, of which all in Manhattan were proposals for I-478).

I-478 is the official route designation for the Brooklyn–Battery Tunnel and its approaches, although it is not signed as such. I-478's south end is at the tunnel's south end, I-278 in Brooklyn, and the highway extends 2.14 miles (3.44 km) to the tunnel's north end at NY 9A (West Street) in Lower Manhattan. The entirety of I-478 is concurrent with the tunnel. Before receiving the I-478 designation, the tunnel had been part of NY 27A from the 1950s to 1970. NY 27A still exists, but, since 1970, it only runs within eastern Long Island.

The I-478 number was originally considered for other routes. In 1958, the I-478 route number was proposed for the Lower Manhattan Expressway branch along the Manhattan Bridge. This highway would have run between I-78 (which would have split to another branch that used the Williamsburg Bridge) and I-278. After the Lower Manhattan Expressway project was canceled in March 1971, the I-478 designation was also briefly proposed for an upgrade of the Grand Central Parkway between I-278 and I-678, as part of an effort to upgrade the Belt Parkway with truck lanes. This proposal was also canceled in May 1971.

The Westway project was proposed in early 1971 as part of an effort to replace the West Side Elevated Highway, a narrow and dangerously obsolete structure on Manhattan's west side. By mid-1971, the I-478 designation had been moved over to the Westway project. As originally planned, I-478 would have continued north to I-78 at the Holland Tunnel and I-495 at the Lincoln Tunnel via the Westway project. An extension to I-95 at the George Washington Bridge via the Henry Hudson Parkway was initially considered. This was ultimately dropped from the final plan due to a state law that prohibited the conversion of the Henry Hudson Parkway to an Interstate Highway. The project was approved by the US government in 1977.

If fully completed, I-478 would have run along the Brooklyn–Battery Tunnel and West Side Highway, completing the portion of the Interstate Highway System within New York City. However, the Westway project was officially abandoned in 1985 after a series of lawsuits from environmental advocates. Although the I-478 designation was formally withdrawn from all public signage and plans, the route number still applies to the Brooklyn–Battery Tunnel, albeit as an unsigned highway that is not marked on public signs.

=== Exit list ===
County	Location	mi	km	Exit	Destinations	Notes
Brooklyn	Red Hook	0.0	0.0	–	I-278 west (Brooklyn–Queens Expressway) to Belt Parkway east – Verrazzano Bridge	Southern terminus; former NY 27A
Brooklyn	Red Hook	0.1	0.16	–	HOV3+ to Verrazzano Bridge / Belt Parkway east	Southbound exit evenings, northbound entrance mornings
Brooklyn	Red Hook	0.2	0.32	26	Hamilton Avenue (I-278 Alt. east)	No northbound exit; exit no. corresponds to I-278
Brooklyn	Red Hook	0.4	0.64	–	I-278 east (Brooklyn–Queens Expressway) / Atlantic Avenue	Southbound exit only; exit 25 on I-278
East River		0.5– 2.2	0.80– 3.5	Hugh L. Carey Tunnel (toll)		
Manhattan	Battery Park City	2.3	3.7	–	Trinity Place	Northbound exit and southbound entrance
Manhattan	Battery Park City	2.4	3.9	–	NY 9A north (West Street) / FDR Drive north – Holland Tunnel, Lincoln Tunnel, East Side, Staten Island Ferry	Northern terminus; at-grade intersection; exit 2 on West Side Highway
1.000 mi = 1.609 km; 1.000 km = 0.621 mi: Electronic toll collection; HOV only; Incomplete access
