= West Side Highway =

Boulevard in Manhattan, New York

West Side Highway
- Joe DiMaggio Highway
- West Side Highway highlighted

Route information
- Length: 5.42 mi (8.72 km)
- Existed: 2001–present
- Component highways: NY 9A entire length
- Restrictions: No commercial vehicles on freeway section

Major junctions
- South end: I-478 Toll / FDR Drive / Battery Place in Battery Park City
- North end: NY 9A / Henry Hudson Parkway in Hell's Kitchen

Location
- Country: United States
- State: New York

Highway system
- New York Highways; Interstate; US; State; Reference; Parkways

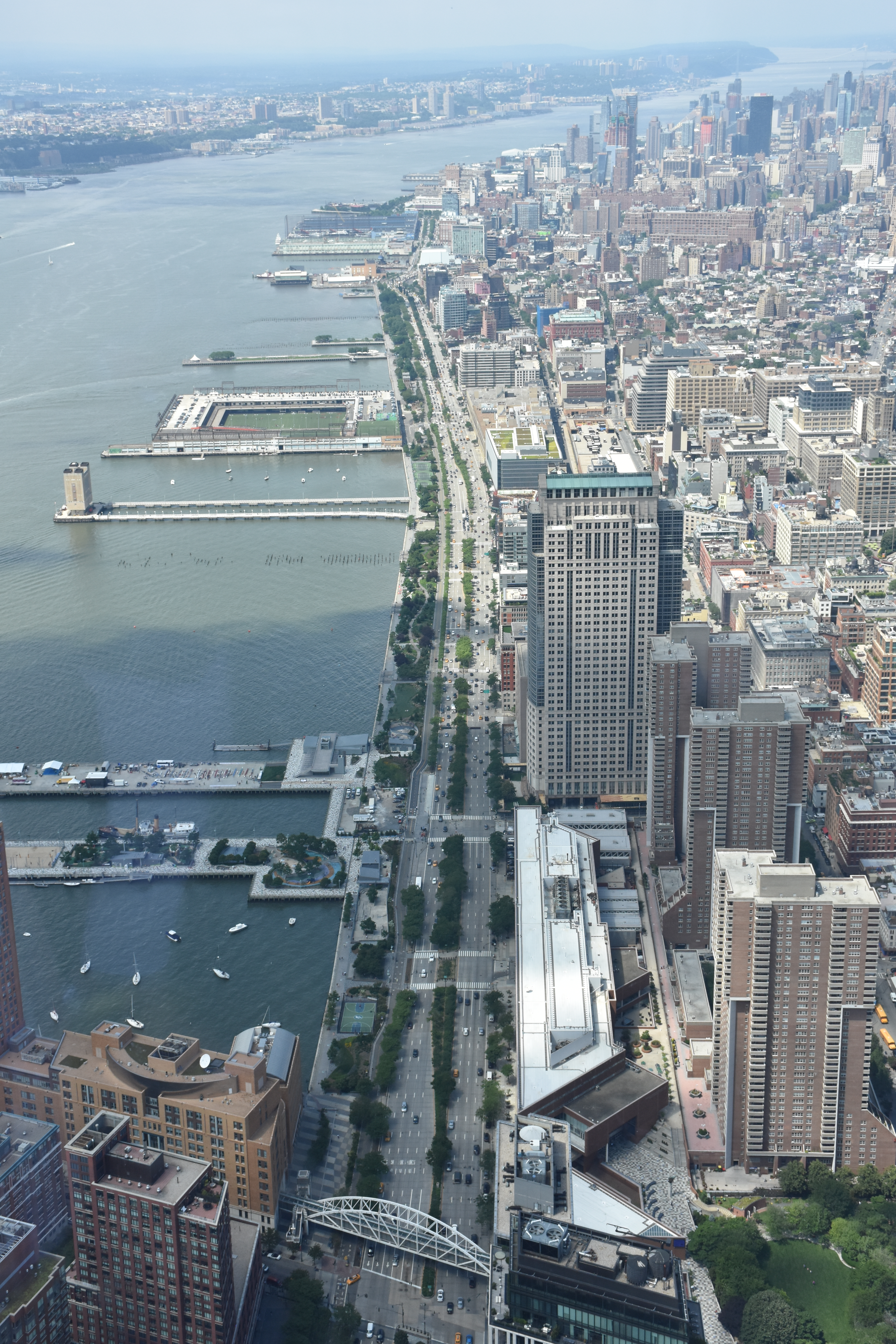
View from One World Trade Center

The Joe DiMaggio Highway, commonly called the West Side Highway and formerly the Miller Highway, is a 5.42-mile-long (8.72 km) mostly surface section of New York State Route 9A (NY 9A), running from West 72nd Street along the Hudson River to the southern tip of Manhattan in New York City. It replaced the West Side Elevated Highway, built between 1929 and 1951, which was shut down in 1973 due to neglect and lack of maintenance, and was dismantled by 1989. North of 72nd Street, the roadway continues as the Henry Hudson Parkway.

The current highway was complete by 2001, but required reconstruction after the September 11 attacks that year, when the collapse of the World Trade Center caused debris to fall onto the surrounding areas, damaging the highway. It uses the surface streets that existed before the elevated highway was built: West Street, Eleventh Avenue and Twelfth Avenue. A short section of Twelfth Avenue still runs between 125th and 138th Streets, under the Riverside Drive Viaduct. Eleventh Avenue is a separate street north of 22nd Street. The portion between West 42nd Street and Canal Street is part of the Lincoln Highway.

== Route description ==
The highway is a six-to-eight lane urban boulevard, with the northernmost section, from 59th Street to 72nd Street (signed as the Henry Hudson Parkway), a freeway elevated above a former rail yard adjacent to tracks still used by Amtrak. Trucks and buses are allowed only on the surface section. The West Side Highway's surface section takes three names: West Street from the Battery Park Underpass north to Tenth Avenue, then Eleventh Avenue to 22nd Street, and finally Twelfth Avenue to 72nd Street.

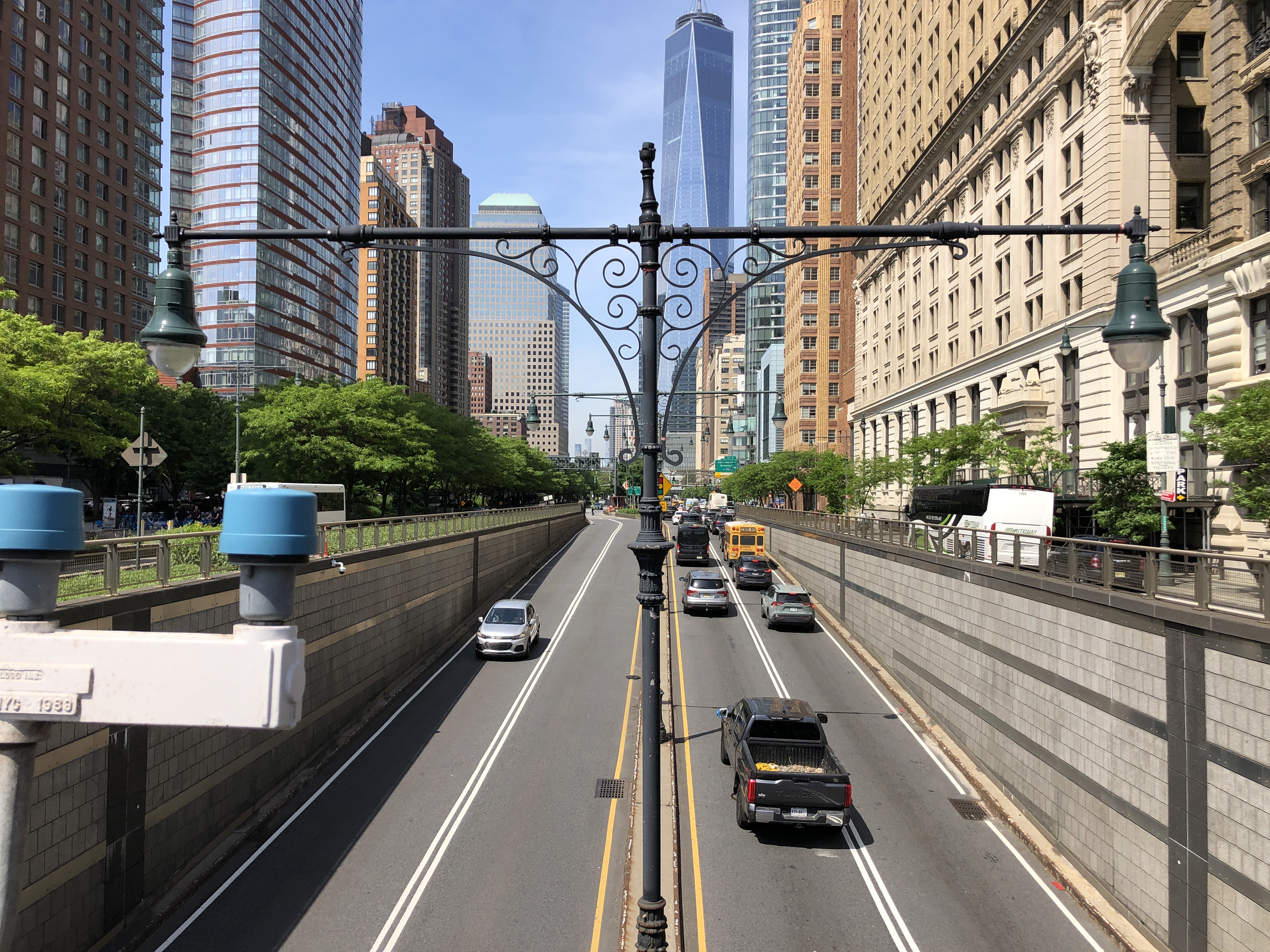
Beginning of West Street and the West Side Highway starting from the Battery Park Underpass

=== West Street ===
The highway begins from Battery Park close to the mouth of the Brooklyn-Battery Tunnel where it also accepts traffic from the southern terminus of FDR Drive. From there, the route passes close to the site of the World Trade Center at Vesey Street. The route continues with this name passing by numerous piers along the Hudson River until Gansevoort Street in the Meatpacking District where it becomes Eleventh Avenue.

=== Eleventh Avenue ===
Eleventh Avenue begins just north of the intersection with Tenth Avenue. The highway is concurrent with Eleventh Avenue north of this point, passing by the 14th Street Park at 14th Street. The highway continues with this name alongside the Chelsea Piers until it reaches 22nd Street where the highway branches off from Eleventh Avenue onto Twelfth Avenue.

=== Twelfth Avenue ===
At 22nd Street, the highway continues as Twelfth Avenue passing by the Chelsea Waterside Park. It passes just west of the Javits Center from 34th Street to 38th Street and over the Lincoln Tunnel at 39th Street. The road continues past the Intrepid Sea, Air & Space Museum and Piers 84 to 92, a major cruise ship terminal building. At 59th Street, the highway becomes an elevated freeway and at 72nd Street, the highway becomes the Henry Hudson Parkway.

Another section of 12th Avenue exists in Manhattanville, Manhattan, between 125th and 138th streets. The Manhattan Valley Viaduct, between Tiemann Place and 135th Street, carries Riverside Drive above 12th Avenue.

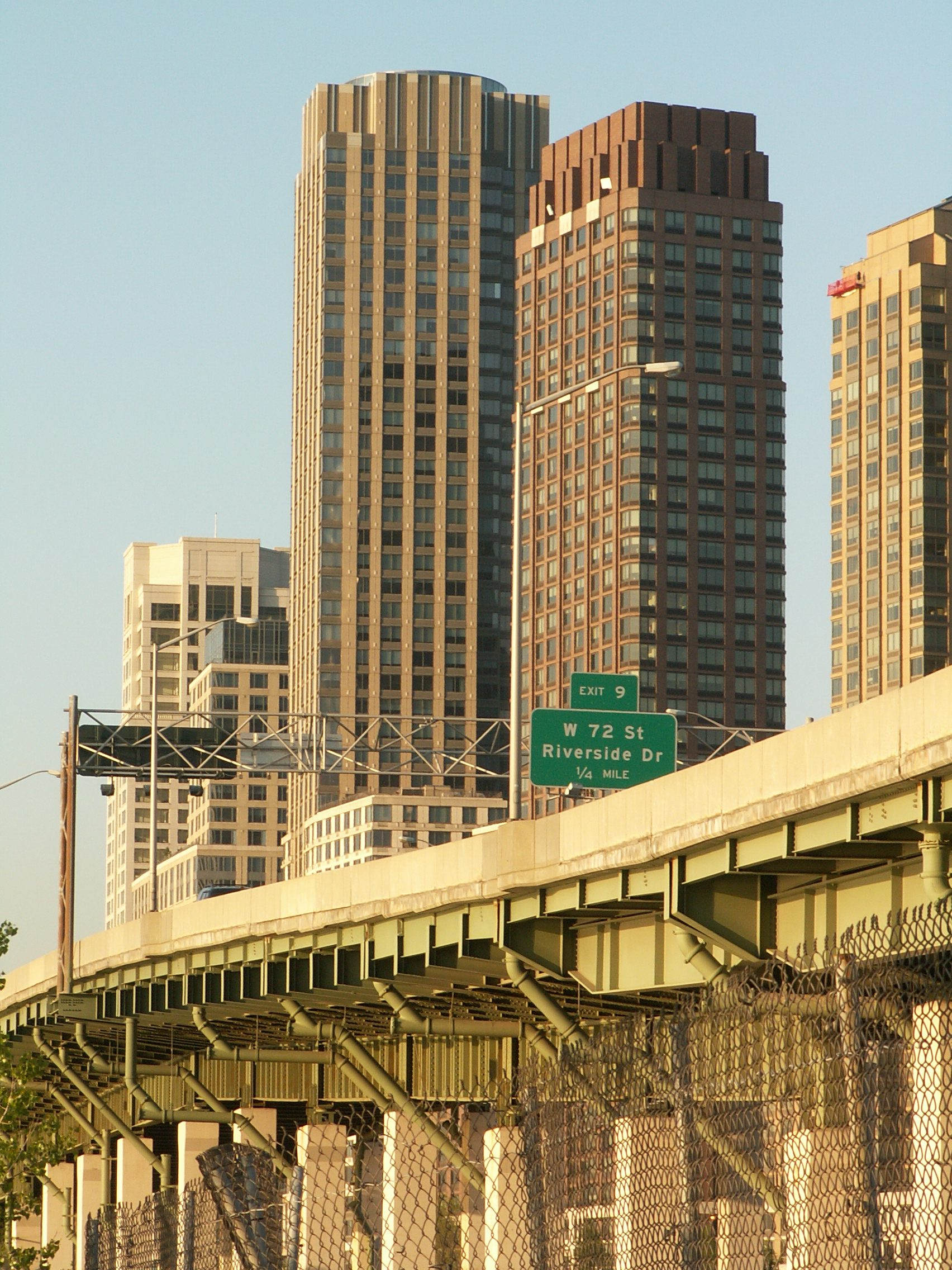
The last elevated portion of the West Side Highway by the Riverside South apartment complex

== West Side Elevated Highway ==
Various proposals circulated in the 1920s to build an expressway on the west side. Among the proposals:

- Rail/Highway Double Decker – The New York Central Railroad proposed building a highway/rail double decked highway from 72nd Street to Canal Street, which would be constructed privately at no cost to the city. It would eliminate 106 grade crossings over 84 blocks. It ran into opposition because of fears that it would create a rail monopoly.
- Hencken's Ten-story Train/Car/Office/People Mover – Engineer John Hencken proposed an exotic ten-story complex with a rail line underground, a road at street level, and a people mover built above that, topped by ten stories of apartments and offices. The highway would run on top of the ten-story buildings.

Manhattan borough president Julius Miller said that something had to be done right away and ultimately pushed through the plan for the West Side Elevated Highway, which was to eventually bear his name. The proposal immediately ran into stiff opposition. The City Club and New York City Mayor James J. Walker objected to the highway on the grounds that it would block waterfront-bound freight traffic. At the time, West Street exhibited a "daily avalanche of freight and passengers in traffic", and was "walled by an unbroken line of bulkhead sheds and dock structures" blocking the view not only of the river, but even of the ships being serviced, and the commerce carried out on those piers and slips was vital to the economic health of the city. They believed that the plans should wait until the surface railroad tracks were removed in the area, at which point the elevated highway might not be necessary. Many objected that it would be ugly. Finally, in 1929, construction started, and the section between Canal Street and West 72nd Street was completed in 1937, with a "Southern Extension" to the Brooklyn–Battery Tunnel completed in 1951.

=== Death Avenue ===
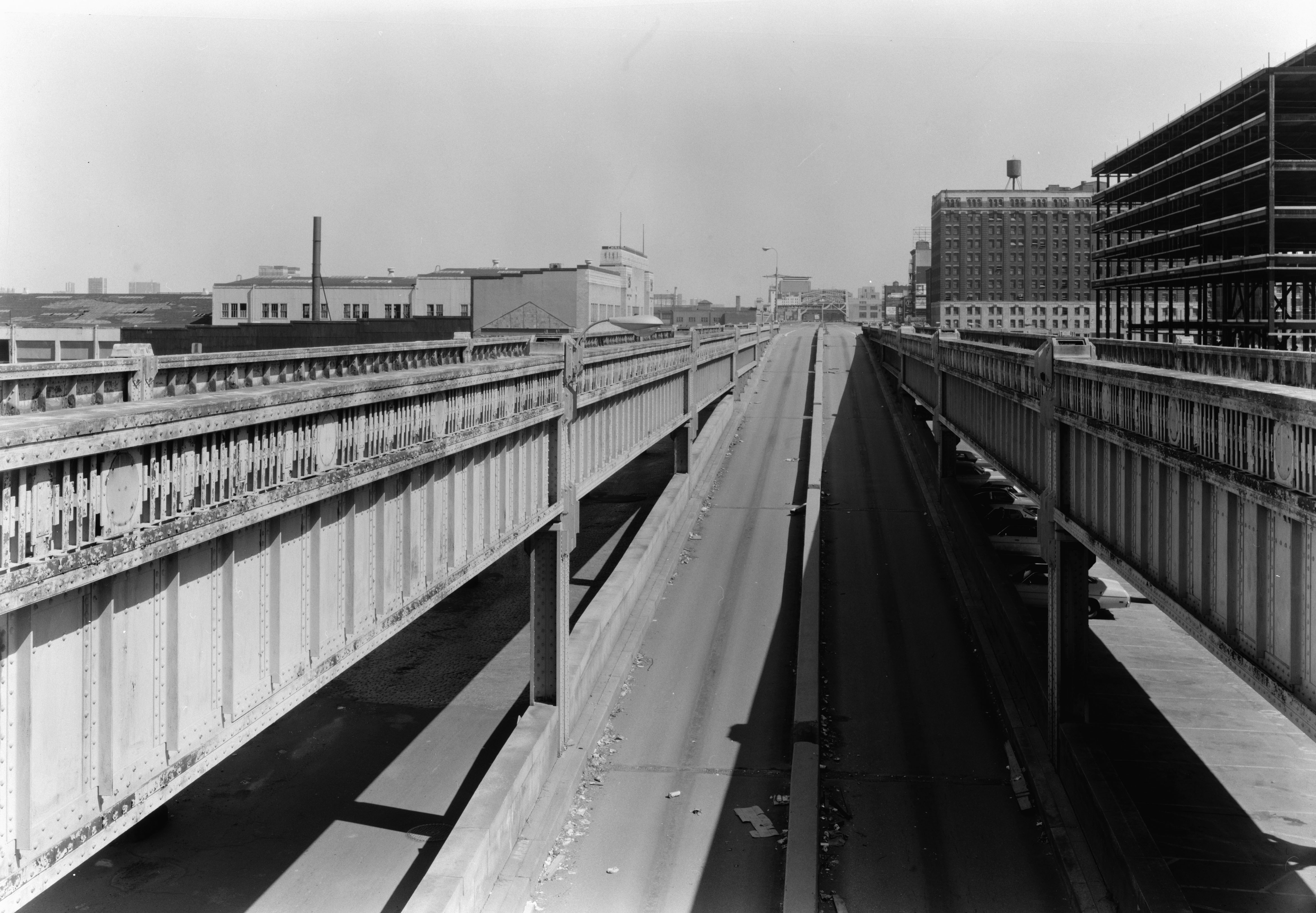
Former elevated highway, looking north at the Chambers Street ramps

Before the West Side Highway was built, the road along the Hudson River was busy, with significant cross traffic going to docks and ferries. At 22nd Street, most traffic continued north along Eleventh Avenue, along which the New York Central Railroad (NYCRR)'s West Side Line ran; it was known by many as "Death Avenue" for the many crashes caused by trains and automobiles colliding.

The first official proposal for an elevated highway along Manhattan's west side was made by Police Commissioner Richard Edward Enright on January 12, 1924, in a letter to the New York City Board of Estimate. The highway was to be 100 feet (30 m) wide, running north from the Battery to 72nd Street at Riverside Drive, West End Avenue, or Amsterdam Avenue. According to Enright, "During business hours West Street [was] the most congested thoroughfare in the city. Vast quantities of the city's foodstuffs [were] handled in the territory adjacent to West Street." He cited traffic congestion as an extra cost of doing business and a blockage for fire engines.

=== Plans for the new highway ===
==== Double-decker railroad/highway proposal ====
On February 2, 1925, it was announced that the railroad would build a combined double-decker elevated highway and freight railroad (with the highway above the railroad) for $24 million at no cost to the city. At the time, Eleventh Avenue was popularly known as "Death Avenue" owing to the dangers of the surface line. The elevated structure would eliminate 106 grade crossings over 84 blocks. The proposal came about after six months of negotiations between Manhattan Borough President Julius Miller and the NYCRR. The planned highway would no longer go to the Battery, instead ending at Canal Street, meeting the Holland Tunnel (which would open to traffic on November 13, 1927). The northern terminus was set at 72nd Street and Riverside Drive. Ramps were planned at Canal Street, 23rd Street, Riverside Drive, and at least two other locations.

The Port of New York Authority opposed the plan, preferring a more forward-looking comprehensive freight distribution plan. They attacked Miller as trying to push the plan through without input from the Port Authority. The Port Authority wanted a system of inland terminals and belt-line railroads. According to Port Authority Chairman Julian Gregory, it was almost certain that NYCRR would not go along with the Port Authority plan. It was also believed that giving NYCRR elevated tracks on the west side would allow the railroad to monopolize freight and raise prices. The Port Authority believed it was primarily a freight problem, but NYCRR and New York City considered it to be a grade-crossing elimination project.

Miller responded by arguing that something had to be done right away. He said that if the Port Authority could put forward a comprehensive plan within five years, he would put his full support behind it. He also pointed out that his plan was only one part of his "comprehensive plan for the relief of traffic congestion"; he had already widened many avenues and removed several Midtown elevated railroad spurs. He said the plan would not give the NYCRR any rights they did not already have; it was merely a relocation of existing tracks. The tracks had been on the surface for 55 years despite legal action taken against them, and Miller claimed they would be there for another 50 if nothing were done. Miller also received a letter from NYCRR Vice President Ira Place, stating that the railroad would reduce freight rates if the new elevated structure were built.

==== Miller's elevated single-deck highway ====
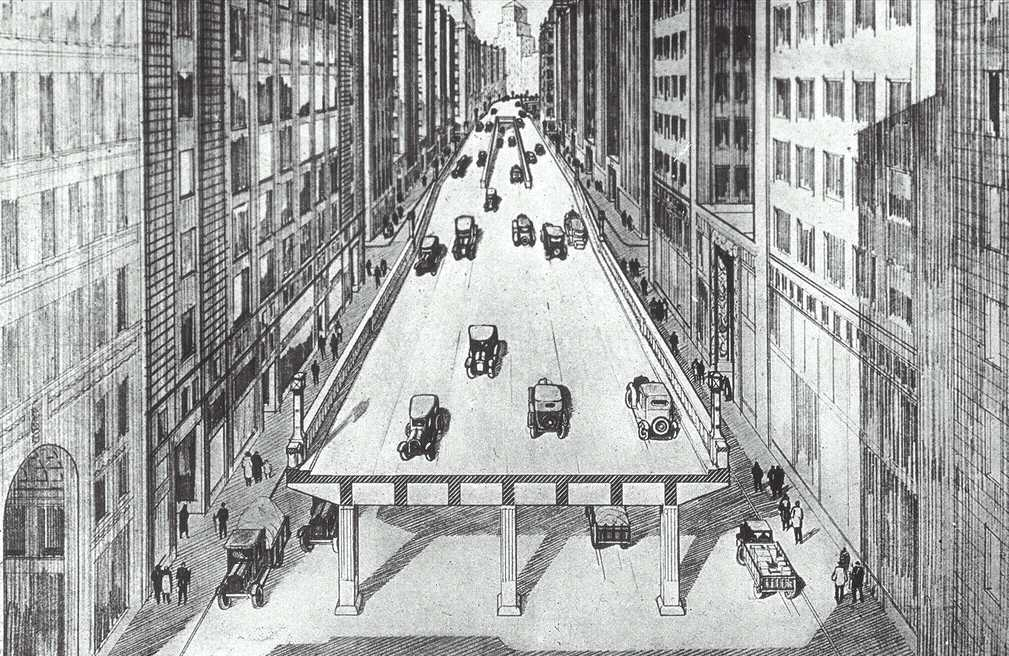
A plan for Boston's Central Artery, based on the West Side Highway

On January 20, 1926, borough president Miller sent a plan for an $11 million elevated highway to be built completely on city property to the Board of Estimate. The elevated railroad was removed from the plan, since NYCRR had come up with a separate project for partially elevating and depressing their railroad (now known as the High Line). According to Miller, there were questions over who would own and maintain the dual structure. There were also objections to its height of 40 feet (12 m) and its placement at the east building line of the existing surface roads. The elevated highway was to connect to a planned parkway (now the Henry Hudson Parkway) at 72nd Street, forming a highway free from cross traffic stretching from Canal Street to 129th Street. The elevated road was to be 60 feet (18 m) wide, wide enough for six lanes of traffic; the existing surface road would carry local traffic beneath the highway. Ramps would be provided at Canal Street, Christopher Street, 14th Street, 23rd Street, 34th Street, 42nd Street, and 57th Street. Slow-moving traffic would use the left lanes, due to the left-hand ramps. This contrasts with the current method of using the left lane for passing and putting ramps on the right side, and to the method popular around the 1950s of putting ramps on whichever side was easier. The highway would "carry buses that will make both its conveniences and its beauties available to the general public", according to Miller. He suggested Hudson River Boulevard for the name of the highway.

On April 24, 1925, Governor Al Smith signed a bill authorizing the construction of the highway. Funds for the $11 million highway were to be procured by property assessments along the route; this was considered reasonable due to advantages gained from the highway by those living along the route. The road was to be 65 feet (20 m), five feet wider than Fifth Avenue, with a speed limit of at least 30 miles per hour (48 km/h), and would be 20 feet (6.1 m) off the ground. It would be built of steel, with a cement face. A three-foot (1 m) sidewalk would be built for pedestrians, although the highway was intended mainly for motor vehicles. Two-block-long ramps would be provided with easy grades for entering and exiting the highway. Trucks would be allowed on the highway.

The Board of Estimate approved the highway, now costing $13.5 million on June 14, 1926. It was to be built so a second deck could be added at a later time for about $9 million if traffic warranted. Controller Charles W. Berry questioned the proposal until he realized the money would come from tax assessments, at which time he agreed with the project.

On November 10, 1926, the Sinking Fund Commission voted to give the city title to the waterfront property along the proposed highway. The highway plan was linked to a plan by the city for more piers for ocean steamships; since the highway required land takings between 47th Street and 51st Street, it was easier to combine the projects and prevent additional expense.

On February 17, 1927, the Board of Estimate adopted the final plans for the highway, setting a hearing date of March 24. It was split into two sections, Section one went from Canal Street to 59th Street. Section two was to carry the road over the NYCRR's 60th Street Yard from 59th Street to 72nd Street. Section two was approved by the Board of Estimate on August 16, 1928; section one was postponed until September 27 due to objections. On October 18, the Board of Estimate approved section one. The highway was advocated by most business interests, including the Downtown League, the Fifth Avenue Association, the West End Association, and eleven other organizations. They cited increasing traffic and the need of a bypass route to support the highway, which would cost little in comparison to its benefits. Miller spoke at a meeting of the Market and Business Men's Association of the Greenwich and Chelsea Districts on October 30, 1928, detailing plans for the highway. It was announced that between 90 and 100 meat and poultry dealers in the West Washington Market and the Gansevoort Market would be evicted to make way for the highway.

Minor changes to the highway were approved on January 10, 1929, in response to several objections. The alignment in the Chelsea district was slightly modified to avoid proposed piers, and the path through the markets was realigned to pass over a corner of the property. In addition, the 14th Street ramps were moved to the area between 19th Street and 23rd Street, where they would spare many markets at 14th Street. In addition, the West Washington Market would no longer be demolished, and instead the highway would graze the roofs of some of the stores.

==== Exotic alternatives ====
An alternate plan was put forth by John Hencken, an engineer, and approved by Ernest P. Goodrich, consulting engineer to the Regional Plan of New York and its Environs. A linear corridor would be built from the Battery to Yonkers. A freight railroad would lie underground. On ground level would be roads alongside the corridor and an indoor enclosed sidewalk. The mezzanine, between the first and second floors, would be occupied by office space. The second floor would carry a "continuous noiseless moving platform system for passenger service", with adjacent belts moving at various speeds, for a maximum of 21 miles per hour (34 km/h) in the middle. This service would be free, and would be a substitute for new subways in the corridor. Above the second floor would be about ten stories of apartments, offices, businesses, and other uses appropriate for the neighborhoods; these would be the main source of revenue to pay for the project. A high-speed motor parkway, open to passenger cars only, would lie on top. Cars would reach the upper level via ramps at both ends and elevators at convenient intervals.

Dr. Benjamin Battin, a professor at Swarthmore College, Pennsylvania, had a similar plan for an eight-story high boulevard. The street level and first floor would be connected to the Hudson River piers. The second and third stories would carry electric passenger trains, with the second floor carrying northbound traffic and southbound traffic using the third floor. A public garage would occupy the fourth and fifth floors, helping to pay off the bonds for the project. The sixth and seventh floors would carry one-way passenger car traffic, permitting speeds of up to 50 miles per hour (80 km/h). A reversible roadway, carrying cars in the direction of rush hour traffic, would occupy the eighth and ninth (top) levels. Ramps to the upper car levels would be provided every 15 to 20 blocks.

=== Art Society objections ===
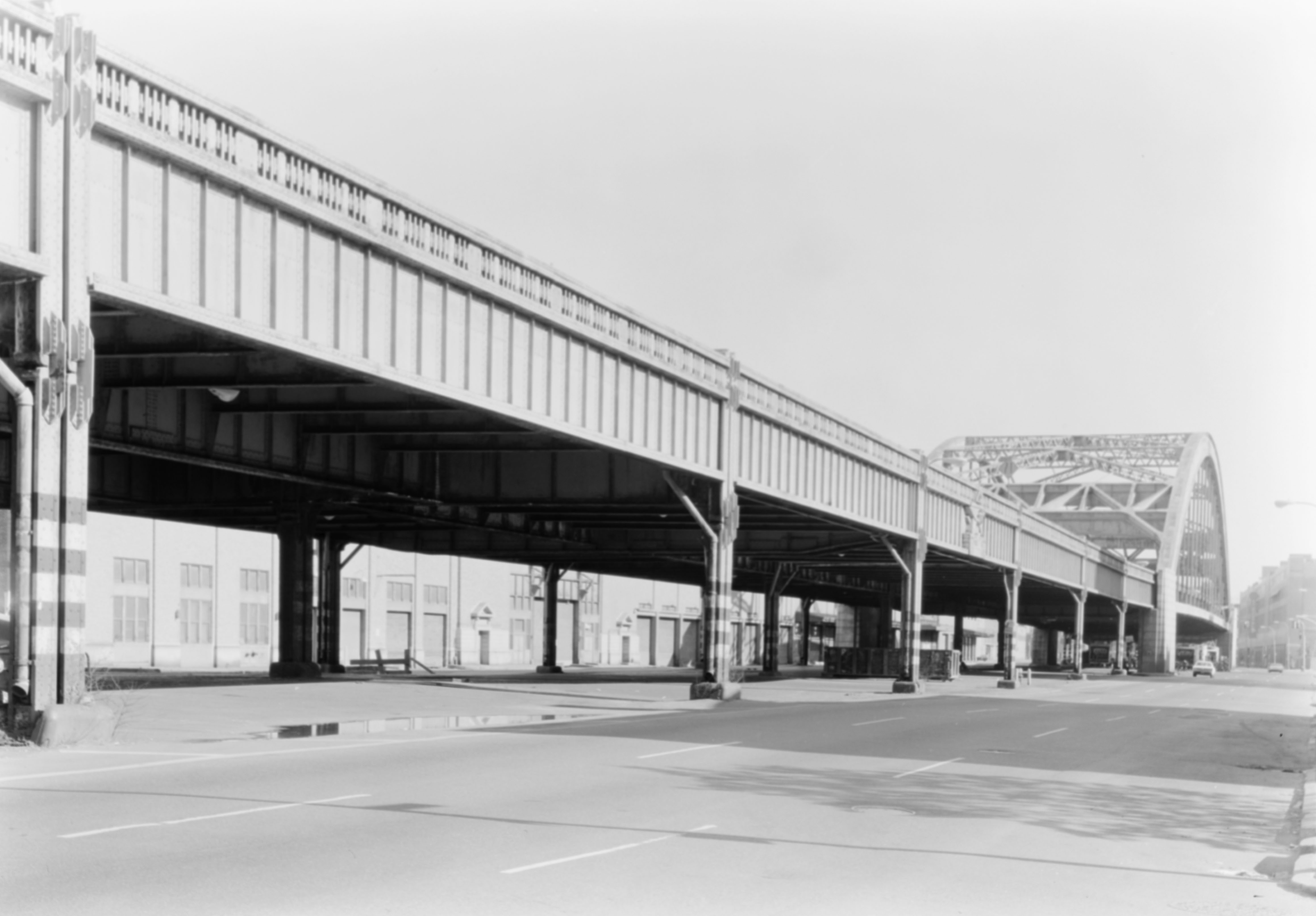
The old elevated highway, looking north towards the bridge over Canal Street

The plan was criticized by Thomas Adams, Regional Plan Association director, at the 1927 meeting of the Municipal Art Society. He disapproved of its ugliness and noise, and suggested simply clearing obstructions to the existing surface road to speed traffic. Adams instead supported a comprehensive regional plan for development in the Hudson Valley. The Fine Arts Federation also opposed the highway, saying that elevated structures were unsightly, and that if the existing street were cleared a new highway might not be required.

The City Club and New York City Mayor Jimmy Walker objected to the highway on the grounds that it would block waterfront-bound freight traffic. They believed that the plans should wait until the surface railroad tracks were removed in the area, at which point the elevated highway might not be necessary. Parallels were drawn with elevated passenger railroads, which were being torn down at the time; Henry Curran of the City Club called elevated structures "a misfit in New York". The City Club also objected to more passenger cars in downtown Manhattan.

Concerns were raised by the Women's League for the Protection of Riverside Park, which opposed routing trucks through Riverside Park, which would contain a parkway extending from the north end of the planned elevated highway. The League emphasized that commercial traffic should be banned north of 72nd Street (as it currently is on the Henry Hudson Parkway).

=== Robert Moses proposals ===
Having begun at Canal Street in 1929, implementation of the elevated roadway had progressed as far as Midtown by the time that Robert Moses became NYC Parks Commissioner and took a direct interest in local projects by 1934. However, Moses created significant works extending from the north and south ends of the West Side Highway, including:

- Henry Hudson Parkway – The West Side Highway becomes the Henry Hudson Parkway just north of 72nd Street thanks to efforts by Moses called the "West Side Improvement." The parkway does not permit trucks. The parkway is partially an elevated highway over the rail tracks (now used by Amtrak).
- Brooklyn–Battery Tunnel – The highway hooks into the Brooklyn–Battery Tunnel at its southern end. Moses had proposed to create the "Brooklyn–Battery Crossing Bridge" but federal intervention obliged Moses to use a tunnel instead.
- Battery Park Underpass connects to FDR Drive.

In the 1960s, Moses proposed straightening the West Side Highway, widening both the highway and the Henry Hudson Parkway, and constructing both the Lower Manhattan Expressway and the Mid-Manhattan Expressways, connecting routes that would have stretched across Manhattan. None of these projects were ever built. Later, in his 80s, he opposed the Westway project, but by that time his power was gone and his ideas generally weren't taken seriously. Rather than constructing a below-grade interstate highway, Moses proposed merely straightening and rebuilding the West Side Highway south of 59th Street. Between 59th and 72nd Streets, the site of the former Penn Central 60th Street rail yard, he proposed bringing the highway to grade and moving it eastward to allow for a waterfront park and some housing at the southeast corner of the rail yard. This was the nucleus of the idea that led to the plan for Riverside South.

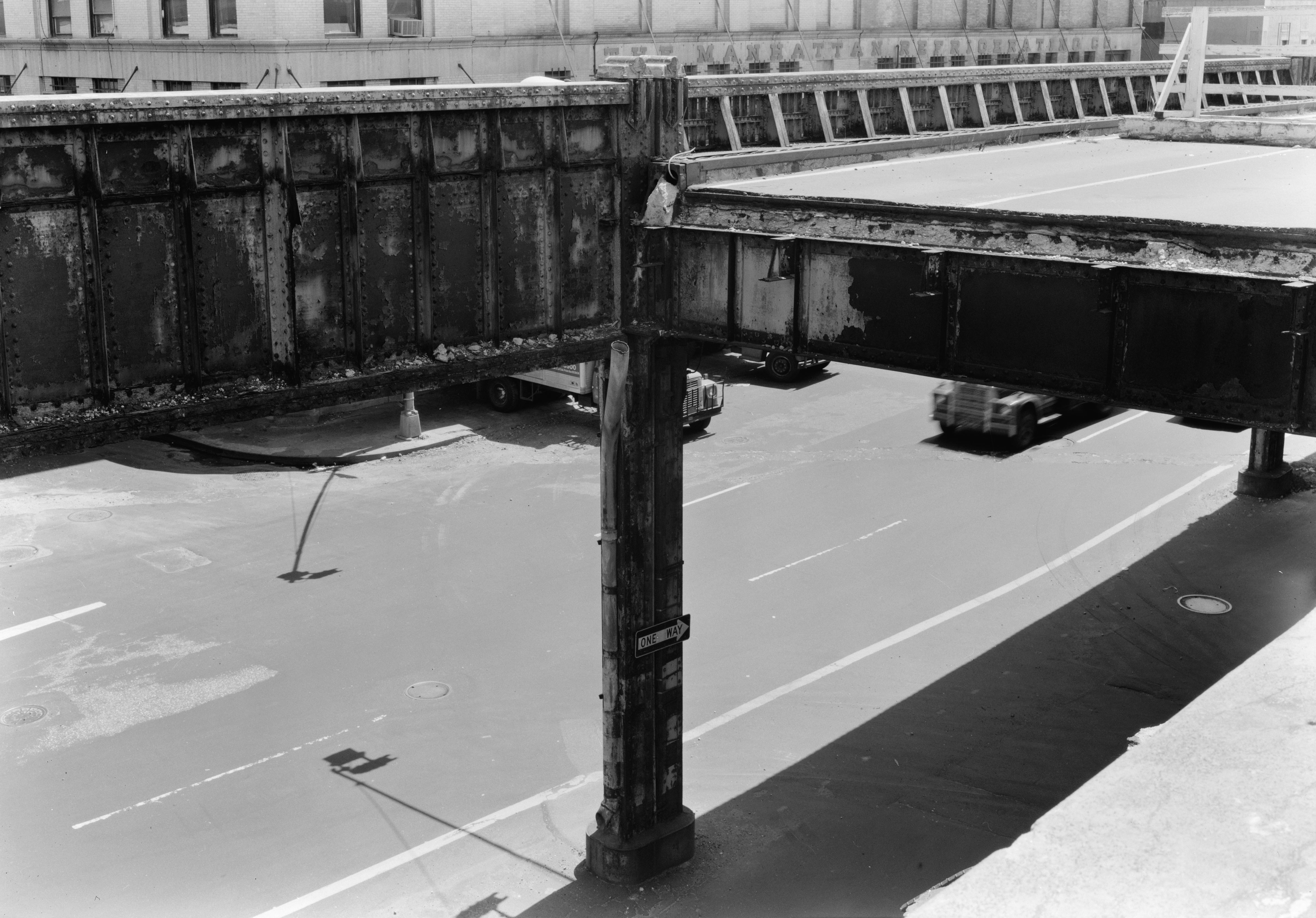
The old elevated highway, collapsed at 14th Street

=== 1973 collapse ===
The highway was not designed well, resulting in many shortcomings. Its lanes were considered too narrow and it could not accommodate trucks. Sharp "S" exit ramps proved hazardous, as did the left-hand exit and entrance lanes that made merging dangerous.

On December 15, 1973, the northbound lanes between Little West 12th Street and Gansevoort Street collapsed under the weight of a dump truck, which was carrying over 60,000 pounds (27,000 kg) of asphalt for ongoing repairs of the highway. A four-door sedan followed the truck through the hole; neither driver was seriously injured. The next day, both directions were 'indefinitely' closed south of 18th Street. This not only closed off the oldest section (between Canal Street and 18th Street), but also the newest sections (south of Canal Street), because ramps south of the collapse only permitted northbound entrances and southbound exits. The southernmost northbound exit was at 23rd Street.

== Westway ==
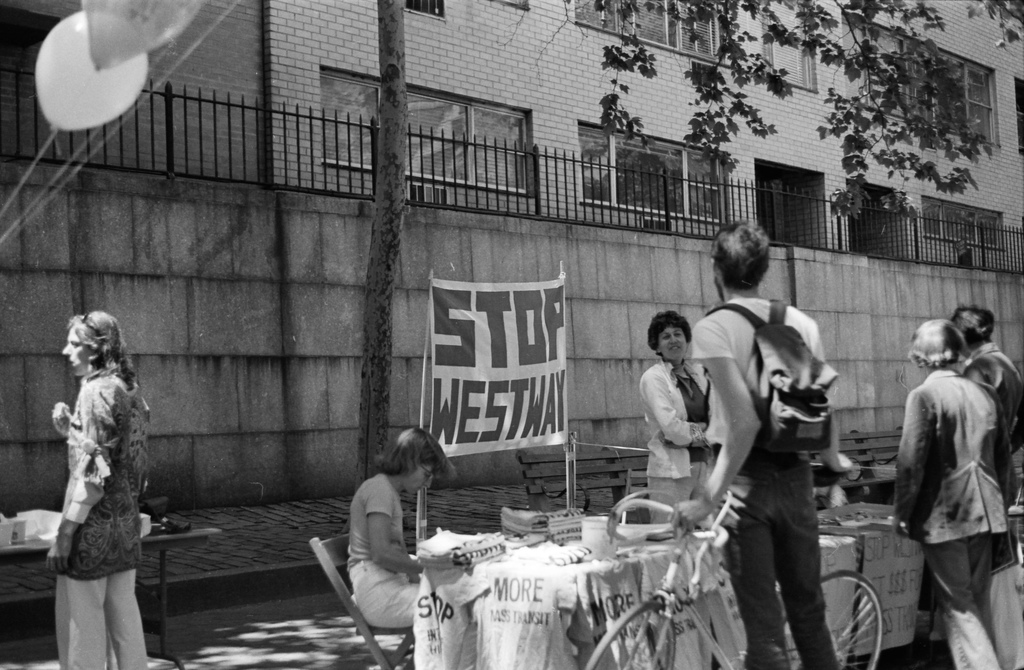
Protesters demonstrating against the Westway project in New York City

In 1971, the Urban Development Corporation (UDC) proposed rebuilding the highway as Interstate 478. UDC's "Water Edge Study" called for the highway to be routed above the water at the ends of the then mostly abandoned piers on the Hudson River and the addition of hundreds of acres of concrete platforms between the bulkhead and the pierhead lines for parks and apartments. The final plan, championed by New York Governor Nelson Rockefeller and Mayor John Lindsay, called for burying the six-lane highway in 220 acres (89 ha) of new landfill south of 40th Street, placing the accompanying development on land instead of on platforms. It was renamed "Westway" in 1974.

Hugh Carey, who was to become governor, and Ed Koch, who was to become mayor, both campaigned against the plan, saying that it would be a waste of government funds and would be a windfall for private developers. After the two were elected, they both reversed their position and supported the plan.

In 1981, President Ronald Reagan's Department of Transportation and the United States Army Corps of Engineers were on board for the construction with a 1981 price tag of $2.1 billion.

But in 1982, Judge Thomas Griesa of the U.S. District Court blocked the Corps permit, saying the road would harm striped bass. His order was affirmed by the U.S. Court of Appeals for the Second Circuit. In August 1985, Judge Griesa ruled that state and federal agencies had provided tainted testimony regarding the striped bass. At the same time, Congress moved to deny necessary funding for the landfill.

On September 30, 1985, New York City officially gave up on the project, allocating 60 percent of its interstate highway funds to mass transit and setting aside $811 million for the "West Side Highway Replacement Project".

== Riverside South ==
In the 1970s, debates raged about what to do with the elevated section from West 72nd Street to 59th Street. One version of Westway would have continued the buried highway up to the George Washington Bridge, eliminating the elevated section between 59th and 72nd streets as well as the Henry Hudson Parkway. That option was rejected because of the cost and because it would violate the Blumenthal Amendment, which prohibited any highway construction that would alter Riverside Park. The New York State Department of Transportation (NYSDOT) rejected former parks commissioner Robert Moses's proposal to relocate the elevated section to grade also because of the Blumenthal Amendment as well as the presumed negative effect on development opportunities. Donald Trump, who had an option on the property, seized on Moses's proposal as a way to enhance his development plans, thus negating one of NYSDOT's objections, but his proposed 12,000-unit residential development went nowhere. So NYSDOT planned for a renovation of the viaduct.

External image
- Google Maps Street View of highway and northbound tunnel entrance

A subsequent development project, Lincoln West, accepted the elevated highway, but, although Lincoln West won approval from the City, it failed to obtain financing. Later, Trump acquired the property and proposed Television City, a design based on a massive 13-block-long podium to hide the elevated highway. Responding to criticism, Trump switched architects, reduced the podium to eight blocks in length, and changed the name to Trump City.

Six civic organizations opposed to Trump City proposed a plan that would relocate and bury the highway in conjunction with a much smaller development and a southward extension of Riverside Park. Trump eventually agreed to this plan, known as Riverside South. After city approval in 1992, work began on the new apartment complex.

As part of the Riverside South agreement, the Urban Development Corporation proceeded with planning and environmental studies for a relocated highway. But relocating and burying the elevated highway section became politically complicated when, at the same time, NYSDOT went ahead with its $70 million project to straighten, widen, and reinforce the viaduct. In 2005 Trump's majority partners sold the project to the Carlyle Group and Extell Development Company. In June 2006, the new developer began construction of a tunnel between 61st and 65th streets for the relocated highway.

== West Side Highway Replacement Project ==
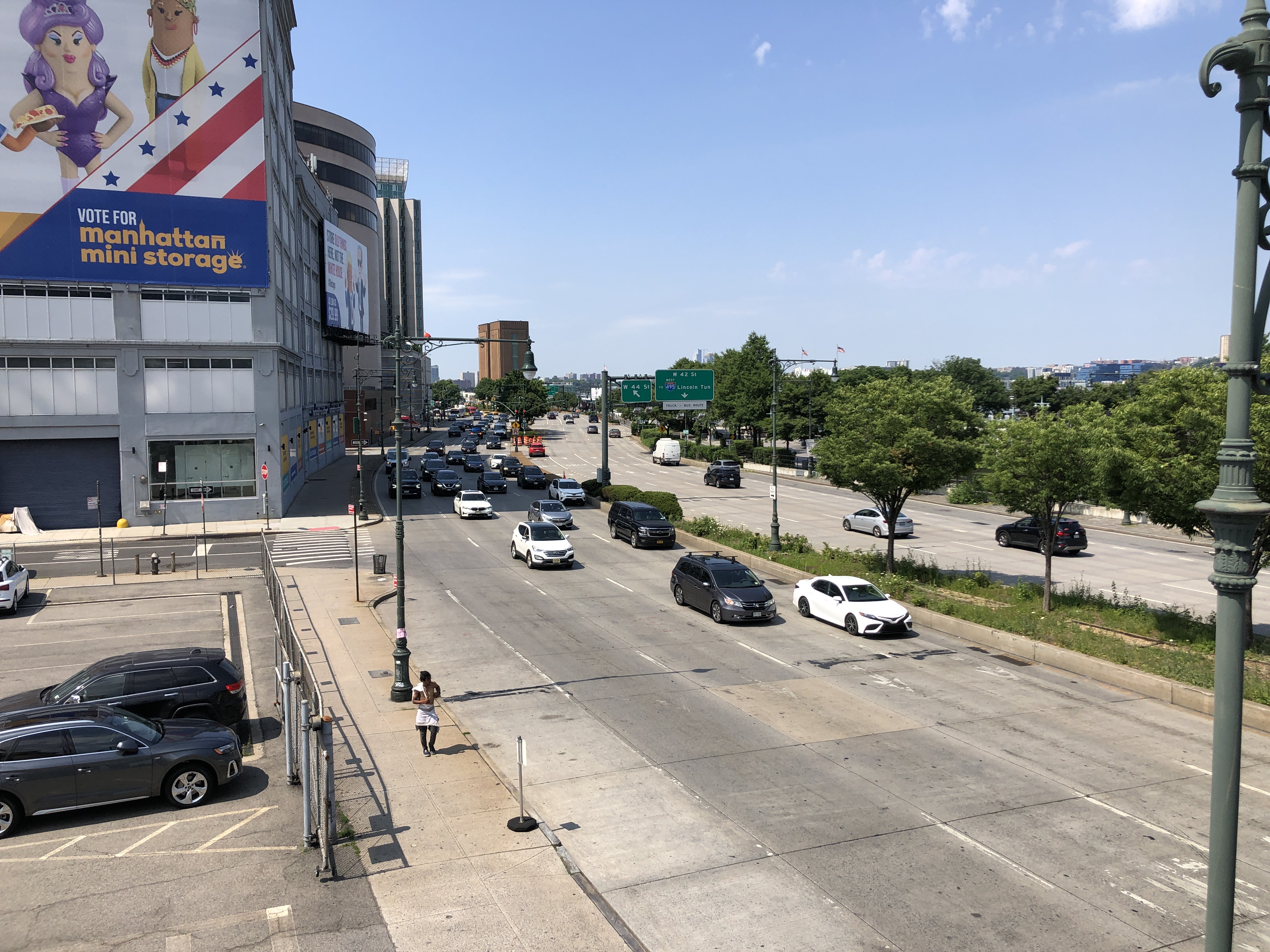
The least leafy portion of the new boulevard is the part by the midtown piers between 34th and 59th Street. This shows the West Side Highway heading south from the Intrepid Sea, Air & Space Museum.

Following the end of the Westway project, there were debates on what to do about the rest of the highway. Vollmer Associates was contracted for the highway replacement project in September 1986. There were four alternatives: three at-grade options with a varying number of lanes and quality of roadway, and one option with grade-separated ramps over busy intersections. By November, a commission was set up to discuss the alternatives. Four days later, several sections of the highway were agreed on. It would be an elevated highway north of 49th Street; an at-grade roadway between 44th and 25th Streets, including a depressed northbound roadway from 32nd to 42nd Streets; a tunnel under a park between 20th and 25th Streets; an at-grade boulevard between 20th and Houston Streets; an at-grade road with a 3-lane elevated ramp between Houston and Harrison Streets; and a 9-lane boulevard with depressed ramps through Battery Park City. There would be 26 traffic lights. This proposal was assailed by mass-transit associations, environmental groups, and elected officials.

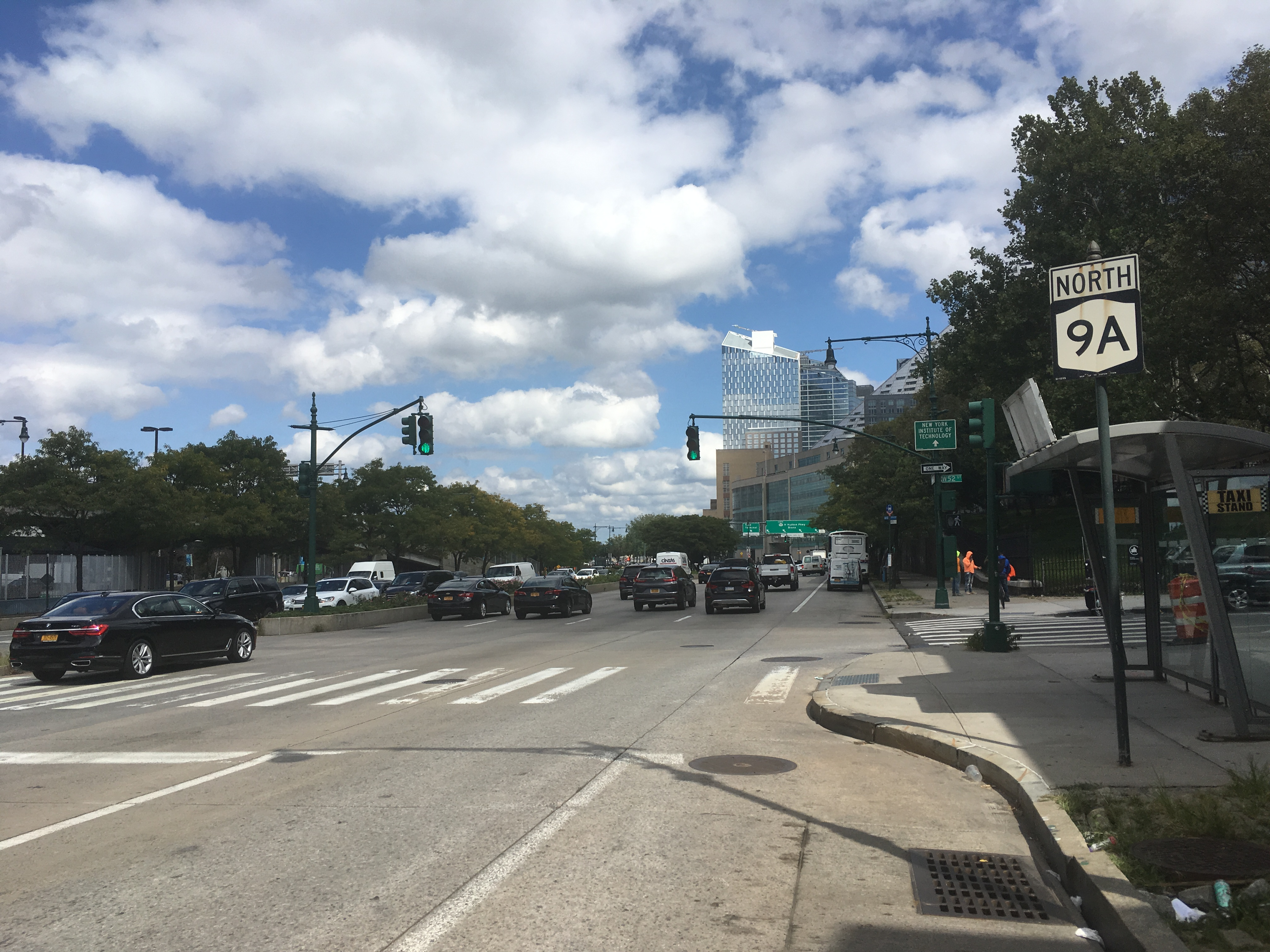
NY 9A (West Side Highway) northbound at 52nd Street in Manhattan

In January 1987, the commission unanimously agreed to build the highway as a six-lane urban boulevard with a parkway-style median and decorative lightposts. There would be a 60 acres (24 ha) $100 million park on the highway's western periphery, the latter of which was criticized by Governor Mario Cuomo as being too expensive. Afterward, there were some delays caused by Cuomo's reluctance to prioritize the project. In the meantime, the old, abandoned highway was being used by squatters. One of the first options to be rejected in 1989 was the construction of a boulevard on landfill, which was the reason for Westway's cancellation. There were also proposals for "cove" developments alongside the future boulevard.

Construction began in early 1996 on the West Side Highway project. The first of the project's seven segments—between Clarkson and Horatio streets in the Greenwich Village neighborhood—was completed in 1998.

Construction of the West Side Highway Replacement Project was completed between the Battery and 59th Street in August 2001. The period between the 1973 collapse and the 1985 demise of Westway was a chaotic time for drivers as the original elevated highway was dismantled (finally in 1989) and traffic was rerouted to temporary highways. The new highway permits trucks, which the old elevated did not. Together with the northern Henry Hudson Parkway, it creates a leafy boulevard along the Hudson River from the northern tip to the southern tip of Manhattan.

=== Hudson River Park ===
Legislation in June 1998 followed an agreement by Mayor Rudolph Giuliani and Governor George Pataki to create the Hudson River Park on the west side of the highway from West 59th to the Battery. The park consists of 550 acres (2.2 km^{2}) and is the biggest park construction in the city since Central Park. A bicycle path running the length of the highway to Battery Park City was one of the first additions. Piers are currently being refurbished and other work continues, with Pier 84 as the largest.

=== Joe DiMaggio Highway ===
Even though the highway has had two other official names, the official names have never stuck. The first official name was the Miller Highway, in honor of the city council president who pushed for the highway. On March 30, 1999, at the urging of Mayor Giuliani, the highway was renamed for legendary New York Yankees player Joe DiMaggio, who had died three weeks earlier. Legislation to rename the highway had been introduced before DiMaggio died. Giuliani championed the name change because the highway would have been the approach to the proposed West Side Stadium at the highway and 32nd Street. DiMaggio lived on Manhattan's east side.

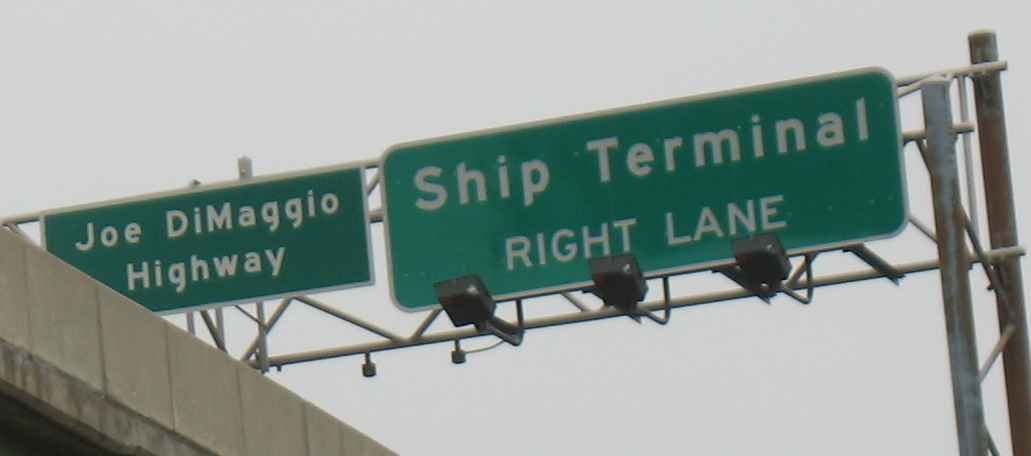
Joe DiMaggio Highway sign on the elevated portion of the highway

Signs bearing the new, ceremonial name of the highway were erected on April 25, 1999. This was in the midst of a reconstruction, finished on March 29, 2002, after the September 11 attacks in 2001 destroyed part of the road, which was still being rebuilt. Only minimal signage for the new name was erected as a result, while "West Side Highway" signs abound.

=== September 11, 2001, and aftermath ===
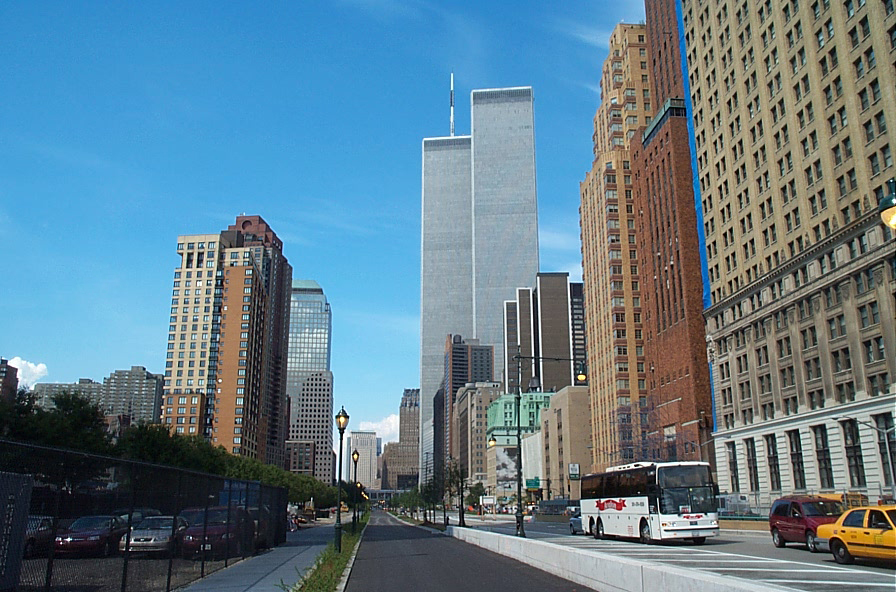
The World Trade Center towers as viewed from the highway in mid-2001

Completion of the project was originally set for October 2001, but it was delayed for years due to damage caused by the September 11 attacks. The highway, which runs just west of the World Trade Center, played a major role in the September 11, 2001 attacks and its aftermath. The famous flag raising photograph by Thomas E. Franklin of The Record took place by the highway on the northwest corner of the site. In addition, three chunks of the tower that crashed into the highway were used in iconic pictures of the day. Emergency personnel went down the West Side Highway and were greeted by cheering crowds at Christopher Street on their return. Virtually all the debris from the Center traveled up the West Side Highway to be shipped off by barge. For the last half of the month, out-of-town ambulances waited on the highway for a chance to help injured patients.

There was debate over whether to rebuild the damaged section of the road as a surface street or a tunnel. As a master plan was developed for Ground Zero, plans initially called for the West Side Highway to be buried in a tunnel between the site and Battery Park City that was expected to cost $1 billion. Goldman Sachs, which had planned to build its headquarters in Battery Park City, announced its intention to cancel those plans because of concerns about the traffic pattern and long-term construction disruptions. This prompted New York Governor George Pataki to cancel the tunnel project in favor of a boulevard. The boulevard was finished by 2014.

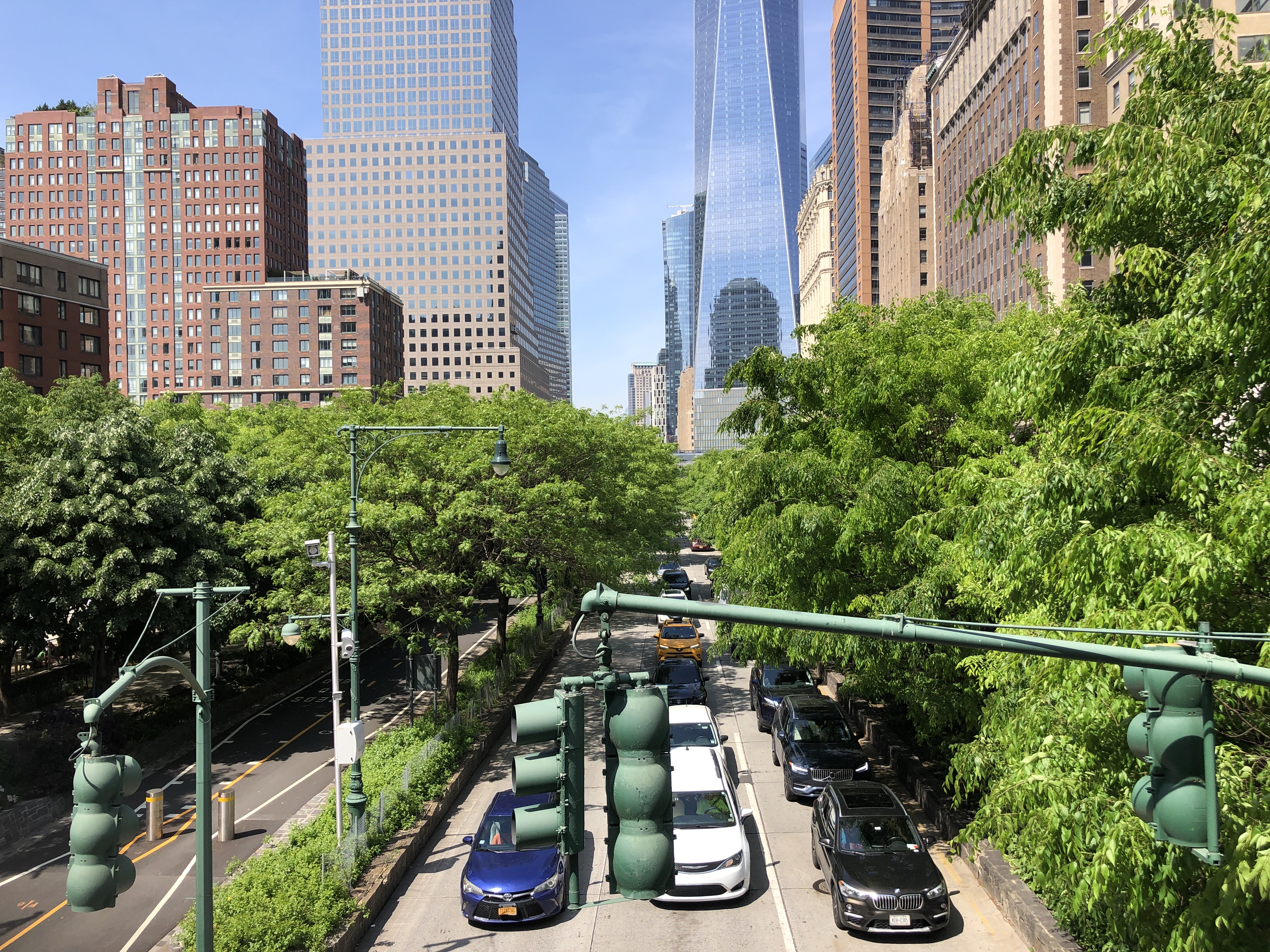
West Side Highway, facing north from West Thames Street pedestrian bridge, 2024

In 2004, the police forces of both the PANYNJ and the NYPD announced concerns that the proposed One World Trade Center would be too close to the West Side Highway and thus vulnerable to car bombs. This prompted a total redesign of the tower and the relocation of its site away from the highway.

There used to be four West Street pedestrian bridges, two of them erected after the September 11 attacks. A below-grade crossing of the West Side Highway connecting Brookfield Place (formerly the World Financial Center) complex and the Concourse level of the World Trade Center opened in October 2013, allowing the pedestrian bridge adjacent to Vesey Street to be removed.

On October 31, 2017, a man intentionally drove a pickup truck for a mile through the Hudson River Park's bike path, parallel to the West Side Highway, between Houston Street and Chambers Street, killing eight people and injuring at least 11. In 2022, Manhattan borough president Mark Levine proposed converting one lane of the West Side Highway into a bike path due to heavy traffic on Hudson River Park's bike lane.

== Major intersections ==
Despite mostly being a boulevard, with many at-grade intersections and traffic lights, some of the intersections are given exit numbers.

Location	mi	km	Exit	Destinations	Notes
Battery Park	0.00	0.00		Battery Place NY 9A begins	Southern terminus; southern terminus of NY 9A
Battery Park City	0.10	0.16	1	FDR Drive north	Interchange; southbound exit and northbound entrance; southern terminus of FDR Drive
Battery Park City	0.20– 0.40	0.32– 0.64	2	Hugh L. Carey Tunnel (I-478 Toll south) to I-278 – Brooklyn	Former NY 27A
Tribeca	1.45	2.33	3	Canal Street to I-78 west (Holland Tunnel) – Chinatown, Little Italy, New Jersey	
Greenwich Village	2.43	3.91	4	10th Avenue – Meat Market	
Chelsea	3.32	5.34	5	West 30th Street to NY 495 west (Lincoln Tunnel) – New Jersey	Lincoln Tunnel exit for cars
Hell's Kitchen	4.00	6.44	6	West 40th Street / West 42nd Street to NY 495 west (Lincoln Tunnel) – New Jersey	Lincoln Tunnel exit for all vehicles
Hell's Kitchen	4.66	7.50	7	West 56th Street / West 57th Street	Exit number not signed southbound
Hell's Kitchen	4.90	7.89	Southern end of freeway section		
Hell's Kitchen	4.90	7.89	8	West 59th Street – Ship Terminal	Northbound exit only; all trucks must exit
Riverside South	5.42	8.72	9	West 72nd Street	Northbound entrance only
Riverside South	5.42	8.72	–	NY 9A north / Henry Hudson Parkway north – Bronx	Northern terminus; northern end of NY 9A concurrency
1.000 mi = 1.609 km; 1.000 km = 0.621 mi: Concurrency terminus; Electronic toll collection; Incomplete access

== See also ==
- West Street pedestrian bridges, a group of pedestrian bridges that cross the highway
