= Richard Jacobs (rabbi) =

American rabbi

Richard J. Jacobs
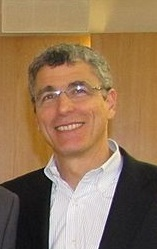
- Born: 1956 (age 69–70); New Rochelle, New York, United States
- Organization: Union for Reform Judaism
- Spouse: Susan K. Freedman

Richard (Reuben Jacob) Jacobs is a Reform rabbi and the president of the Union for Reform Judaism (URJ), the congregational arm of the Reform movement in North America which represents an estimated 1.5 million Reform Jews in nearly 900 synagogues across the United States and Canada. He is the first Union president to have served most of his career as a congregational rabbi. Before being installed as URJ president in June 2012, he served for nine years at Brooklyn Heights Synagogue and then for twenty years at Westchester Reform Temple in Scarsdale, New York.

Jacobs was among a group of American Reform rabbis that called for “urgent change” in the Reform movement. He focuses on environmentalism, social justice and liberal Zionism alongside traditional worship. He has served on the boards of several Jewish organizations, including the World Union for Progressive Judaism, American Jewish World Service and the New Israel Fund.

Rabbi Jacobs was listed as number six in The Daily Beast and Newsweek’s list of “America’s Top 50 Rabbis for 2013” and was 26th on the Jerusalem Post’s 2012 list of “50 most influential Jews in the world.”

== Life and career ==
=== Early life and education ===
A native of New Rochelle, New York, who grew up in Tustin, California where his parents had a retail furniture business, Jacobs was ordained as rabbi in 1982 by Hebrew Union College-Jewish Institute of Religion in New York where he had also earned his M.A. in Hebrew Literature in 1980. In the same year, he joined Avodah Dance Ensemble, a modern dance company which performs services in dance and concerts throughout the United States. He remained with the company until 1986 as dancer and choreographer, working as part-time rabbi in order to continue performing after being ordained.

In Jerusalem, he studied at the Shalom Hartman Institute and at the Rubin Academy of Music and Dance. He considered a career as a dancer, but decided to “dedicate his life to a religious and spiritual mission, and chose the rabbinate”.

=== Career and views ===
Before becoming rabbi at Westchester Reform Temple in 1991, Jacobs served as rabbi at the Brooklyn Heights Synagogue from 1982 until 1991, where he founded and co-directed the first homeless shelter at a synagogue in New York City and led the congregation's work with Brooklyn Ecumenical Cooperatives, an interracial coalition of faith communities that built 1,200 housing units in Brooklyn. Under Jacobs’ leadership, Westchester Reform Temple grew from fewer than 800 member families to more than 1,200. Advocating for the Jewish mission of tikkun olam (repairing the world), the synagogue underwent an eco-friendly renovation and expansion in 2009 and houses a ner tamid (eternal flame) powered by solar energy.

Jacobs was a member of the Union of Reform Judaism′s board of trustees from 1994 through 1998 and served as the Secretary of the Central Conference of American Rabbis (CCAR) and on the board of the World Union for Progressive Judaism (WUPJ), which, in 2000, rewarded him with its “International Humanitarian Award” for his commitment to human rights and social and economic justice. In 2005 he visited the Chad–Darfur border area with an international humanitarian mission, and raised more than $250,000 to aid Darfur refugees. He delivered the opening prayer for the 2006 Darfur rally in Washington, D.C. He was the only rabbi who participated in the 2009 Brookings U.S.-Islamic World Forum in Doha, Qatar, an annual conference designed to bring together key leaders in the worlds of politics, business, media, academia, and civil society from across the Muslim world and the United States. Following the devastating earthquake in Haiti in January 2010, he joined a delegation to assess disaster response. In July 2010 he participated in a protest in Sheikh Jarrah, a Palestinian neighborhood of East Jerusalem, explaining: “I take issue with residents of east Jerusalem being taken out of their homes to make room for Jewish settlers;” in August of the same year he spoke on CNN in support of the proposed Islamic center near ground zero.

Jacobs has published several essays in Reform Judaism magazine and reportedly is pursuing a Ph.D. in ritual dance at New York University. He also is a senior rabbinic fellow at the Shalom Hartman Institute in Jerusalem. In 2007, he received a Doctor of Divinity honoris causa from Hebrew Union College-Jewish Institute of Religion in recognition of his 25 years in the rabbinate.

Immediately after his nomination as URJ president, The Daily Beast and Newsweek placed him at number seven on their 2011 list of “America's 50 Most Influential Rabbis,” describing him as “magnetic” and “known for prioritizing social justice ... and rethinking worship to engage the disaffected.” He held the same position on the 2012 list, where he was described as “a charismatic speaker and...a staunch defender of Israel”, who was, however, also attacked by the Zionist Organization of America for being insufficiently pro-Israel, and moved up to position six in the 2013 list. In 2011, the Jewish Daily Forward listed him as number three on the “Forward 50”, its list of the 50 most significant American Jews, and the Jerusalem Post lists him as number 26 on its 2012 list of “50 most influential Jews in the world.”

Articulating his view of the future of the Reform Movement upon his unanimous election as president in June 2011, Jacobs said:

“Unless we change our approach, there is little chance that Jews in their twenties and thirties will even enter the revolving door of synagogue affiliation. Hoping is not a strategy; the Jewish world needs new approaches for engaging the future. ... Everywhere we look, there are dramatic challenges facing our people; yet each is a phenomenal opportunity to revitalize Jewish life. Only very rarely has Jewish history known an era of so much creativity or innovation; no previous generation has possessed our resources and potential. For two centuries, Reform Judaism has pointed the way forward. For the past forty years, our religious ingenuity has made us the fastest growing theologically liberal denomination in America. And yet we've become bogged down. Too many Jewish leaders seem paralyzed by fear of the future. This moment in Jewish history demands bold thinking with big ideas; this is not a time for staying the course. It's time to reinvent the architecture of Jewish life. It's a time to cast a broad net, to explore options rather than to rule things out, and to recreate a Movement which will be as meaningful in the future as it has been in the past.”

Jacobs' formal installation, the first in 16 years, was held at Congregation Beth Elohim in Brooklyn, New York on June 9, 2012. In his address, Jacobs promised to turn the Reform Jewish movement into a “movement undergoing renovation that will renew Jewish life.” He called on Reform Jews to “stand up for Israel” against its critics while fighting to ensure that Israel preserves the democratic and liberal ideals dear to the Reform Movement at the same time, and expressed the hope that “one day soon the State of Israel will live in peace side by side with the State of Palestine.”

Rabbi Jacobs visits and speaks frequently throughout the Jewish world. In September 2012, he was named as the scholar-in- residence for The Jewish Federations of North America (JFNA)'s 2012 General Assembly, the largest annual gathering of the North American Jewish community. At the URJ 2013 Biennial convention, he spoke extensively about key themes in the organization's work to re-imagine Jewish life: youth engagement, partnerships, inclusion, Israel-Diaspora relations, and religious pluralism.

In 2016, Jacobs led an effort to encourage efforts to accommodate multi-denominational Judaism in Israel. In 2016 at government hearings on non-Orthodox prayer space at the Western Wall, MK And tourism Minister Yariv Levin slammed Reform Judaism, a small denomination in Israel but the largest Jewish movement in the United States, saying egalitarian prayer space at the Wall is unnecessary based on his opinion that Reform Jews will "be all but gone in three generations." Prime Minister Benjamin Netanyahu condemned Levin’s remarks and the Reform movement in the U.S. has decided to shun him. Rabbi Gilad Kariv, head of the progressive movement in Israel, called on his American partners to refuse access to Levin. Rabbi Jacobs agreed to cancel all meetings between Levin and Reform leaders. Jacobs told Israeli Army Radio: "There’s no reason to give him a platform in Jewish communities and organizations in the United States. Minister Levin will not teach us what support for Israel is.” The Central Conference of American Rabbis protested Levin's comments, saying "Minister Levin is entitled to his private beliefs. However, as a minister in the government of all Israel, he has an obligation to support the religious practice of all Israelis. His remarks on the supposed waning presence of U.S. Reform Jews reveal a bias against a religious movement that includes over a million and a half people." Informed of Netanyahu's criticism of his comments, Levin refused to backtrack. His office announced: "The tourism minister stands by what he said, and he would likely say it again."

In August 2026, Rabbi Jacobs was part of a group of ten rabbis who met with New York City mayor Zohran Mamdani to address concerns about antisemitism and that his statements against Israel and threats to arrest and stage protests against prime minister Benjamin Netanyahu are negatively impacting Jewish New Yorkers, stating that "the way he vilifies Israel, and so constantly, is really causing harm."

Jacobs responded to a post issued by New York City mayor Zohran Mamdani on October 7, 2026, the third anniversary of the October 7 attacks, which was perceived as downplaying Jewish grief by focusing on the impact on Palestinians in Gaza, saying that Mamdani's remarks were "callous to Jewish pain" on what should have been a day to address Jewish sorrow and that the mayor's effort to turn an October 7 statement "into an indictment of the Jewish state" would make "Jewish New Yorkers less safe".

=== Personal life ===
Jacobs is married to Susan Freedman, president of the Public Art Fund. The couple has three children, and resides in Scarsdale, NY. The family also owns an apartment in Jerusalem and visits Israel often.

== Publications ==
- David Ellenson; Richard Jacobs (February 1988). "Scholarship and Faith: David Hoffman and His Relationship to Wissenschaft des Judentums". Modern Judaism. 8 (1): 27–40. doi:10.1093/mj/8.1.27. JSTOR 1396119.
- Richard Jacobs (Summer 2000). "Forsaking the Status Quo in Scarsdale. How we transformed Westchester Reform Temple" (PDF). Reform Judaism. Archived from the original (PDF) on July 23, 2011.
- —— (May 26, 2002). "And You Shall Be A Blessing. Sermon for Baccalaureate Service". Cornell University. Archived from the original on July 15, 2010.
- —— (2003). "Being Accessible to the Other in our Lives (Pulpit Dad)". In Norman J. Cohen (ed.). Hineini in Our Lives. Learning How to Respond to Others Through 14 Biblical Texts & Personal Stories (PDF). Woodstock, VT: Jewish Lights Publishing. ISBN 978-1-58023-274-6.
- —— (Summer 2006). "On the Edge of Life". Reform Judaism. Archived from the original on October 5, 2007.
- —— (September 2007). "Sukkot 5768" (PDF). American Jewish World Service. Archived from the original (PDF) on December 13, 2010.
- —— (Winter 2009). "Keeping the Mice in Shul: Principles for Synagogue Transformation". CCAR Journal: A Reform Jewish Quarterly. Archived from the original on May 11, 2011.
- —— (September 18, 2010). "Standing Together for Israel. Sermon Yom Kippur 5771". Westchester Reform Temple Website. Archived from the original on March 18, 2011.
- —— (Winter 2010). "Synagogues and Federations: From Rivals to Partners". Journal of Jewish Communal Service. 85 (1).
- —— (Spring 2011). "Social Action: Haiti—Acts of God?". Reform Judaism. Archived from the original on May 11, 2011.
- Richard Jacobs (May 30, 2012). "A commitment to Israel will be hard to maintain if equality is not upheld". Haaretz. Archived from the original on May 30, 2012.
