= Bayview Correctional Facility =

Former women's prison in Manhattan, New York

- Bayview Correctional Facility opposite Chelsea Piers.
- Interactive map of Bayview Correctional Facility
- Location: Manhattan, New York; 40°44′47″N 74°00′27″W
- Status: Closed
- Security class: Medium security
- Population: 153 (October 2012)
- Closed: October 2012

Bayview Correctional Facility was a medium-security women's prison located at the south corner of West 20th Street and 11th Avenue in Manhattan, New York City, directly across the avenue from the Chelsea Piers sports complex. It was one of the few state penitentiaries in the middle of a major city in New York.

== History ==
Bayview consisted of one large building and did not have grounds and a fenced perimeter, although an annex was later added. The building was designed by Shreve, Lamb & Harmon and it began its life as housing for sailors before being converted in the 1970s into a jail which held a maximum of 323 women, which represented approximately half of New York State's female prison population.

Covering the entire south wall of Bayview is the Venus, a mural painted by New York artist Knox Martin in 1970. Venus was commissioned by Doris Freedman of CityWalls (later the Public Art Fund). Today, Venus is almost entirely obscured by the neighboring building 100 Eleventh Avenue, completed in 2010.

Featured on the New York State Correction Officer Informational Page's "History of Bayview" is the following statement:

In 1970, prior to the rejuvenation of the district, Bayview's entire south wall was decorated with a red and pink abstract painting, called "Venus" by artist Knox Martin. The mural, conspicuous for its size and beauty, has often been used on post cards. It is also conspicuous—in a culture that regards large, exposed surface as prime advertising space—for not being a billboard. Not surprisingly, advertisers call from time to time with proposals to lease the wall for commercial messages, but Bayview doesn't want its beautiful Venus covered over with a beer or jeans ad. Besides, it's state property.

Before Superstorm Sandy hit in October 2012, Bayview's 153 prisoners were evacuated and sent to other facilities. The building sustained US$600,000 (equivalent to $841,426 in 2025) worth of damage as a result of storm damage and remained closed due to NYS Budgetary reasons. Following the announcement that the building would be sold, a number of plans for its future developed. Among those was a center for women's advocacy under the auspices of the NoVo Foundation, which was abandoned in 2019. As of 2020, the building's future status is unknown.
