= Knox Martin =

American painter, sculptor, and muralist (1923–2022)

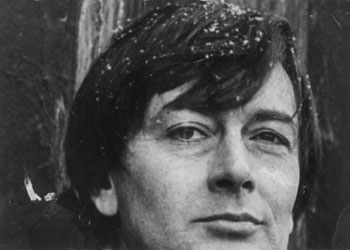
- Born: February 12, 1923; Barranquilla, Colombia
- Died: May 15, 2022 (aged 99)
- Education: Art Students League of New York
- Known for: Painter, muralist, sculptor
- Notable work: Venus (1970), Woman with bicycle (1979)
- Movement: Abstract expressionism, New York School
- Awards: Chevalier of the Legion of Honour

Knox Martin (February 12, 1923 – May 15, 2022) was an American painter, sculptor, and muralist.

Born in Barranquilla, Colombia, he studied at the Art Students League of New York from 1946 until 1950. He was one of the leading members of the New York School of artists and writers. He lived and worked in New York City.

== Early life ==
Knox Martin was the oldest son of Lieutenant William Knox Martin, a Virginia-born early aviation pioneer and flyer, and his wife Isabel Vieco, who were married in the Canal Zone in Panama in 1921. Knox Martin Sr., a painter, poet, and early test pilot, was the first man to fly over the Andes mountains. Six years after his marriage, Martin Sr. was fatally injured in an automobile accident in Watertown, New York. His widow Isabel relocated with her three young sons from Salem, Virginia, to New York City.

== Early career ==
After serving in the United States Coast Guard during World War II, Martin attended the Art Students League of New York on the G.I. Bill from 1946 to 1950, where he studied with Harry Sternberg, Vaclav Vytlacil, Will Barnet, and Morris Kantor.

In 1954, Martin's friend Franz Kline placed a painting of his in the Stable Gallery Annual. Charles Egan of the Charles Egan Gallery saw Martin's painting at the Stable Gallery and asked him to show his work in a one-man show for the tenth anniversary of the Egan Gallery.

== Work ==
Martin is best known for his repertory of signs and symbols that allude to nature and, in particular, to the female form. Flatly and freely painted in brilliant colors, his works were often executed on a grand scale, as in |the outdoor wall painting, Woman with Bicycle, at West Houston and MacDougal Streets in Manhattan. He mostly created painting, sculpture and wall paintings using media such as acrylic, collage, fresco, ink drawing (pen and ink), mixed media/multimedia, and oil.

One of his wall paintings in New York City is the twelve-story mural Venus.

Venus mural

Commissioned in 1970 by Doris Freedman of CityWalls (later the Public Art Fund), Venus is located on the south side of Bayview Correctional Facility at 19th Street and the West Side Highway.

"Traditionally the goddess of love and fertility, Venus represents woman, erotic and supple, but it also conveys Martin's love affair with New York. Venus is his love poem to the city where he has always lived, a place that is part of his being. The feminine, curvilinear shapes of the image are in direct contrast with the straight forms that intersect the composition. The overwhelming size of this enormous mural only intensifies the experience of female shapes, the linear aspects of the painted composition, and of the surrounding architecture. In an era when art was reaching out to the masses with pop culture, this huge mural was Martin's way of touching a public that would never venture into an art gallery."

== Collections ==
Martin's work is included in the collections of Whitney Museum of American Art, Museum of Modern Art, Hirshhorn Museum and Sculpture Garden, Art Students League of New York, Brooklyn Museum of Art, National Academy of Design, National Arts Club, New York University, Addison Gallery of American Art, Albright-Knox Art Gallery, Art Institute of Chicago, Art Museum of Southeast Texas, Baltimore Museum of Art, Berkeley Art Museum, Blanton Museum of Art, Boca Raton Museum of Art, Chrysler Museum of Art, Corcoran Gallery of Art, Dallas Museum of Art, Davis Museum at Wellesley College, Denver Art Museum, Hand Art Center, Herbert F. Johnson Museum of Art, Heckscher Museum of Art, Hofstra University Museum, Indianapolis Museum of Art, Ithaca Museum, Lowe Art Museum, George Washington University, Montclair Art Museum, Minneapolis Institute of Arts, Museum of Art Fort Lauderdale, Newark Museum, Oklahoma City Museum of Art, Portland Art Museum, Provincetown Art Association and Museum, Reading Public Museum, Southern Alleghenies Museum of Art, Springfield Art Museum, The Museum of Fine Arts, Houston, Toledo Museum of Art, University of Kentucky Art Museum, University of Maine Museum of Art, Weatherspoon Art Museum, William Benton Museum of Art, Israel Museum, Ludwig Museum in Budapest, and the Bibliothèque Nationale.

== Grants, Awards and Honors ==
Martin was the recipient of numerous grants, including two Pollock-Krasner Foundation Grants (2008 and 1988), Adolph and Esther Gottlieb Foundation Grant (1991), C.A.P.S. Grant (1978), an NEA Artist Fellowship (1973), and three Longview Fellowship purchase awards (1958 and 1957).

In 2002, Martin was named to the National Academy of Design. Subsequently, Martin received painting awards from the National Academy of Design including the Desser Award for Painting (2005), the Kept Memorial Prize (2007), the Mary & Maxwell Desser Memorial Award (2009), and the J. Sanford Saltus Medal for Painting (2009).

In 2012, Martin was awarded the Benjamin West Clinedinst Memorial Medal by the Artists' Fellowship, Inc. "for the achievement of exceptional artistic merit".

In 2016, France conferred the insignia of Chevalier of the Legion of Honor on Martin for his contribution in World War II to the liberation of France.

== Teaching ==
Martin gave a master class at the Art Students League of New York for over 45 years. Earlier he taught at Yale Graduate School of Art, first as visiting critic in art, invited by Jack Tworkov, and then as Professor of Art. He also taught at New York University, the University of Minnesota, and the International School of Painting, Drawing and Sculpture in Umbria, Italy.

== Later work ==
September 15 to November 13, 2010, Martin had a one-man show of his Black and White Paintings at Woodward Gallery in New York City.

October 6, 2012 to April 6, 2013, Martin had a solo exhibition of recent paintings, SHE, at the Sam & Adele Golden Gallery at Golden Artist Colors in New Berlin, New York.

September 13 to October 26, 2013 saw the Knox Martin Exhibition SHE at the LGTripp Gallery in Philadelphia.

On November 14, 2016, France conferred the insignia of the Legion of Honour on Martin for his contribution to the liberation of France during World War II.

From May 2 to June 1, 2019, Martin had a solo show, Knox Martin: Radical Structures, at Hollis Taggart Galleries in New York City.

October 18 to December 7, 2019, Martin had a solo show, Knox Martin: New York 1962-2019, at Nancy Littlejohn Fine Art in Houston, Texas.

July 18 to October 11, 2020, Martin had a solo museum exhibition, "Knox Martin: Living Legend", at the Arlington Museum of Art in Arlington, Texas.

April 3 to May 1, 2021, Martin had a solo show, Knox Martin: Red and Black, at Nancy Littlejohn Fine Art in Houston, Texas.

July 8 to August 6, 2021, Martin had a solo show, Knox Martin: Homage to Goya, at Hollis Taggart Galleries in New York City.

January 6 to February 5, 2022, Martin had a solo show, Knox Martin: Garden of Time, at Hollis Taggart Galleries in New York City.

Knox Martin was represented by Hollis Taggart Galleries.

October 23, 2026, to January 3, 2027, the Art Students League presented Knox Martin: Legacies featuring works from Martin and his son Jonathan Martin’s private collection.

== Personal life and death ==
Martin died on May 15, 2022, at the age of 99.

== Books ==
- Marika Herskovic, New York School Abstract Expressionists Artists Choice by Artists, (New York School Press, 2000.) ISBN 0-9677994-0-6
- Irving Sandler, From Avant-Garde to Pluralism: An On-The-Spot History, (Hard Press Editions, 2006.) ISBN 1889097683
