= Woman with Bicycle =

Mural by Knox Martin in New York City

Coordinates: 40°43′40.3″N 74°0′7.8″W

Woman with Bicycle

Woman with Bicycle is a six-story wall painting created by the American painter, sculptor and muralist Knox Martin in 1979 under the sponsorship of the Public Art Fund. The mural is dedicated to the memory of his friend and mentor Elias Goldberg.

== Former Landmark ==
A well-known New York City art landmark, Woman with Bicycle was located at Houston and MacDougal Streets in Manhattan. Vivian Raynor of The New York Times wrote in 1981 of Knox Martin and Woman with Bicycle:

The artist is best known for his repertory of signs and symbols that allude to nature and, in particular, to the female form. Flatly and freely painted in Pop colors, they have often been executed on a grand scale, as in the outdoor mural at West Houston and MacDougal Streets in Manhattan.

— Vivian Raynor, The New York Times

In 2002, Woman with Bicycle was covered over with an underwear ad.

== See also ==
- Venus (mural)
