= Cleburne Building =

Apartment building in Manhattan, New York

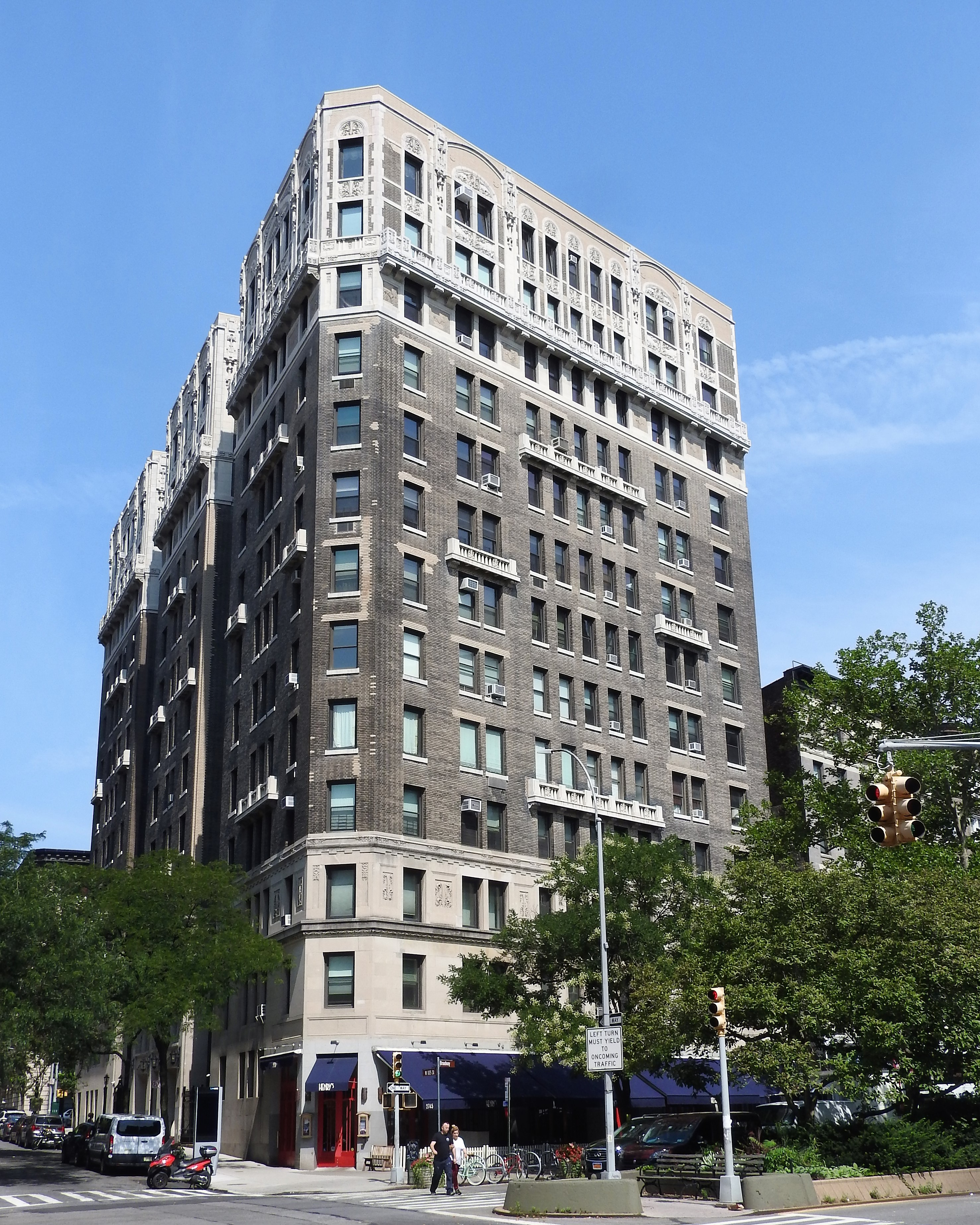
- Eastern end, on Broadway
- Alternative names: 924 West End Avenue

General information
- Type: Cooperative
- Architectural style: Arts and Crafts Movement
- Location: West End Avenue and 105th Street, New York, NY, United States
- Coordinates: 40.8011°N 73.9688°W
- Construction started: 1912
- Completed: 1913
- Owner: Harry Schiff

Technical details
- Structural system: Skyscraper
- Floor count: 13

Design and construction
- Architects: Schwartz & Gross

The Cleburne Building (also known as 924 West End Avenue) is an apartment building located at the northeast corner of West End Avenue and West 105th Street on the Upper West Side of Manhattan, New York City.

The Cleburne was completed in 1913 by real estate developer Harry Schiff on the site of the mansion of Mr. and Mrs. Isidor Straus who perished on the RMS Titanic. There is a memorial to Mr. and Mrs. Straus in nearby Straus Park.

The building, which is designed in the Arts and Crafts Movement style, has a handsome porte-cochère.

== Notable residents ==
- Madeleine L'Engle
- Estelle Parsons
- Andy Borowitz
- Norman Podhoretz and Midge Decter
- Charlie Smalls, composer of "The Wiz"
