= Eleventh Avenue (Manhattan) =

North–south avenue in Manhattan, New York

- West End Avenue (59th–107th streets)
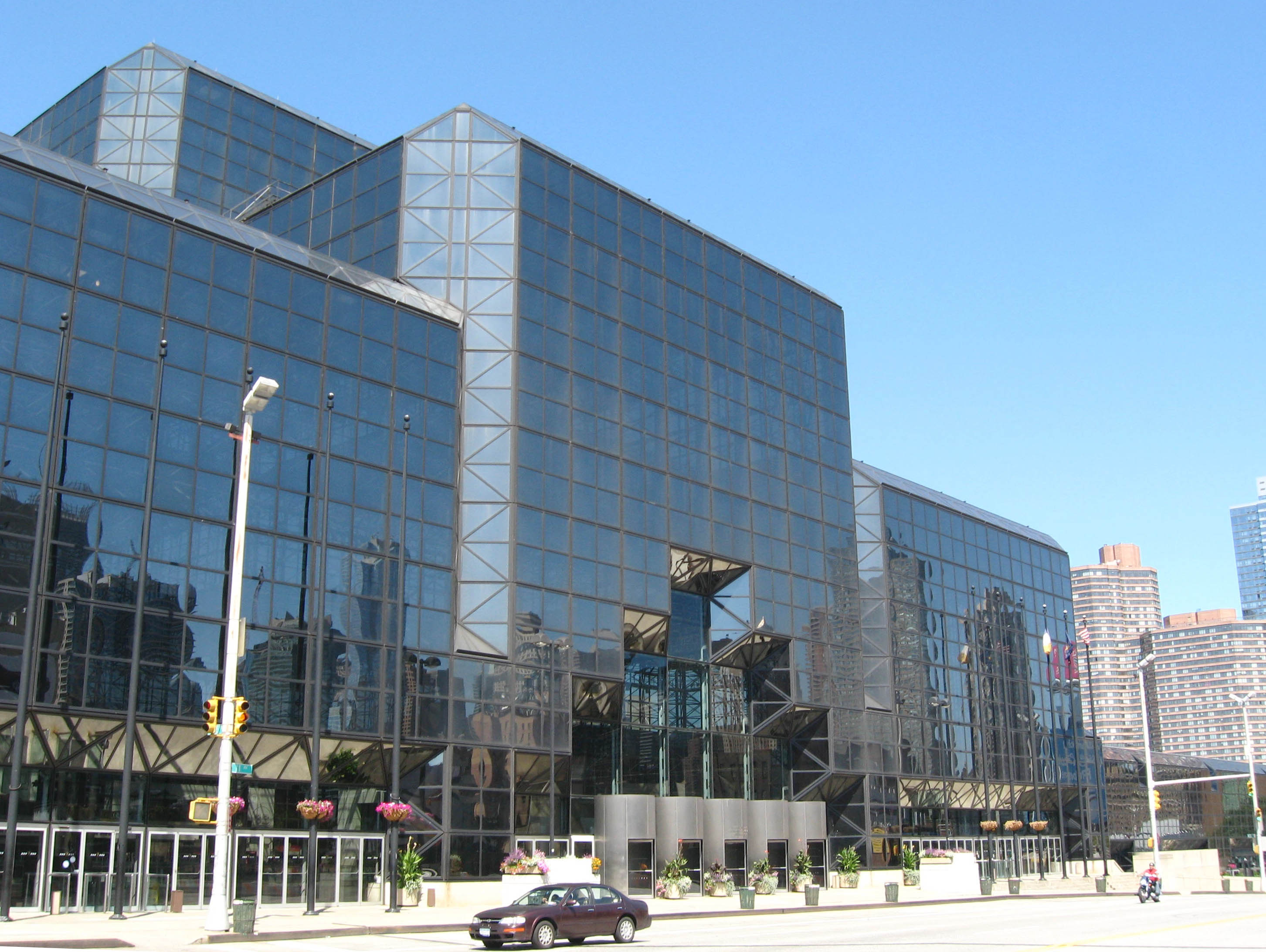
- The Jacob K. Javits Convention Center
- Interactive map of Eleventh Avenue
- Owner: City of New York
- Maintained by: NYCDOT
- Length: 6.1 mi (9.8 km)
- Location: Manhattan, New York City
- South end: West Street
- North end: Broadway (Manhattan)
- East: Tenth Avenue (Gansevoort to 59th Streets)
- West: Twelfth Avenue (22nd to 59th Streets); Henry Hudson Parkway (above 59th Street)

Construction
- Commissioned: March 1811

Eleventh Avenue is a north–south thoroughfare on the far West Side of the borough of Manhattan in New York City, located near the Hudson River. Eleventh Avenue originates in the Meatpacking District in the Greenwich Village and West Village neighborhoods at Gansevoort Street, where Eleventh Avenue, Tenth Avenue, and West Street intersect. It is considered part of the West Side Highway between 22nd and Gansevoort Streets.

Between 59th and 107th Streets, the avenue is known as West End Avenue. Both West End Avenue and Eleventh Avenue are considered to be part of the same road.

== Description ==
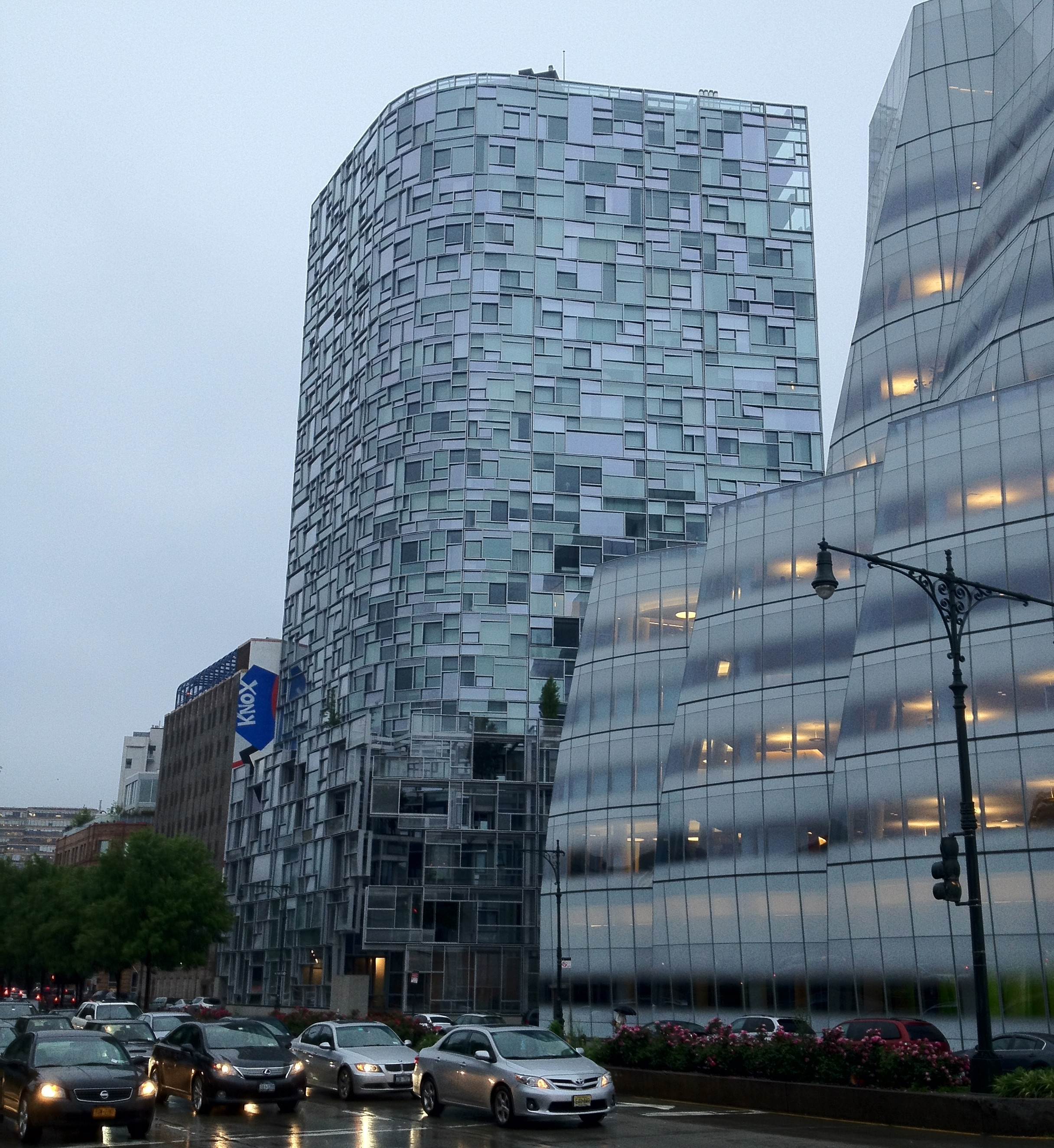
100 Eleventh Avenue

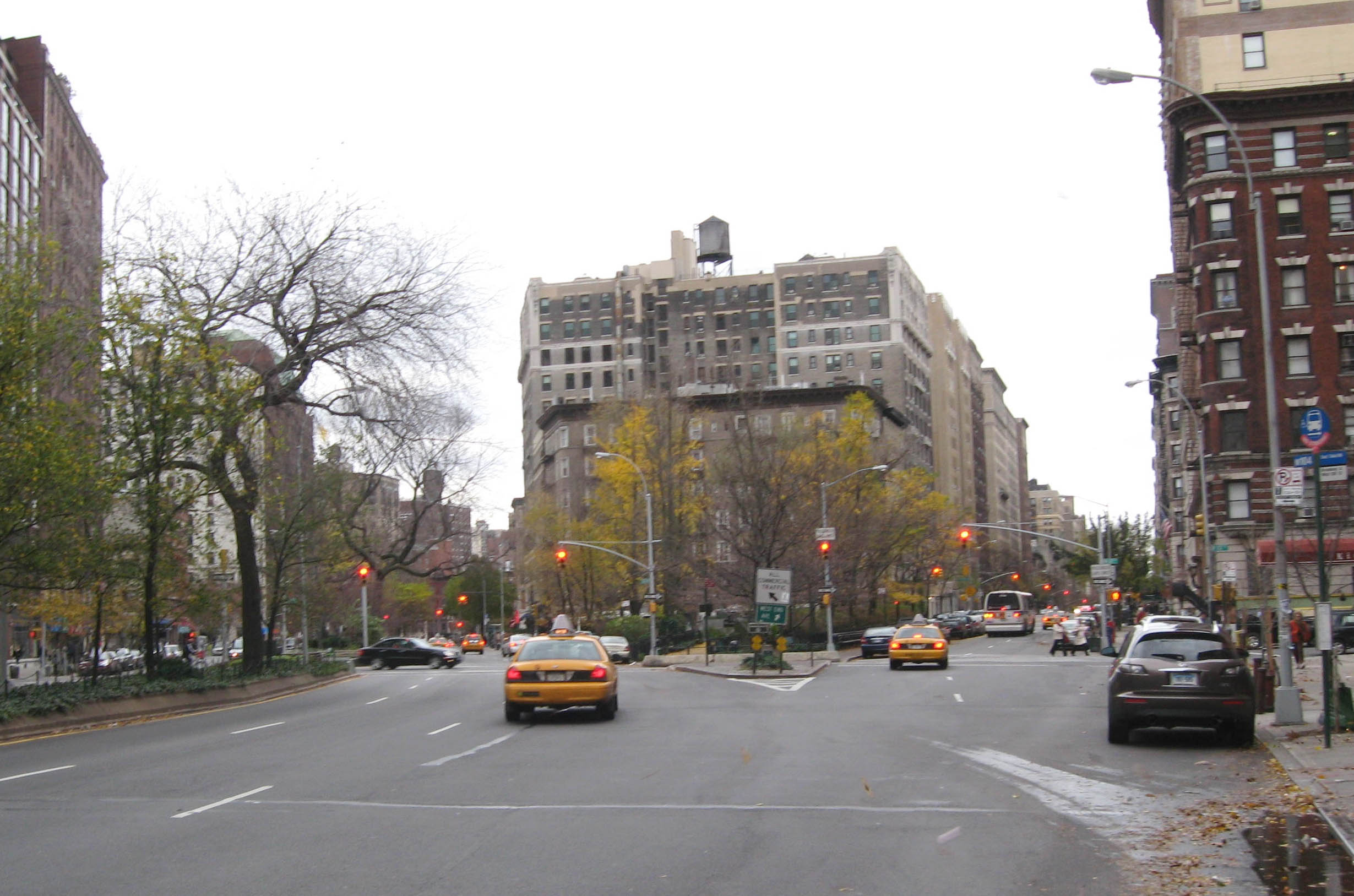
Straus Park and the upper end of West End Avenue

Between Gansevoort Street and West 22nd Street on the far West Side of Manhattan in New York City, near the Hudson River, Eleventh Avenue is part of the West Side Highway, a wide boulevard. At a split with Twelfth Avenue/West Side Highway at West 22nd Street, Eleventh Avenue continues as a standard-width avenue.

Following the split, Eleventh Avenue is two-way traffic for access to 23rd Street, as well as for 24th Street to access Chelsea Piers. North of 24th Street, Eleventh Avenue is one-way southbound from 24th to 34th Streets, where two-way traffic resumes for access to the Lincoln Tunnel. The segment between approximately 39th and 59th Streets is home to the largest concentration of auto dealerships in Manhattan. Eleventh Avenue again becomes one-way southbound between 40th and 57th Streets; two-way traffic resumes north of 57th Street.

The portion north of 59th Street is called West End Avenue, which has mixed commercial and residential use. The northern 2 miles (3.2 km) are a sedate Upper West Side residential street ending at Straus Park, 107th Street, and Broadway. Traffic is bidirectional, except for the northernmost block, north of 106th Street.

== History ==
The West Side Line of the New York Central Railroad once had on-street running along part of Eleventh Avenue, which, along with Tenth Avenue, become known as "Death Avenue" because of the large number of deaths that occurred due to train–pedestrian collisions. In 1929, the city, the state, and New York Central agreed on the West Side Improvement Project, conceived by Robert Moses, and allocated funds for an elevated railway that would eliminate the grade crossings and alleviate the problems along Tenth and Eleventh Avenues; it also included construction of the West Side Elevated Highway.

Meanwhile, the avenue's West End Avenue section was originally created in the 1880s as the northern extension of Eleventh Avenue, and was intended to be a commercial street serving the residents of the mansions to be constructed along Riverside Drive. When West End Avenue was named in the 1880s, the Upper West Side was fairly sparsely populated, and that upper portion of the avenue, subsequently, was called the "West End" because of its separation from the core of the city. Seeking to distinguish the area from the factories and tenements below 59th Street, a group of real estate developers renamed the northern portions of the West Side's avenues.

Portions of both West End Avenue and Eleventh Avenue were run down in the mid-20th century, with single room occupancy hotels, prostitutes and drug addicts a common sight. The city's economic comeback in the 1980s brought recovery and gentrification.

The upper portion of the avenue retains stretches of late nineteenth-century town houses and several handsome churches and synagogues, but is almost entirely made up of handsome residential buildings about twelve stories tall built in the first decades of the twentieth century. The near total absence of retail on that part of the street marks its quiet, residential character, as opposed to the high-traffic, noisy character of Eleventh Avenue.

== Architecture ==
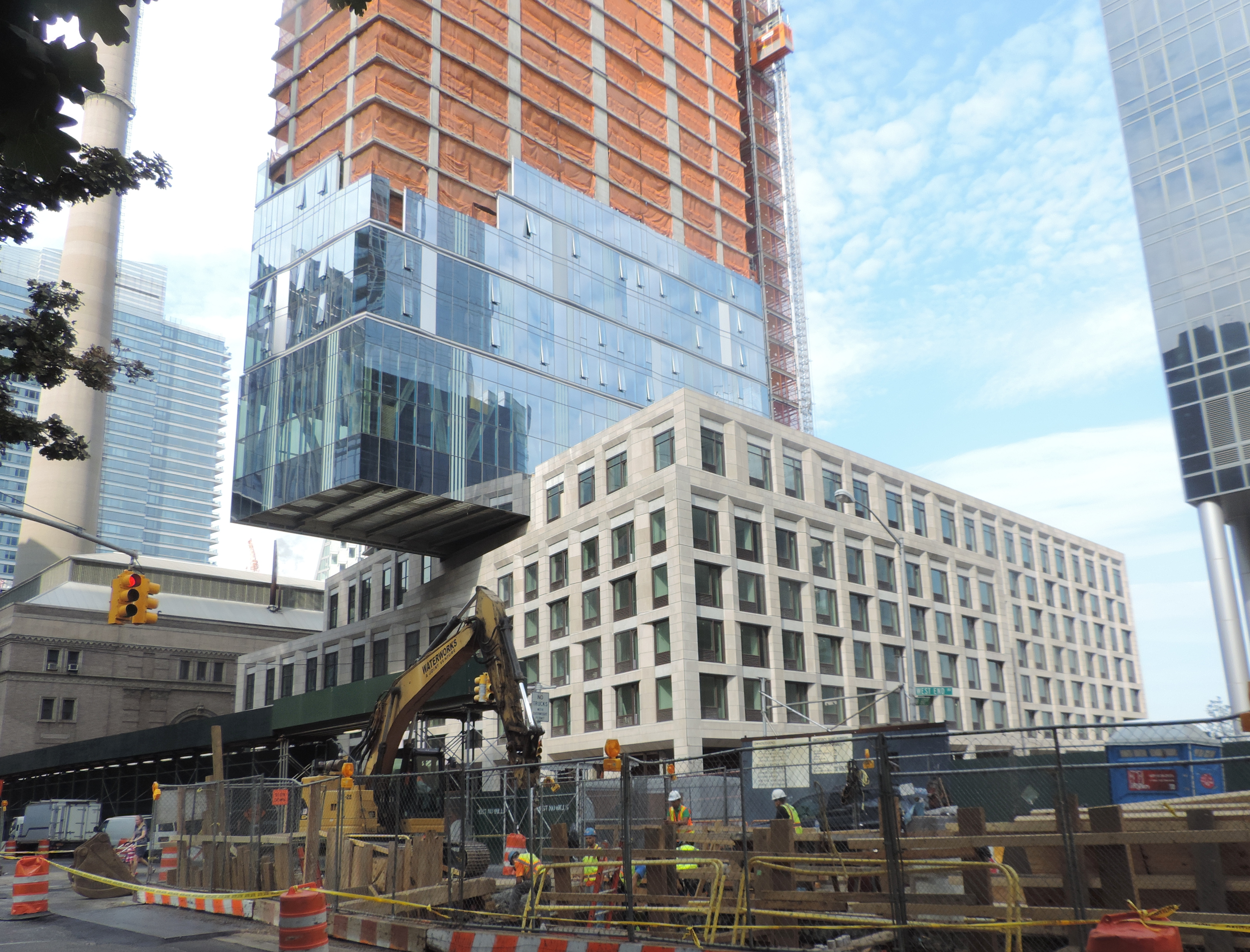
10 West End Avenue under construction

The architecture of buildings on Eleventh and West End Avenues differs significantly. West End Avenue is noteworthy for its almost unbroken street wall of handsome apartment buildings punctuated by brief stretches of nineteenth-century townhouses and several handsome churches and synagogues. Notable architecturally historicist houses of worship include:

- Ansche Chesed, in Byzantine Revival style
- Saint Ignatius of Antioch Episcopal Church in English Gothic revival style
- West End Collegiate Church in Dutch Colonial, a subset of Renaissance Revival style
- Annunciation Greek Orthodox Church

Among the more notable apartment buildings are:

- The Apthorp
- Cleburne Building at 105th Street
- 520 West End Avenue, the former Leech mansion, which is now landmarked
- Lincoln Towers, six-building residential complex on 20 acres (8.1 ha) between 66th and 70th streets, built in the 1960s

Eleventh Avenue, meanwhile, is lined with new-age residential buildings – such as 100 Eleventh Avenue – adjacent to warehouses and car dealerships.

Between 34th and 59th Streets there are a number of new car dealerships including Audi Manhattan, BMW-Mini of Manhattan, Cadillac of Manhattan, Chrysler-Dodge-Jeep-Ram-Fiat of Manhattan, Land Rover Manhattan, Toyota-Lexus of Manhattan, Manhattan Motorcars, Mercedes-Benz of Manhattan, Open Road Volkswagen, and Volvo Cars Manhattan. Additionally, numerous vehicle service stations, car washes, and car rental lots are found along this stretch.

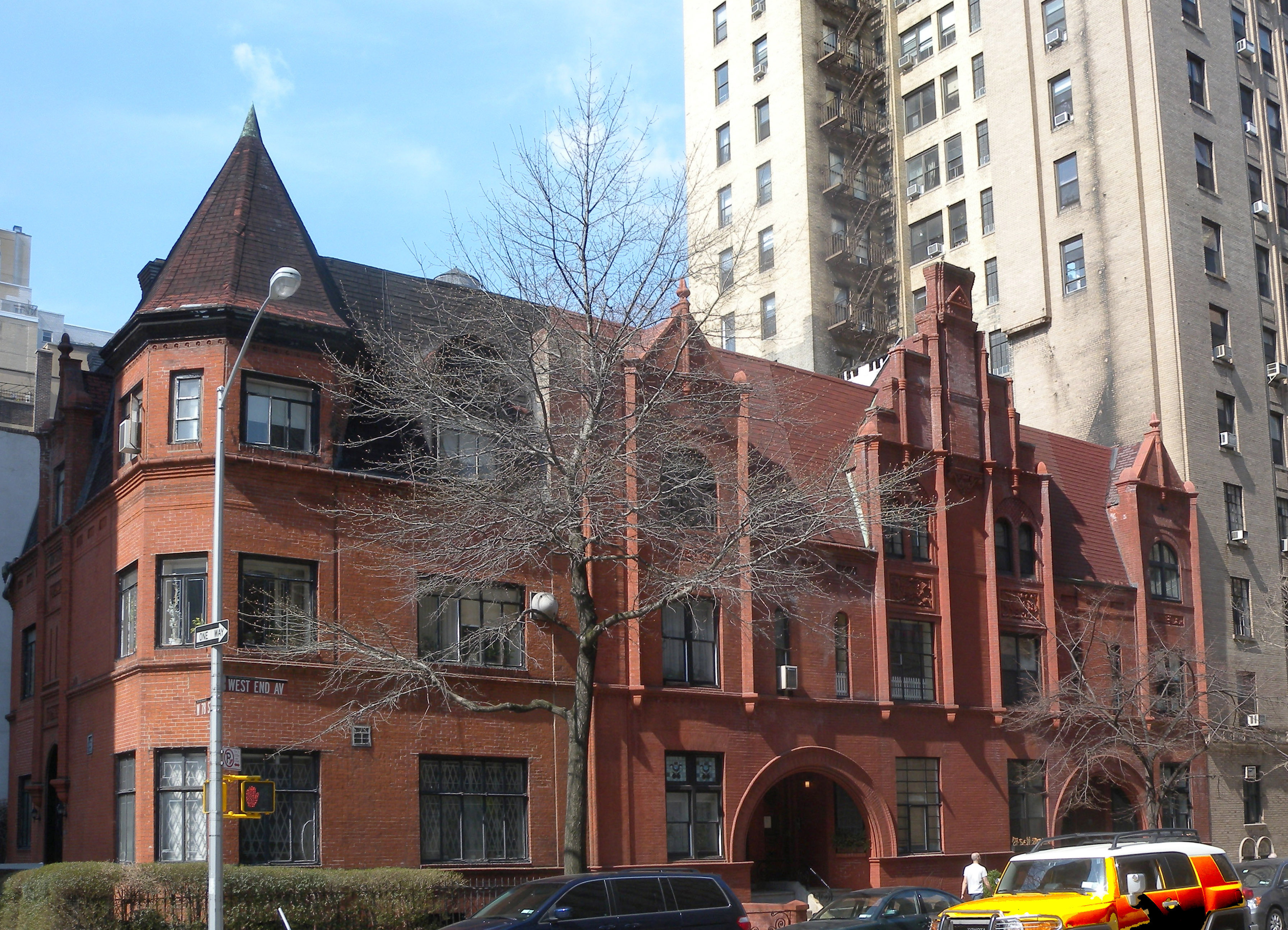
381 to 389 West End Avenue, north end of Riverside-West End Historic District

This area has served the transport trade for more than a hundred years; most of the stables for New York's remaining horse cabs are located on its side streets, though many now store taxis and pedicabs. It is not uncommon to hear the clip clop of horses in the vicinity, as a result. The carriage horses live in historic stables originally built in the 19th century, but today boast the latest in barn design, such as fans, misting systems, box stalls, and state-of-the-art sprinkler systems. As horses always have in densely populated urban areas, the carriage horses live upstairs in their stables while the carriages are parked below on the ground floor.

=== Historic districts ===
One historic district lies on Eleventh Avenue, the West Chelsea Historic District, designated in 2008.

Two segments of West End Avenue lie within designated New York City historic districts: both sides of the avenue from 87th to 94th Street can be found in the Riverside-West End Historic District. The west side of the avenue from 75th Street through mid-block between 78th and 79th streets, and the east side between 76th and 77th streets are contained within the West End-Collegiate Historic District. Concern over building demolition filings for the demolition of three row houses and a six-story elevator apartment building at the southwest corner of West End Avenue and 86th Street spurred a grassroots effort to seek historic district designation for the entire stretch north of Lincoln Towers from 70th to 107th Street. On March 18, 2009, the West End Avenue Preservation Society formally submitted a request for evaluation to the chair of the city's Landmarks Preservation Commission along with a 260-page survey prepared by Andrew Dolkart.

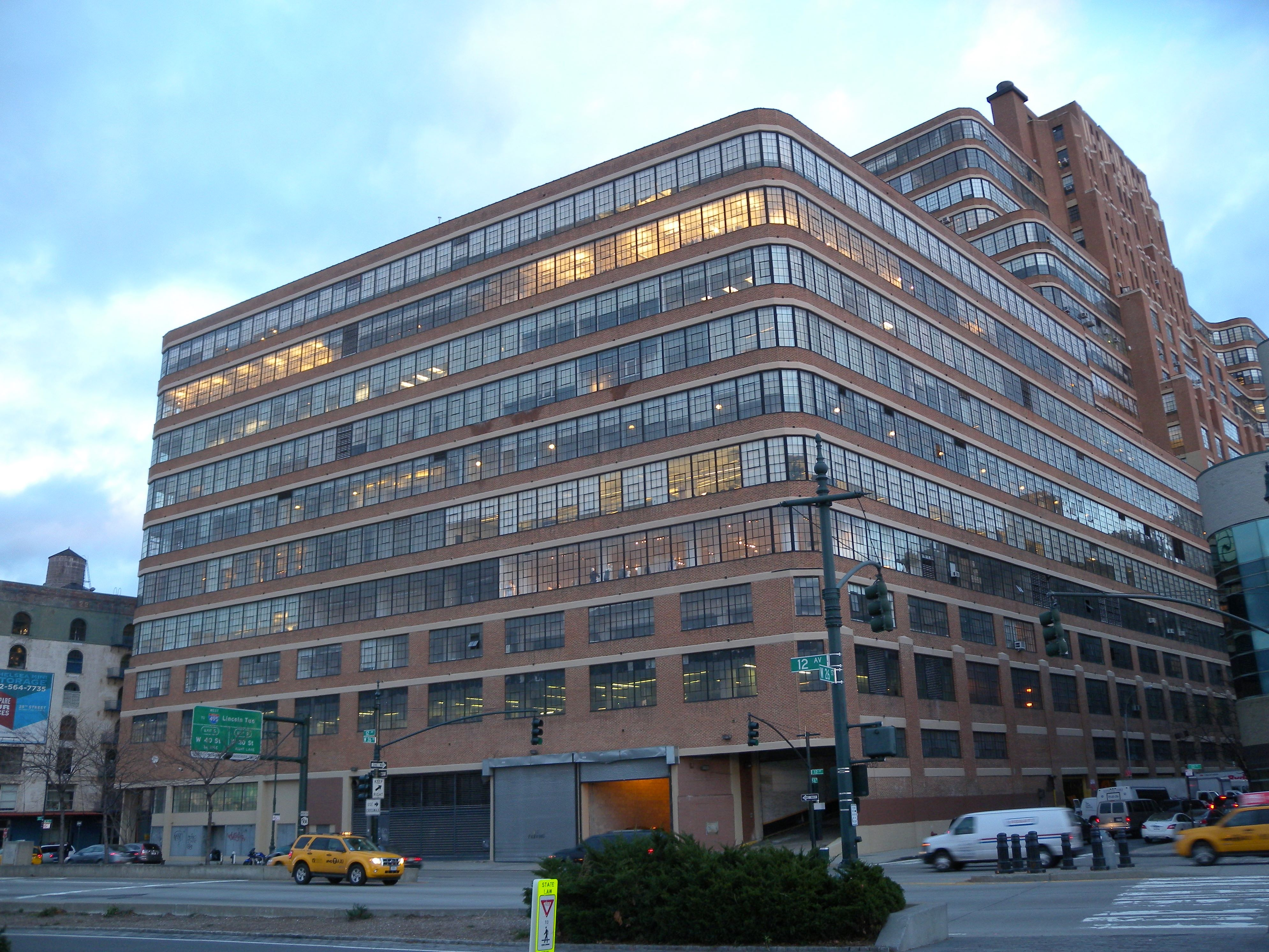
Starrett-Lehigh Building

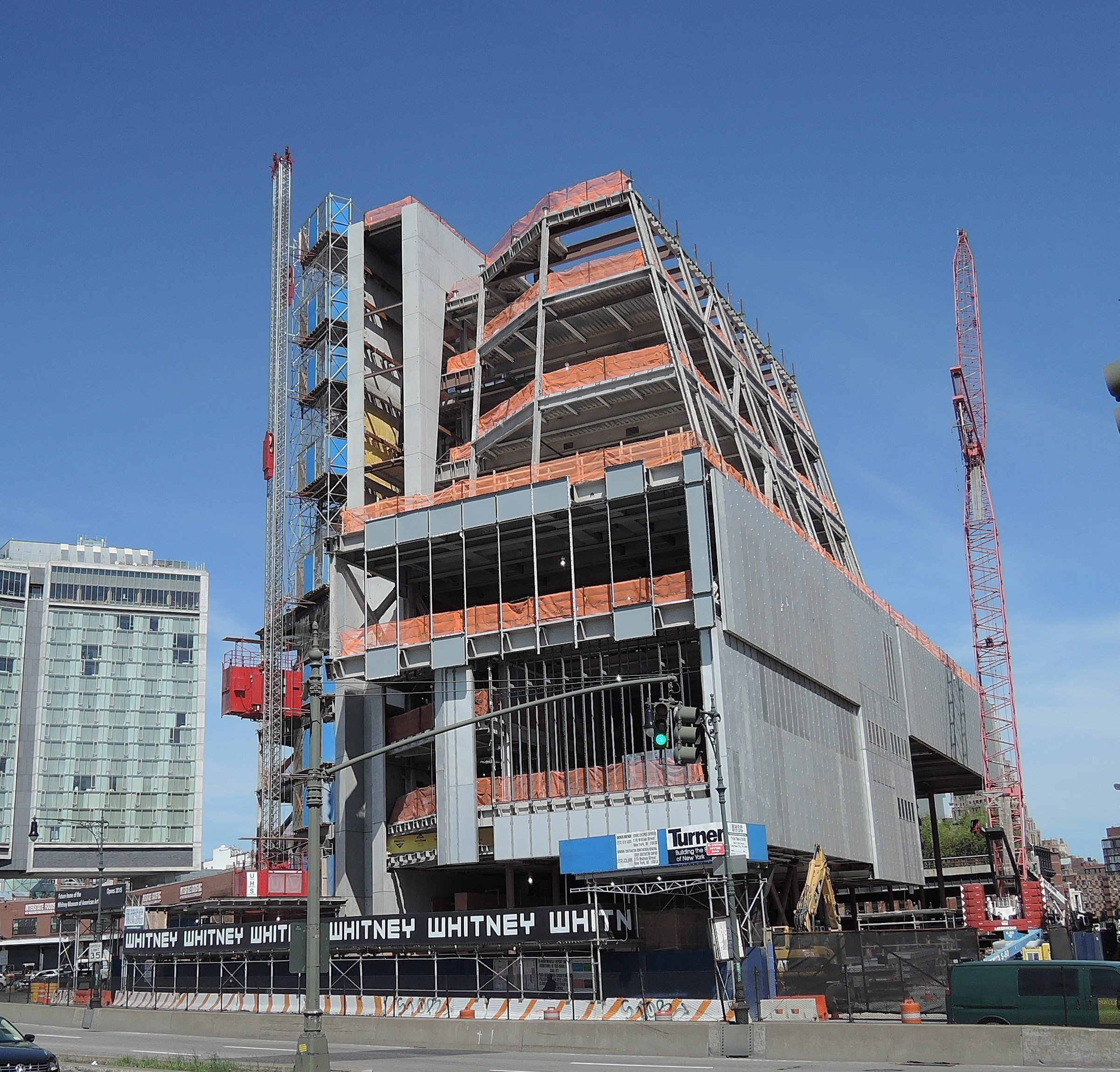
Whitney Museum of American Art at Gansevoort Street and Eleventh Avenue under construction in 2013

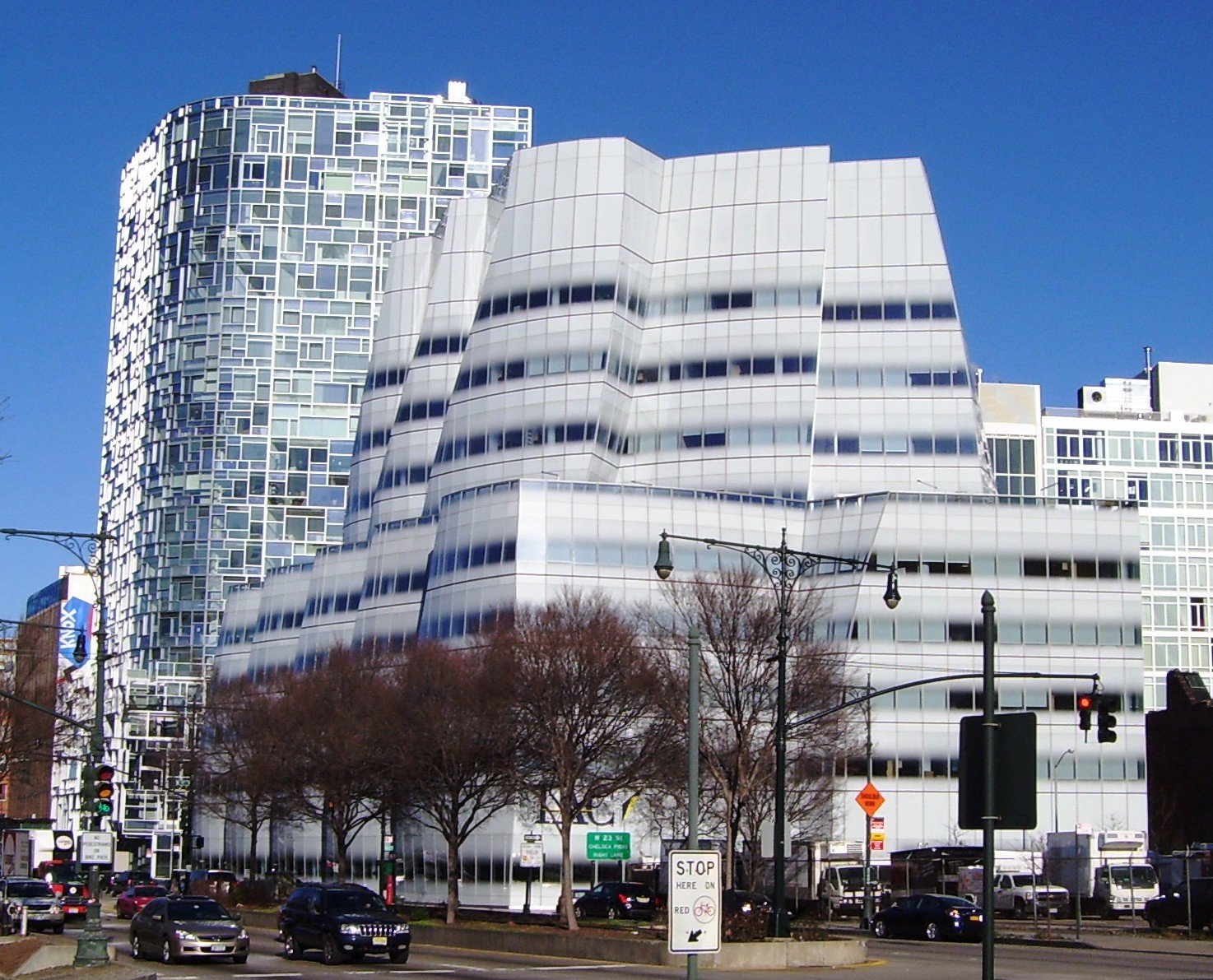
The IAC Building with Jean Nouvel's 100 Eleventh Avenue (behind and to the left) in 2010

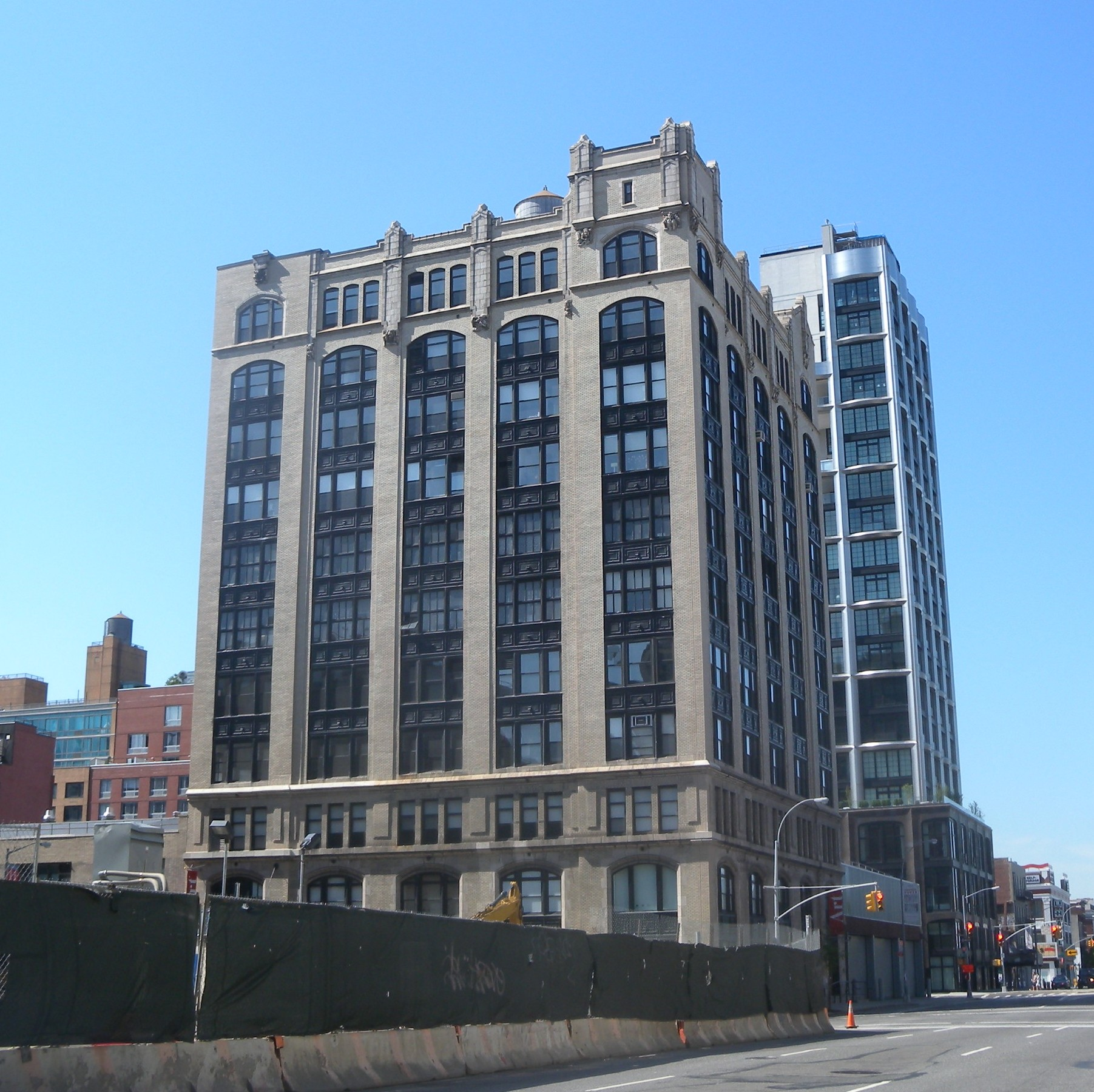
Eleventh Avenue, looking south at 26th Street

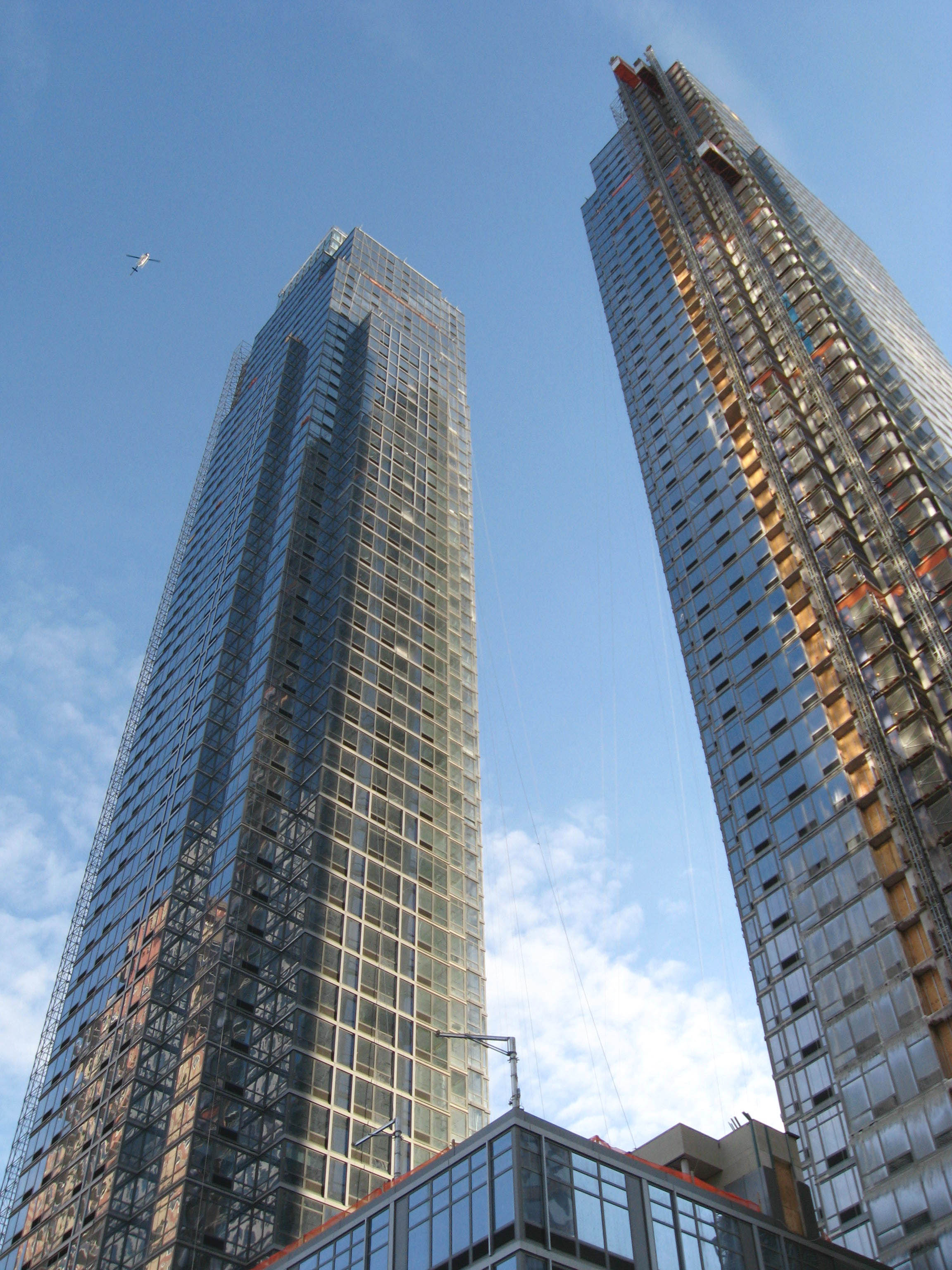
Silver Towers

=== Points of interest ===
Points of interest on or within one block of Eleventh Avenue include:

- 3 Hudson Boulevard at 34th/35th Streets
- 15 Hudson Yards and attached Culture Shed (at 30th Street)
- 35 Hudson Yards (at 33rd Street)
- 55 Hudson Yards (between 33rd and 34th Streets)
- 100 Eleventh Avenue, designed by Jean Nouvel
- 200 Eleventh Avenue, corner of West 24th Street, designed by Annabelle Selldorf, includes apartments with a "Sky Garage", allowing cars to be parked directly outside the apartment.
- Chelsea Market (between 9th and 10th Avenues and 15th and 16th Streets, one block east of 11th Avenue)
- Chelsea Piers (from 18th to 23rd Streets along the West Side Highway segment of Eleventh Avenue)
- Comedy Central
  - Former studios of The Colbert Report (at 54th Street)
  - Studios of The Daily Show (at 51st Street)
- Former site of the Copacabana nightclub (at 34th Street); the nightclub is now at 47th Street in Midtown; site occupied by the 34th Street–Hudson Yards subway entrance as of 2014
- DeWitt Clinton Park (between 52nd and 54th Streets)
- The High Line (roughly parallel to Eleventh Avenue from Gansevoort Street to 34th Street)
- The Hudson River Park (parallel to the West Side Highway segment of Eleventh Avenue from 11th Street to 22nd Street; also manages the Chelsea Waterside Park on the west side of Eleventh Avenue between 22nd and 24th Streets)
- IAC Building (at 19th Street)
- The Javits Center (between 34th and 39th Streets)
- Merchants Refrigerating Company Warehouse (at 16th–17th Streets)
- Michael J. Quill Bus Depot of the MTA (at 41st Street)
- Pier 57 (at 15th Street)
- Silver Towers (at 41st/42nd Streets)
- Starrett-Lehigh Building (at 26th/27th Streets)
- The Whitney Museum of American Art (at Gansevoort Street)

Points of interest on or within one block of West End Avenue include:

- Abraham Joshua Heschel School's high school division (at 60th Street)
- Calhoun School (between 80th and 81st Streets)
- Collegiate School (between 77th and 78th Streets)
- Lincoln Towers (between 66th and 70th Streets, with all buildings having West End Avenue addresses)
- Pomander Walk (between 95th and 96th Streets)
- Riverside Park (one block west of West End Avenue north of 72nd Street)
- Straus Park (between 106th and 107th Streets)

== Mass transit ==
Eleventh Avenue has been served by the New York City Subway's 7 and <7> trains, built as part of the 7 Subway Extension, at a station under the avenue at 34th Street, since September 2015.

The New York City Bus's M12 route serves the portion of 11th Avenue from West 15th to West 24th Streets (uptown) and from West 57th to West 18th Streets (downtown). Plans for the bus route were formulated in early 2014. Where 11th Avenue is one-way downtown, uptown buses use 12th Avenue.

Other bus routes include the following:

- The M57 crosstown bus route serves 11th Avenue north of West 57th Street and West End Avenue south of West 72nd Street in both directions, with the M72 north of West 70th Street.
- The M23 SBS runs in both directions between West 23rd and West 24th Streets.
- Several crosstown bus routes use the road to loop around and change directions:
  - The westbound M14D+ Select Bus runs from West 15th to West 18th Streets. Eastbound buses use 9th Avenue.
  - The westbound M31 runs from West 57th to West 54th Streets. Eastbound buses use 10th Avenue.
  - The westbound M34+ Select Bus runs from West 34th to West 33rd Streets. Eastbound buses use 12th Avenue.
  - The M66 begins eastbound service running from West 66th to West 65th Streets.
  - The M86+ Select Bus terminates at West 87th Street westbound, then runs out of service to West 86th Street.
  - The M96 and M106 run from West 97th to West 96th Streets, where they terminate.

== Notable residents ==
Notable current and former residents include:

- Harry Belafonte (1927–2023), folk singer, actor, and activist lived in a 6-bedroom, 21-room apartment at 300 West End Avenue for 48 years. Because he had been turned away from other apartment buildings, he had his white publicist rent an apartment at 300 WEA for him. When he moved in, and the owner realized that he was an African American, he was asked to leave. Belafonte not only refused, he used three dummy real estate companies to buy the building and converted it into a co-op, inviting his friends, both white and black, to buy apartments. At Belafonte's invitation, the apartment became the New York City base of operations for Martin Luther King, Jr.
- Judy Collins (born 1939), folk singer and song writer resides at 845 West End Avenue.
- Domenico Dolce (born 1958), fashion designer, at 200 Eleventh Avenue.
- Tina Fey (born 1970), former SNL cast member and creator of NBC's 30 Rock lives on West End Avenue near 80th Street.
- Joseph Heller (1923–1990), wrote Catch-22 while living at 390 West End Avenue.
- Lena Horne (1917–2010), dancer, actress, singer, and activist lived in a penthouse at 300 West End Avenue in the 1960s.
- Elena Kagan (born 1960), Associate Justice of the Supreme Court of the United States, grew up on West End Avenue and 75th Street.
- Nicole Kidman (born 1967), actress, lives at 200 Eleventh Avenue.
- Jesse L. Lasky (1880–1958), the theatrical and burlesque producer lived at 601 West End Avenue.
- Madeleine L'Engle (1918–2007), author, wrote A Wrinkle in Time and its sequels while living in the Cleburne Building at 924 West End Avenue.
- Anna Netrebko (born 1971), operatic soprano, has an apartment on the 32nd floor of 10 West End Avenue.
- Estelle Parsons (born 1927), actress, lived in the Cleburne Building.
- Mary Petty (1899–1976), illustrator and author.
- Norman Podhoretz (1930–2025) and Midge Decter (1927–2022)
- Sergei Rachmaninoff (1873–1943), composer, virtuoso pianist, and conductor, lived at 505 West End Avenue.
- L'Wren Scott (1964–2014), model, fashion designer, and stylist, lived at 200 Eleventh Avenue.
- Charlie Smalls (1943–1987), composer of The Wiz.
- The rural mansion of Isidor Straus (1845–1912) and Ida Straus (1849–1912) was located between West End and Broadway at 105th on the site of the present Cleburne Building.
- Keith Urban (born 1967), singer, lived at 200 Eleventh Avenue with former wife Nicole Kidman.
- Ludwig von Mises (1881–1973), economist, lived at 777 West End Avenue.
- Herman Wouk (1915–2019), novelist, lived at 845 West End Avenue during his college years.

== In popular culture ==
- The Prince of West End Avenue, a novel by Alan Isler, is based on West End Avenue.
- The Mirror Has Two Faces, a film starring and directed by Barbra Streisand, was set in an apartment at 505 West End Avenue.
- "Way Out West (on West End Avenue)", a song by Richard Rodgers and Lorenz Hart introduced in the 1937 musical Babes in Arms, was set along West End Avenue.
- The IAC Building on Eleventh Avenue is featured in the movie The Other Guys, as well as Wall Street: Money Never Sleeps.
- The opening scene in the Will Smith movie Hitch takes place with Smith exiting an 865 West End Avenue apartment building.
- Suzanne Vega's 2007 song "Zephyr and I" features West End Avenue, and spending time with graffiti writer Zephyr.
