= Pomander Walk =

Historic district in Manhattan, New York

Coordinates: 40°47′37″N 73°58′23″W

- U.S. National Register of Historic Places
- U.S. Historic district
- New York State Register of Historic Places
- New York City Landmark
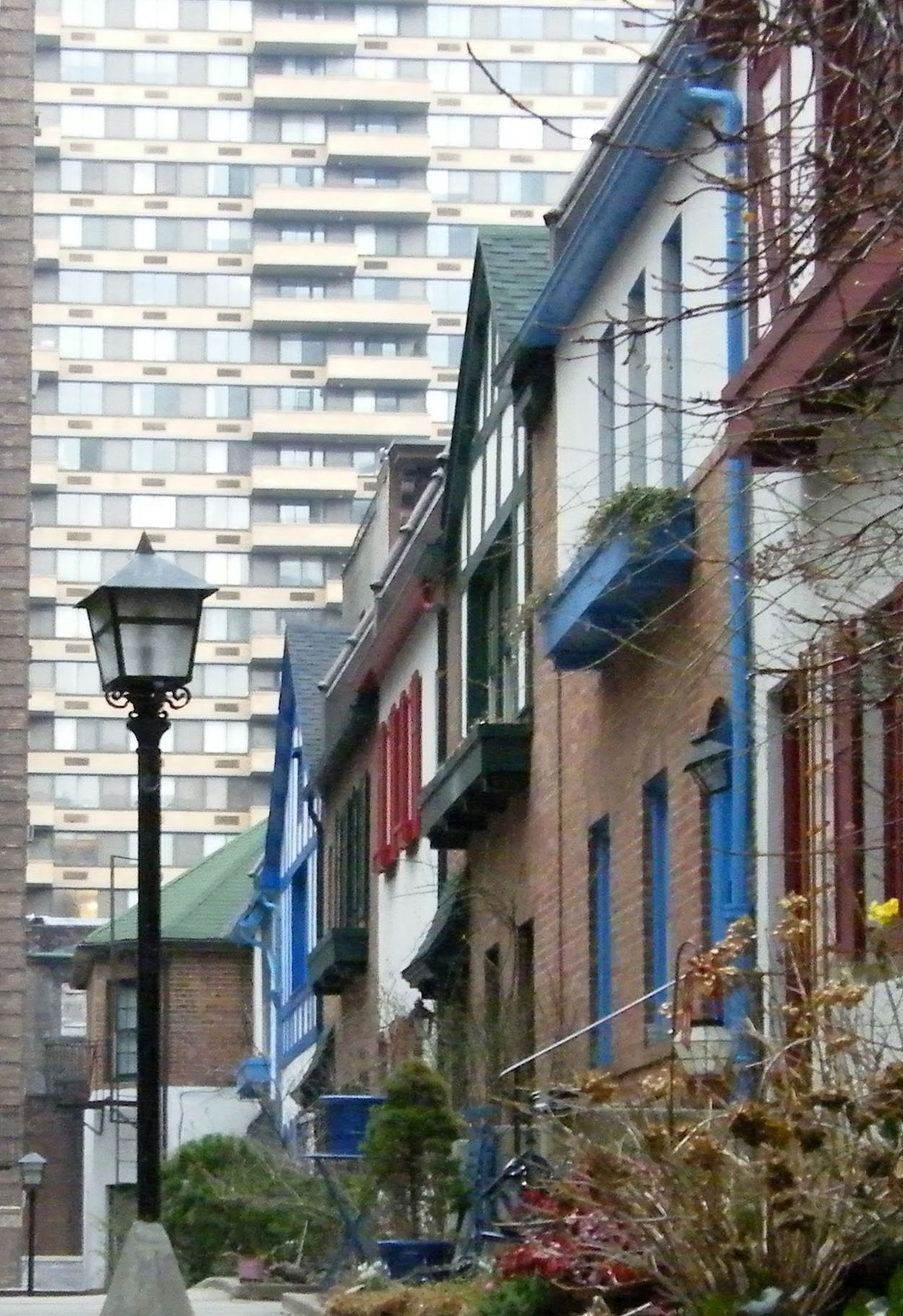
- Pomander Walk, facing north. The Columbia (275 West 96th Street) is visible in the background
- Location: 3–22 Pomander Walk; 261–267 West 94th Street; 260–274 West 95th Street; west of Broadway, Manhattan, New York City, New York
- Built: 1921
- Architect: King and Campbell
- NRHP reference No.: 83001739
- NYSRHP No.: 06101.004559
- NYCL No.: 1279

Significant dates
- Added to NRHP: September 14, 1982
- Designated NYSRHP: August 10, 1983
- Designated NYCL: September 11, 1979

Pomander Walk is a cooperative apartment complex in Manhattan, New York City, located on the Upper West Side between Broadway and West End Avenue. The complex consists of 27 buildings. Four buildings face West 94th Street, and another seven face West 95th Street, including one with a return facade on West End Avenue. The "Walk" itself, consisting of two rows of eight buildings facing each other across a narrow courtyard, runs through the middle of the block between 94th and 95th, with a locked gate at each end. Each building originally had one apartment on each floor. In recent years, some buildings have been reconfigured to serve as single-family homes.

Pomander Walk is different in style and out of scale with the tall buildings that surround it. Author and former resident Darryl Pinckney called it "an insertion of incredible whimsy" into the Upper West Side. It is not open to the public and visit is by invitation only.

== History ==
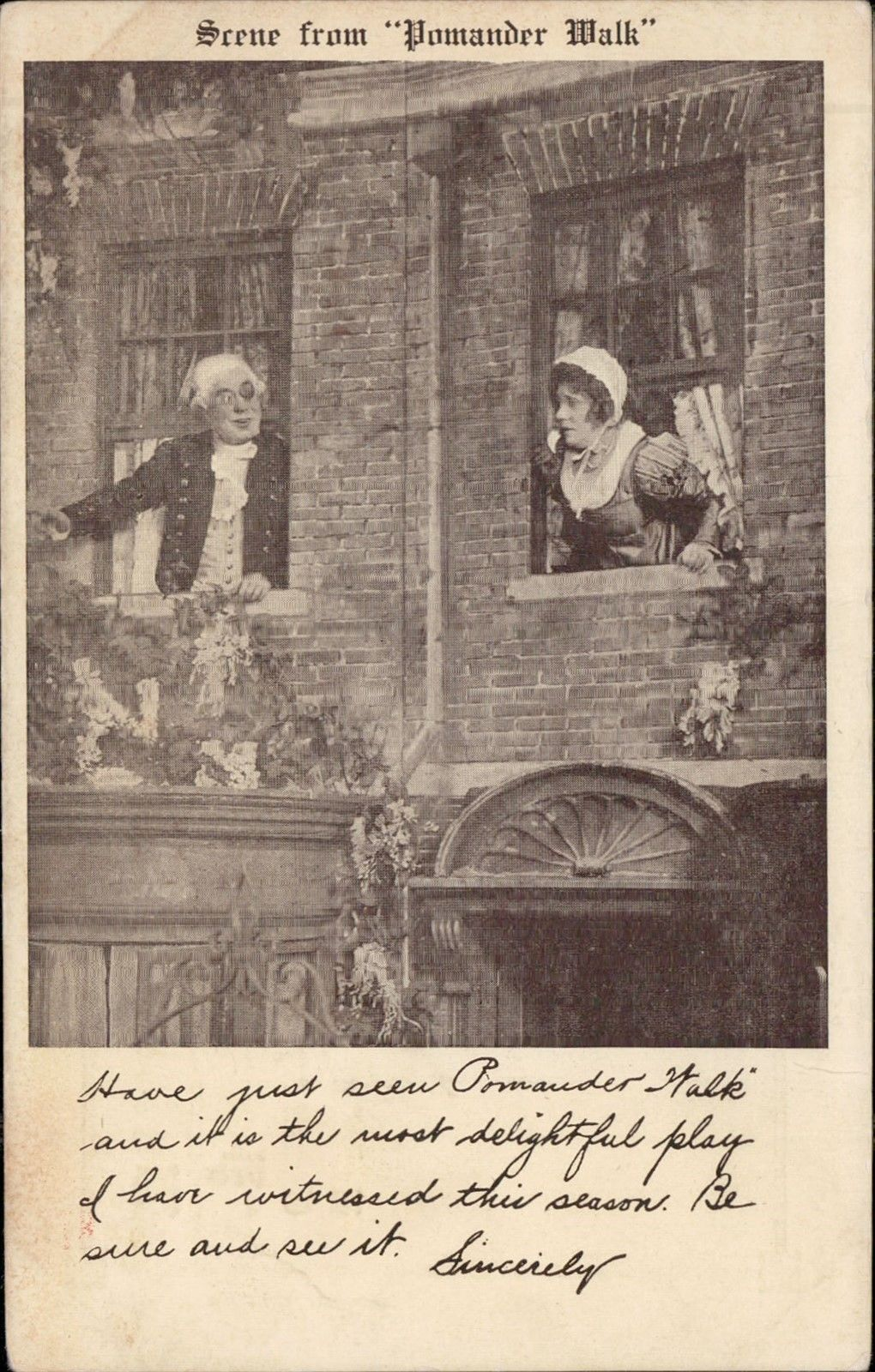
Postcard for the 1910 Broadway production of Pomander Walk

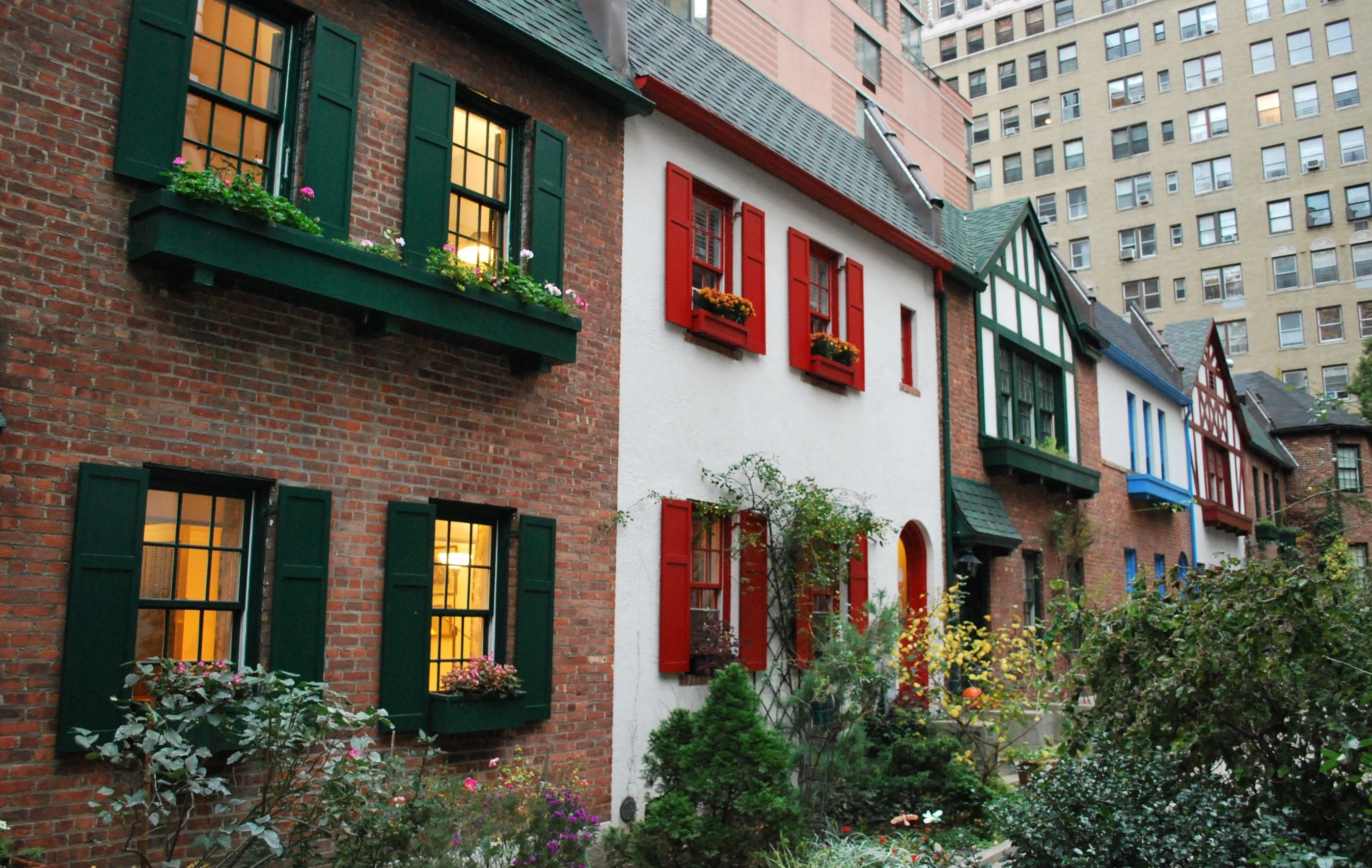
Pomander Walk in 2009

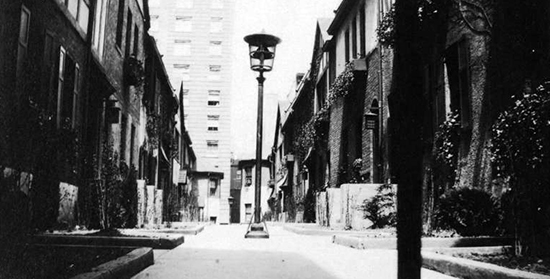
Pomander Walk in the early 1920s, when it was first built.

The complex is named for Pomander Walk, a romantic comedy by Louis N. Parker that opened in New York in 1910. The play is set on an imaginary byway near London. The place as built bears a tenuous resemblance to the setting described in the play as "a retired crescent of five very small, old-fashioned houses near Chiswick, on the river-bank. ... They are exactly alike: miniature copies of Queen Anne mansions".

New York City's Pomander Walk is Tudoresque, a style that enjoyed a vogue in America in the years following World War I. The Walk is not a mews, though often so-called, having no history as a stables. The buildings may fairly be described as Storybook Houses, an architectural trend of the 1920s in England and the United States.

Pomander Walk was built in 1921 by nightclub impresario Thomas J. Healy who planned to build a major hotel on the site. According to historian Christopher Gray, when Healy was unable to get financing for a hotel, he built the houses that stand on the site today, apparently to provide a temporary cash-flow while he waited to raze them and build the hotel. It was designed by the New York architecture firm King and Campbell. Healy died in 1927, however, so Pomander Walk remained.

By the 1970s, the complex was rundown and at risk of being demolished. However, it was saved with city landmark, state landmark, and National Register of Historic Places designations in 1982 after tenants banded together to block redevelopment. An earlier application for City Landmark status had been rejected in 1966.

In 2009 the owners completed a four-year facade renovation, restoring architectural details that had been lost for decades. In 2008 Landmark West! bestowed their Building Rehabilitation Award on Pomander Walk.

Past residents of Pomander Walk include Nancy Carroll, Ward Morehouse, Herbert Stothart, Paulette Goddard, Michael Sorkin and Rosalind Russell.

== In popular culture ==
The protagonist of This Time Tomorrow, a 2022 novel by Emma Straub, grew up living on Pomander Walk.
