= Clarence True =

American architect (1860–1928)

Clarence Fagan True
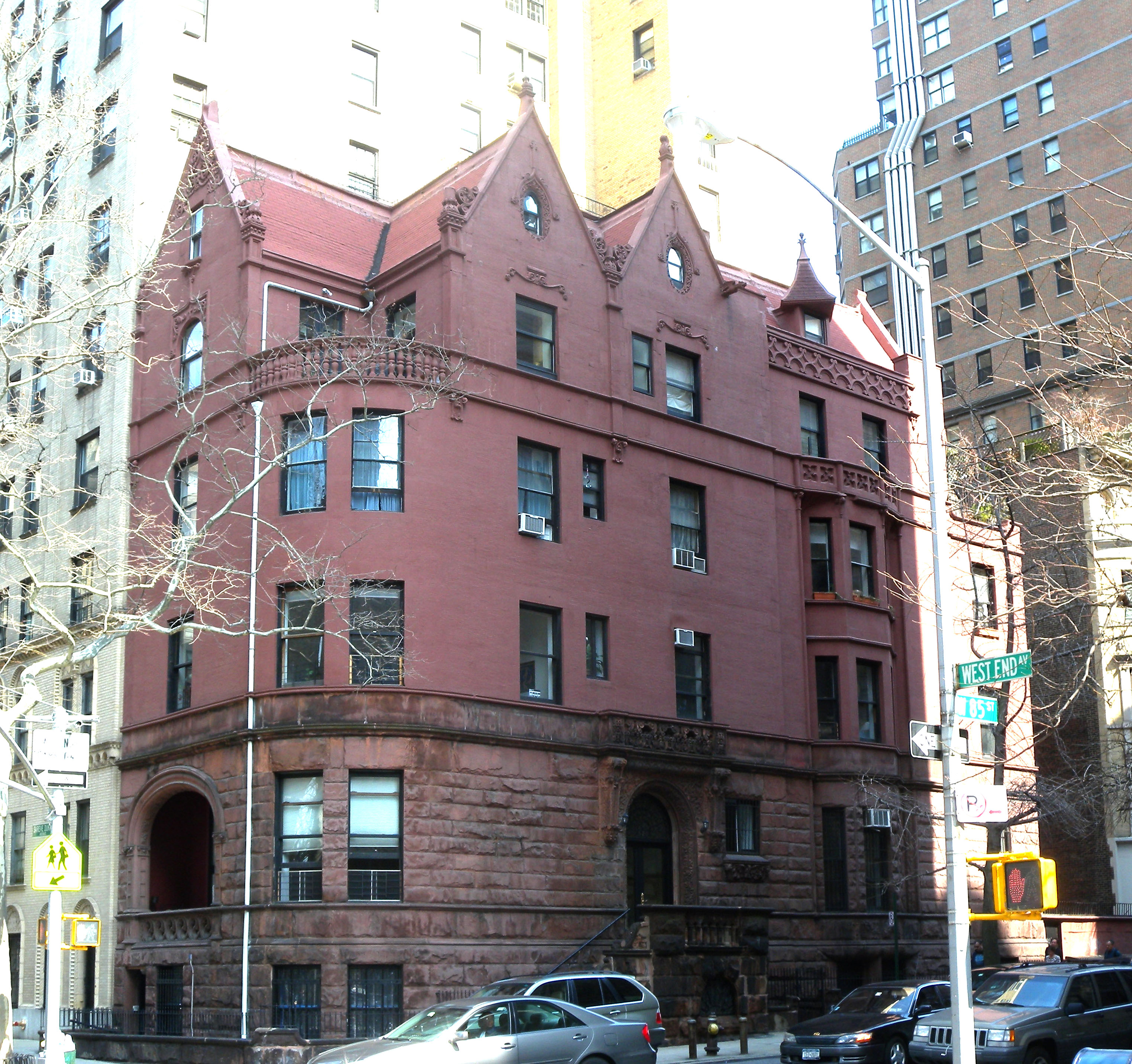
- Leech House, 520 West End Avenue (1892)
- Born: 1860; Queens, New York, US
- Died: 1928; New York City, New York, US
- Occupation: Architect
- Practice: Draftsman in the offices of Richard M. Upjohn (until 1884); Principal of Clarence True (from 1884)
- Buildings: John B. Leech Residence (1892)

Clarence Fagan True, AIA (1860–1928) was an American architect in New York City, one of the most prolific and competent architects to work on the Upper West Side and in Harlem during the last decade of the 19th century and the early part of the 20th century.

== Early life ==
Born 1860, True was the son of an Episcopal clergyman from College Point, Queens. The family moved to Manhattan, and by 1890, True was working in the same office building as developer Charles G. Judson.

== Career ==
True "worked in the office of the Gothicist Richard M. Upjohn until he went out on his own in 1884 with a few minor commissions, like two in Queens: a Queen Anne cottage in Flushing and a Gothic-style clubhouse for the Aerial Athletic Association in Woodside." About 1890 Judson hired True, at that point a newly established architect. The same year, True planned his first row houses on the West Side of New York City. In 1891 he designed buildings at 157 and 159 West 88th Street, the low stoop row houses were each constructed for $12,000 apiece. His development corporation for his speculative buildings was the Riverside Building Company.

William Van Alen, architect of the Chrysler Building, trained in True's office.

== Works ==
- 1892: John B. Leech Residence, 520 West End Avenue
- 316–26 West 85th Street
- 103–109 Riverside Drive
- 163 West 79th Street
- 332 West 83rd Street
- 469-477 West 143rd Street
- 1681-1687 Amsterdam Avenue
- 43–57 St. Nicholas Place
- 842 and 844 St. Nicholas Avenue
