= Susan Freedman =

President of the Public Art Fund

Susan K. Freedman is a leading supporter of contemporary public art in New York City. Since 1986, she has been the President of the Public Art Fund, which was founded by her mother Doris Chanin Freedman in 1977.

Growing up in New York, Freedman attended the Ethical Culture Fieldston School and was in Rabbi Sally Priesand’s first confirmation classes at Stephen Wise Free Synagogue. She graduated from Brown University in 1982 with a B.A. in studio art and American civilization. Freedman was assistant to Mayor Edward I. Koch, and director of special projects and events for the Art Commission of the City of New York from 1983 to 1986. She was formerly a member of the City of New York Department of Cultural Affairs Advisory Commission, a jury member for the Lower Manhattan Development Corporation's World Trade Center Memorial competition, and Mayor Michael Bloomberg's Representative on the Board of Trustees at the Museum of Modern Art. According to David Patrick Columbia′s New York Social Diary, she is “known as a fearless public art crusader.”

Freedman currently serves on the board of the Municipal Art Society, and as vice chair of the board for the City Parks Foundation. Previously she served on the boards of WNYC Radio and the Eldridge Street Project.

Freedman is a recipient of the 1999 Associates of the Art Commission Annual Award and was honoured with the 2005 Municipal Art Society's Evangeline Blashfield Award for her contributions to New York City’s urban landscape.

Freedman is married to Rabbi Richard Jacobs, who became president of the Union for Reform Judaism (URJ) in June 2012, and was formerly the senior rabbi at Westchester Reform Temple in Scarsdale, New York. The couple has three children, and resides in New York.

== Publications ==
- Susan K. Freedman (ed.) (2004). Plop: Recent projects of the Public Art Fund. Merrell Publishers, London in association with Public Art Fund, New York ISBN 1-85894-248-9
- Roxy Paine, Susan K. Freedman, Tom Eccles (2004). Roxy Paine: Bluff. Public Art Fund, New York, N.Y. Whitney Museum of American Art ISBN 0-9608488-1-9
