= M31 and M57 buses =

Bus routes in Manhattan, New York

m31, m57
- 57th Street Crosstown Line
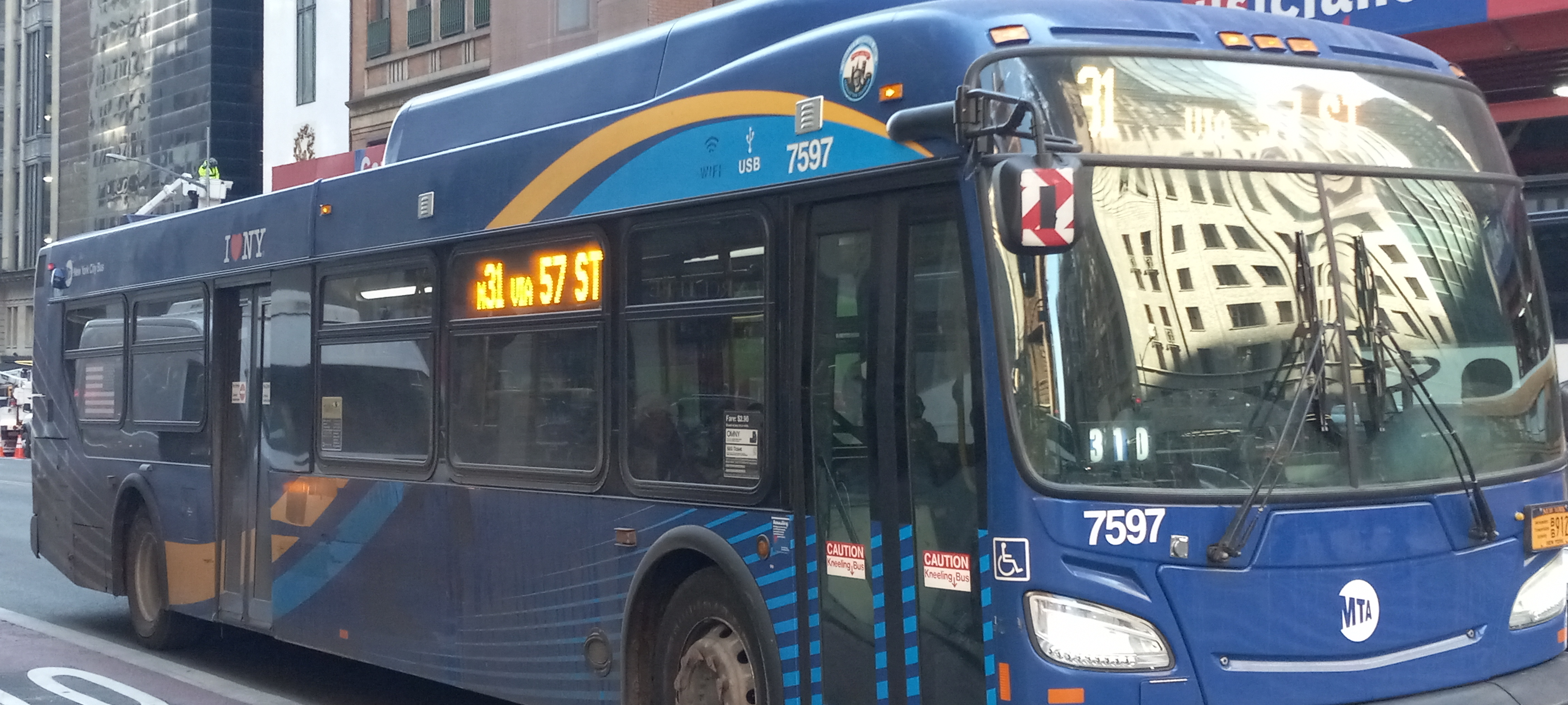
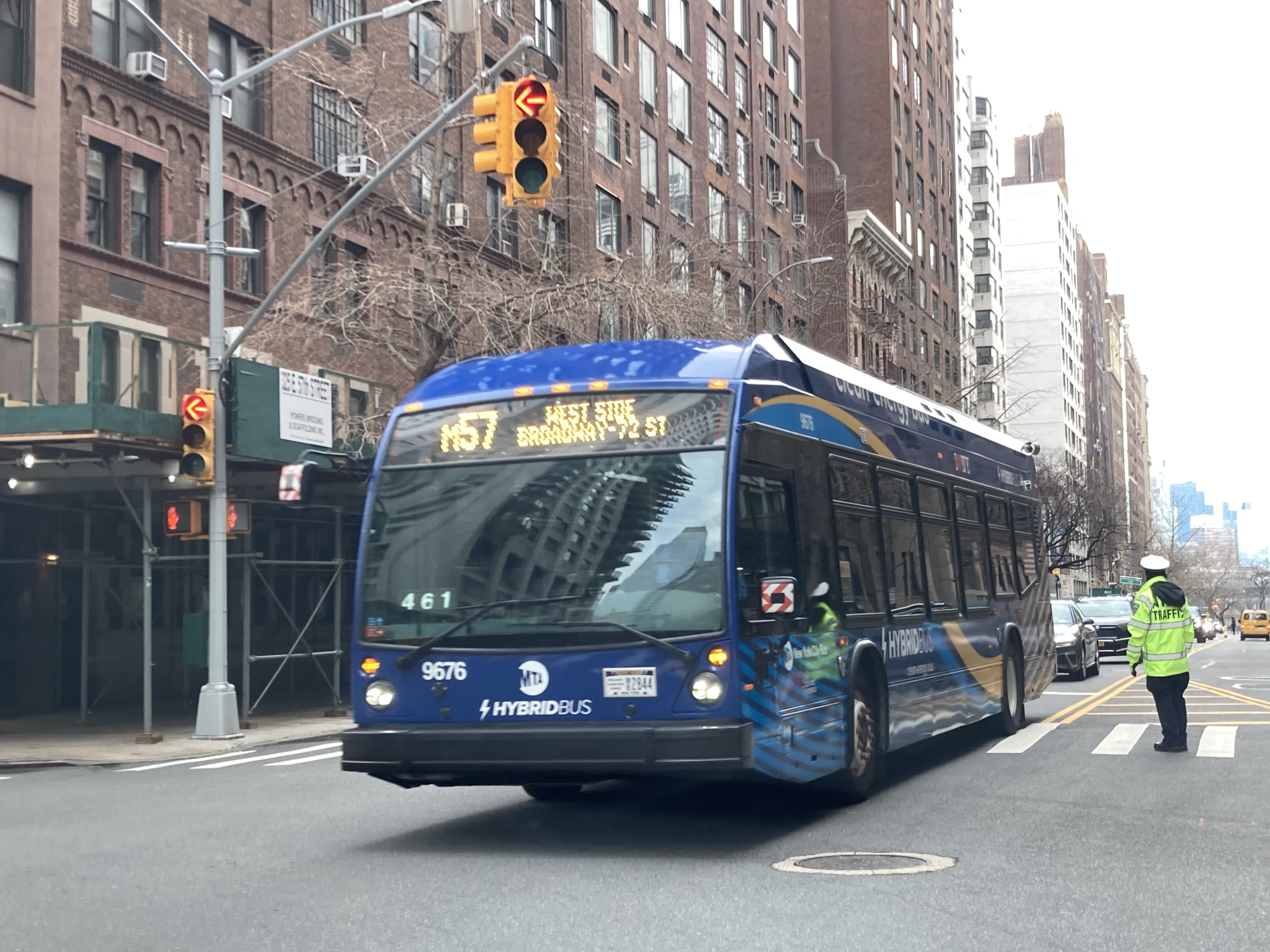
- A 2019 XD40 (7597) on the M31 and a 2021 LFS HEV (9676) on the Upper West Side-bound M57

Overview
- System: MTA Regional Bus Operations
- Operator: Manhattan and Bronx Surface Transit Operating Authority
- Garage: Tuskegee Airmen Depot (M31); Michael J. Quill Depot (M57)
- Vehicle: Nova Bus LFS HEV (both routes); New Flyer Xcelsior XD40; New Flyer Xcelsior XE40 (M57 only); Nova Bus LFS Articulated; New Flyer Xcelsior XD60 (M31 supplemental service)

Route
- Locale: Manhattan, New York, U.S.
- Communities served: Upper West Side, Riverside South, Hell's Kitchen, Midtown, Sutton Place, Upper East Side
- Start: M31: Hell's Kitchen –54th Street and 11th Avenue; M57: Upper West Side –72nd Street and Amsterdam Avenue
- Via: 57th Street; M31: York Avenue; M57: West End Avenue
- End: M31: Upper East Side –1st Avenue and 92nd Street; M57: Sutton Place –1st Avenue and 55th Street
- Length: 2.7 miles (4.3 km) (eastbound M57); 3.0 miles (4.8 km) (westbound M57); 3.8 miles (6.1 km) (M31)

Service
- Operates: M31: 5 a.m. (7 a.m. weekends) to 12:30 a.m. M57: 5 a.m. (6:30 a.m. weekends) to 12:30 a.m.
- Ridership: M31: 2,585,352 (2025); M57: 1,811,612 (2025)
- Transfers: Yes
- Timetable: M31 M57

The M31 and M57 bus routes constitute the 57th Street Crosstown Line, a public transit line in Manhattan, New York City, running primarily along 57th Street. The M31 runs between 11th Avenue and 54th Street in Hell's Kitchen to 1st Avenue and 92nd Street in Yorkville. The M57 runs from 72nd Street and Amsterdam Avenue on the Upper West Side to Sutton Place and 57th Street in Sutton Place.

The M31 and M57 are legally operated by the Manhattan and Bronx Surface Transit Operating Authority, a wholly owned subsidiary of New York City Transit, whose bus routes were consolidated into MTA Regional Bus Operations.

== Route description and service ==
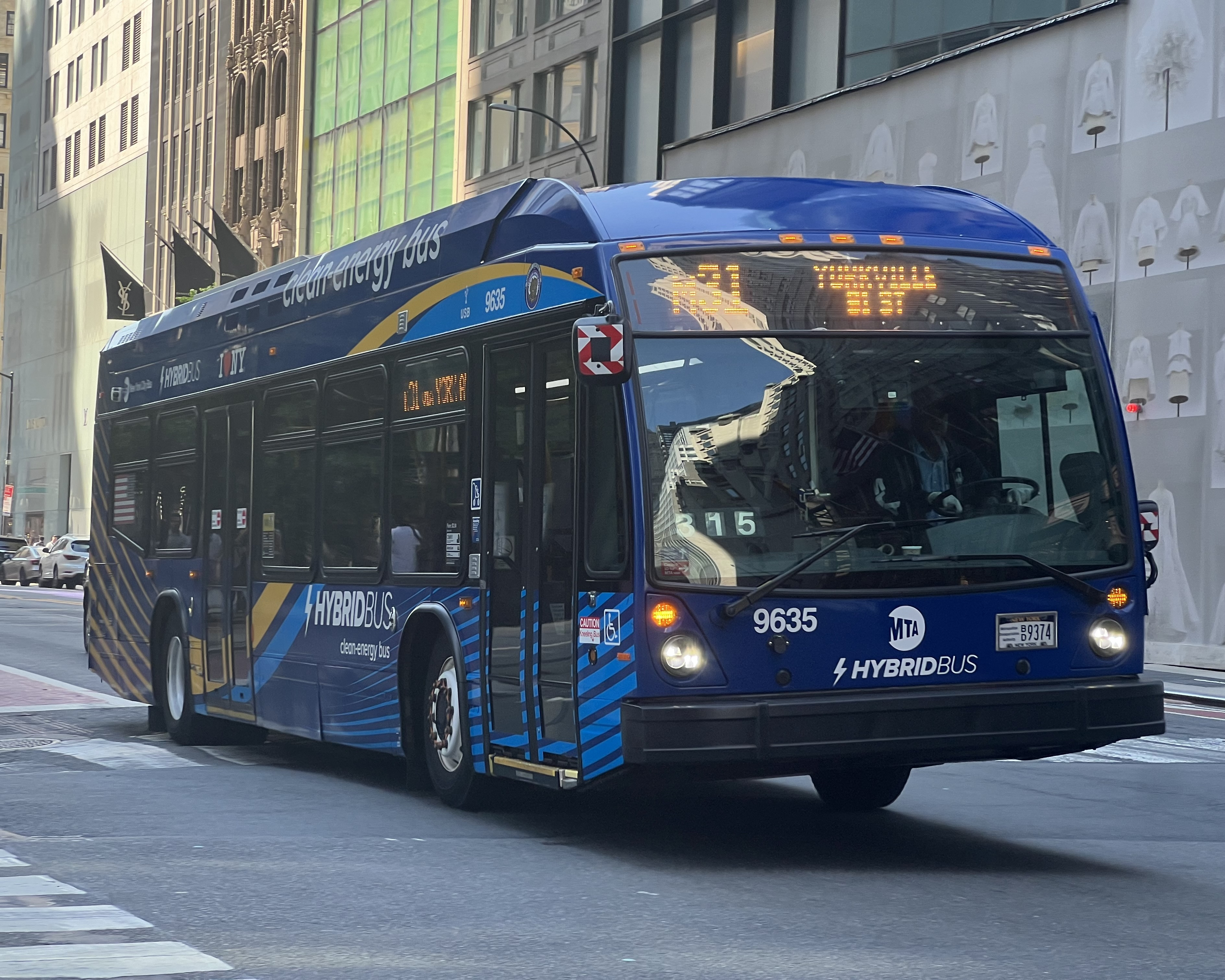
A 2021 NovaBus LFS HEV (9635) on the Yorkville-bound M31 in June 2024

For most of its length, the M31 uses 57th Street to travel crosstown, then uses York Avenue to travel uptown to 92nd Street and First Avenue. At its western end, the M31 turns left on Eleventh Avenue, then left on 54th Street to terminate; eastbound buses return to 57th Street using Tenth Avenue. At its northern/eastern end, the M31 goes left on 91st Street then right on First Avenue, terminating along 92nd Street before returning southbound on York Avenue. During morning rush hours, one articulated bus runs on the M31.

The M57 mostly duplicates the M31 along 57th Street. The only major difference is that the M57 uses West End Avenue to reach its western terminus at 72nd Street and Amsterdam Avenue. At its eastern end, the M57 reaches First Avenue, eastbound buses turn on 1st, then terminate. Westbound buses then use Sutton Place, 55th Street, and First Avenue to access 57th Street, where they turn back crosstown.

The M57 operates out of Michael J. Quill Depot whereas the M31 operates out of the Tuskegee Airmen Depot.

== History ==
=== M31 ===
East Side Omnibus Corporation began operating bus route (M11) on June 25, 1933.

The route was renumbered as the M31 on July 1, 1974, as part of the renumbering of bus routes in Manhattan.

=== M57 ===
Buses were introduced on April 17, 1934. Service formerly went between Columbus Circle and Sutton Place. Fifth Avenue Coach Company began operating bus #20 on March 15, 1937, from Sutton Place to 12th Avenue to provide river-to-river service for Sutton Place residents at five-minute headways.

The route, formerly numbered M20, became M28 on July 1, 1974, as part of the renumbering of bus routes in Manhattan.

On September 10, 1989, the M28 (57th Street Crosstown) and M103 (59th/60th Street Crosstown) routes were merged to form the M57. M57 buses began operating from 57th Street and Sutton Place South to Broadway and 72nd Street, running via 57th Street and West End Avenue.
