= 520 West End Avenue =

Mansion in Manhattan, New York

Coordinates: 40°47′17.5″N 73°58′40.7″W

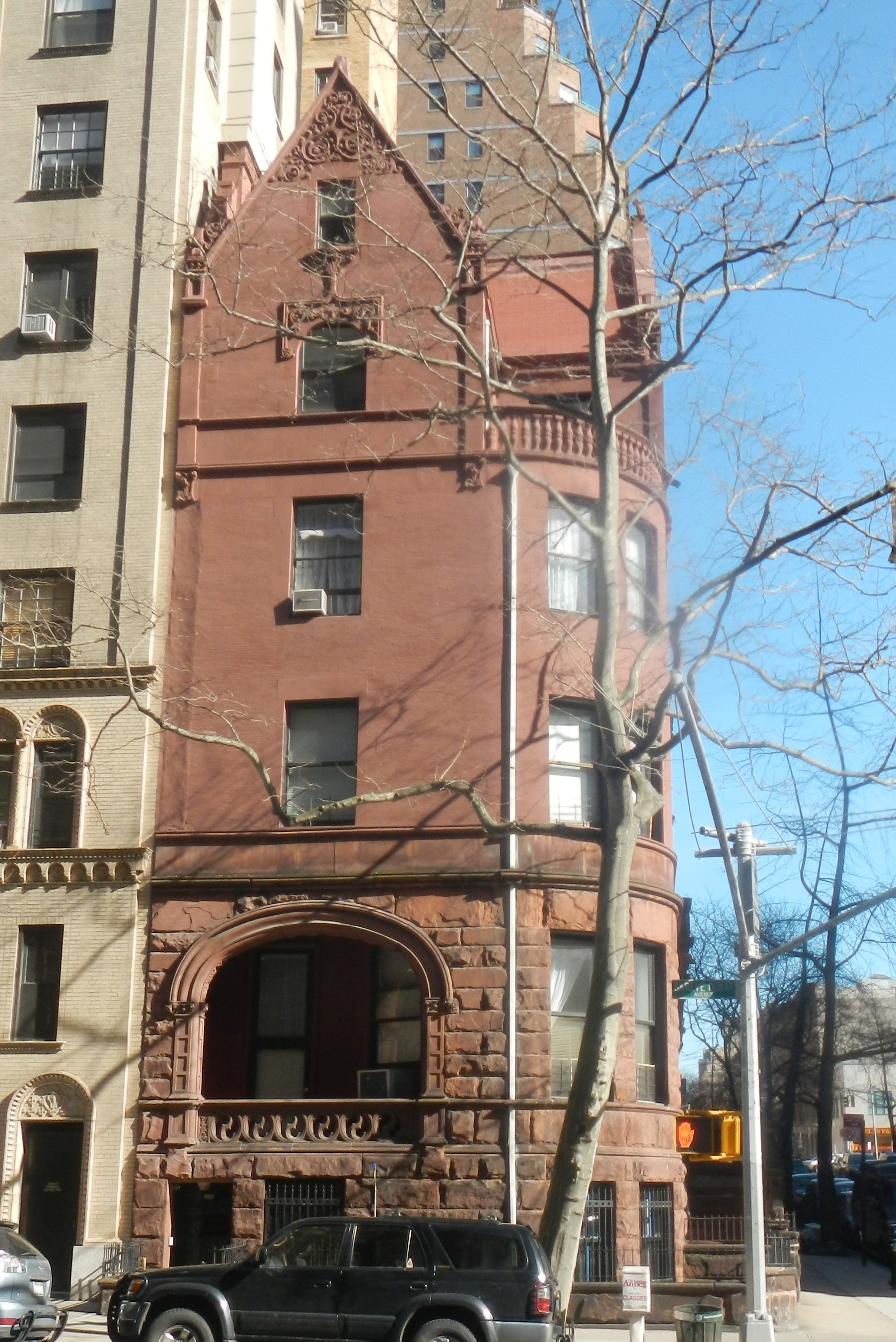
West facade

520 West End Avenue, also known as the John B. and Isabella Leech Residence, is a landmarked mansion on the northeast corner of West End Avenue and 85th Street, on the Upper West Side of Manhattan.

The house, built as a single-family residence, was built in 1892 as the residence of Isabella and John B. Leech. Leech was a prosperous cotton broker. The architect was Clarence F. True. At the time the Leech residence was built, West End Avenue was lined with homes belonging to prosperous families.

520 West End Avenue is a Romanesque Revival building, built of blocks of rusticated limestone on the first two floors with tan-colored Roman brick above. The detailing draws on Gothic Revival and Elizabethan Revival styles. Built on a corner lot, it was one of the largest homes on a street of townhouses. For a time it housed the Gordon-Winston School. It is now an apartment building.

The house was declared a New York City landmark in 1987.

== See also ==
- List of New York City Designated Landmarks in Manhattan from 59th to 110th Streets
