= Semiha =

Given name

Semiha is a Turkish female given name and may refer to:

== Given name ==
- Semiha Berksoy (1910–2004), Turkish opera singer
- Semiha Borovac (born 1955), former mayor of Sarajevo
- Semiha Es (1912– 2012), the first Turkish female war photographer
- Semiha Mutlu (born 1987), a Turkish racewalker
- Semiha Yankı (born 1958), Turkish pop music singer, presenter and film actress

== See also ==
- Semikhah
