= Lincoln Towers =

Apartment complex in Manhattan, New York

Coordinates: 40.777°N 73.987°W

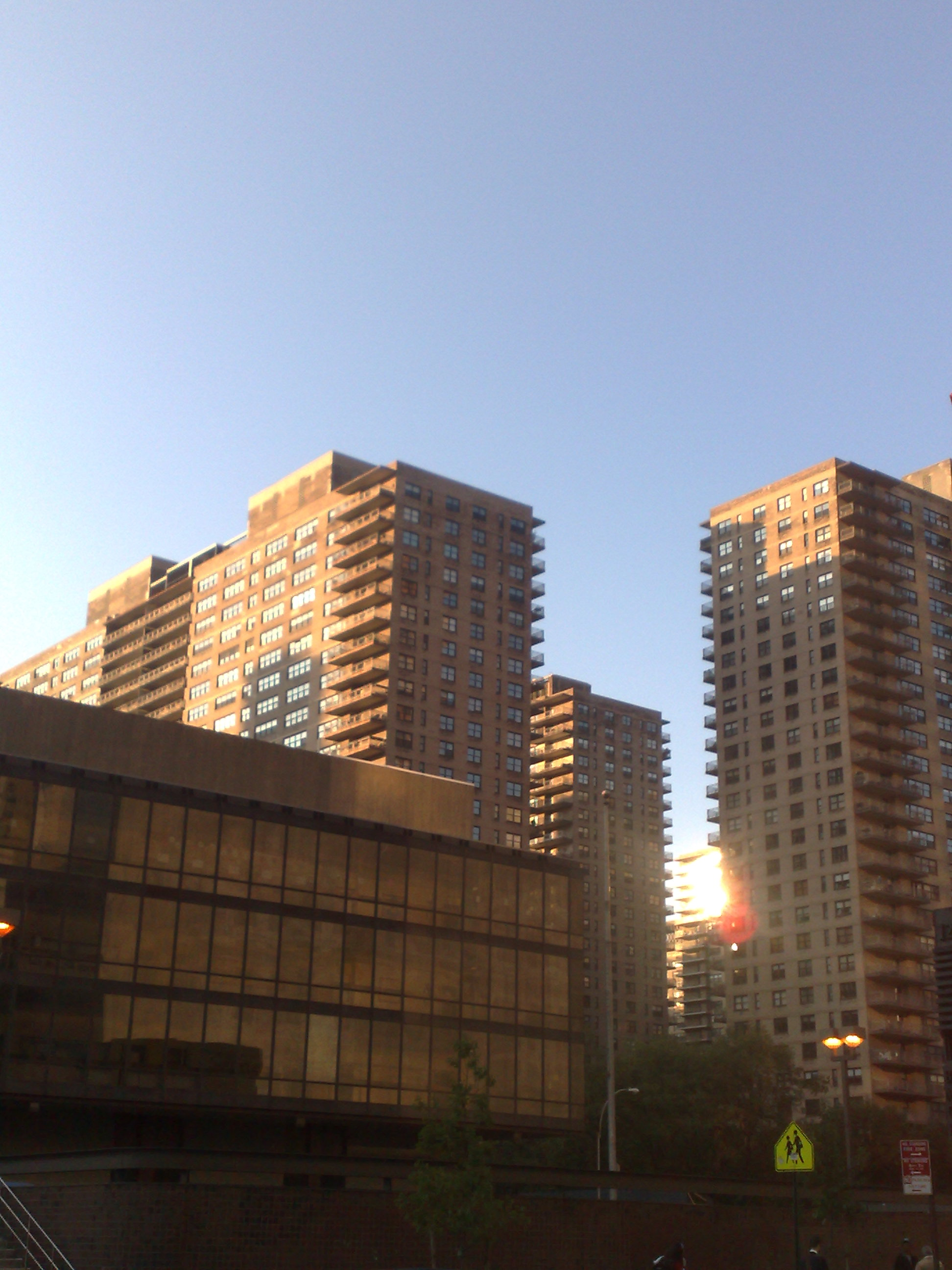
Lincoln Towers in 2008.

Lincoln Towers is an apartment complex on the Upper West Side of Manhattan in New York City, United States. It consists of six buildings with eight addresses on a 20-acre (81,000 m^{2}) lot.

== Location and description ==
It is bounded on the south by West 66th Street, on the west by Freedom Place, on the north by West 70th Street, and on the east by Amsterdam Avenue. Each building has a West End Avenue address, although one of the Lincoln Towers buildings has its entrance on West 66th Street, another on West 70th Street, and another is closer to Amsterdam Avenue than West End Avenue. Some buildings have 28 floors and some have 29 floors and between 15 and 20 apartments per floor. Lincoln Towers houses so many people that some buildings are their own polling place. The ground floor of each building is primarily occupied by professional offices and other small businesses; the upper floors are residential.

== Features ==
Within Lincoln Towers there is an outreach program, "Project Open," that supports the elderly with assistance from social workers, shopping services, art classes and educational trips. The private parks, schools, the general appeal of the Upper West Side and proximity of the buildings to Lincoln Center have made the complex desirable to families ranging from singles and young families to empty nesters and retirees. The complex houses a large private outdoor space on the far west side of the property containing a floor hockey court, basketball courts, two playgrounds, and green grass for its tenants. There are other large park-like expanses between and behind the buildings on the east side of West End Avenue.

== History ==
Lincoln Towers was developed as part of a redevelopment plan for the Upper West Side of Manhattan, started in the mid-1950s by Robert Moses as part of his Lincoln Square Renewal Project. The area north and west of the proposed Lincoln Center cultural site, then part of the densely populated San Juan Hill neighborhood, was designated as blighted with plans for replacement by a group of towers in the park, a model of development pioneered and promoted by architect Le Corbusier. Researchers at Columbia University completed an architectural history of the Lincoln Square redevelopment project.

While architect I. M. Pei had proposed a mix of towers and lower-rise residences in 1957 at the start of the project, the costs of construction and the need to efficiently finance the developments led designers to a more utilitarian and economical plan, with six standardized 28-story buildings that would accommodate a total of 3,800 apartments. Built on a 20-acre (8.1 ha) superblock site, the design would eliminate the connection with the remainder of the Manhattan street grid. The costs associated with developing the Kips Bay Towers on the Upper East Side, led to a decision to build Lincoln Towers in a more stripped down form with fewer amenities, leading William Zeckendorf to say "when these towers are torn down, no one will mourn their passing."

In 1984, the John D. and Catherine T. MacArthur Foundation announced that they would put their property up for sales, with the expectation that the complex would be converted to individual ownership of the units. The development was converted from rental apartments to a complex condominium/co-op structure in 1987, with half of tenants buying their units. The unpurchased units retained their status as rent stabilized, with most of those units eventually being sold to purchasers. The units were sold to existing apartment tenants at prices under half of the market value, with as many as 10% of purchasers flipping the units for substantial profits shortly after the condo conversion was completed, averaging $100,000 per unit.

Each building is an independent condominium comprising the residences, the professional units, and the underground garage. The residential portion of each building is, in turn, a co-op. Each of the buildings, comprising eight addresses, is a member of the Lincoln Towers Community Association, an umbrella organization responsible for the maintenance of the grounds and provision of security on the large, parklike campus.
