= 100 Eleventh Avenue =

Residential tower in Manhattan, New York

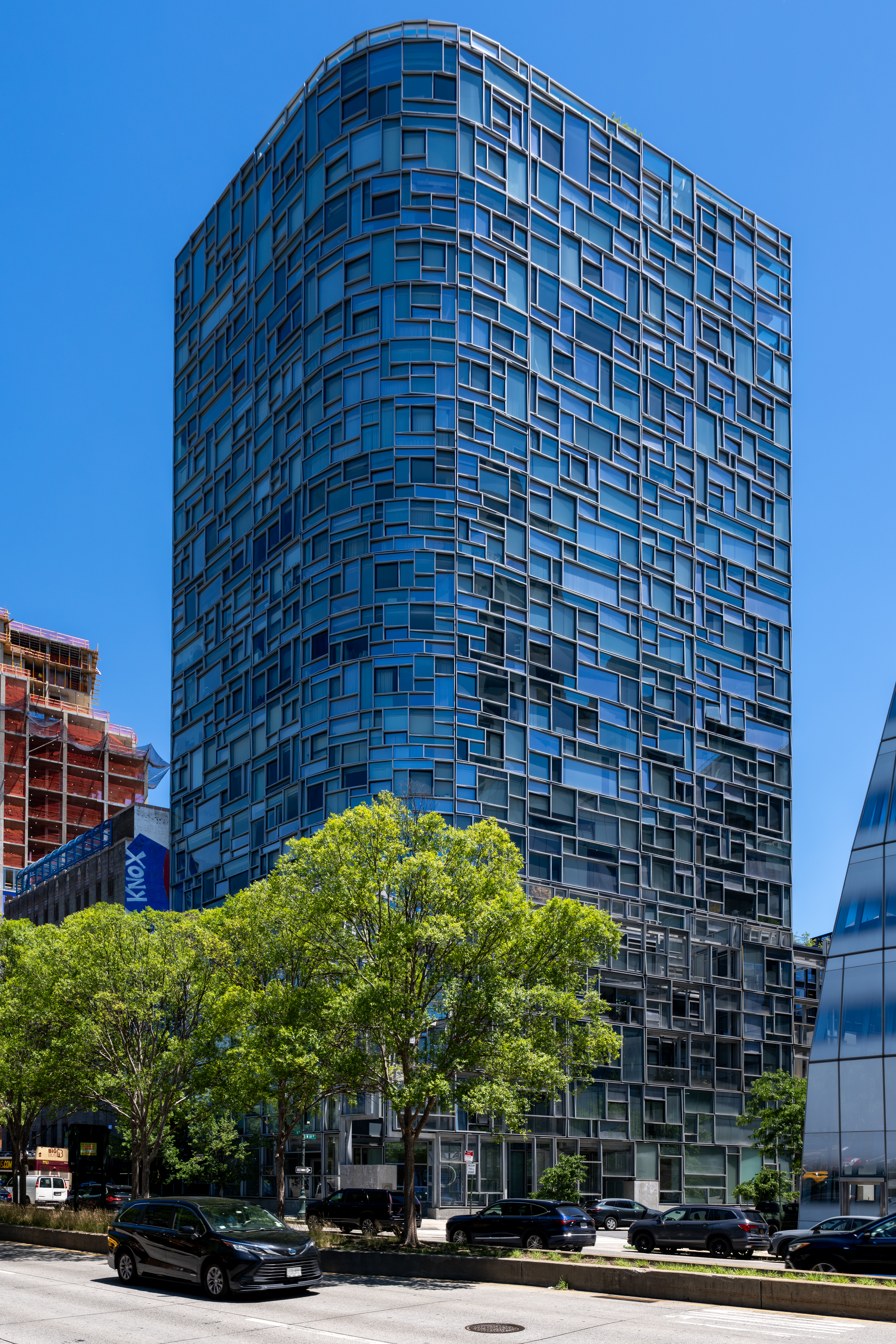
- 100 Eleventh Avenue seen from Eleventh Avenue (2026)
- Interactive map of the 100 Eleventh Avenue area

General information
- Status: Completed
- Type: Residential
- Location: 100 Eleventh Avenue, Chelsea, Manhattan, New York City, New York, United States
- Coordinates: 40°44′46″N 74°0′28″W
- Construction started: 2007
- Completed: 2010

Technical details
- Floor count: 21
- Lifts/elevators: 8

Design and construction
- Architect: Jean Nouvel
- Architecture firm: Beyer Blinder Belle
- Structural engineer: DeSimone Consulting Engineers

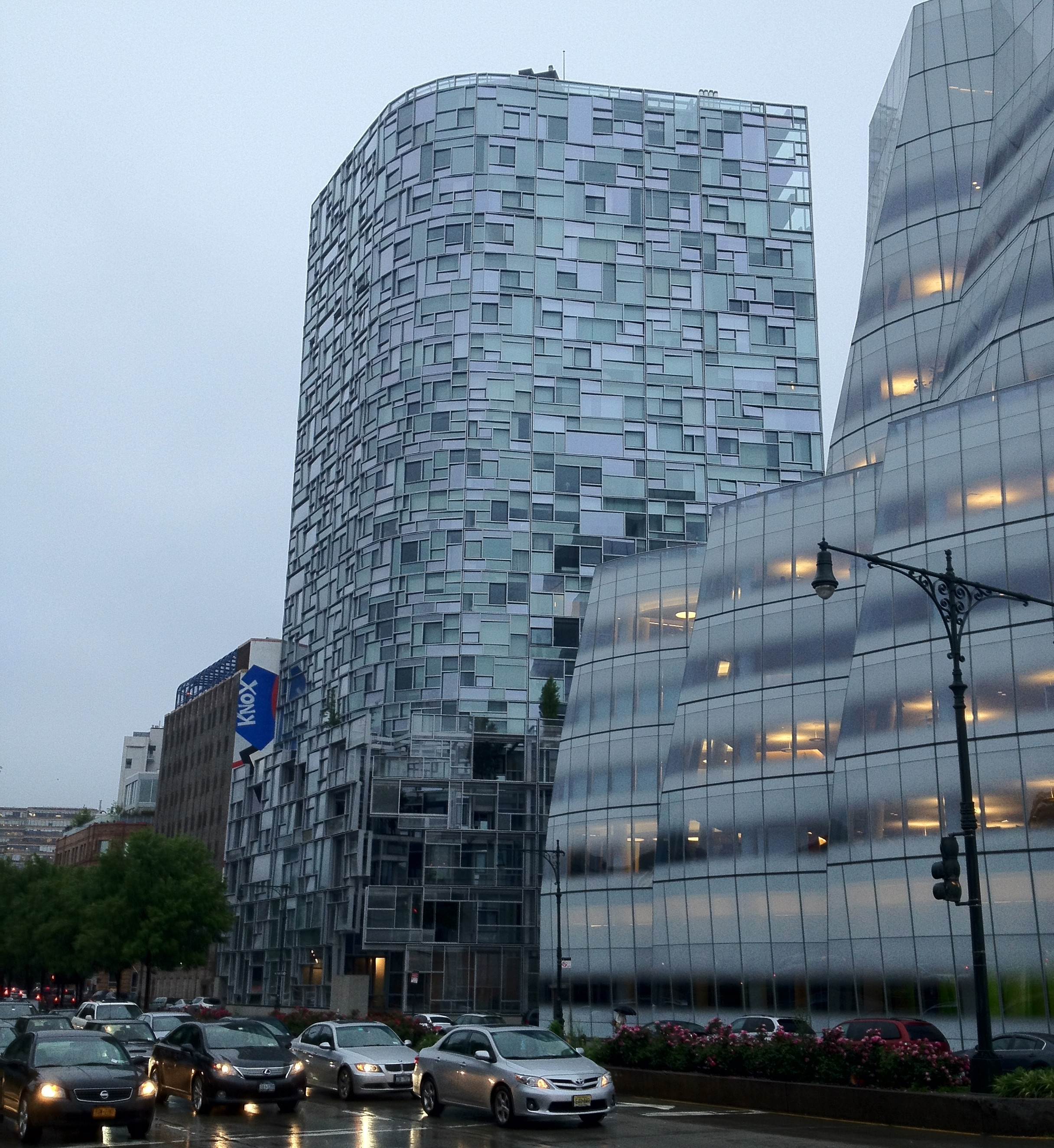
View along 11th Avenue

100 Eleventh Avenue is a 23-story residential tower at the intersection of 19th Street and Eleventh Avenue (the West Side Highway) in the borough of Manhattan in New York City, New York, United States. Designed by French architect Jean Nouvel has described the building as "a vision machine". It has one of the most technologically advanced curtain wall systems in New York City, but also refers to West Chelsea masonry industrial architectural traditions.

== Design and construction ==
The developers of 100 11th Avenue were Craig Wood and Curtis Bashaw, who commissioned French architect Jean Nouvel (Ateliers Jean Nouvel), in conjunction with Beyer Blinder Belle Architects as executive architects. It is described as a conceptual descendant of Nouvel's Arab World Institute in Paris. Nouvel's complex design was site-specific, with Nouvel saying "I can't imagine transporting it somewhere else, even to another location in the center of Manhattan."

By 2008, the project was behind schedule and $50 million over budget. Ground conditions delayed the project by ten months and added $6 million to the concrete budget. Despite these problems, the interest from financial investors remained buoyant, offsetting the increased costs.

The building was completed in 2010. DeSimone Consulting Engineers was the structural engineering firm for the project.

The facade system consists of unitized modules, the largest of which measures 12 by 37 feet (3.7 by 11.3 m). The stainless steel frames contain 32 different window sizes, with each window angled between 2 degrees and 5 degrees up, down, left, or right.

== Description and context ==
The building is located on the far west side of Manhattan at the intersection of 19th Street and West Side Highway. Across the street is Frank Gehry's IAC Building, made of billowing glass. Abutting it is Bayview Correctional Facility, made of brick. The site is centered in the wealthy and culturally diverse neighborhood of Chelsea. Many shops, restaurants, and galleries surround it, including Chelsea Market, the Meatpacking District, the Whitney Museum of American Art, Hudson Yards, and Google. The building is adjacent to Chelsea Piers, Little Island, and the Hudson River Park. Apartments facing west have views of the Hudson River, and those facing east have views of the High Line and the New York City skyline.

The condominium tower is 23 stories and 130,000 square feet (12,000 m^{2}). It contains 72 units made up of one, two, and three-bedroom apartments. There are five penthouses, and a single-floor unit on the top floor. On the lower levels are a spa, gym, 70-foot indoor/outdoor heated pool, bike room, and garden. The ground floor also has a restaurant with a dining patio.

The building's form is designed to take full advantage of the site. The tower mass is formed along a curve that runs the entire site. The curved form allows all apartments to have street frontage and views. It also gives each apartment light and views southwest. On the lower seven stories, Nouvel connects to the street, a freestanding curtain wall 15 feet away from the south façade and follows along the sidewalk. Behind the freestanding structure is a semi-enclosed atrium called "The Loggia". Within the atrium are fully-grown trees that seem to float in midair. There are two different types of façade. On the south and west side, Nouvel designed a pixilated curtain wall that was inspired by the compound eye of an insect. This harnesses the site's light and reflects it back to the city. The curtain wall has 1,647 different windowpanes that are connected to "megapanels". The megapanels are tilted at different angles, resulting in different levels of transparency throughout the curtain wall. The north and east facades are clad with black brick. It has punch windows of many different sizes and set at different angles that frame views of the skyline.

100 11th Avenue is a LEED certified building, with features such as low-emission, recycled materials, and natural ventilation.

== Sources ==
1. Fishbein, Jennifer. “Jean Nouvel’s Moment in the Sun” Businessweek.com, (April 17, 2008), (accessed February 8, 2012)
2. Freedlander, David. “Jean Nouvel’s ‘Vision’ Rising in Chelsea” The New York Sun (April 5, 2007) (accessed February 8, 2012)
3. Ouroussoff, Nicolai (March 14, 2010). "Luxury Tower at Corner of Grit and Glamour in Chelsea". The New York Times.
4. Ouroussoff, Nicolai (April 2, 2007). "Jean Nouvel - Architecture - Column". The New York Times.
5. Russell S, James. “Nouvel’s $150 Million Window Waterfall Shakes Up Condo Design” Bloomberg.com (April 16, 2007), (accessed February 8, 2012)
6. Schwan, Andrea "Construction Begins On Architect Jean Nouvel's Vision Machine Along Manhattan's West Side" nouvelchelsea.com
7. Wolffe, Danielle. "European starchitects reach for the skyline" Real Estate Weekly Vol. 53, (April 4, 2007)
