= Doris Freedman =

American arts administrator

Doris Chanin Freedman
- Born: 1928
- Died: 1981 (aged 52–53)
- Occupations: Arts activist and administrator

Doris Chanin Freedman (1928–1981) was a pioneer in the field of public art, active in New York City. She was the daughter of architect Irwin Salmon Chanin and his wife Sylvia Schofler.

Freedman graduated from Albright College, Pennsylvania in 1950, where she would later help fund the creation of the school's art gallery. Founded in 1975, Freedman Gallery's primary aim is to represent living American contemporary artists. Freedman also received a master's degree in social work from Columbia University.

From 1971 to 1980 Freedman was the president of City Walls Inc., a not-for-profit organization, established in 1969 which worked with artists and communities to revitalize New York City through public art and had sponsored more than fifty murals. In 1971, she founded the Public Arts Council; “both organizations provided technical assistance and financial support for a wide variety of projects, and developed programs to explore the potential of urban public spaces”. In 1977 she founded the Public Art Fund of the City of New York by merging City Walls and the Public Arts Council.

Freedman served as New York City's first Director of Cultural Affairs during the Lindsay Administration, and as President of the Municipal Art Society. Greatly through her efforts New York City introduced Percent for Art legislation in 1982, which requires civil construction projects to spend a portion of their budgets on art. Freedman also hosted the radio show Artists in the City on WNYC.

The southeast entrance of Central Park in Manhattan, located on Grand Army Plaza at 60th Street and Fifth Avenue, was dedicated to Freedman by Mayor Edward I. Koch in 1981.The Doris C. Freedman Plaza in her honor. It is the site of rotating sculptural art installations presented by the Public Art Fund.

In 1982 the Doris C. Freedman Award, dedicated to her memory was established by Executive Order by Mayor Koch. The Award honors “an individual or organization for a contribution to the people of the City of New York that greatly enriches the public environment”.

Her daughter Susan K. Freedman is currently president of the Public Art Fund.

== See also ==
- Public art
- Culture of New York City
- Venus (mural)
