= Public Art Fund =

Non-profit arts organization in the USA

Public Art Fund is an independent, non-profit arts organization founded in 1977 by Doris C. Freedman. The organization presents contemporary art in New York City's public spaces through a series of highly visible artists' projects, new commissions, installations, and exhibitions that are emblematic of the organization's mission and innovative history.

== History ==
Public Art Fund was founded in 1977 by Doris C. Freedman who served as the first Director of New York City's Department of Cultural Affairs, the President of the Municipal Art Society, and a tireless supporter of New York City's Percent for Art legislation. Public Art Fund was born from the merger of two preexisting organizations, CityWalls, which was founded in 1966, and the Public Arts Council, founded in 1971. Working with artists and museums, Public Art Fund works to bring artwork outside of traditional spaces and into the public sphere. Since its inception, Public Art Fund has presented more than 500 artists' exhibitions and projects at sites throughout New York City's five boroughs as varied as streets, plazas, parks, buses, billboards, and even major landmarks including Times Square, Rockefeller Center, the Brooklyn Bridge Park, Columbus Circle, and Lincoln Center. Susan K. Freedman has served as president since 1986. Nicholas Baume joined Public Art Fund as Director and Chief Curator in 2009, and Elizabeth Fearon Pepperman was elected chair of the Board of Directors in 2020.

== Public Programs ==
In addition to presenting works of art, Public Art Fund also hosts additional programs including Public Art Fund Talks. This series encompasses discussions and presentations from today's most influential artists. Another program, In the Public Realm, is an open call which allows emerging artist to conceive and develop innovative ideas for public works. Public Art Fund also releases a semi annual magazine and exhibition catalog which provides its audience with a summary of the organization's activities and achievements.

== Highlighted Public Projects in New York City ==
Public Art Fund has collaborated with many New York City institutions, including the Whitney Museum of American Art for the Whitney Biennial, Outdoors in Central Park(2002, 2004), and the Museum of Modern Art for Francis Alÿs’ The Modern Procession (2002).

Early exhibition highlights include Agnes Denes’ Wheatfields for Manhattan (1982), David Hammons’ Higher Goals (1986), and Messages to the Public (1982–1990), a series of projects created for Times Square's Spectacolor board that featured work by over 70 artists including Jenny Holzer, Keith Haring, Barbara Kruger, Vito Acconci, Lynne Tillman, Alfredo Jaar, Richard Prince, and the Guerilla Girls.

In the late 1980s and into the 1990s, the organization commissioned socially conscious pieces such as Felix Gonzalez-Torres’ “Untitled” billboard (1989), Gran Fury's “Women don't get AIDS…they just die from it” poster (1991), Guerilla Girls’ billboard project for Public Art Fund's PSA: Public Service Art exhibition series (1991), and Barbara Kruger's Bus (1997).

In 1997, Public Art Fund organized Ilya Kabakov's Monument to the Lost Glove, a giant glove made of red plastic resin, which was bolted to the traffic triangle where Fifth Avenue and Broadway cross at 23rd Street, and worked with him again in 2000 with The Palace of Projects, which was shown at the 69th Regiment Armory.

Other New York City projects included Nancy Rubins' Big Pleasure Point (2006) at Lincoln Center; Corner Plot (2006) by Sarah Sze at the Doris C. Freedman Plaza; Alexander Calder in New York at the City Hall Park (2006); and Material World (2005) at the MetroTech Commons on Downtown Brooklyn, which featured new commissions by Rachel Foullon, Corin Hewitt, Matthew Day Jackson, Peter Kreider, and Mamiko Otsubo.

Public Art Fund moved into a new territory when it announced it would present 2001 Turner Prize winner Martin Creed's performance art piece, Variety Show, on March 30, 2007 at the Abrons Arts Center on the Lower East Side of Manhattan.

Recent exhibition highlights include Olafur Eliasson's The New York City Waterfalls (2008), which created man-made waterfalls at four sites on New York City's waterfront; Rob Pruitt's The Andy Monument, a tribute to Andy Warhol at Union Square (2011),Tatzu Nishi's Discovering Columbus (2012), which reimagined the 13-foot-tall statue of Columbus standing in a fully furnished, modern living room; and Jeppe Hein's Please Touch the Art (2015) at Brooklyn Bridge Park.

In 2017, Public Art Fund celebrated its 40th anniversary with the citywide group exhibition Commercial Break, Liz Glynn's Open House at Doris C. Freedman Plaza, Anish Kapoor's Descension at Brooklyn Bridge Park, and Ai Weiwei's Good Fences Make Good Neighbors.

== See also ==
- Public art
- Plop art
- Culture of New York City
- Doris C. Freedman
- Susan K. Freedman
