= One Riverside Park =

Residential skyscraper in Manhattan, New York

- 50 Riverside Boulevard
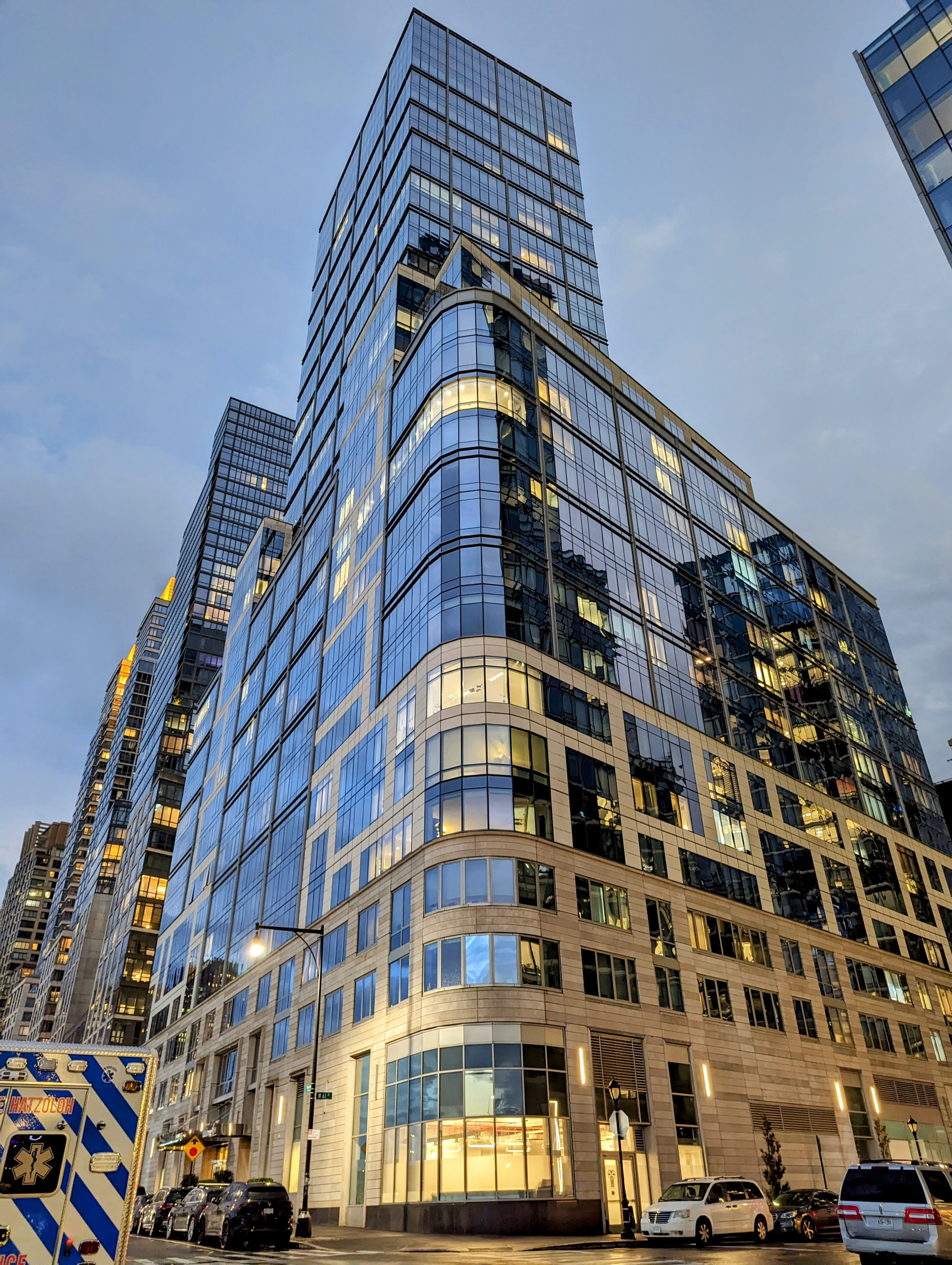
- One Riverside Park
- Interactive map of the One Riverside Park area

General information
- Status: Completed
- Type: Residential
- Location: 40 Riverside Boulevard or 425 Freedom Place, New York, NY 10069; United States
- Coordinates: 40.774117°N 73.991373°W
- Construction started: 2012; 14 years ago
- Completed: 2015; 11 years ago
- Opening: 2016; 10 years ago

Technical details
- Floor count: 33

Design and construction
- Architect: Goldstein, Hill & West Architects
- Developer: Extell Development Company
- Structural engineer: WSP Cantor Seinuk
- Other designers: Shamir Shah

One Riverside Park is a skyscraper at 40 Riverside Boulevard in Riverside South, on the Upper West Side neighborhood of Manhattan, New York City. Its name was later changed to 50 Riverside Boulevard following media reports related to the development's "poor door". The building consists of 33 floors containing 219 residential units.

The building was designed by the architectural firm Goldstein, Hill & West Architects, who also designed the Aldyn and the Ashley, also on Riverside Boulevard, plus the Silver Towers Manhattan development. The building has a tunnel linking residents to the La Palestra Athletic Club & Spa next door in the Aldyn.

== Location ==
One Riverside Park is the last of the exclusively residential developments in Riverside South, hence the "one" name indicating its position at the start of Riverside Boulevard. The One Riverside Park address and brand were trademarked in April 2013 by the Extell Development Company.

To the south of One Riverside Park, the other side of 62nd Street, Riverside Center will provide services to the high rise developments in the Riverside South site. Riverside Center will feature 3.2 acres of open space, a new K-8 public school and over 100,000 square feet of retail, shops and services.

The last potentially remaining development of the Riverside South site would be the possible relocation and burying of the West Side Highway in front of One Riverside Park from approximately West 59th Street to West 72nd Street to facilitate an expansion of Riverside Park. Plans for this work on the highway were approved by the Federal Highway Administration in 2001. However, given the 1990s reconstruction of the highway viaduct, the additional highway development is uncertain, at least in the near term.

== Controversy ==
In 2013, Extell came under fire in the New York Post and Gawker Media for building separate entrances for the affluent condominium tenants and the Affordable Housing tenants, a "poor door". However, as the New York Post writer Steve Cuozzo pointed out, two entrances are "not only legal, they’re legally required."
