= Paul Willen =

American architect (1928–2022)

Paul Willen (August 29, 1928 – February 2, 2022) was an American architect. He was one of the designers of Riverside South, Manhattan.

== Early life and education ==
Paul Willen was born on August 29, 1928. He lived in Westchester County and then moved to New York City, the Fieldston School. His sister, Deborah, now Deborah Meier, is the educator and public-school reformer.

In 1951, Willen received a BA from Oberlin College. In 1953, he received a MA in history and Russian from Columbia University.

== Career ==
After graduating from Columbia, Willen worked for Radio Free Europe for a few years. He then went to the Pratt Institute, graduating with an MA in architecture in 1962.

In 1962, Willen went to work in the office of Marcel Breuer. While working there he worked on the new Whitney Museum on Madison Avenue.

== Personal life ==
Willen was briefly married to Jane Maher, before their union was annulled. He then married Drenka (Opalic), but they later divorced. He was partnered to Marie Madeleine Saphire for 25 years until his death. Willen died on February 2, 2022, at the age of 93.
