= Riverside South, Manhattan =

Building complex in New York City

Riverside South
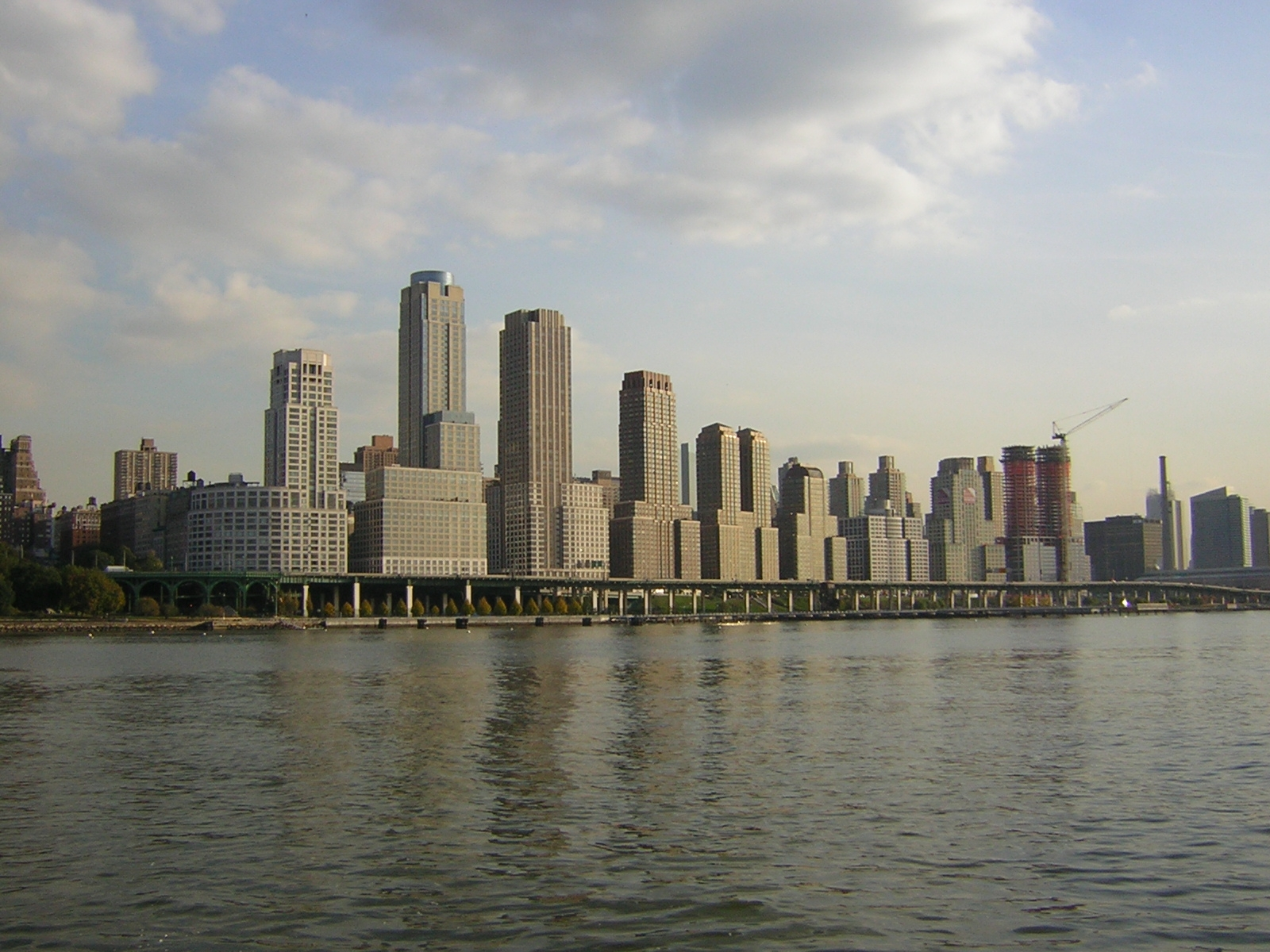
- A view of the complex from the Hudson River
- Interactive map of Riverside South
- Other names: Freedom Place and Riverside Center (for parts)
- Location: Manhattan, New York City, New York
- Coordinates: 40.778°N 73.989°W
- Status: All buildings complete; highway relocation begun, but incomplete.
- Groundbreaking: 1997
- Constructed: 1997–2020
- Use: Residential
- Website: ExtellDev

Companies
- Architect: Daniel Gutman and Paul Willen; Marilyn Taylor and David Childs, SOM
- Developer: The Trump Organization, Hudson Waterfront Associates, Extell Development Company
- Owner: Extell Development and The Carlyle Group
- Planner: Riverside South Planning Corporation

Technical details
- Cost: US$3 billion
- Buildings: 19
- Size: 8.4 million square feet (780,000 m^{2})
- Proposed: 1989 (current plan); 1961 (first plan)

Riverside South is an urban development project in the Lincoln Square neighborhood of the Upper West Side of Manhattan, New York City, United States. Developed by the businessman and later U.S. president Donald Trump in collaboration with a group of Asian investors, the largely residential complex is on 57 acres (23 ha) of land along the Hudson River between 59th Street and 72nd Street. The $3 billion project, which replaced a New York Central Railroad yard known as the 60th Street Yard, includes multiple residential towers and an extension of Riverside Park.

There were several proposals for the site in the late 20th century. These included the Litho City plan in the 1960s, Trump's 1970s plan, and the Lincoln West plan of the early 1980s. The current proposal stems from Trump's late-1980s proposal for Television City. Television City was originally designed to include 16 apartment buildings, 1.8 million square feet (170,000 m^{2}) of studio space, 300,000 square feet (30,000 m^{2}) of office space, ancillary retail space, and 75 acres (30 ha) of park land, mostly on the roof of a vast shopping mall. Trump later abandoned his plan and adopted a substantially reduced proposal put forward by a coalition of civic groups. Trump sold Riverside South to investors from Hong Kong and mainland China, which built seven structures starting in 1997. In 2005, the investors sold the remaining unfinished portions to the Carlyle Group and the Extell Development Company, which developed three more buildings. In turn, Extell sold off some of the southernmost plots in the 2010s; these sites became Waterline Square.

== 60th Street Rail Yard ==
Before Riverside South was developed, the site was a rail freight yard owned by the New York Central Railroad, located between 59th and 72nd streets. By 1849 an embankment near West End Avenue, with a span over a tidal lagoon, carried the Hudson River Railroad, later part of New York Central. At the time, much of the current site of Riverside South was still under water. By 1880, what had been river was transformed by landfill into the New York Central Railroad's vast 60th Street Yard. Within the 60th Street Yard, a set of 400-foot-long (120 m) piers extended into the Hudson River, where barges carried railcars across the river to New Jersey. The piers protruded at a 55-degree angle and each contained tracks.

In the 1930s, New York City parks commissioner Robert Moses covered New York Central's rail track north of 72nd Street as part of the West Side Improvement, which also moved rail lines below grade south of 60th Street. The Moses project was bigger than Hoover Dam and created the Henry Hudson Parkway. The adjacent Riverside Park was expanded to the Hudson River.

Until the 1970s, the rail yard area was generally industrial. The area was home to a printing plant for The New York Times between 1959 and 1975, as well as ABC television studios. At the same time, public housing extended to West End Avenue (across the street from the printing plant and the TV studios), and the Lincoln Towers redevelopment project extended to the rail yard boundary along Freedom Place. New York Central merged with the Pennsylvania Railroad to form Penn Central in 1968 as the rail lines were suffering severe financial difficulties. The railroad went bankrupt in 1970, and its assets were sold off in federal court.

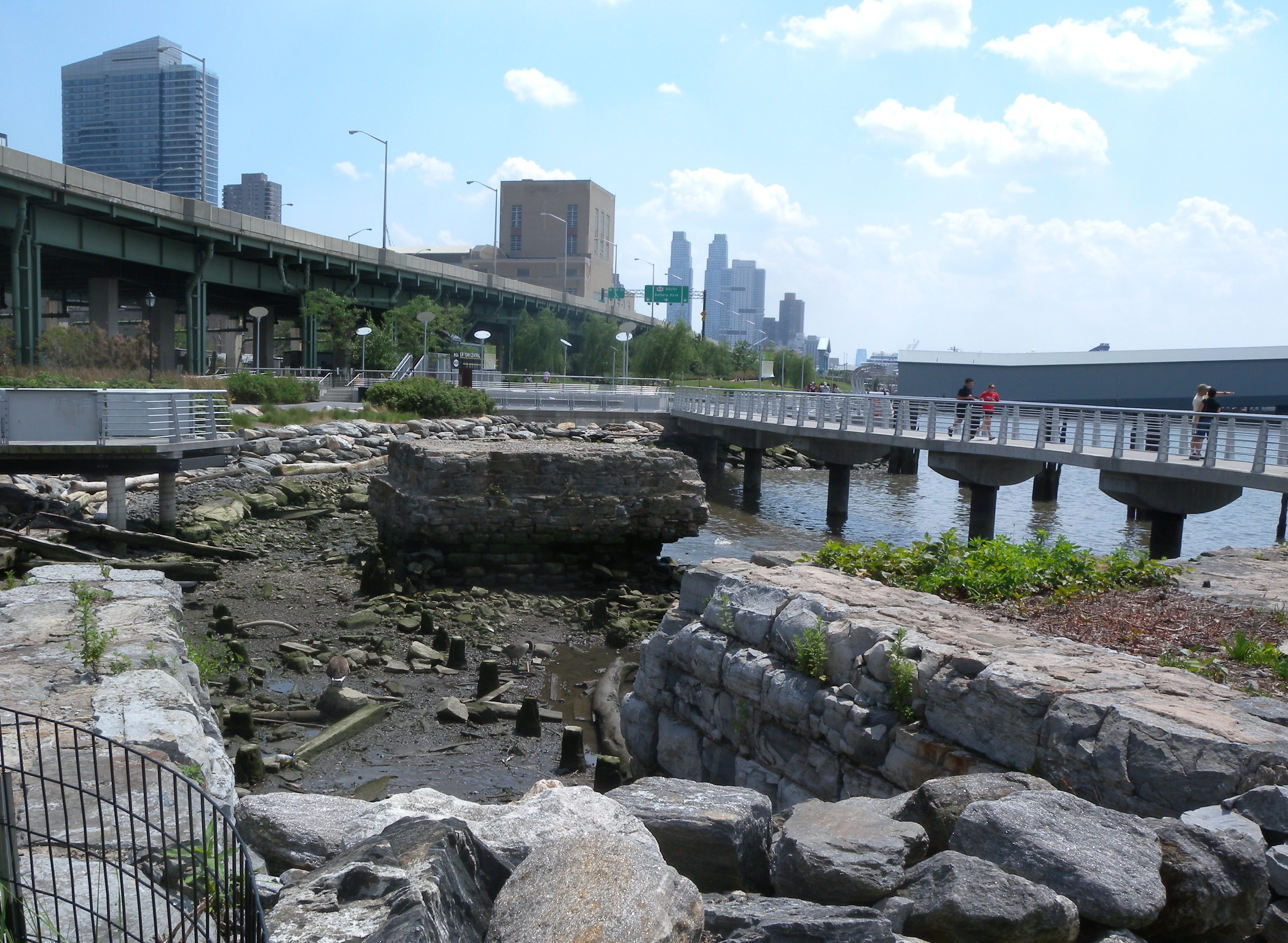
Stonework of a former rail embankment in Riverside Park South

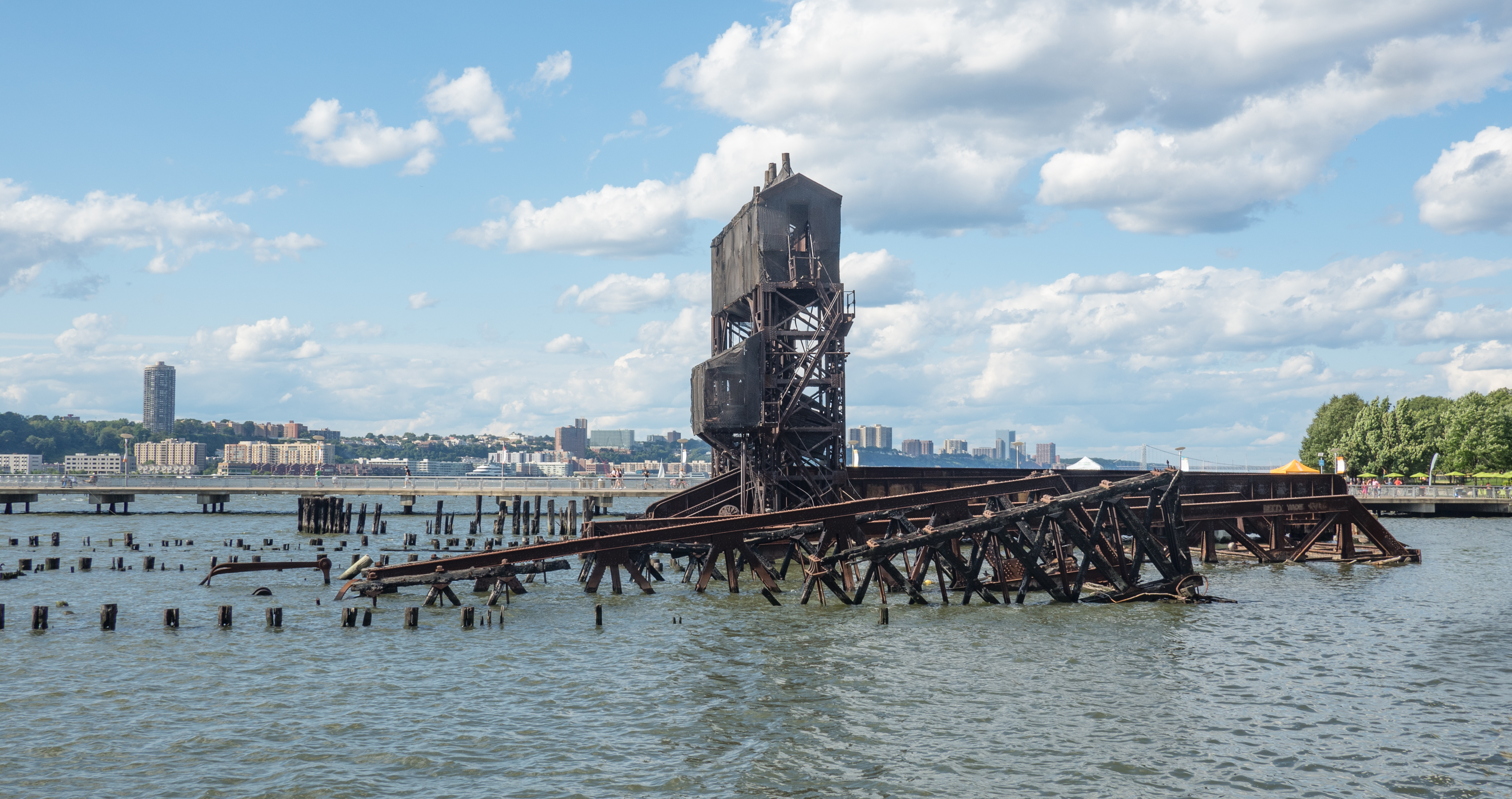
The New York Central Railroad 69th Street Transfer Bridge used to transfer freight by car float across the Hudson, in disuse since the 1970s in Riverside Park South.

== Early redevelopment plans ==
In the late 20th century, there had been several proposals to develop structures over the rail yard. These included the Litho City plan in 1965 and various plans by New York City's Educational Construction Fund in the late 1960s. In his book New York 2000, Robert A. M. Stern described the site as "one of the city's most coveted and contested parcels of open land". The site was hard to develop in part because it did not have roads or utilities, and because any potential redevelopment would have had to be built over the train yard. With Penn Central's bankruptcy in 1975, the ground level became available as well, increasing the potential for development. This led to the businessman Donald Trump's late 1970s plans; the Lincoln West plan of the early 1980s; and Trump's Television City plan of the late 1980s.

=== 1960s plans ===
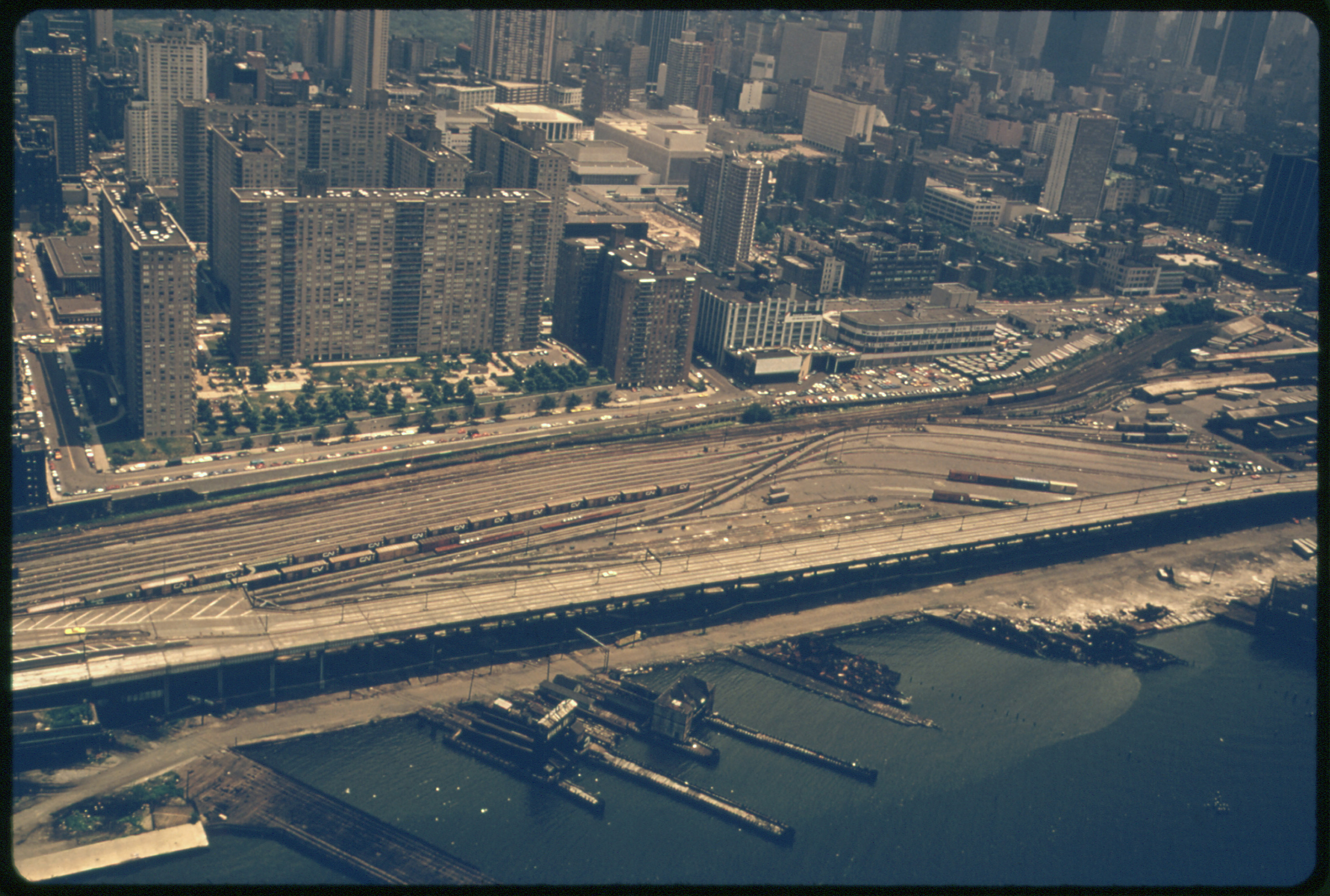
The 60th Street Yard, seen in 1970

In 1961, the railroad proposed a partnership with the Amalgamated Lithographers Union to build Litho City, a mixed-use development over the tracks. There would be six 47-story buildings and three 41-story buildings, all designed by Kelly & Gruzen. The development would have included 200 artists' studios that faced north; the rest of the units would be structured as rental apartments or housing cooperatives. Sources variously cited Litho City as being built to accommodate 12,500 or 25,000 people. The New York City Planning Commission (CPC) deferred action on the Litho City proposal for a year while it reviewed Litho City's effects on traffic in the neighborhood, and the consulting firm of Day & Zimmerman warned that the development might worsen traffic. Nonetheless, the union's president Edward Swayduck and the city's traffic commissioner Henry A. Barnes both endorsed the Litho City plan.

The CPC designated the West Side rail yard as an urban renewal site in October 1962, allowing the plans for Litho City to proceed. Shortly afterward, the Amalgamated Lithographers Union announced plans for a $15 million dormitory in the development, which would house 1,000 foreign students. Plans also called for a promenade linking to Lincoln Center, in addition to a park on the Hudson River shoreline. A scale model of Litho City was unveiled at Grand Central Terminal in 1963. By then, the project was being planned as a high-income development, rather than a middle-income development; the cost of Litho City was estimated at $175 million. There were to be 6,000 apartments, and a new street, running parallel to the yard between 66th and 70th streets, was also proposed. Moses also planned to build an exit from the West Side Highway to Litho City, prompting objections that the street grid could not handle the additional traffic.

The plans for Litho City were formally dropped in January 1966 due to disputes over the air rights; the railroad had terminated the union's lease of the site two months prior. In the late 1960s, there were various proposals by the city's Educational Construction Fund for mixed residential and school projects, also partly on landfill. This development would have included several athletic fields and between 6,000 and 12,000 apartments. In the early 1970s, Robert Moses proposed relocating the highway between 59th and 72nd streets inland to facilitate an extension of Riverside Park, but he failed to convince the state Department of Transportation. The state rejected that proposal because of the presumed negative effect on development opportunities and because it would violate the Blumenthal Amendment, which prohibited any highway construction that would alter Riverside Park.

=== First Trump proposal and sale ===
External images
- Litho City
- Robert Moses' Highway and Housing Proposal, 1975
- Donald Trump's 1975 Proposal
- Donald Trump's 1976 Proposal
- Lincoln West
- Television City
- Trump City

In July 1974, Trump Enterprises Inc., a company controlled by Trump, offered to buy an option on the 100-acre (40 ha) 60th Street Yard and the 44-acre (18 ha) 30th Street Yard for a combined $100 million. Trump did not make a down payment. Penn Central, which at the time was under trusteeship due to its insolvency, petitioned its trustees to approve the sale. Though both of the yards were still being used by freight trains, the only structures on the sites were storage buildings and train tracks. Following a private meeting with Trump, his father Fred, and Mayor Abraham Beame, Penn Central's trustees gave the option to Trump because he "seemed best positioned [...] to get rezoning and government financing". A U.S. federal court approved Penn Central's sale of the option to Trump in March 1975.

Initially, Trump wanted to build up to 20,000 housing units on the site. At the time, he had never completed a major real-estate development before. Local politicians including U.S. Representative Bella Abzug expressed concerns about the fact that the 60th Street redevelopment would cater mostly to middle- and upper-class families. Trump presented plans for the development to local residents in April 1976. As part of the proposal, designed by Gruzen & Partners, the site would be divided into three residential clusters with at least four buildings each; about 40 percent of the development would be open space, and there would be one or two schools and a central shopping mall. Trump's plan called for the West Side Highway to be relocated inward to provide more space near the river, which the Department of City Planning endorsed in concept. There would have been 14,500 apartments on the site, funded with federal subsidies. Manhattan Community Board 7, representing the neighborhood that included the rail yard, opposed the plan. The state had previously examined the idea of moving the highway inland, but had rejected it, in part because of the presumed negative effect on potential development. Trump apparently never got far enough with his plan to persuade them otherwise.

Trump's proposal was dependent on public financing that never materialized. He tried various architectural schemes and twice downsized his plans for the yards. In May 1979, Trump exercised his option on the site, agreeing to buy the yard for $28 million. Had Trump finalized the acquisition, he would have been required to make payments over 18–30 months, after which he could take title to the site. However, Trump never finalized his purchase, and his father's longtime friend Abe Hirschfeld agreed to take over the option instead. By then, the city government was contemplating building a freight yard for piggyback trains on the site. Penn Central signed a sale contract in March 1980, agreeing to sell Hirschfeld and his son Elie the site for $28 million. Under the terms of the contract, the Hirschfelds made a $400,000 down payment and were required to spend $700,000 on planning over the next year. Trump later said that his decision to let his option expire was "the toughest business decision in my life."

=== Lincoln West ===
Abe Hirschfeld and the Argentine astrophysicist Carlos Varsavsky acquired the 60th Street Yard site in late 1980. Varsavsky's company, the Macri Group, became the project's majority partner, with a 65% ownership stake; the Hirschfelds held the remaining 35% stake.

==== Initial plan ====
Hirschfeld and Varsavsky formed a partnership named Lincoln West Associates to develop a project known as Lincoln West on the 60th Street Yard site. Macri hired Gruzen & Partners to draw up plans for the project, and he hired former deputy mayor John Zuccotti and lawyer Judah Gribetz to consult on the project. Rafael Viñoly assisted Gruzen with the plans. The initial plans, announced in January 1981, called for 16 residential towers with a total of 4,850 apartments, arranged around a new avenue called Lincoln Boulevard. There would also be a 500-room hotel, one or two office towers, and 42 acres (17 ha) of open space. A 4,000-space parking garage would have been located underneath the development. Due to the topography of the site, the buildings at both the northern and southern ends would have been located on a platform, and Lincoln Boulevard would have been built with two levels. The first apartments would have begun construction in 1982, while the rest of the development would have been built in phases over a decade.

Lincoln West Associates submitted a formal proposal for the site in November 1981. In late 1981, Lincoln West Associates offered to give $10,000 to Community Board 7 for a study of the project's impacts. The plans had to undergo community review. Opponents claimed that the development would overload the area's infrastructure, and other critics took issue with the development's size and the lack of affordable housing. The firm of McKeown & Franz conducted an environmental impact statement (EIS) for the site. The EIS found that the project would create 7,000 jobs, but that it would also overload existing transit infrastructure due to the presence of 9,200 additional commuters. Community Board 7 refused to support the project unless it was downscaled to include fewer than 4,000 residential units. Ultimately, Hirschfeld and Varsavsky agreed to pay for infrastructure improvements in the neighborhood. The New York Times' architecture critic Paul Goldberger wrote that, while he preferred a design that "look[ed] like the tightly woven cityscape of Riverside Drive or Central Park West," he hoped that the project was not "studied and debated and talked out of existence" by too much public review.

Macri sent the plans to the CPC for review in March 1982 but, despite the concerns over Lincoln West's size, initially refused to scale down the plans. The same month, the city asked Lincoln West Associates to postpone its plans so the city could decide whether to build a new freight terminal there, and Lincoln West Associates agreed to restart the community review process. Additionally, part of the parking garage was replaced with space for trucking company, and the number of apartments was reduced to 4,700. Manhattan borough president Andrew Stein wanted the project to be further reduced to 3,700 apartments, which Varsavsky refused. The engineering firm Tippetts Abbett McCarthy Stratton conducted a feasibility study of the proposed freight-rail center, finding that it was feasible to build it under Lincoln West, though Varsavsky opposed the freight center.

==== Approval, lawsuits, and modifications ====
The CPC approved the Lincoln West plans in July 1982, disregarding most of the opponents' objections to the project, although it asked the developers to reduce the project's size. The New York City Board of Estimate also gave its approval that September. The plans called for 1,100 rental apartments (of which one-fifth would be affordable housing), in addition to 3,200 luxury co-ops or condos. In addition, the developers agreed to add several amenities such as a swimming pool, a park, and upgrades to two nearby subway stops. Lincoln West Associates paid $13 million for the northern five blocks shortly after the plans were approved, and it paid $21.6 million that December for the southern eight blocks. The developers had planned to begin construction in April 1983, but the plans were delayed after Varsavsky's sudden death in early 1983. Francisco Macri took over Varsavsky's 65% interest in the project.

Delays also arose from various lawsuits. Opponents sued in the New York Supreme Court in February 1983, alleging that the EIS had been done improperly. The EIS was invalidated the next month, though the city government successfully appealed the ruling. The New York Court of Appeals, the state's highest court, ruled in October 1983 that the EIS had been prepared properly. In addition, Harry Helmsley, who owned an option on a superblock from 61st to 65th streets, sued the city and Lincoln West Associates, claiming that the city wanted to build three streets through his property.

Though work had still not begun by early 1984, Lincoln West's developers were already revising the plans significantly, prompting its chairman to resign. Additionally, in July 1984, Chase Manhattan Bank moved to foreclose on two mortgages that had been placed on the site. The city government would have canceled the development if the street grid had not received final approval by that September, but the Board of Estimate voted to extend the deadline by one month. That October, the Board of Estimate approved plans for Lincoln West's street grid and voted to give Lincoln West Associates four additional months to obtain financing. By then, public officials doubted that Lincoln West would ever be completed, amid continued opposition to the project. Lincoln West Associates ultimately could not receive financing for the development, partly because of Macri's concessions to the city and partly because Trump was trying to retake control of the site.

=== Television City ===
Trump negotiated to repurchase Lincoln West in mid-1984; he initially decided against it but ultimately made an offer for the site that November. Trump announced in December 1984 that he would pay $95 million for the Lincoln West site; this was part of a $115 million transaction that gave him control of the rail yard. Under the agreement, he controlled 80% of the project, Elie Hirschfeld retained a 20% stake, and Francisco Macri gave up his interest in the project. Trump initially anticipated constructing towers as tall as 60 stories, rather than a variety of low-rise buildings, as Lincoln West Associates had been proposed. He hired the Chicago–based architect Helmut Jahn in January 1985 to design the as-yet-unnamed development on the site. Trump, who called the Lincoln West tract "one of the best pieces of real estate in the country," contemplated erecting up to 8,000 apartments there. He also wanted to build a supertall skyscraper, following two unsuccessful approvals to build such a tower at the New York Coliseum site and on Wall Street.

==== Initial plan ====
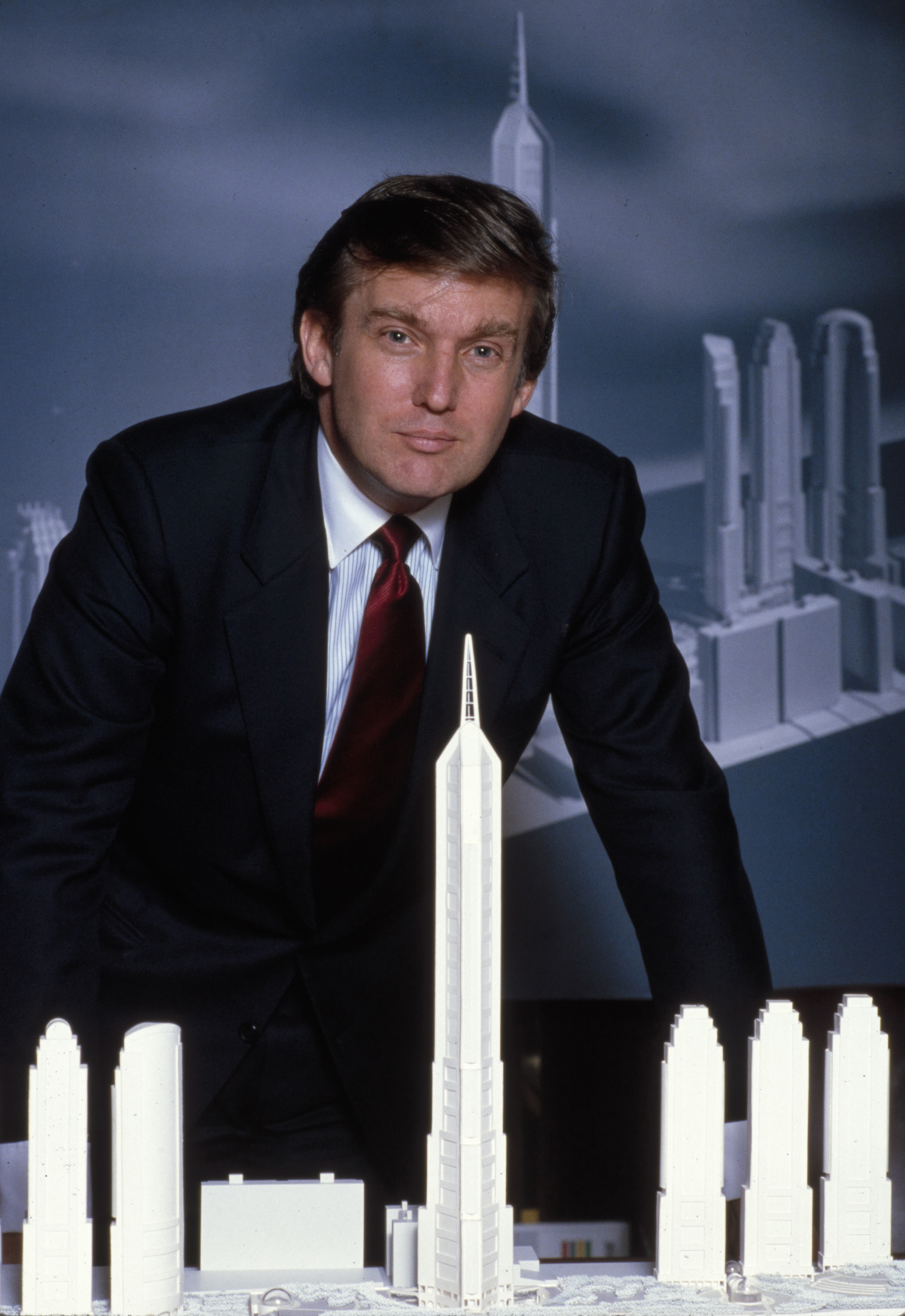
Trump standing beside a model of the proposed Television City in 1985

In November 1985, Trump announced plans for the Television City complex, which would feature a television studio headquarters. The plan involved 7,900 apartments, along with retail, office, and television studio space. A 150-story supertall tower would rise from the middle of the complex, near 66th Street. The skyscraper would have included 750 hotel rooms and 60 floors of residences, and it would have been 1,670 feet (510 m) tall, making it the world's tallest building. Several other towers, each 72 or 76 stories high, would flank the 150-story tower, and there would be 3.6 million square feet (330,000 m^{2}) of television studio space. In addition, the development would have 8,500 parking spaces, 40 acres (160,000 m^{2}) of parkland, and 1.7 million square feet (160,000 m^{2}) of retail space. Shortly after the plans were announced, Trump and the media company NBC discussed the possibility of relocating NBC's headquarters from Rockefeller Center to Television City. Trump met with other television networks as well, including ABC and CBS. The urban planner Norman Levin, who had formerly worked for Gruzen, was in charge of 20 separate teams who were working on the project.

Crain's New York called Trump's plan "the most ambitious development project ever in New York". Goldberger wrote that Television City was "woefully simplistic" and that the towers' designs had only a tenuous relationship with the street grid. New York Magazine's architecture critic Carter Wiseman agreed, writing "isolated towers", such as those proposed in Television City, "survive in most of the world's major cities as reminders to planners that this brand of angst-inducing exclusivity is nasty to live with". Wiseman also said the development would cause overcrowding at the 72nd Street/Broadway station of the New York City Subway. A writer for the New York Daily News described the buildings as "intimidating and psychologically disturbing, dwarfing everything that's human in scale".

The proposal needed both a new EIS and a public review, and Trump hired McKeown & Franz to conduct the EIS. As such, construction could not start until 1987; Trump predicted that it would take five years to complete. The project soon received large amounts of opposition. Local residents expressed skepticism to the project, citing its size and the fact that it targeted the upper middle class. The Coalition Against Lincoln West called Television City "doubly excessive", dubbing it as even more extreme than the Lincoln West plan, while other opponents were specifically against the 150-story tower. Opponents ranged from small associations to the Westpride group, the latter of which enlisted notable neighborhood residents and raised hundreds of thousands of dollars to fund the effort. Trump was initially reluctant to acquiesce to opponents' demands, fearing that doing so would endanger the development. Trump tentatively agreed to sell Kumagai Gumi a 25% ownership stake in the development in 1986, but the agreement was rescinded due to disagreements over how much Kumagai Gumi was to pay.

==== Changes in plans ====
When it became clear that Helmut Jahn's plan would not be approved by the City Planning Commission, Trump decided to replace Jahn as Television City's master planner. In June 1986, he appointed Alexander Cooper as the site's new master planner; Jahn remained the architect for the proposed supertall tower. Newsday described Cooper as having a "sensitivity to scale" that contrasted with Trump's bold style. Trump and Cooper announced revised plans for Television City in October 1986. Justifying the World's Tallest Building, which would still have 136 stories rather than 150 stories, Cooper claimed that the supertall tower would include less office floor area than the Sears Tower or either of the World Trade Center's twin towers. The modified project still contained roughly the same amount of space, including 1.5 million square feet (140,000 m^{2}) each of studio and retail space as well as 7,600 housing units. The six 72-story towers were replaced with slightly smaller, 45- to 57-story skyscrapers, which line one side of an avenue that would run north-south through most of the development. The plan included fewer parking spaces and more parkland as well.

Cooper's version of Television City still received criticism. Peter Marcuse of Columbia University expressed doubts that the 150-story tower was economically feasible, and Kenneth Frampton, also of Columbia, described the building as "a violent irrelevancy". Meanwhile, Goldberger, while sympathetic to Cooper's intentions, nevertheless wavered between hoping that the CPC would cut the project to a reasonable size and fearing that even a smaller version of Television City is "the answer to the wrong question" because "it does not begin by asking the basic question of what would be best to put on this site."

By early 1987, Trump was negotiating to lease the entirety of the supertall skyscraper's office space to General Electric (GE), which at the time owned NBC. Trump offered to sell the site to the New York State Urban Development Corporation and lease it back for 99 years. In exchange, Trump would have received a 20-year or 30-year tax abatement for Television City, which would have been the highest-valued abatement ever granted in New York City. Trump also offered to give the city government a portion of Television City's profits. Despite widespread public support for Trump's tax abatement, the city rejected Trump's proposal, and Mayor Ed Koch offered the tax breaks directly to NBC instead of to Trump. Negotiations between Trump and Koch devolved into name-calling; Trump called on Koch to resign, and Koch compared Trump to "a stuck pig". The plans called for 11 residential buildings, about 2 million square feet (190,000 m^{2}) of office space, several parks, and a 152-story tower by mid-1987. The department store chain Bloomingdale's negotiated to lease space in Television City as well.

The project continued to face major opposition; for example, Westpride raised over $20,000 at a late-1987 fundraiser opposing Television City. Trump indicated that September that he wanted to sell NBC part of the Television City parcel for $20 million, and he also tried to entice financial services firms to move there. The Trump Organization also conducted a new EIS to appease opponents' concerns about Television City. The new EIS, published in October 1987, found that the development would cast shadows on the neighborhood, overload local transportation infrastructure, and interfere with television broadcasts. New Yorkers for Parks, then known as The Parks Council, commissioned a scale model of Television City, which it used to demonstrate shadows that the development would create on Riverside Park and the high winds the tall tower would create on its own parks.

==== Renaming and further revisions ====
At the end of October 1987, NBC decided against moving to Television City, even as Trump Organization officials claimed that the EIS was close to being approved. Politico reporter Michael Kruse wrote that the CPC likely would never have approved Trump City, though David W. Dunlap of The New York Times wrote that much of the project might have indeed been approved. Afterward, Trump initially planned to replace the television studio with a park or movie theater, even while preserving other aspects of the plans. In February 1988, Trump announced a revised plan for the project, which was renamed Trump City. The TV studio space was replaced with parkland, two small office buildings were added, and 760 of the apartments were designated as affordable housing for the elderly. The 150-story tower was retained, and there were to be 13 smaller towers. Goldberger wrote that Trump had added the affordable housing units to increase the likelihood of getting community approval, a sentiment shared by the project's opponents. By October 1988, Trump fueled speculation that he might sell the site. Despite receiving five offers, all for hundreds of millions of dollars, if his claims can be believed, Trump ultimately decided to keep the site.

Westpride, which had 4,200 members at the end of 1988, continued to fight Trump City, and local civic groups promised to sue the city government if Trump City were approved. A main target would be Trump's suggested air rights transfer of 4.5 million square feet (420,000 m^{2}) from a 19-acre (7.7 ha) tract under the Hudson River to the rest of Trump City. Meanwhile, Community Board 7 and the Municipal Art Society jointly sponsored a "West Side Futures" study that recommended extending Riverside Park and the Manhattan street grid through the site, and limiting building density to a moderate level.

Furthermore, delays arose in 1989 when the city government investigated complaints that the Trump Organization was relocating possibly-contaminated dirt from Trump City to Fresh Kills Landfill. Trump alleged that Koch's administration was delaying the review of the project's EIS. In early 1990, Trump submitted a draft EIS to the New York City Council, which called for the structures to be built in several phases. Trump had spent nearly $200 million to date, even though construction had not started. Trump was paying tens of millions of dollars a year just to maintain the site.

The New York chapter of the American Institute of Architects issued a detailed critique of Trump City. Goldberger wrote that Trump City had turned into "a national symbol both of massive, overreaching development and of diehard community opposition to it". In response, Trump hired an advertiser to promote the development to residents in the New York metropolitan area. By that August, routine scaled-down plans for the site required by environmental review procedures fueled speculation that the Trump City proposal would collapse. However environmental review continued and was completed around February 1991.

=== Manhattan West and ABC proposals ===
In 1985, the developer Daniel Brodsky acquired the land just east of the yard between 61st and 64th streets. He proposed a development known as Manhattan West, which initially called for 1,375 apartments, and he also wanted NBC to relocate to the site. By 1987, his plans called for 1,200 affordable and luxury apartments across more than 1 million square feet (93,000 m^{2}), in addition to 2.5 acres (1.0 ha) of parkland. The apartments would have been located in an L-shaped building with several roofs measuring up to 39 stories high, as well as 28-story building to the south. The CPC forced Manhattan West to conform to Television City's site plan, which included a block-wide park between 63rd and 64th streets extending east to West End Avenue. A new version of the plan, with 1,000 apartments and only 600,000 square feet (56,000 m^{2}), was proposed in 1989. The Board of Estimate approved the revision in February 1990, and work on Manhattan West began in 1994.

Meanwhile, Brodsky had sold off the northernmost 2 acres (0.81 ha) of the Manhattan West site to Capital Cities/ABC in 1986. By the 1990s, Capital Cities/ABC was planning to erect three 39-story residential buildings and several television studios. The residential buildings, with a combined 930 units, would have been located from 64th to 65th streets, while the studios would have been located to the north. Capital Cities/ABC's proposal was submitted for public review in 1992, but Community Board 7 rejected the original plans. Capital Cities/ABC then canceled one of the towers and downsized the project to 500 apartments.

== Riverside South ==
=== Civic organizations' proposal ===
==== Initial plan ====
External images
- The Civic Alternative
- Riverside South, as proposed

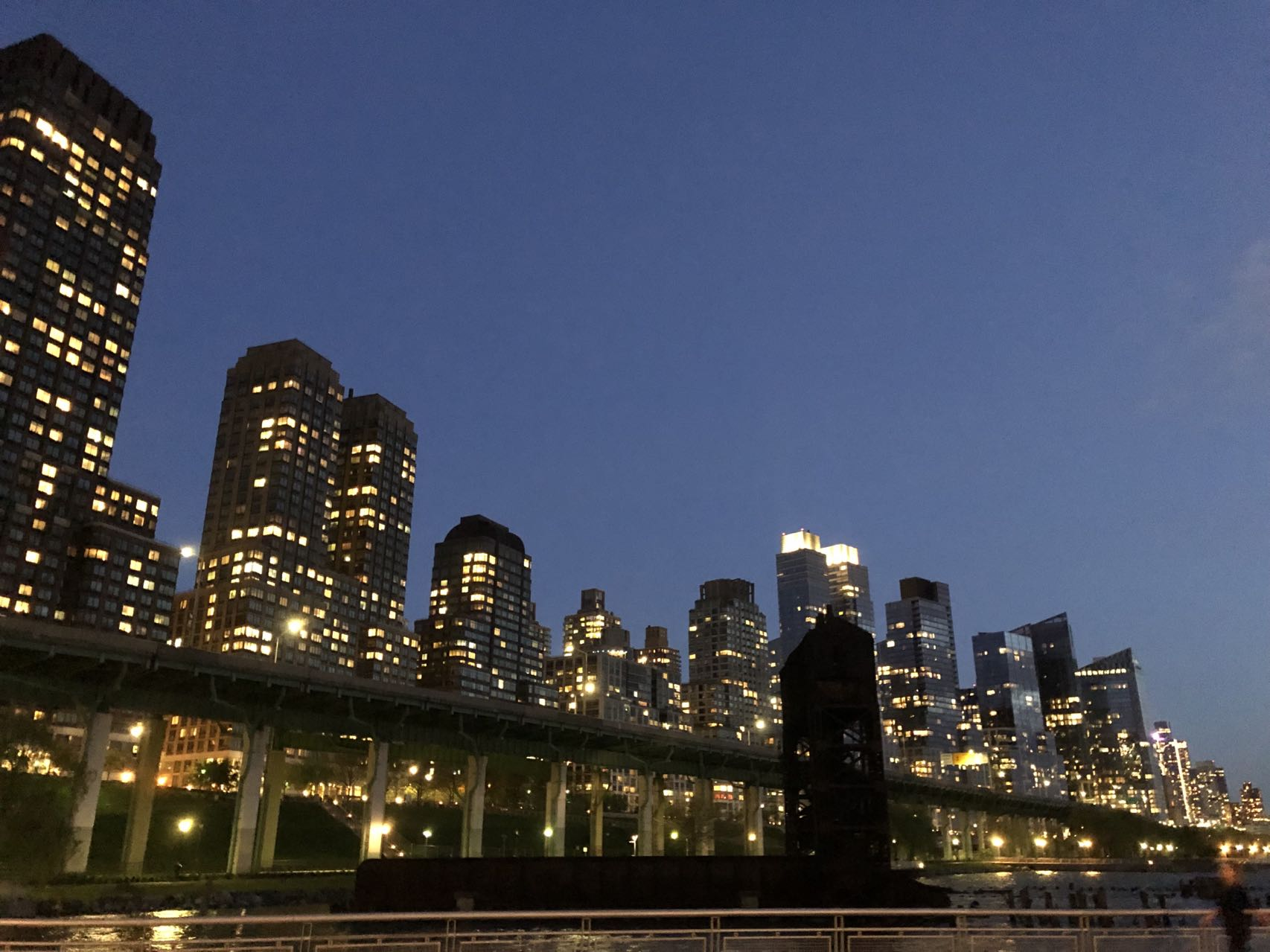
Riverside Park Pier I

At the end of 1989, three civic organizations—the Municipal Art Society, New Yorkers for Parks (then known as The Parks Council), and the Regional Plan Association—proposed an alternative plan for the site based on relocating the elevated highway inland and to grade to make room for a 25-acre extension of Riverside Park. Building on that concept, a more complete plan devised by environmental planner Daniel Gutman and the architect Paul Willen called for an exclusively residential project of 7.3 million square feet (680,000 m^{2}) set on an extension of the Manhattan street grid A new Riverside Boulevard would run above the relocated highway, separating residential development on the east side of the road from an extension of Riverside Park sloping down toward the waterfront. Paul Goldberger hailed the proposal as "practical, do-able, and right for the future of New York." Three additional civic groups—The Riverside Park Conservancy (then known as the Riverside Park Fund), Westpride, and the Natural Resources Defense Council—joined, and with the tremendous publicity generated by Paul Goldberger's favorable review, and particularly by the accompanying rendering by Stephen Evanusa, the civics' vision rose while Trump's fortunes began to decline.

First, civic groups had filed a lawsuit in June 1990 to reverse changes to zoning rules for large-scale developments that would have eased approval of Trump City. In November 1990, a New York Supreme Court judge invalidated the zoning changes. Second, emboldened by the civic alternative, local politicians called on the city government to buy the site from Trump. Third, financial pressure on Trump was reaching the bursting point. Chase Manhattan Bank, which had given Trump a mortgage loan on the site, was concerned that the loan might not be repaid, and loans on his Atlantic City casinos were also in deep trouble.

By the beginning of 1991, Trump was negotiating his capitulation with the six civic groups. He formally abandoned plans for Trump City in March 1991. The negotiated compromise was to have 8.3 million square feet (770,000 m^{2}) of space in total. These plans called for 5,500 apartments and up to 1.8 million square feet (170,000 m^{2}) for television studios. Both the city and state governments of New York endorsed the project and eventual relocation of the elevated highway. Goldberger referred to Trump's abandonment of Trump City as a "miracle".

Trump and the six civic groups formed the Riverside South Planning Corporation (RSPC) to design the project, which they called Riverside South. Chase Manhattan Bank, which still held more than $200 million in mortgages on the site, initially paid all of RSPC's expenses. In April 1991, the RSPC hired David Childs of SOM, along with Paul Willen, to oversee Riverside South's design. At the request of Manhattan borough president Ruth Messinger, the American Institute of Architects convened a delegation of planners and architects, who, after an intense weekend of study, endorsed the overall concept, but recommended that the floor area be limited to somewhat less than the 7.3 million square feet (680,000 m^{2}) previously approved for Lincoln West. The RSPC unveiled a scale model of its proposal in August 1991, which showed a curved line of buildings with the tallest residential buildings, 40-50 stories, clustered near either end of the site. There were to be 16 residential buildings, all but three lining the new Riverside Boulevard, and two office buildings on Eleventh Avenue. Trump had not pledged funds to improve nearby subway stations, as local residents had requested and also did not want to add affordable housing units, saying it would be unprofitable to do so.

==== Park design ====
A primary motivation for the Riverside South plan was the 25-acre (10 ha) extension of Riverside Park now known as Riverside Park South. The twenty-foot elevation difference between Riverside Boulevard and the rail yard below allows for the same kind of slopes and grades as in the landmarked Riverside Park to the north. Four artists and Michael Van Valkenburgh, a landscape architect were hired to design the public park, but they failed to coalesce and Van Valkenburgh quit. He was replaced by new landscape architect, Thomas Balsley. The artists later quit, as well, when their "ecological design" was not totally accepted by the city's parks department. Balsley completed two park designs—one an interim design with the elevated highway in place and a final design with the highway moved to the east side of the park. The final design featured a flat extension of Riverside Park between 72nd and 68th streets, culminating in an amphitheater build into a constructed hill at 67th Street, and an arc of land echoing the arc of the highway from there to 63rd Street, featuring a broad lawn gently sloping toward the waterfront. The waterfront would have a rebuilt 750-foot pier, an undulating network of walkways, and an old rail transfer bridge. The decaying hulks of two collapsed piers would remain as picturesque ruins.

During the review process, the two picturesque ruins, remnants of the artists' vision, became controversial and were removed from the approved plan. Also the amphitheater was reduced in size and the seating was transformed into grass-covered terraces.

==== Approval process and objections ====
In May 1992, the CPC granted the Riverside South project a certification, allowing the public review process to commence. However, the project faced opposition because of its size, traffic issues, lack of affordable housing, and its association with Trump. Some residents of Lincoln Towers, which adjoined the rail yard, opposed any development on the site. Minor objections included the fact that the towers might block the west–facing windows of the Chatsworth apartment building on 72nd Street. Residents of 71st Street, a dead end street, objected to the fact that their street would be extended to Riverside Boulevard. A report commissioned for Community Board 7 found that Riverside South would overwhelm the neighborhood's transit infrastructure unless it was reduced to 4,300 apartments, and the community board voted in July 1992 to recommend that the project not proceed. Additionally, Messinger said she would not support the plans without further alterations.

Following these objections, Trump agreed to slightly reduce the project's size, remove the office space, provide funds for the 72nd Street subway station, reserve 12% of the apartments for affordable housing, and build and maintain the new public park. The RSPC agreed to extend 71st Street for pedestrians while preventing through vehicular traffic, and setbacks were increased on each of the buildings. Messinger agreed to support the project after Trump acquiesced to the subway improvements, park, and affordable-housing units, but other critics still strongly opposed the project. U.S. Representative Jerry Nadler described the planned public park as a $10-million-per-acre ($25,000,000/ha) "private backyard for the people who live in these buildings". Amid the opposition, Trump denied that he planned to sell the site. To convince the CPC to approve his plans, Trump agreed to provide even more money for the 72nd Street subway station and designate up to 20% of the apartments as affordable housing. Trump also agreed to extend Riverside Drive southward to alleviate congestion on West End Avenue. The CPC approved the Riverside South plan in October 1992. A New York City Council subcommittee approved the plan that November after Trump agreed to delay the television studios' development, and the full City Council approved Riverside South the next month.

The final project size was 6.1 million square feet (570,000 m^{2})—with an option for 1.8 million square feet (170,000 m^{2}) of television studios on the two southern blocks—as well as a park and improvements to the existing Freedom Place. Goldberger wrote that the final plan "stands a real chance of being a cause for celebration rather than embarrassment." The media estimated that Riverside South. Manhattan West, and the Capital Cities/ABC project would collectively house between 15,000 and 20,000 residents. There was to be a 1-acre (0.40 ha) park at the confluence of the three developments. The first phase of Riverside South called for four 18-to-40-story towers between 65th and 69th streets, with about 1,600 apartments. Ultimately, the development was planned to include 16 buildings with 5,700 apartments, in addition to a 23-acre (9.3 ha) park and 1.8 million square feet of retail.

By March 1993, Trump was applying for tax abatements and funding from the New York state government; at the time, he owed the city $4.4 million in back taxes. Along with Costas Kondylis, Philip Johnson was hired as one of the development's architects that November. Opponents sought to deny the highway project any funding, thinking that would stop the development.

=== Partnership with Asian investors ===
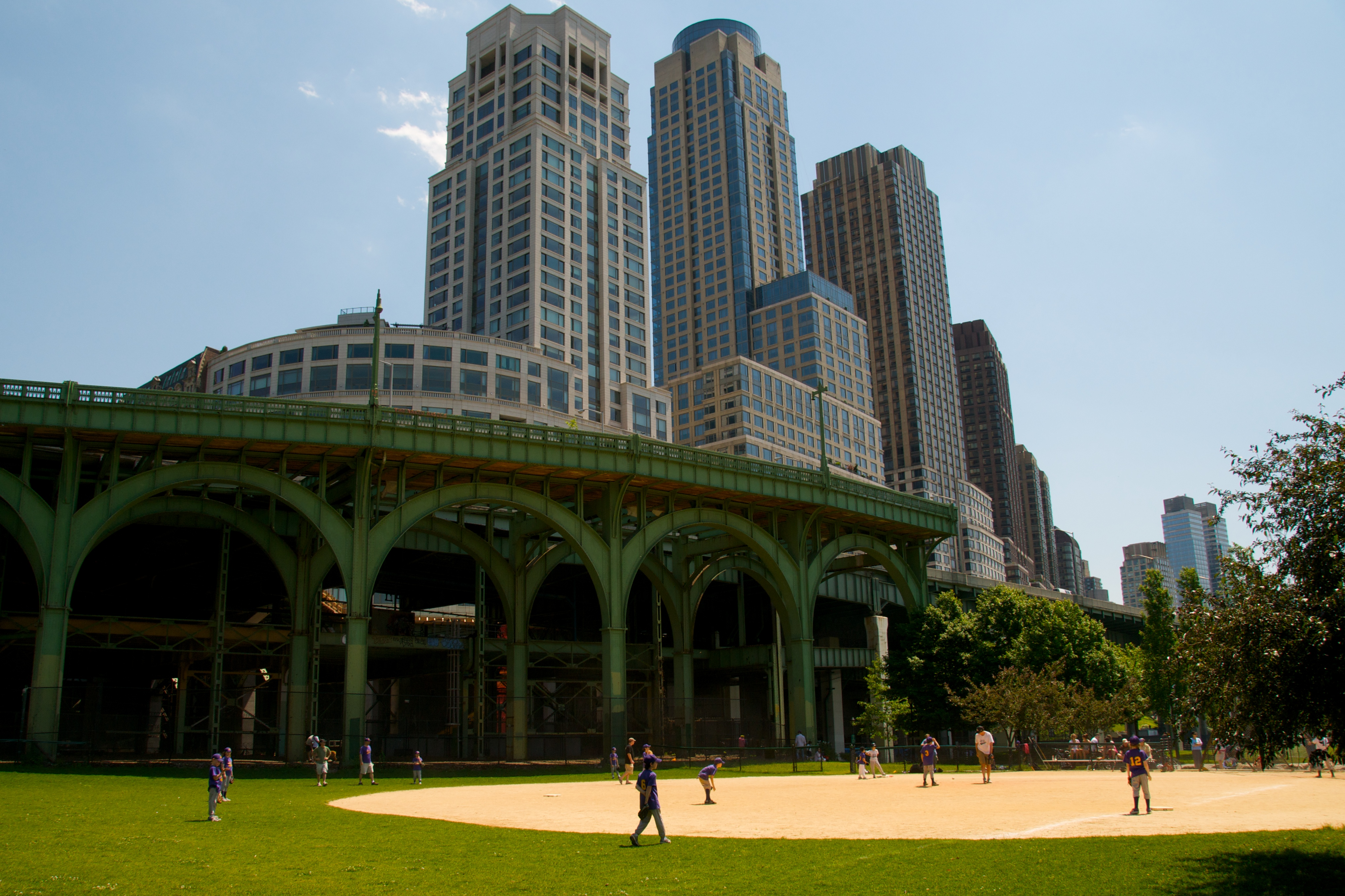
Baseball field at the southern end of Riverside Park with Riverside South buildings in the background

Meanwhile, during the mid-1990s, Chase Manhattan was pressuring Trump to repay the loan on the site, and Trump wanted to refinance the project to pay the debt. Colony Capital offered to buy the debt on Riverside South's loan in late 1993, but these negotiations were unsuccessful. Additional attempts at obtaining funding from American financiers were also unsuccessful, and Trump said in early 1994 that he would apply for a loan from the United States Department of Housing and Urban Development. He subsequently went to Hong Kong to negotiate with the businessman Henry Cheng. The project was also involved in two lawsuits during this time, one of which claimed that the project did not conform to Lincoln West's EIS. The other lawsuit centered around sewage disposal; at the time, Trump estimated that the development would generate 5 million U.S. gallons (19,000,000 L) of sewage a day, but he had not received permission to connect the development's sewage lines to the North River Wastewater Treatment Plant.

Trump sold a controlling interest in the project in June 1994, and a group of four developers from Hong Kong and mainland China, including New World Organization and Polylinks International, bought the controlling stake. Polylinks paid Chase $90 million to settle the project's debt, plus $20 million in back taxes and other fees. The group also committed to spending $2.5 billion on the project itself. Cheng became Riverside South's primary financier and developer, while Trump remained Riverside South's chief promoter. Trump retained a 30% ownership stake in Riverside South, which could be increased if he sold or rented a certain number of apartments. The project was jointly developed by the Trump Organization and Hudson Waterfront Associates, the latter of which represented the Asian investors; they hired feng shui consultants to provide advice on Riverside South's design.

Though Riverside South's financial issues had been resolved, the lawsuits over the development were still pending. Construction was delayed as the lawsuits were resolved and the economy recovered. In February 1995, the city government resolved one of the legal disputes by allowing Trump to connect Riverside South's sewage line to the North River plant. That June, the New York Court of Appeals ruled that the EIS for Riverside South had been conducted properly. There was another controversy over the RSPC's plans to build a temporary playground between 70th and 72nd streets. In the meantime, the new investors sought public financing. Trump applied for a $355 million mortgage for Riverside South from the federal government; if the mortgage were approved, up to 20% of the apartments would have been reserved for low-income or middle-income residents. Trump was accused of paying off New York State Senate majority leader Joseph Bruno for approval, and the project's opponents accused Trump of colluding with Mayor Rudy Giuliani on the mortgage application. Nadler asked the Federal Housing Administration not to give a mortgage to Riverside South.

=== Start of construction ===
==== First structures ====
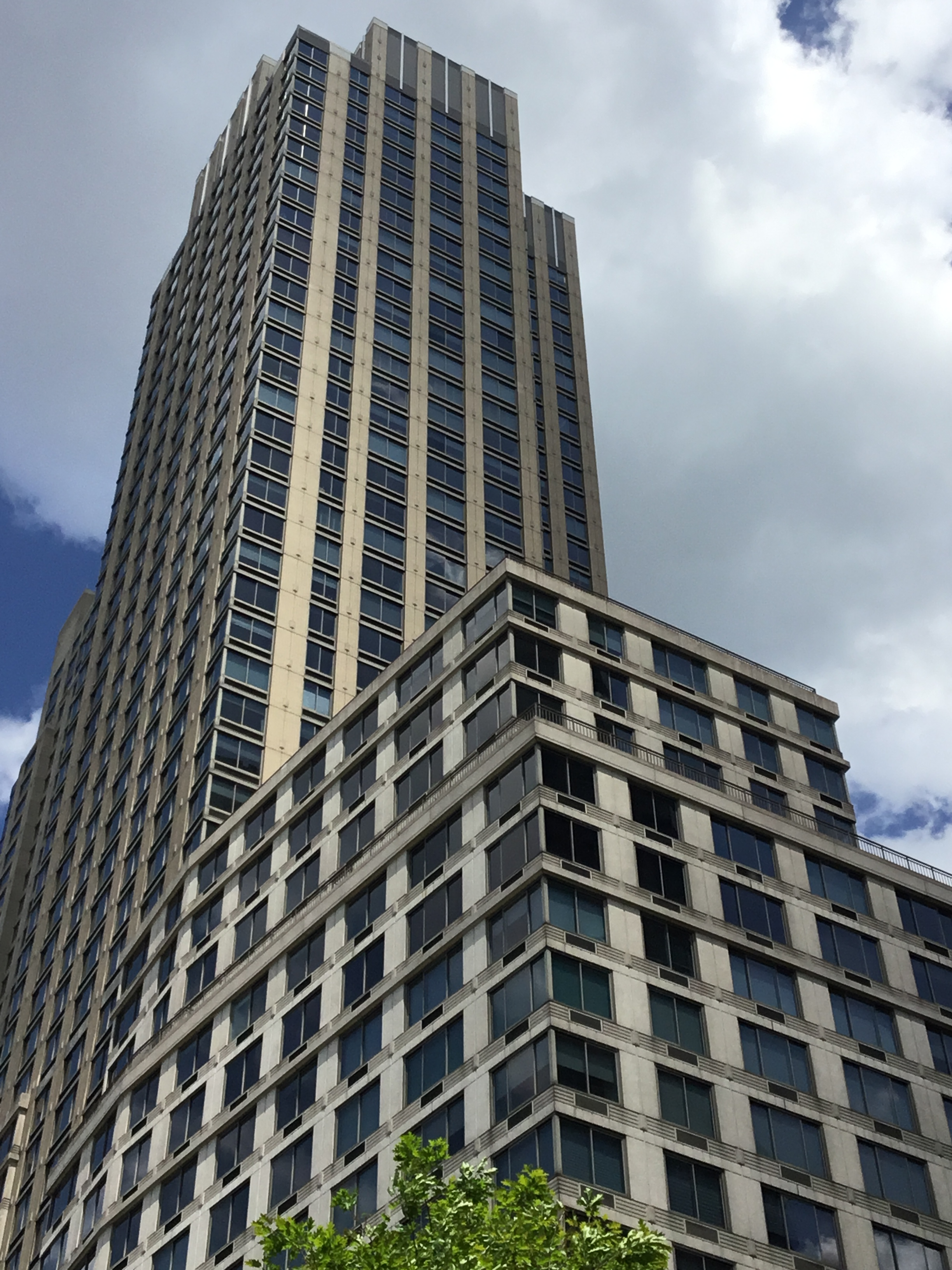
200 Riverside South, one of the first two buildings

Trump and New World Organization hired Lehrer McGovern Bovis as Riverside South's construction manager in April 1995; the firm went on to build eight of Riverside South's towers. Work was delayed for two more years. In December 1996, the New York City Department of Environmental Protection granted Trump permission to connect the development's first structure to the treatment plant, and Trump received private financing for that building. After the city granted a construction permit in January 1997, a shanty town nearby was removed the next month.

By mid-1997, Lehrer McGovern Bovis and HRH Construction were erecting the first two towers at 180 and 200 Riverside Boulevard, which had a combined 990 apartments. One hundred and four units at 180 Riverside were set aside for low-income households. Trump was also negotiating to install a massive statue of the explorer Christopher Columbus at Riverside South. Residents of Lincoln Towers continued to oppose the project, saying it would block their views of the Hudson River. Another group of opponents sued to force Trump to construct Riverside Park South.

During the construction of 200 Riverside Boulevard, a subcontractor used substandard concrete to construct columns supporting the fifth floor, ignoring warnings from the building's structural engineer. The New York City Department of Buildings (DOB) halted construction of the tower that November, after that tower had reached its 20th floor. In addition, the first seven towers were exempt from the city's new seismic code due to a grandfather clause, and two of the towers were also exempt from sprinkler regulations because they were shorter than 300 feet (91 m). Work on 200 Riverside Boulevard resumed in January 1998 after the defective concrete was replaced. By the middle of the year, the TV network CBS was negotiating to occupy studio space in Riverside South, and New World was attempting to sell Riverside South's first two buildings. The developers also rented out apartments at 180 Riverside Boulevard, while Pace Advertising Agency was hired to market the apartments. CBS ultimately decided against moving to Riverside South.

By early 1999, several retailers were negotiating to move into the first two buildings, and many of the condos and rental apartments were being leased out. The first structures were initially branded as Trump Place. New World and Trump placed a 9-acre (3.6 ha) tract between 59th and 61st streets for sale that May, but they were unable to find a buyer.

==== Highway relocation ====
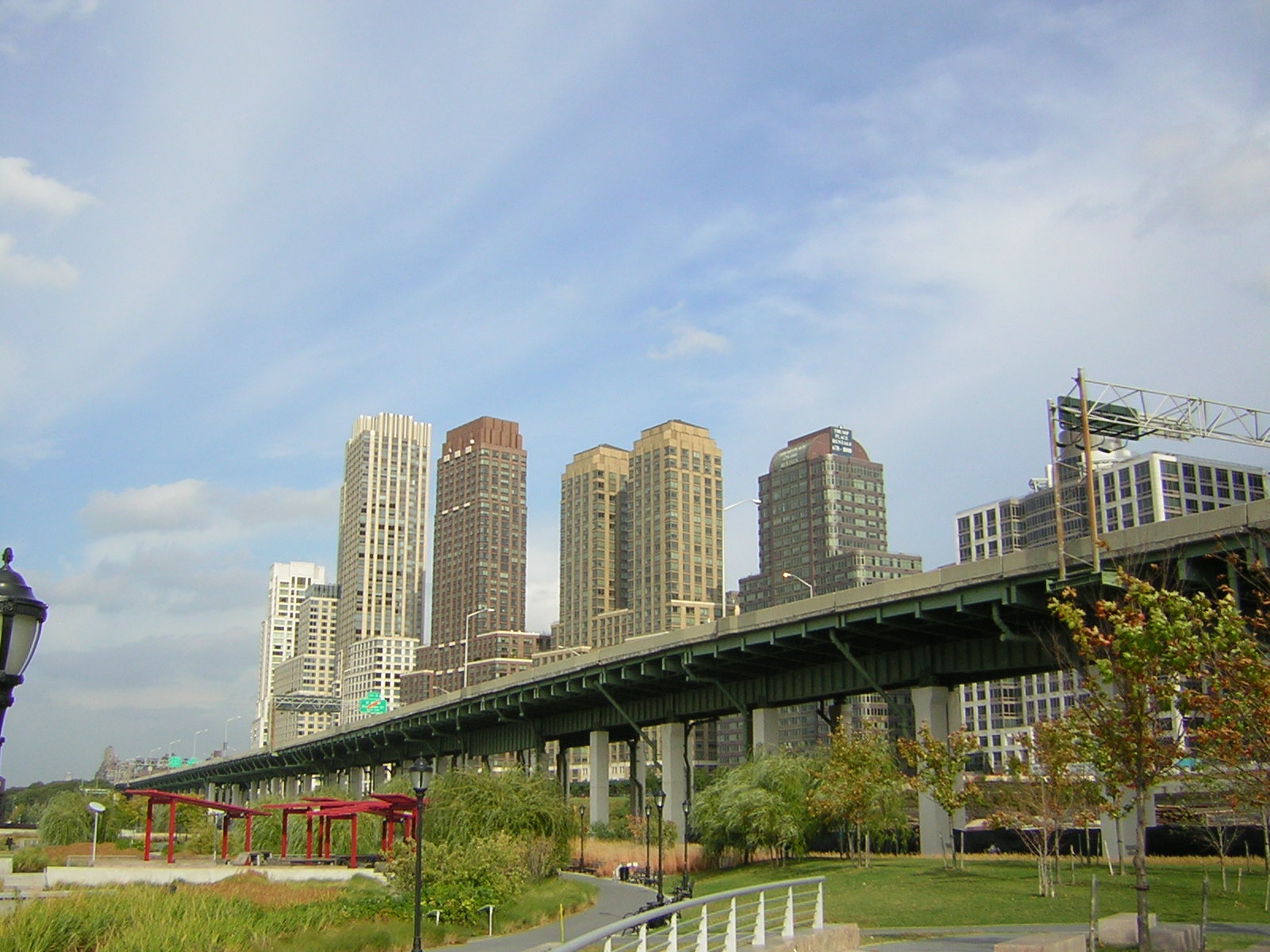
View north from Riverside Park South. Buildings and the West Side Highway are in the background; park elements are in the foreground.

After the first two buildings were started, the highway became a pressing issue. In the next phase of construction, south of 70th Street, the relocated highway would have to start slipping under Riverside Boulevard, which was to be built by the developer. Opponents had both stopped the highway design process and sued to force the developer to construct Riverside Boulevard on structure, hoping to tie the project in knots. In the absence of an approved highway plan, it would be risky to construct supports for Riverside Boulevard because the exact alignment of the relocated highway had not been fixed. And the city had insisted, partly through animus, that the next part of Riverside Boulevard be constructed on fill. Congressman Jerry Nadler also succeeded in removing funding for the highway relocation from transportation bills. The highway design process was eventually restarted and in 2001 the Federal Highway Administration approved the highway relocation.

==== Second phase ====
Work commenced on a third building: a 33-story tower at 160 Riverside Boulevard in 1999. Other developments, such as Tishman Speyer's 101 West End Avenue rental building, were also being built nearby. The M72 bus was rerouted to serve the complex, prompting complaints from neighborhood residents.

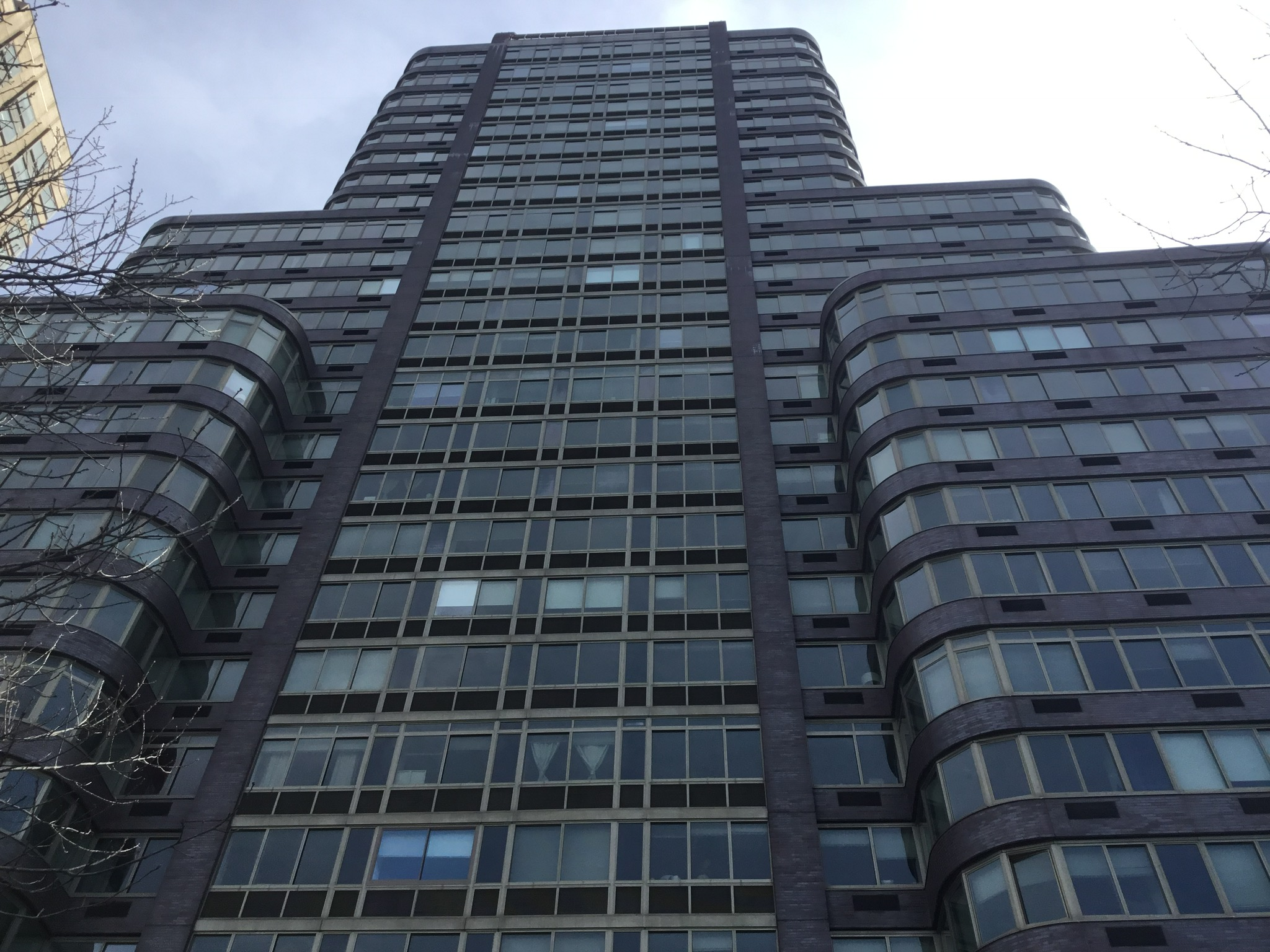
140 Riverside Boulevard, constructed as part of the early 2000s expansion

By early 2000, work was about to begin on a fourth Trump Place building, a condo tower. Later that year, Columbia University began negotiating to construct a satellite campus at the southern end of Trump Place. While Goldman Sachs advised the university that the land's fair value was $65–90 million, Trump was insistent on a $400 million price, leading Columbia to expand in Manhattanville instead. Simultaneously, Trump developed a waterfront public park known as Riverside Park South. Trump was required to expand the park as additional buildings were erected, and he also had to preserve the 69th Street Transfer Bridge. During the park's construction, complaints of sewage smells prompted the Trump Organization to replace 180 Riverside's pipes. The park's first phase, which cost $14 million, unofficially opened in January 2001 and was dedicated that April. Trump Place's real estate brokers, the Corcoran Group, reported higher-than-anticipated interest in the apartments, despite the development's relatively remote location. Despite a slight downturn caused by the September 11 attacks later the same year, the apartments remained in high demand. Also in 2001, Community Board 7 approved the addition of another park on Riverside Boulevard.

Although Trump ceased his active involvement in the development in 2001, he retained his 30% limited partnership. The first retailer at Trump Place, a wine shop, opened in 2002, four years after Trump had begun looking for retail tenants. Trump planned to begin constructing the complex's sixth structure, 240 Riverside Boulevard, the same year, which would have required the closure of the West Side Highway's 72nd Street exit ramp. Work on 240 Riverside was delayed by opposition from residents of the neighboring Chatsworth Apartments, who feared the building would obstruct their windows, as well as objections from local residents who wanted to re-litigate the plan to close the 72nd Street highway exit ramp. Despite the opposition, 240 Riverside was under construction by 2003. A second segment of Riverside Park South opened that June. Nostalgia for the two ruined piers again arose, but was quickly dismissed and they were finally ordered removed. The city government agreed in early 2004 to close the 72nd Street exit ramp; a state judge placed an injunction preventing the ramp's closure, but an appeals court upheld the plans. By the end of 2004, a seventh building at 120 Riverside Boulevard was being completed. The 72nd Street exit ramp was finally closed three years later.

=== Carlyle and Extell operation ===
==== Takeover and additional structures ====
Trump and his partners sold Riverside South, excluding the finished condominiums, to the Carlyle Group and the Extell Development Company for $1.76 billion in June 2005. The syndicate had beat out several other bidders including the Related Companies, Vornado Realty Trust, and the Durst Organization. Carlyle obtained a 50% ownership stake in the project, while Extell took a 25% stake and sold the remaining 25% to an Irish development consortium. Shortly afterward, Carlyle and Extell resold three rental apartment buildings to Equity Residential for $816 million. Trump, who contended that the sale price was just over half what the property was worth, sued his partners, but he lost. The Corcoran Group also sued Trump, claiming that he had failed to pay sales commissions for apartments sold there. Carlyle and Extell also attempted to sell the land between 59th and 61st streets before withdrawing their plans in December 2005. The seventh structure, 120 Riverside Boulevard, opened in early 2006. The third phase of Riverside Park South opened that August, and the development's first supermarket also opened in 2006.

External images
- Highway and northbound tunnel (black wedge shape on right) from Google Maps Street View
- Highway relocation plan.

Also, in 2006 the developers began erecting a tunnel between 61st and 65th streets for the eventual relocation of the West Side Highway. An agreement called for the developer to construct the northbound tunnel as the support for Riverside Boulevard and the state Department of Transportation to construct the adjacent southbound tunnel.

In the mid-2000s, Extell developed the Avery condominium building at 100 Riverside Boulevard, as well as the Rushmore nearby at 80 Riverside Boulevard. The West Side Highway's 72nd Street exit finally closed in June 2007, though the connection from Riverside Boulevard to Riverside Drive did not open for another four years. A fourth section of Riverside Park South opened in 2008. Thomas Balsley subsequently designed three more sections of the park. In addition, Extell began developing the Aldyn condominium and a rental tower between 62nd and 63rd streets in early 2008, and it received a $613 million loan to develop the towers. The Avery was finished in 2008, followed by the Rushmore in 2009 and the Aldyn in 2010. Amid weakening demand for condos at the Aldyn, Avery, and Rushmore, several prospective condo buyers sought to cancel their purchases. Multiple would-be buyers at the Rushmore sued Carlyle and Extell in 2009 after the developers refused to refund their apartment deposits; they received a $15 million refund after three years of litigation. Extell filed plans for 40 Riverside Boulevard (later One Riverside Park), just north of Riverside Center, in 2009, and Hill West Architects was hired to design a 33-story building on that site.

==== Riverside Center and Waterline Square ====
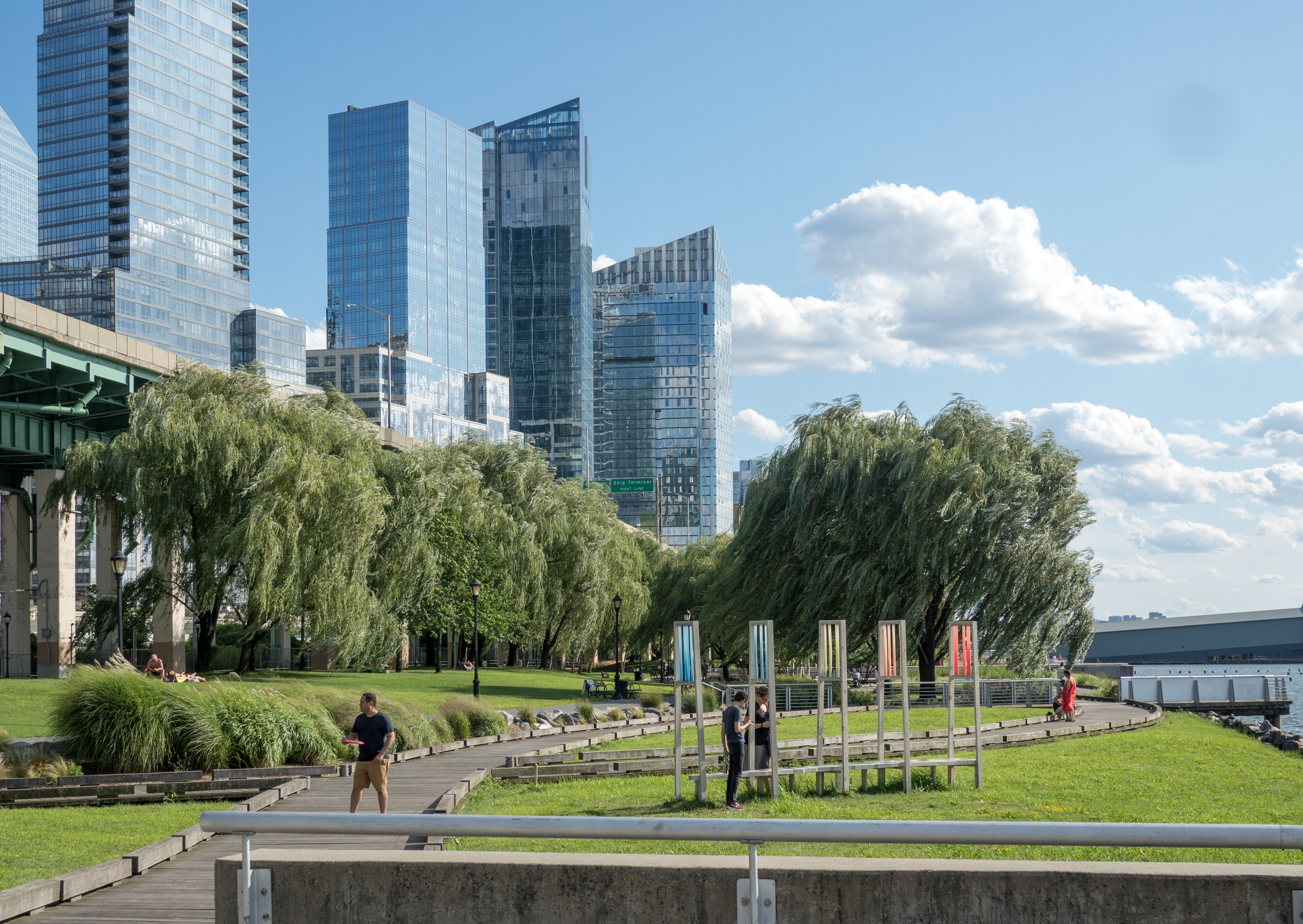
Southward view of the site from the riverside

The southernmost section of Riverside South, which had been set aside for television studios, needed to be rezoned before residential structures could be built there. In October 2008, Extell proposed constructing Riverside Center, a set of five mostly residential towers between 59th and 61st streets, to complete the development. Originally, Christian de Portzamparc was hired to design the buildings. Riverside Center, covering 3.1 million square feet (290,000 m^{2}), was modeled on the design of Battery Park City, with 2,500 residential units, retail, a cinema, a K-5 school, a hotel, and open space. The first site, known as site 2, would have contained 616 apartments and a school. Local residents quickly organized in opposition to the plans; among other things, they objected to the presence of 1,800 parking spaces and an automobile dealership. In mid-2010, Community Board 7 voted to recommend that the city government disapprove the plans for Riverside Center, and Manhattan borough president Scott Stringer also refused to accept the plans. In response, two lawyers and three lobbyists from Extell began negotiating with the city government. Extell agreed to add a school and affordable housing, cancel plans for a department store, and improve parks in the area.

The City Council approved Riverside Center's towers in December 2010 following a protracted dispute over the zoning. Extell hired Dattner Architects to design Riverside Center's school in 2011, Community Board 7 approved plans for the first Riverside Center building, occupying site 2, in August 2012. The Carlyle Group subsequently solicited bids for the development of the Riverside Center sites, inviting Extell to submit a bid. Dermot Realty Management Company won the bid to develop site 2, and the company bought the site in December 2012 for $70 million. Dermot also hired SLCE Architects to design the building at site 2, replacing de Portzamparc as the architect there. Silverstein Properties and El-Ad Group paid $160 million in 2013 for One West End Avenue, one of the five sites in the Riverside Center project. Silverstein and El-Ad's site became the One West End condominium building, while Dermot's site became the 21 West End Avenue rental building.

In 2014, Extell announced plans for the remaining three sites in Riverside Center. Extell never developed the remaining Riverside Center sites. General Investment and Development Companies (GID) bought the site at 400 West 61st Street in May 2015, and GID bought additional land at 20 Riverside Boulevard that November. GID bought the remaining tract at Riverside Center in December 2015. The project became Waterline Square, which was completed in 2020; the Waterline Square project includes three towers with 1,132 total units. Richard Meier & Partners, Kohn Pedersen Fox, and Rafael Viñoly designed the three Waterline Square towers.

==== 2010s to present ====
The Collegiate School agreed to move to Riverside South in 2013 and announced plans for a 10-story campus building at 301 Freedom Place South the next year. Extell began selling units at One Riverside Park in late 2013, and it subsequently opened a housing lottery for that building's affordable apartments. Silverstein and El Ad began selling the condos at One West End in 2015, and they also launched an affordable-housing lottery for that building. Dermot also began renting out units at 21 West End Avenue in 2016.

The first seven Riverside South buildings were originally known as Trump Place, and six of these buildings (excluding 240 Riverside Boulevard) contained large signs with that name on their facades. After Trump won the 2016 United States presidential election, the residents of 140, 160, and 180 Riverside Boulevard voted to remove the Trump Place signage from their respective structures. Many of these residents had been politically opposed to Trump and had signed petitions in favor of the removal of the Trump name. The Trump signage was removed from 200 Riverside Boulevard in October 2018 after that building's residents also voted to remove the signs. The Trump signage was also removed from the facade of 120 Riverside Boulevard in 2019; this was followed shortly afterward by the removal of Trump signage on 220 Riverside Boulevard, the final building in the complex that still bore the Trump Place name.

Riverside Park South's fifth phase opened in 2020. A&E Real Estate bought 140 Riverside Boulevard in 2022 for $266 million, and that firm paid another $415 million for 160 Riverside Boulevard the same year.

== Parks ==
=== Riverside Park South ===
External images
- Riverside Park South Interim Plan.
- Riverside Park South Final Plan.
- Riverside Park South without and with existing highway.

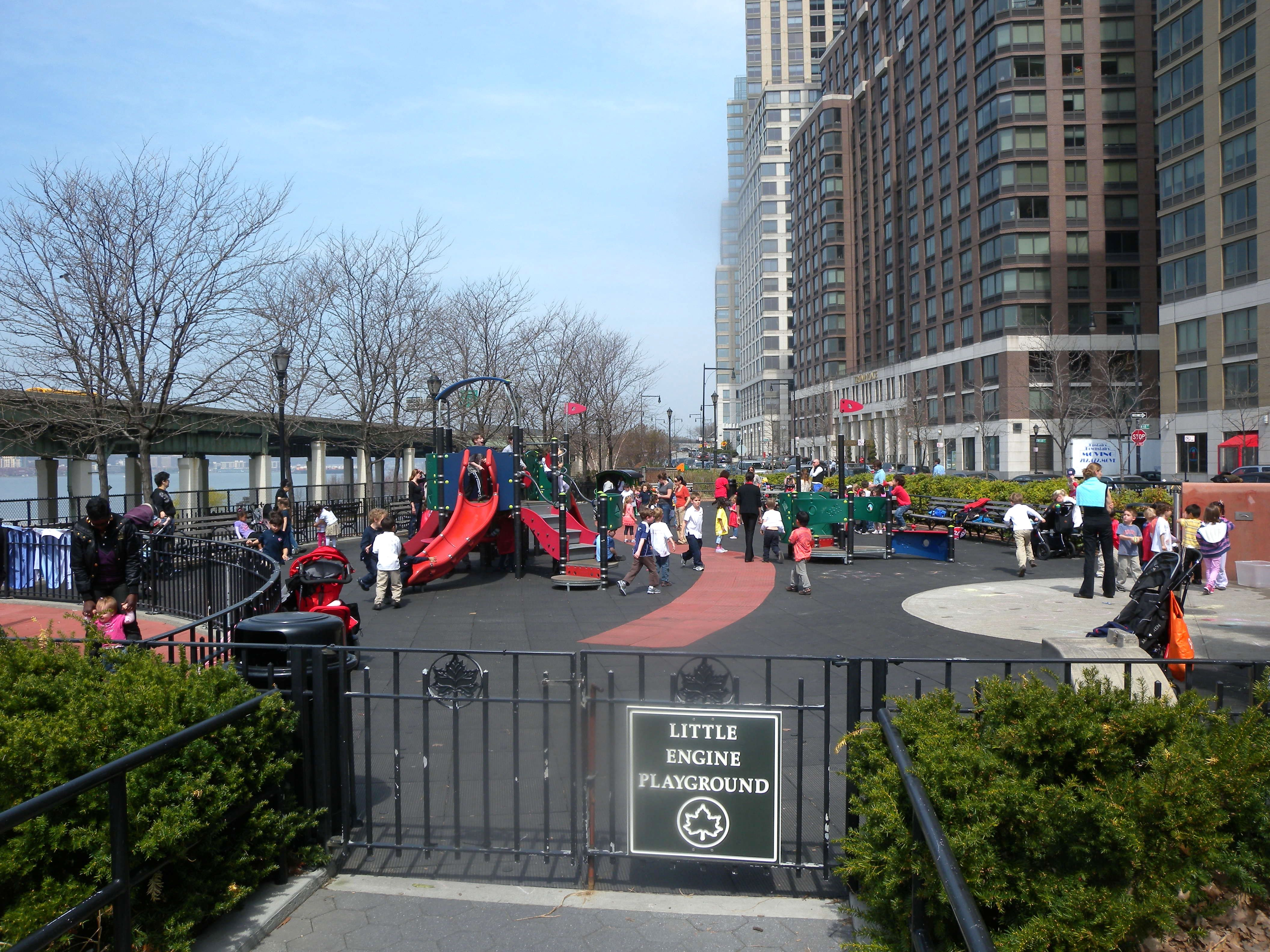
The Little Engine Playground in Riverside Park South

Park construction is funded by fees paid by Riverside South's residents. Phase 1, a 7-acre (2.8 ha) section from 72nd to 68th streets, was opened in April 2001. Pier I at 70th Street, part of the railyard, was rebuilt; it maintains its original length of 795 feet (242 m), but is narrower than originally, at 55 feet (17 m). Phase 2 comprises a waterfront section from 70th to 65th streets and opened in June 2003. It has two plazas at 66th and 68th streets, as well as a jagged waterfront. Phase 3, opened in August 2006, stretches from 65th to 62nd streets on the waterfront. Phase 4 opened in 2008 along the waterfront, extending from 63rd to 59th streets (overlapping with phase 3). A new mixed-use bikeway and walkway was also built under the highway, linking Hudson River Park with Riverside Park.

The design of phases 5 and 6, located east of the elevated highway viaduct, was tied to the fate of the highway relocation. The city had required that the first half of Riverside Boulevard be constructed on fill, while the second half was constructed on top of a new highway tunnel, changing park contours. Also there was pressure to add more recreational space. The park was subsequently redesigned so that the gently sloping broad lawn, that had been the centerpiece of the park, was eliminated and replaced with a flat space to be used for baseball fields. Playground features were added on the filled ground next to Riverside Boulevard.

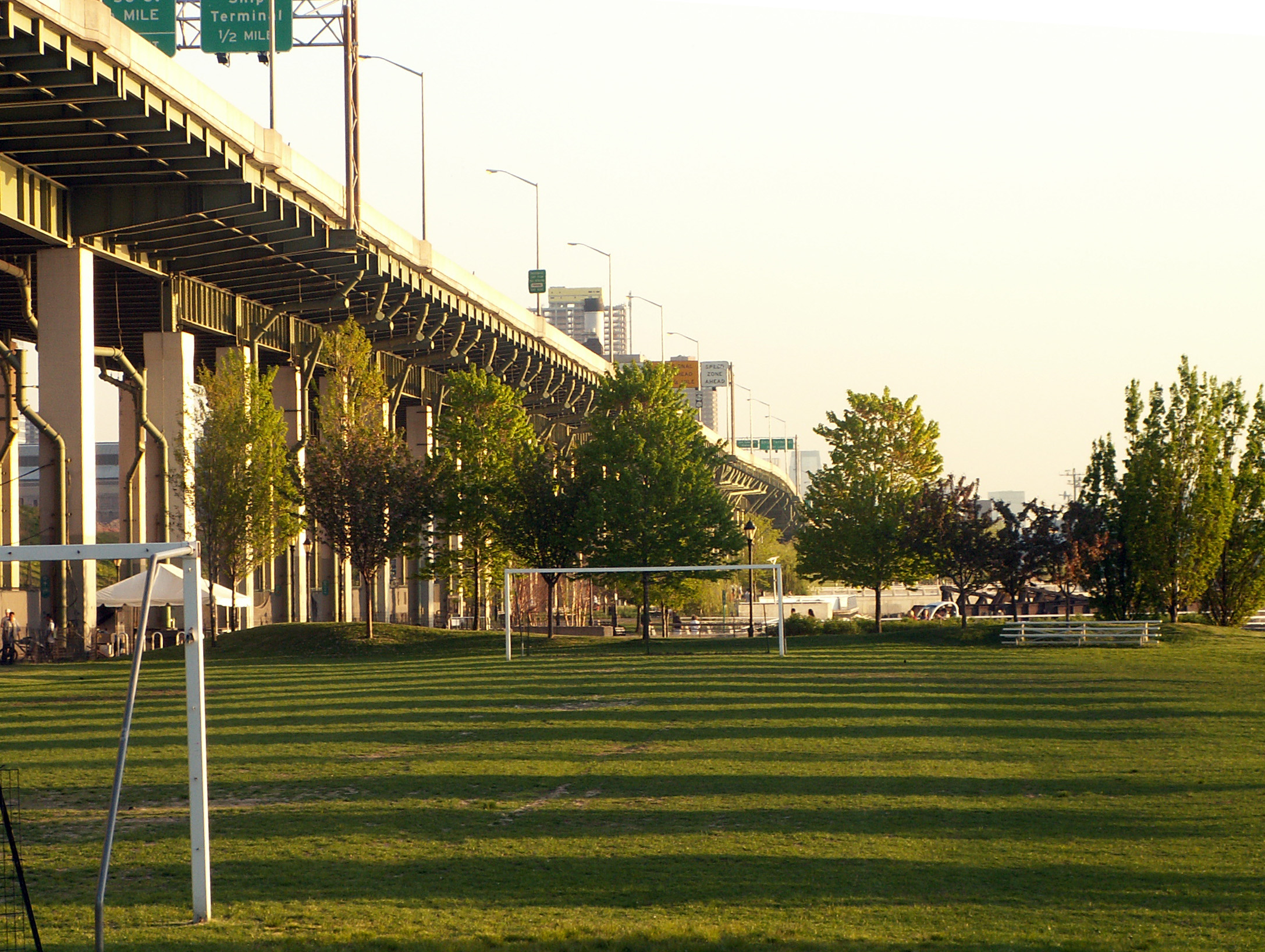
Soccer field at northern end of Riverside Park South

Relocating the highway will require some reconstruction of the park. A fifth phase of Riverside Park South opened in October 2020, encompassing the land east of the West Side Highway from 65th to 68th streets. The city plans to expand the park with new baseball and soccer fields, bikeways, lawns, picnic areas, and restrooms.

The park contains site-specific sculptures; railway ruins, gardens; a waterfront promenade; a walkway; and "Linda's Lawn" honoring Linda Davidoff, former president of The Parks Council, who organized the civic coalition that formulated the Riverside South plan. Portions of the former rail yard were incorporated into the new park. These include the New York Central Railroad 69th Street Transfer Bridge, which is listed on the National Register of Historic Places. As a reminder of the location's history, New York Central Railroad logos are engraved onto park benches. A wooden pier named Pier D was originally preserved as part of the park, but it was demolished in 2011 due to extreme deterioration.

=== Other parks ===
On West End Avenue, a privately owned park has a remnant of a stone wall as a remaining part of the embankment that dated to 1847. Construction workers had unearthed the stones during construction in 1994; some stones were salvaged for the new park during the four-day construction hiatus for archaeological excavation. There is also a private 3-acre (1.2 ha) park at One West End.

== Buildings ==
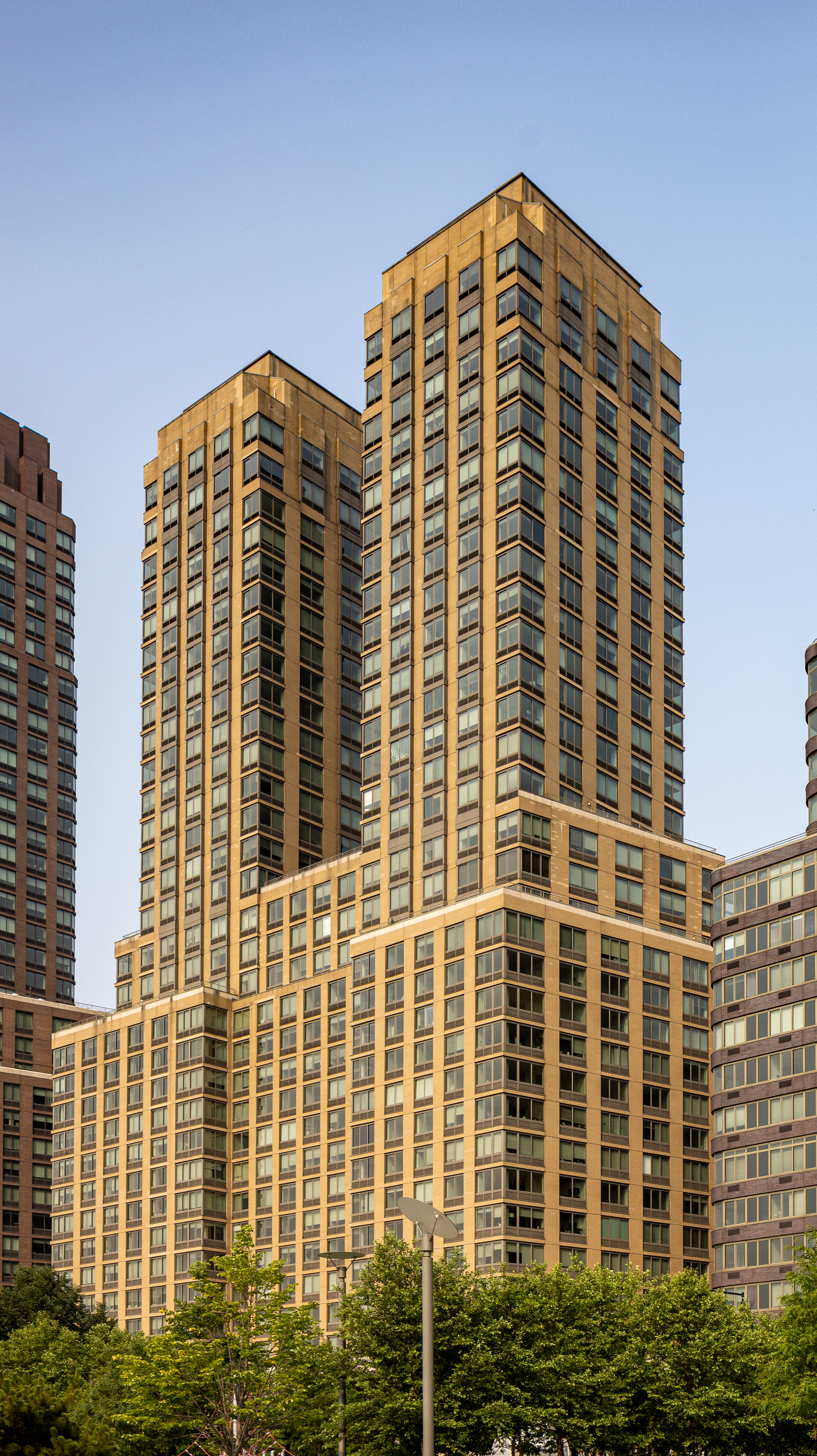
160 Riverside Boulevard, built in 1999.

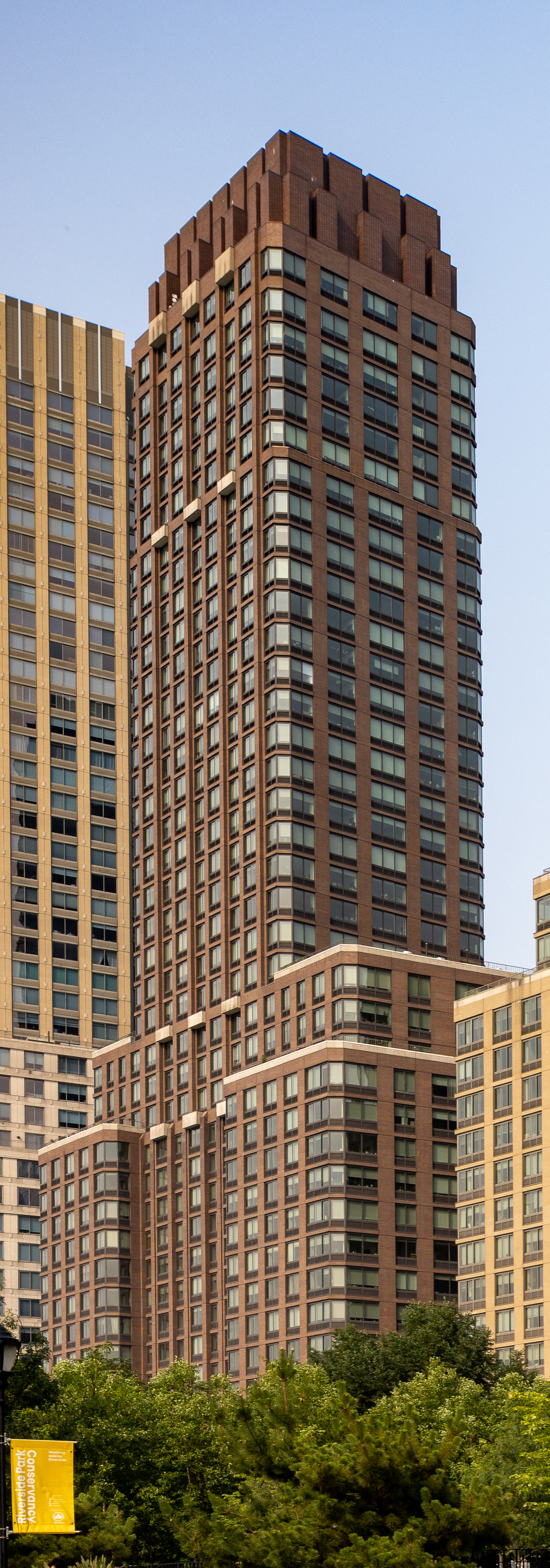
180 Riverside Boulevard, built in 1998.

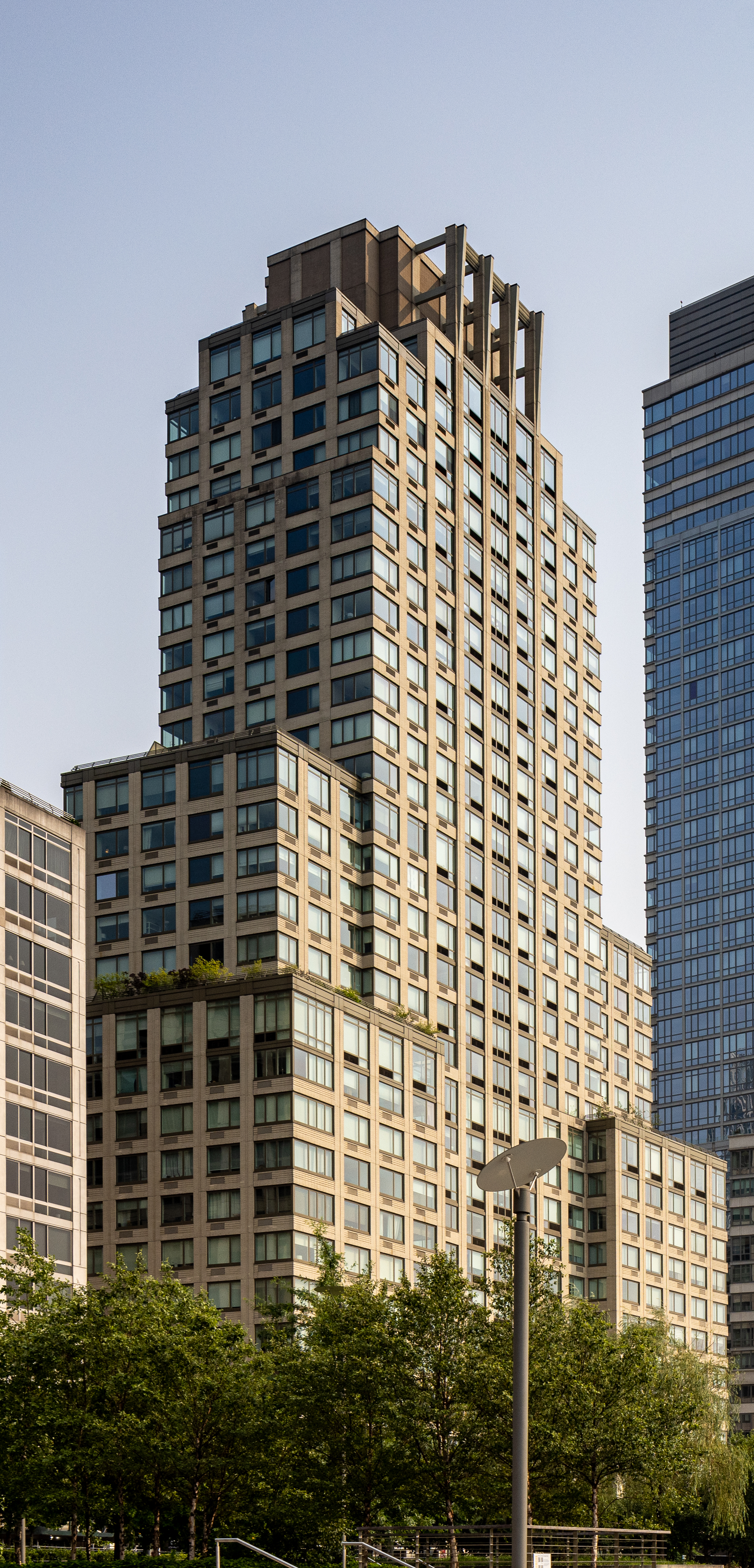
100 Riverside Boulevard, built in 2006.

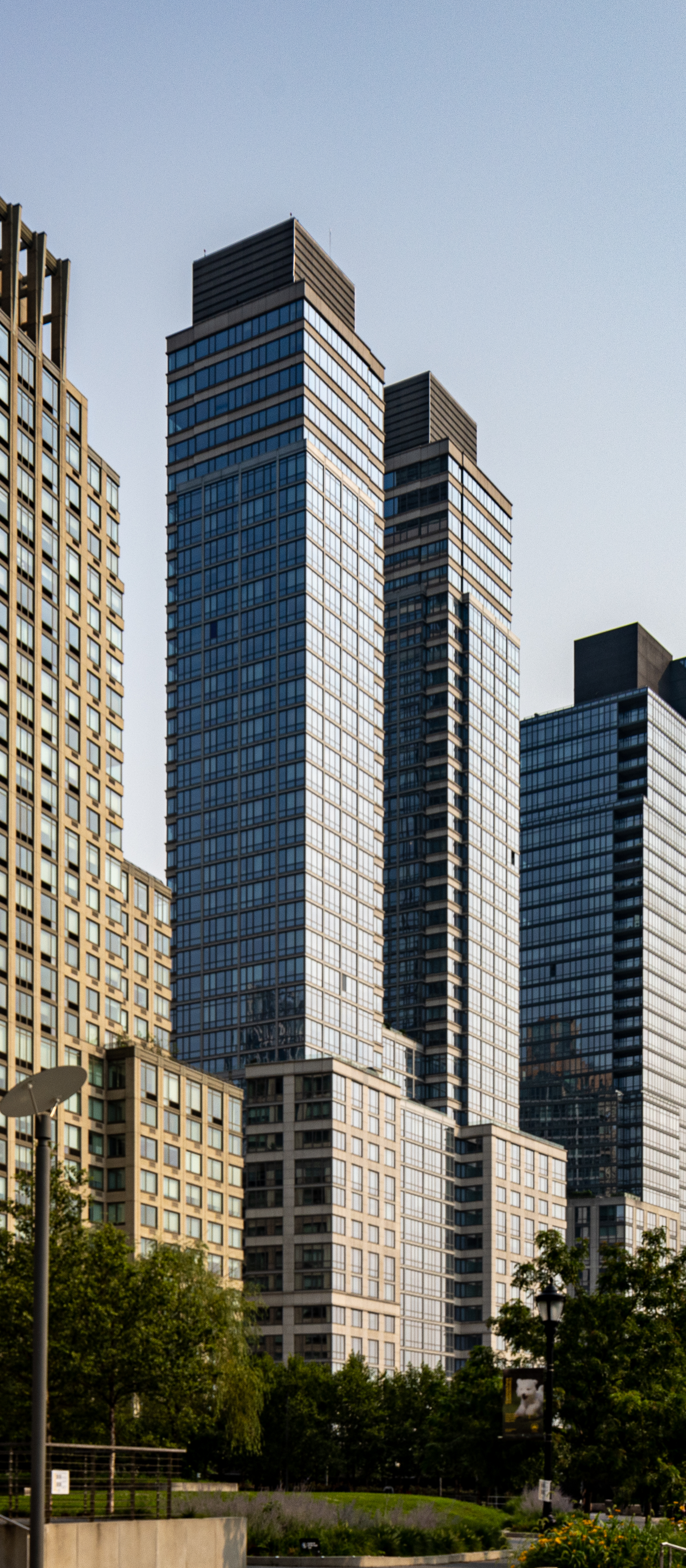
80 Riverside Boulevard, built in 2006.

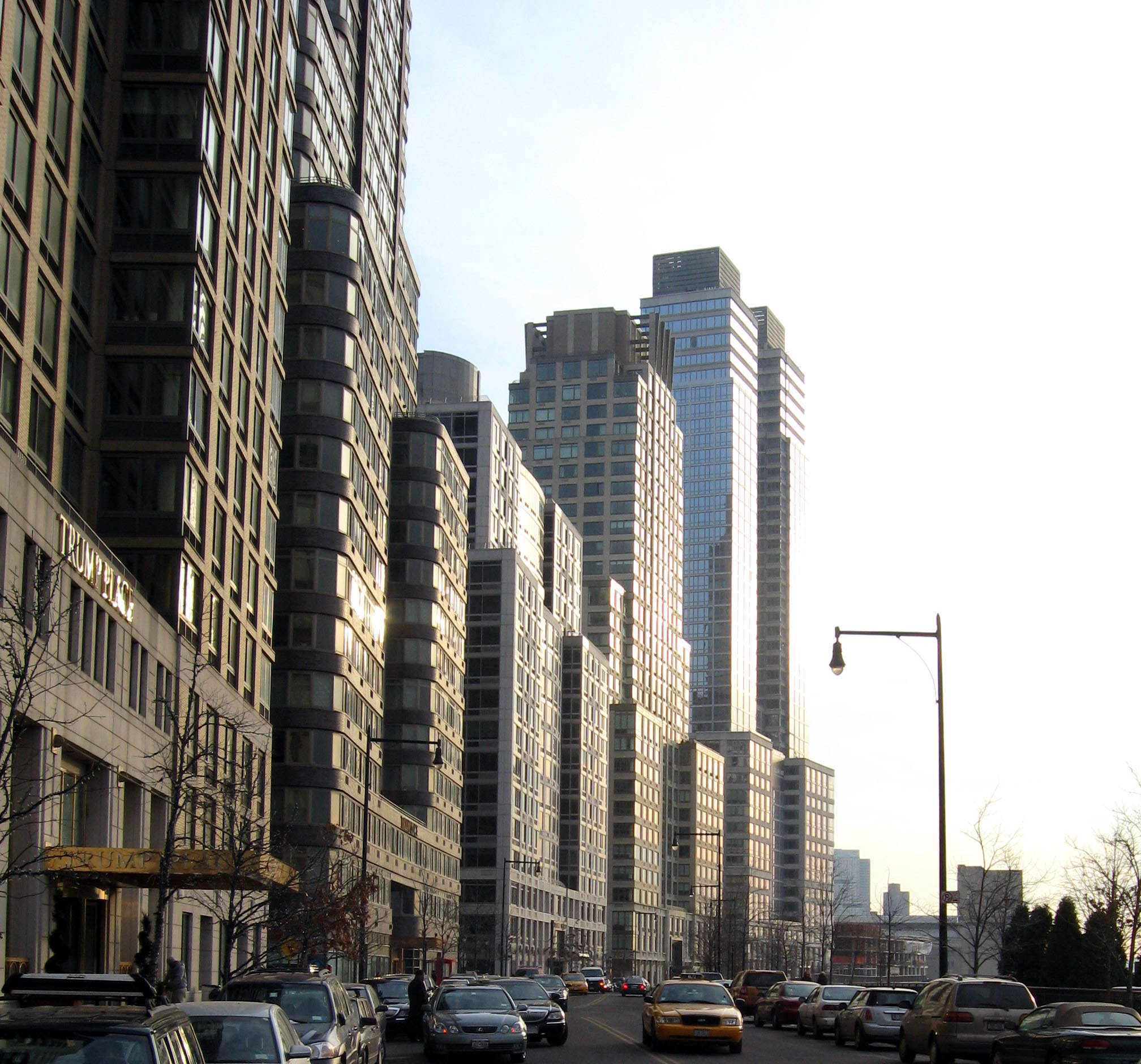
Street view of Riverside South buildings

Overall, the development consists of 19 apartment buildings, condominiums, and lease properties. As of 2012, the buildings housed a combined 8,000 people; the area was collectively called "Riverside Boulevard" after its main street, or "The Strip" after its long, narrow shape. Six more towers with a combined 3,000 units, as well as a school, a hotel, retail and restaurant space, and space for a movie theater, had yet to be completed. A 3.4-acre (1.4 ha) park between the buildings was in the planning stages. The towers were constructed as green buildings. Each structure's facade has a setback no higher than 125 to 150 feet (38 to 46 m) from the street; this was intended to reduce the buildings' visual impact.

Most living units in Riverside South are high-end housing, costing at least $2,000 per square foot (22,000/m^{2}). Per-foot real estate prices for Riverside South housing rose 66% from 2004 to 2014, compared with a 43% increase in real estate on the Upper West Side overall. For instance, baseball player Alex Rodriguez bought a 39th-floor Rushmore condominium for $5.5 million in March 2011, then sold it for $8 million in January 2012. At the same time, 12% to 20% of the units are designated as affordable, as required by the CPC approval of the project. Some buildings in the development, such as One Riverside Park, were controversial having separate entrances for affordable-housing residents, despite the legality of such "poor doors" in mixed-housing buildings.

=== Notable structures ===
Address / Name	Completion date	Height (ft/m)	Stories	Apartments	Notes/references
40 Riverside Boulevard / One Riverside Park	2015	375 feet (114 m)	33	219	
60 Riverside Boulevard / The Aldyn	2011	395 feet (120 m)	38	136	
80 Riverside Boulevard / The Rushmore	2008	425 feet (130 m)	41	271	
100 Riverside Boulevard / The Avery	2008	344 feet (105 m)	30	274	
120 Riverside Boulevard	2004	230 feet (70 m)	18	275	
140 Riverside Boulevard	2003	338 feet (103 m)	26	354	
160 Riverside Boulevard	2001	354 feet (108 m)	33	459	
180 Riverside Boulevard	1999	422 feet (129 m)	40	516	
200 Riverside Boulevard	2000	492 feet (150 m)	46	377	
220 Riverside Boulevard	2003	542 feet (165 m)	49	430	
240 Riverside Boulevard / The Heritage	2004	362 feet (110 m)	31	170	
1 Waterline Square	2019	429 feet (131 m)	36	272	
2 Waterline Square	2019	397 feet (121 m)	38	646	
3 Waterline Square	2019	391 feet (119 m)	34	244	
400 West 63rd Street / The Ashley	2010	—N/a	23	209	
1 West End Avenue / Riverside Center Building 5	2017	513 feet (156 m)	43	246	
21 West End Avenue / Riverside Center Building 2	2016	529 feet (161 m)	45	616	
75 West End Avenue / West End Towers	1995	404 feet (123 m)	39	1,000	
101 West End Avenue / Archstone	2000	370 feet (113 m)	33	503	

Trump and Hudson Waterfront Associates built the first seven buildings at Riverside South. Three additional buildings were completed by Extell: the Avery, the Rushmore, and the Aldyn. To attract families, Extell added various amenities to these three buildings, including playrooms, a bowling alley, a basketball court, and other sports facilities. The southern end of the development includes the 362-unit One West End condominium building, which includes amenities such as a cantilevered swimming pool. Next to One West End is a 616-unit rental building at 21 West End Avenue, which has a fitness center and basement pool.

== Other structures ==
Manhattan Community Board 7 members blamed Trump for failing to build the proposed enhancement and monument at Freedom Place, though the Riverside South Planning Corporation said that the Freedom Place plan was merely a concept for an arts program that was not included in the final project. A street called Freedom Place South, along the same axis as Freedom Place, runs southward from 64th to 59th streets. In addition, there is a tunnel underneath a portion of Riverside Boulevard between 61st and 65th streets, which is intended to carry traffic from the West Side Highway. The tunnel measures approximately 0.8 miles (1.3 km) long and 40 feet (12 m) wide. The Metro-North Railroad sought a station on the West Side Line at Riverside South as part of the Penn Station Access project. However, the idea was abandoned in 2010 because the foundations of Riverside South's buildings had been built too close to the tracks and because demand at that location was uncertain.

The IRT Powerhouse, located just south of Riverside South, was designed by Stanford White for the Interborough Rapid Transit Company and is a New York City designated landmark. Adjacent to the Powerhouse is a tetrahedron-shaped building known as VIA 57 West, which was designed by Bjarke Ingels Group. In addition, the Abraham Joshua Heschel School is located on West End Avenue next to Riverside South.
