= Waterline Square =

Residential skyscrapers in Manhattan, New York

Coordinates: 40°46′23″N 73°59′29″W

One Waterline Square
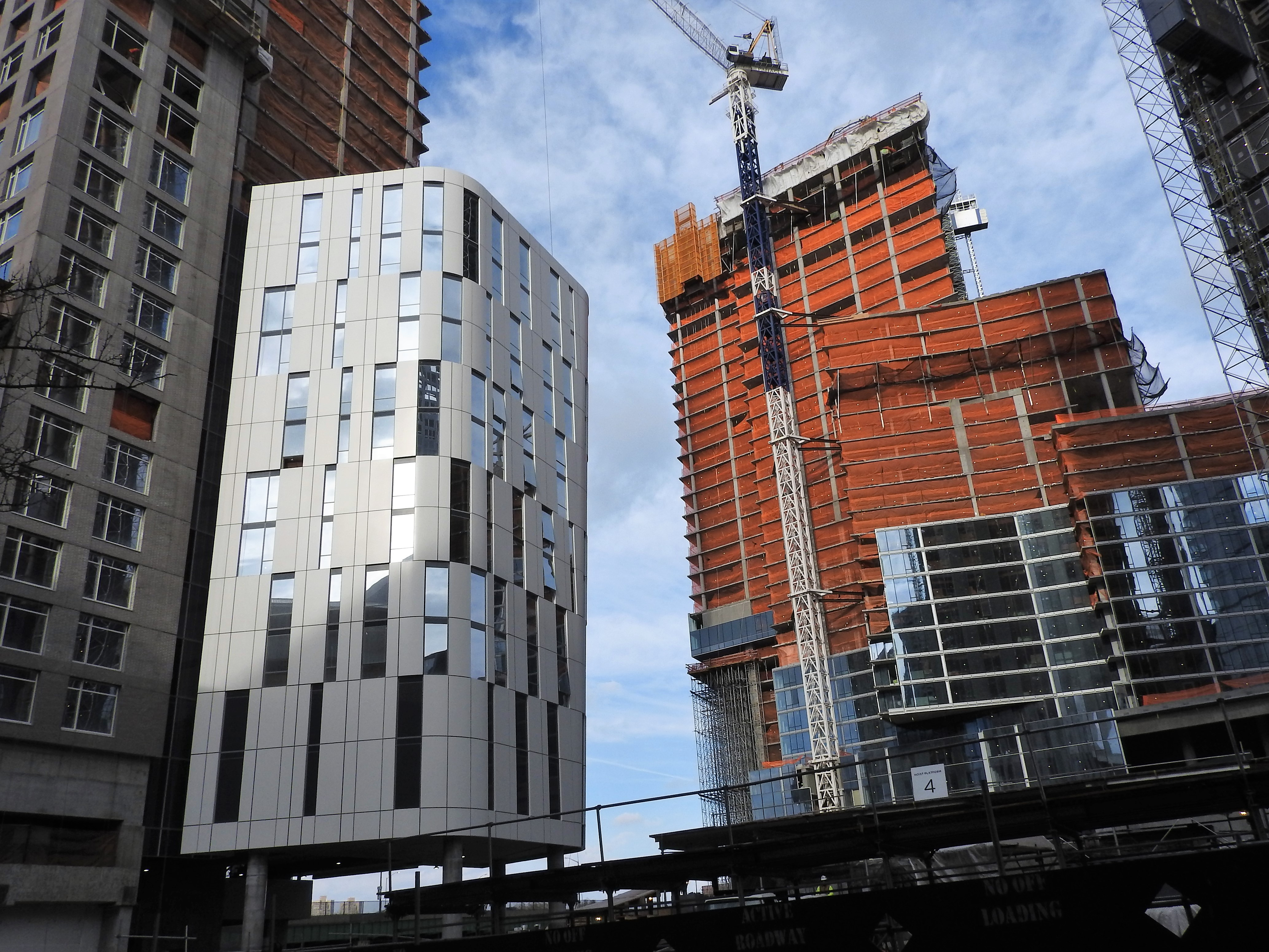
- One Waterline Square under construction on the left in February 2018
- Interactive map of the One Waterline Square area

General information
- Status: Completed
- Location: 10 Riverside Boulevard, Manhattan New York 10019-10023, United States
- Construction started: 2016
- Completed: 2020

Height
- Height: 429 feet (131 m)

Technical details
- Floor count: 36
- Floor area: 527,981 square feet (49,051.0 m^{2})

Design and construction
- Architects: Richard Meier, Christian de Portzamparc (Master Planner)
- Developer: General Investment and Development Companies (GID)

Two Waterline Square
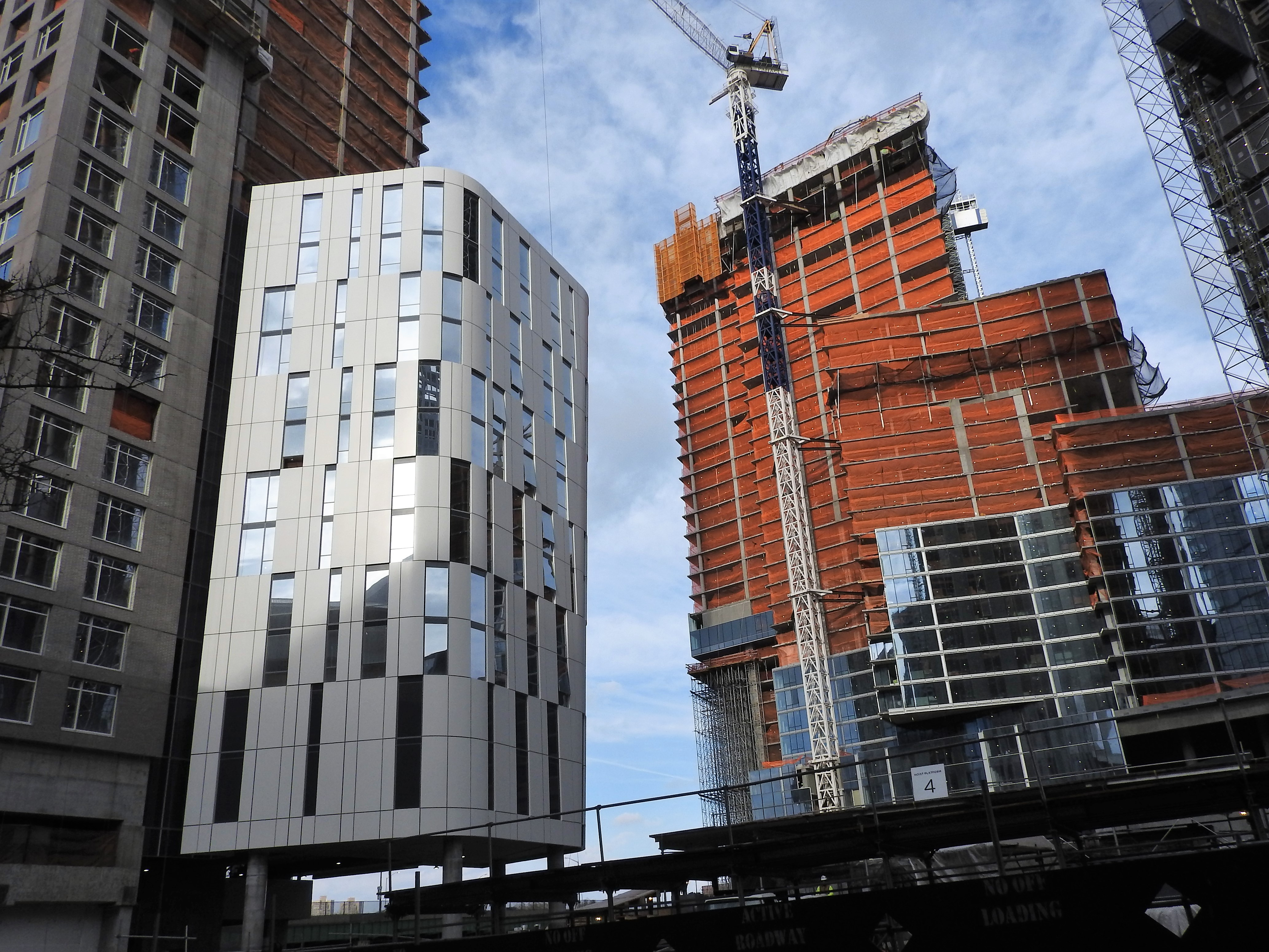
- Two Waterline Square under construction on the right in February 2018
- Interactive map of the Two Waterline Square area

General information
- Status: Completed
- Location: 400 West 61st Street, Manhattan New York NY 10019-10023, United States
- Construction started: 2016
- Completed: 2020

Height
- Height: 397 feet (121 m)

Technical details
- Floor count: 38
- Floor area: 1,122,213 square feet (104,257.0 m^{2})

Design and construction
- Architects: Kohn Pedersen Fox, Christian de Portzamparc (Master Planner)
- Developer: General Investment and Development Companies (GID)

Three Waterline Square
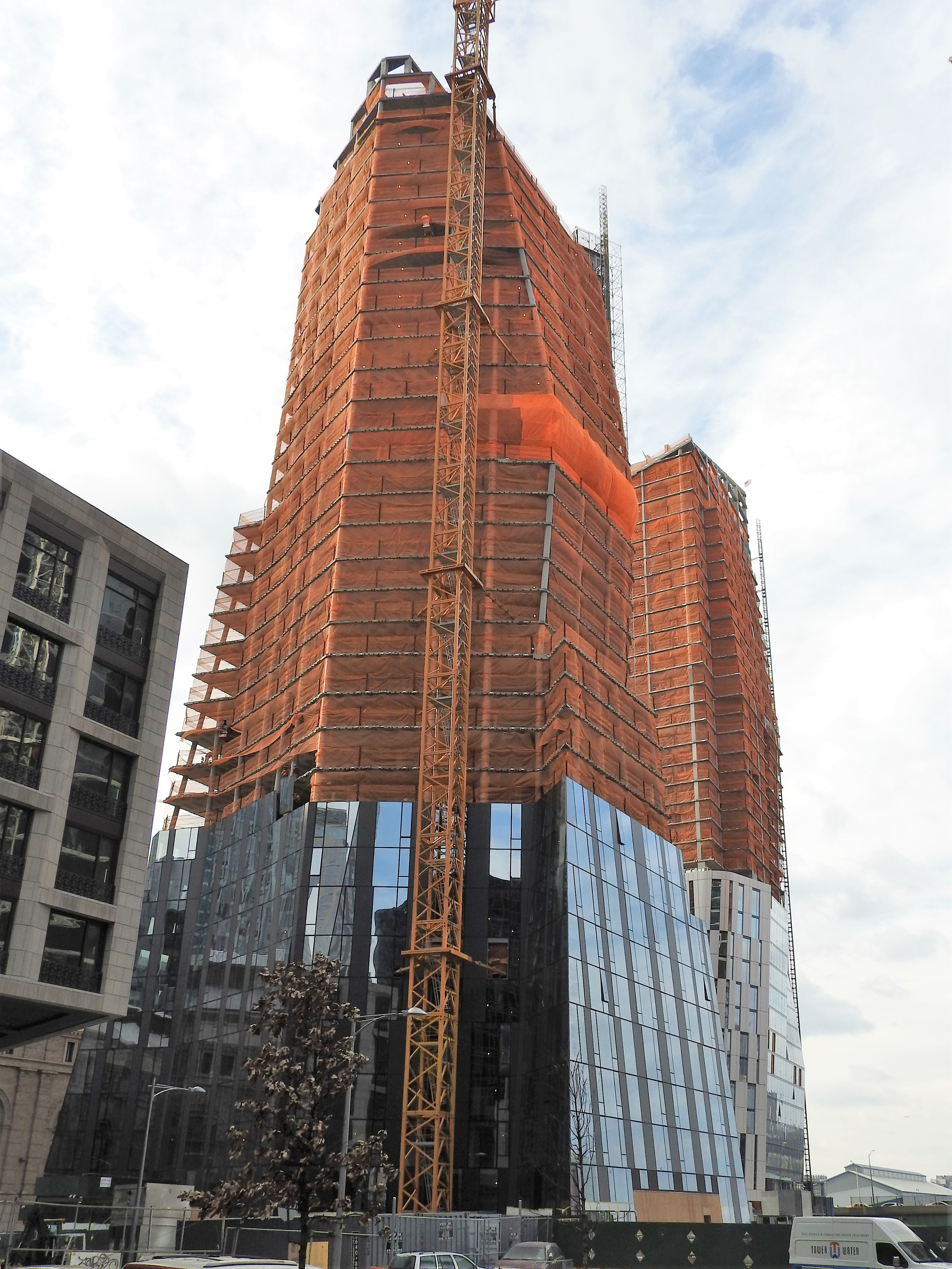
- Three Waterline Square under construction in February 2018
- Interactive map of the Three Waterline Square area

General information
- Status: Completed
- Location: 639 West 59th Street, Manhattan New York NY 10019-10023, United States
- Construction started: 2016
- Completed: 2020

Height
- Height: 391 feet (119 m)

Technical details
- Floor count: 34
- Floor area: 443,204 square feet (41,175.0 m^{2})

Design and construction
- Architects: Rafael Viñoly, Christian de Portzamparc (Master Planner)
- Developer: General Investment and Development Companies (GID)

Waterline Square is a 5-acre (2.0 ha), $2.3 billion luxury condominium and rental development near the Hudson River on the Upper West Side of Manhattan in New York City. The complex includes three residential towers with 1,132 units and 3 acres (1.2 ha) of park, along with 100,000 square feet (9,300 m^{2}) of amenity space. The residences range in size from one to five bedrooms.

The project, which was designed by Rafael Viñoly, Kohn Pedersen Fox, and Richard Meier, was completed in 2020.

== History ==
=== Riverside Center ===
The site was originally part of the Riverside South development and would be the last phase, known as Riverside Center. Extell Development Company originally planned to build 2,500 residential and condo units, 140,000 square feet (13,000 m^{2}) of retail and a cinema, a K-5 school for 750 students, a 250-room hotel, 3.2 acres of publicly accessible open space, and 1,500 parking spaces. Despite public opposition, the plan was unanimously approved by the New York City Council in December 2010.

The plan, which involved design by Christian de Portzamparc, were never realized and the company sold the land to GID for $676 million in 2015.

=== Waterline Square ===
In November 2016, GID received $1.243 billion in construction financing from a consortium of lenders including Wells Fargo, HSBC, JPMorgan Chase and the National Bank of Abu Dhabi. The financing represented one of the largest construction loans ever in New York City and came at a time when financing for condominium projects had been difficult to obtain.

By November 2016, most of the site's foundations were complete. As of April 2017, the buildings on the site began rising above street level. In June 2017, Cipriani S.A. signed a 28,000-square-foot (2,600 m^{2}) lease, with plans to open a food market with several restaurants and stalls. Sales for the condominiums began the same month, with a projected sellout of $1.15 billion and an average price of $4.4 million. The development topped out during December 2017.

The project was named New York City's fastest-selling condominium development in February 2018 by Architectural Digest, having sold 53 units worth over $200 million in just six months. Applications for the affordable housing units opened in October 2018 and were available until December 2018. The project was completed in June 2020. Cipriani began operating its food hall at Waterline Square, Harry's Table, in mid-2022.

== Architecture ==
In total, the project offers 1,132 units, split between 226 affordable apartments, 263 condominiums, and 643 market-rate apartments. In each building, the condominiums begin at the 20th floor and the rental units occupy the lower floors. Each building features separate entrances for the condo and rental sections. All the units feature high-end finishes and appliances from brands like Gaggenau Hausgeräte, Valli & Valli, and Dornbracht.

The developers took the unusual step of hiring a different architect and a different interior designer for each building. Architectural firms Richard Meier & Partners, Kohn Pedersen Fox, and Rafael Viñoly respectively designed One, Two, and Three Waterline Square. James Linsley, president of GID, described the buildings as "almost like cousins...They communicate with each other architecturally."

=== One Waterline Square ===
One Waterline Square contains 272 units, split between 56 condos and 216 rentals. The interiors of the units were designed by Champalimaud Design in either white or natural finishes. The building's defining feature is a 12-story, sail-shaped facade extension above the building's entrance in the northeast corner. The building's main facade is composed of clear reflective glass designed to interact with the Hudson River. However, the west facade is composed of gray brick as a tribute to the historic brick-clad IRT Powerhouse adjacent to the building. The same side of the building features a porte-cochère entrance from 59th Street for condominium owners.

=== Two Waterline Square ===
The largest building, Two Waterline Square contains 160 condos and 216 rental apartments, totaling 646 units. The interiors of the units were designed by Yabu Pushelberg. The building features several broken-up masses designed to minimize the impact of the large building. The largest section of the building faces west towards the Hudson River to maximize views and light.

=== Three Waterline Square ===
The smallest building, Three Waterline Square contains just 47 condos and 167 rentals for a total of 244 units. The interiors of the units were designed by Groves & Co. with marble and wood to reflect a contemporary theme. The building has a “netted” façade with uneven banding that provides texture.

=== Amenities and public areas ===
All Waterline Square buildings are connected to the Waterline Club, a 100,000-square-foot (9,300 m^{2}), three-story amenity center in the space between the three buildings, designed by the Rockwell Group. Amenities include a tennis court, lap pool, spa, basketball court, indoor soccer field, squash court, a 30-foot (9.1 m) rock climbing wall, skate park and golf simulator. Additionally, each individual building contains amenities centers with facilities such as outdoor decks, demonstration kitchens, dining rooms, and lounges. Cipriani operates a 28,000-square-foot (2,600 m^{2}) food market at the base of the development.

Atop the amenities center sits a 2.6-acre (1.1 ha) park designed by Mathews Nielsen Landscape Architects, dubbed Waterline Square Park. The park features tree-lined groves, open grass areas, walking paths, a playground, fountains, and other water features.

== Reception ==
Carter Horsley, writing in City Realty, described the project as three "rather ungainly and completely dissimilar" towers. Ondel Hylton, also writing for City Realty, called the buildings' architecture "angular and somewhat tortured deconstructivist forms."

Horsley described Three Waterline Square as "not pristine but at least dramatically interesting with its bold façades" and "the most attractive" of the three buildings. In comparison, he described the other two buildings as "rather awkward." However, Hylton called the building "drunkenly pinstriped."

Curbed New York included the Waterline Club amenity center on its list of "The most outrageous amenities at NYC apartments in 2017" for its sheer size and scope. Justin Davidson of Curbed wrote of Waterline Square Park in 2022: "Finally, at least some West Siders got a better outcome than just the compromises that their ancestors negotiated."
