= West Side Elevated Highway =

Former highway in Manhattan, New York

West Side Elevated Highway
- New York State Route 9A
- Approximate trace of the elevated highway at its greatest extent

Route information
- Maintained by NYCDOT
- Status: Replaced with surface boulevard
- Existed: 1929–1973

Major junctions
- South end: I-478 / FDR Drive / Battery Place in Battery Park City
- North end: Henry Hudson Parkway in Hell's Kitchen

Location
- Country: United States
- State: New York

Highway system
- New York Highways; Interstate; US; State; Reference; Parkways

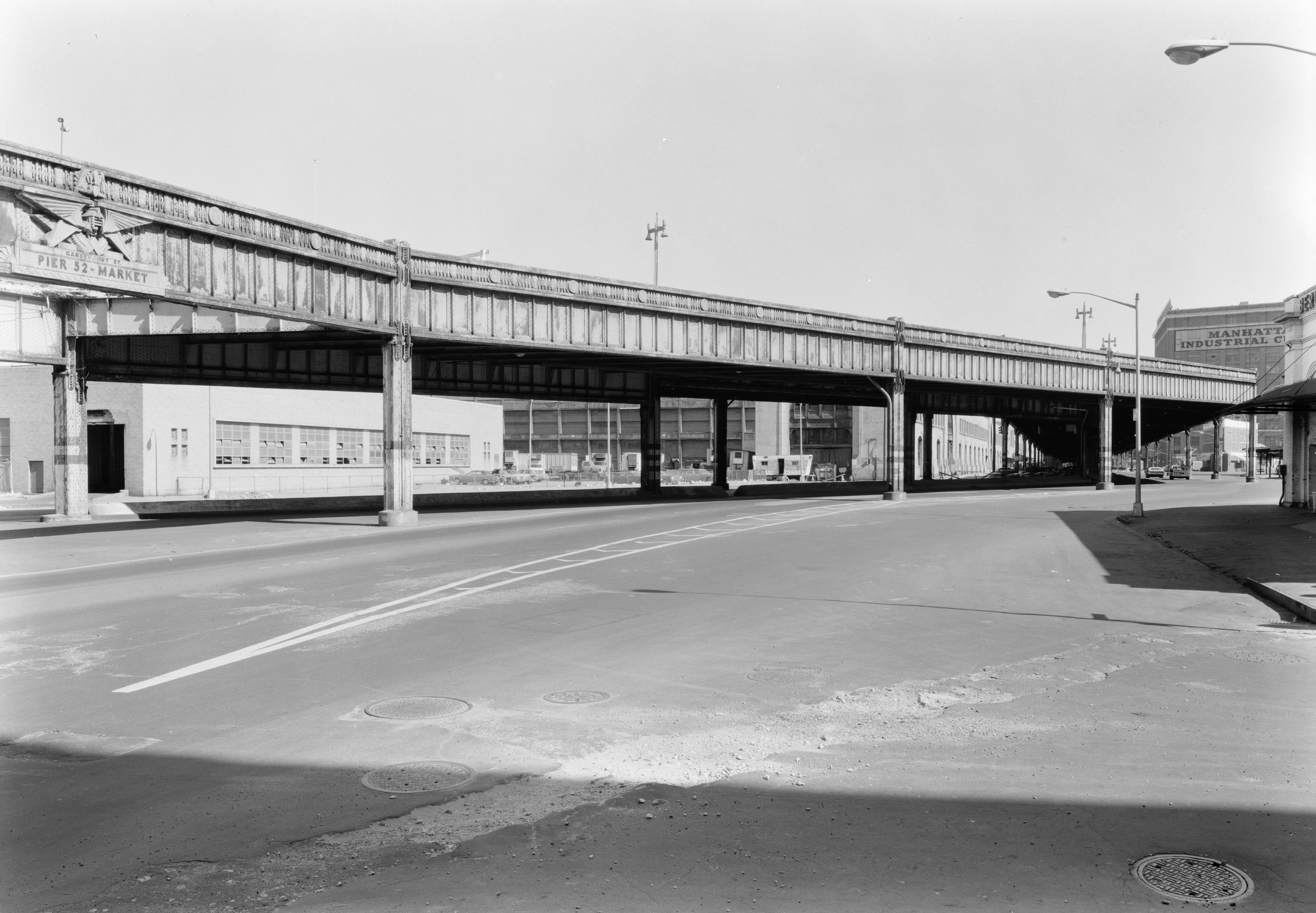
West Side Highway looking north at Gansevoort Street. The collapsed section (removed) is shown at left behind frieze.

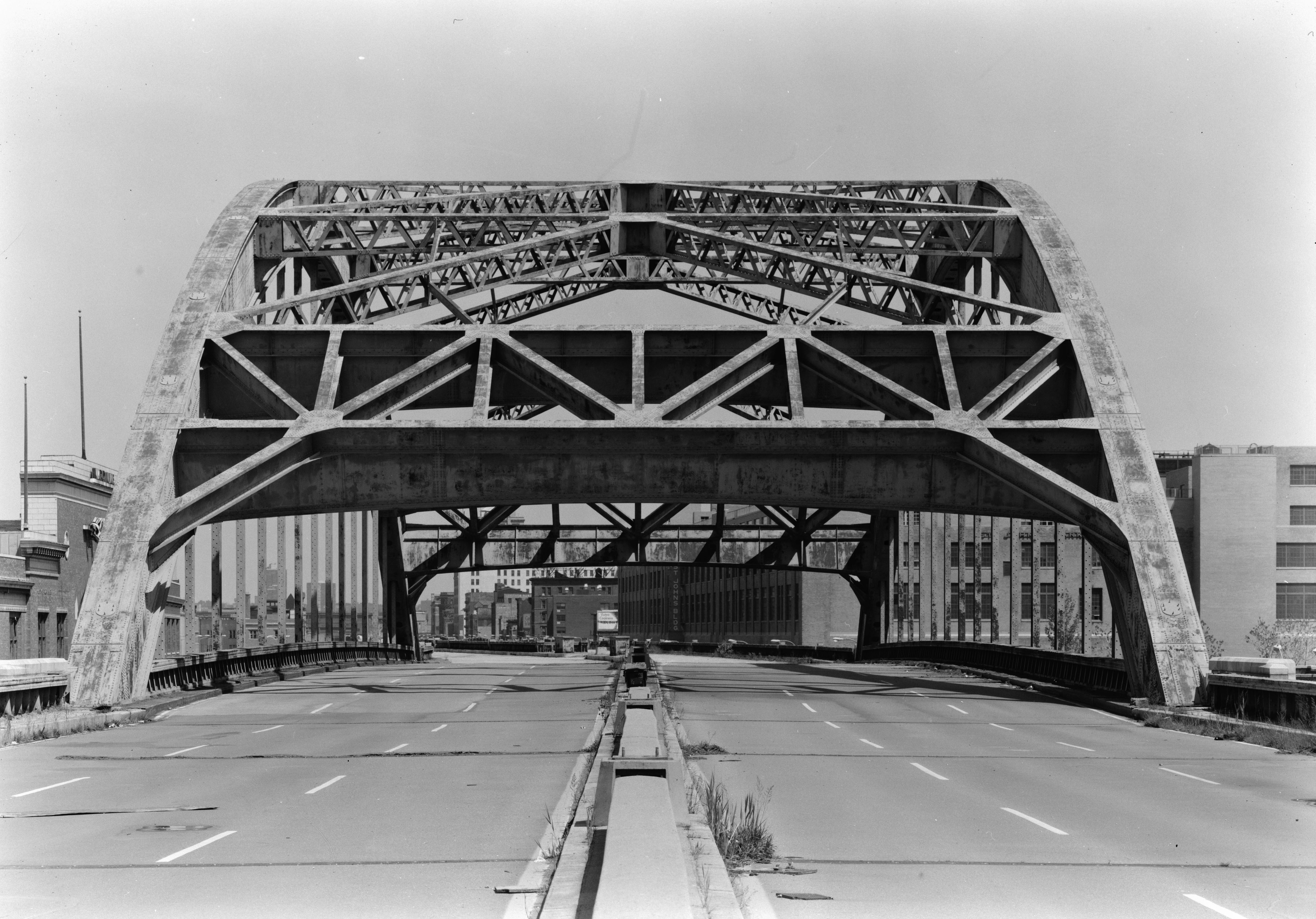
Looking north at Canal Street

The West Side Elevated Highway (West Side Highway or Miller Highway, named for Julius Miller, Manhattan borough president from 1922 to 1930) was an elevated section of New York State Route 9A (NY 9A) running along the Hudson River in the New York City borough of Manhattan to the tip of the island. It was an elevated highway, one of the first urban freeways in the world, and served as a prototype for urban freeways elsewhere, including Boston's Central Artery.

Built between 1929 and 1951, the highway had narrow confines—which could not accommodate trucks—and sharp S exit ramps that made it obsolete almost immediately. Maintenance was minimal, and the use of corrosive salts to de-ice the highway in winter accelerated its decay. When chunks of its facade began to fall off due to lack of maintenance, and a truck and car fell through it at 14th Street in 1973, the highway was shut down, and a debate began over whether to renovate it or dismantle it. Attitudes to urban planning had changed in the intervening decades, and the decision was made not to repair the decaying structure.

The need to replace the deteriorating highway was recognized in the 1950s. Plans were drafted, but not executed. By 1971, a plan evolved for the elevated highway to be replaced by an underground interstate-quality highway, which came to be called Westway. It received approval from many levels of government, from the city to the federal, but was scuttled in 1985 owing to environmental issues. In the time between the closure of the elevated highway and the completion of its dismantling, while debate about Westway was proceeding, remaining sections of the old highway structure began to be unofficially utilized as an elevated urban park, for jogging and bicycling.

By 1989, the old elevated highway structure was totally dismantled except for a small portion from 59th Street to 72nd Street, which, in effect, became the southern extension of the Henry Hudson Parkway. Eventually, a grade-level six lane "urban boulevard" was built, which is generally referred to as the West Side Highway, although the elements of it use the names of the surface streets which existed before the elevated highway was built: West Street, Eleventh Avenue and Twelfth Avenue. It connects to the remaining elevated structure via a ramp at 57th Street.

== Early planning ==
=== Death Avenue ===
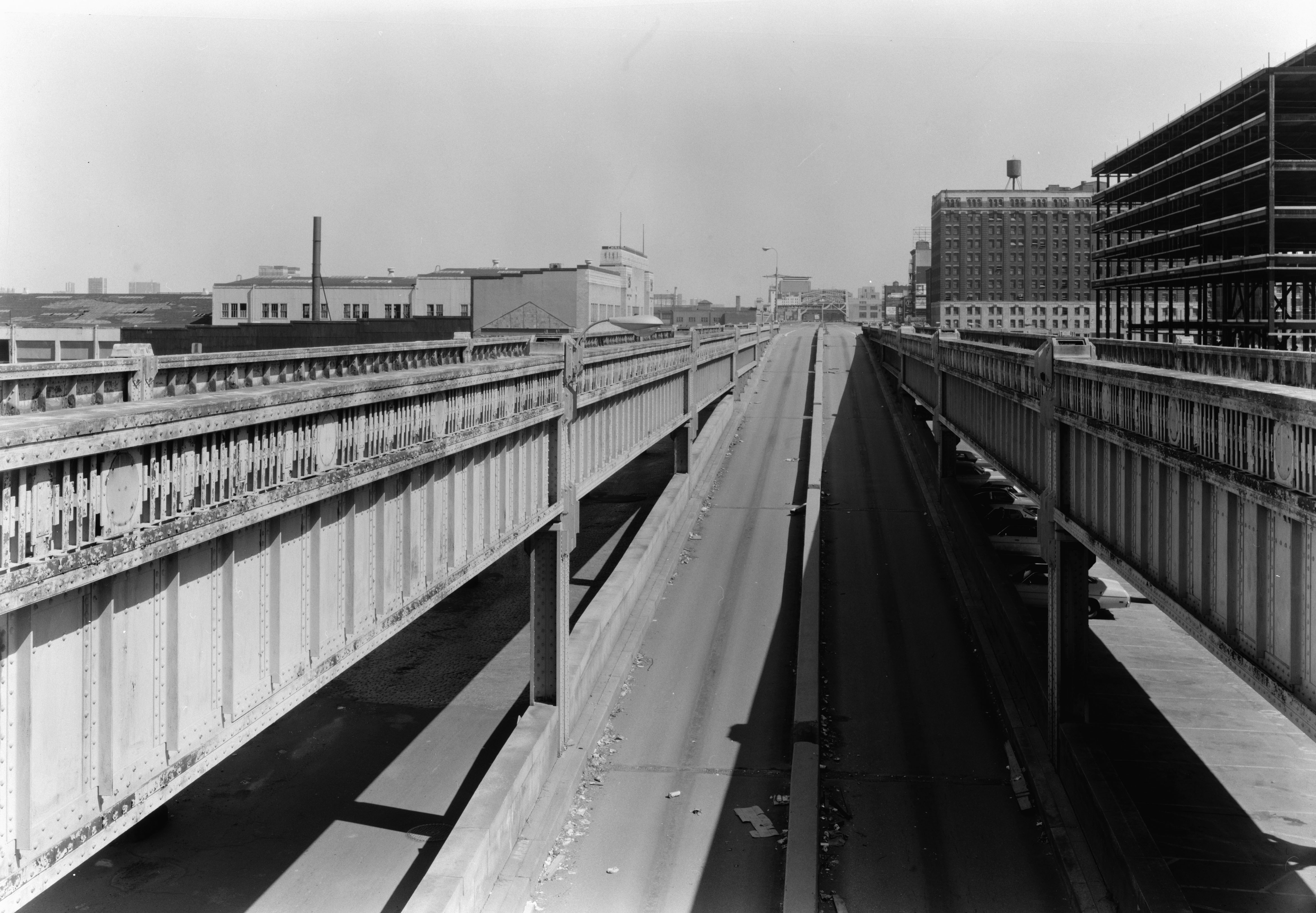
Former elevated highway, looking north at the Chambers Street ramps

Before the West Side Highway was built, the road along the Hudson River was busy, with significant cross traffic going to docks and ferries. At 22nd Street, most traffic continued north along Eleventh Avenue, along which the New York Central Railroad (NYCRR)'s West Side Line ran; it was known by many as "Death Avenue" for the many crashes caused by trains and automobiles colliding.

The first official proposal for an elevated highway along Manhattan's west side was made by Police Commissioner Richard Edward Enright on January 12, 1924, in a letter to the New York City Board of Estimate. The highway was to be 100 feet (30 m) wide, running north from the Battery to 72nd Street at Riverside Drive, West End Avenue, or Amsterdam Avenue. According to Enright, "During business hours West Street [was] the most congested thoroughfare in the city. Vast quantities of the city's foodstuffs [were] handled in the territory adjacent to West Street." He cited traffic congestion as an extra cost of doing business and a blockage for fire engines.

=== Plans for the new highway ===
==== Double-decker railroad/highway proposal ====
On February 2, 1925, it was announced that the railroad would build a combined double-decker elevated highway and freight railroad (with the highway above the railroad) for $24 million at no cost to the city. At the time, Eleventh Avenue was popularly known as "Death Avenue" owing to the dangers of the surface line. The elevated structure would eliminate 106 grade crossings over 84 blocks. The proposal came about after six months of negotiations between Manhattan Borough President Julius Miller and the NYCRR. The planned highway would no longer go to the Battery, instead ending at Canal Street, meeting the Holland Tunnel (which would open to traffic on November 13, 1927). The northern terminus was set at 72nd Street and Riverside Drive. Ramps were planned at Canal Street, 23rd Street, Riverside Drive, and at least two other locations.

The Port of New York Authority opposed the plan, preferring a more forward-looking comprehensive freight distribution plan. They attacked Miller as trying to push the plan through without input from the Port Authority. The Port Authority wanted a system of inland terminals and belt-line railroads. According to Port Authority Chairman Julian Gregory, it was almost certain that NYCRR would not go along with the Port Authority plan. It was also believed that giving NYCRR elevated tracks on the west side would allow the railroad to monopolize freight and raise prices. The Port Authority believed it was primarily a freight problem, but NYCRR and New York City considered it to be a grade-crossing elimination project.

Miller responded by arguing that something had to be done right away. He said that if the Port Authority could put forward a comprehensive plan within five years, he would put his full support behind it. He also pointed out that his plan was only one part of his "comprehensive plan for the relief of traffic congestion"; he had already widened many avenues and removed several Midtown elevated railroad spurs. He said the plan would not give the NYCRR any rights they did not already have; it was merely a relocation of existing tracks. The tracks had been on the surface for 55 years despite legal action taken against them, and Miller claimed they would be there for another 50 if nothing were done. Miller also received a letter from NYCRR Vice President Ira Place, stating that the railroad would reduce freight rates if the new elevated structure were built.

==== Miller's elevated single-deck highway ====
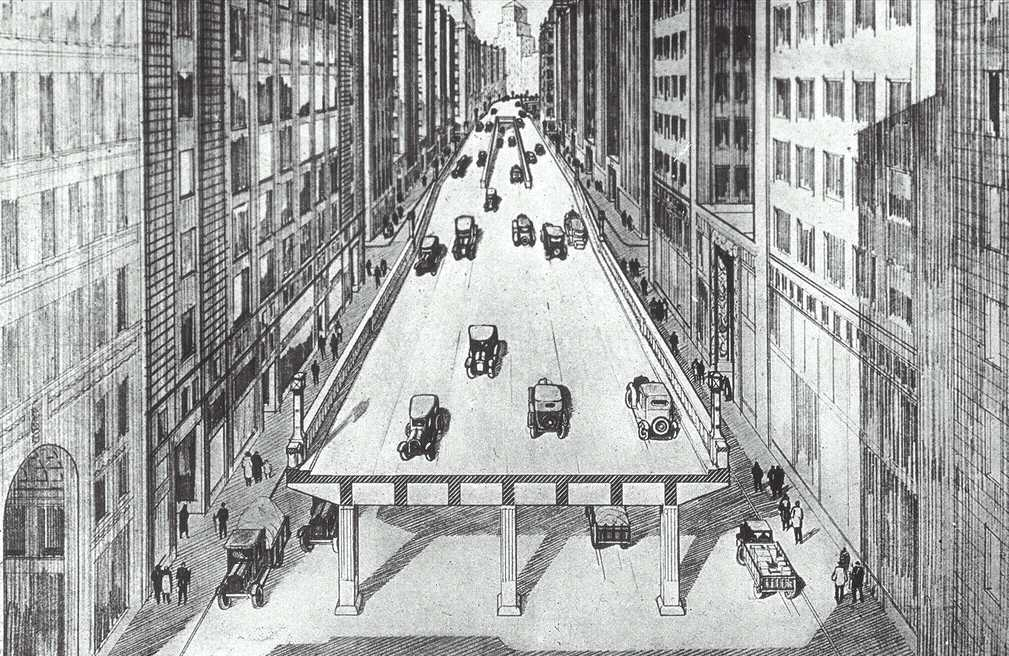
A plan for Boston's Central Artery, based on the West Side Highway

On January 20, 1926, borough president Miller sent a plan for an $11 million elevated highway to be built completely on city property to the Board of Estimate. The elevated railroad was removed from the plan, since NYCRR had come up with a separate project for partially elevating and depressing their railroad (now known as the High Line). According to Miller, there were questions over who would own and maintain the dual structure. There were also objections to its height of 40 feet (12 m) and its placement at the east building line of the existing surface roads. The elevated highway was to connect to a planned parkway (now the Henry Hudson Parkway) at 72nd Street, forming a highway free from cross traffic stretching from Canal Street to 129th Street. The elevated road was to be 60 feet (18 m) wide, wide enough for six lanes of traffic; the existing surface road would carry local traffic beneath the highway. Ramps would be provided at Canal Street, Christopher Street, 14th Street, 23rd Street, 34th Street, 42nd Street, and 57th Street. Slow-moving traffic would use the left lanes, due to the left-hand ramps. This contrasts with the current method of using the left lane for passing and putting ramps on the right side, and to the method popular around the 1950s of putting ramps on whichever side was easier. The highway would "carry buses that will make both its conveniences and its beauties available to the general public", according to Miller. He suggested Hudson River Boulevard for the name of the highway.

On April 24, 1925, Governor Al Smith signed a bill authorizing the construction of the highway. Funds for the $11 million highway were to be procured by property assessments along the route; this was considered reasonable due to advantages gained from the highway by those living along the route. The road was to be 65 feet (20 m), five feet wider than Fifth Avenue, with a speed limit of at least 30 miles per hour (48 km/h), and would be 20 feet (6.1 m) off the ground. It would be built of steel, with a cement face. A three-foot (1 m) sidewalk would be built for pedestrians, although the highway was intended mainly for motor vehicles. Two-block-long ramps would be provided with easy grades for entering and exiting the highway. Trucks would be allowed on the highway.

The Board of Estimate approved the highway, now costing $13.5 million on June 14, 1926. It was to be built so a second deck could be added at a later time for about $9 million if traffic warranted. Controller Charles W. Berry questioned the proposal until he realized the money would come from tax assessments, at which time he agreed with the project.

On November 10, 1926, the Sinking Fund Commission voted to give the city title to the waterfront property along the proposed highway. The highway plan was linked to a plan by the city for more piers for ocean steamships; since the highway required land takings between 47th Street and 51st Street, it was easier to combine the projects and prevent additional expense.

On February 17, 1927, the Board of Estimate adopted the final plans for the highway, setting a hearing date of March 24. It was split into two sections, Section one went from Canal Street to 59th Street. Section two was to carry the road over the NYCRR's 60th Street Yard from 59th Street to 72nd Street. Section two was approved by the Board of Estimate on August 16, 1928; section one was postponed until September 27 due to objections. On October 18, the Board of Estimate approved section one. The highway was advocated by most business interests, including the Downtown League, the Fifth Avenue Association, the West End Association, and eleven other organizations. They cited increasing traffic and the need of a bypass route to support the highway, which would cost little in comparison to its benefits. Miller spoke at a meeting of the Market and Business Men's Association of the Greenwich and Chelsea Districts on October 30, 1928, detailing plans for the highway. It was announced that between 90 and 100 meat and poultry dealers in the West Washington Market and the Gansevoort Market would be evicted to make way for the highway.

Minor changes to the highway were approved on January 10, 1929, in response to several objections. The alignment in the Chelsea district was slightly modified to avoid proposed piers, and the path through the markets was realigned to pass over a corner of the property. In addition, the 14th Street ramps were moved to the area between 19th Street and 23rd Street, where they would spare many markets at 14th Street. In addition, the West Washington Market would no longer be demolished, and instead the highway would graze the roofs of some of the stores.

==== Exotic alternatives ====
An alternate plan was put forth by John Hencken, an engineer, and approved by Ernest P. Goodrich, consulting engineer to the Regional Plan of New York and its Environs. A linear corridor would be built from the Battery to Yonkers. A freight railroad would lie underground. On ground level would be roads alongside the corridor and an indoor enclosed sidewalk. The mezzanine, between the first and second floors, would be occupied by office space. The second floor would carry a "continuous noiseless moving platform system for passenger service", with adjacent belts moving at various speeds, for a maximum of 21 miles per hour (34 km/h) in the middle. This service would be free, and would be a substitute for new subways in the corridor. Above the second floor would be about ten stories of apartments, offices, businesses, and other uses appropriate for the neighborhoods; these would be the main source of revenue to pay for the project. A high-speed motor parkway, open to passenger cars only, would lie on top. Cars would reach the upper level via ramps at both ends and elevators at convenient intervals.

Dr. Benjamin Battin, a professor at Swarthmore College, Pennsylvania, had a similar plan for an eight-story high boulevard. The street level and first floor would be connected to the Hudson River piers. The second and third stories would carry electric passenger trains, with the second floor carrying northbound traffic and southbound traffic using the third floor. A public garage would occupy the fourth and fifth floors, helping to pay off the bonds for the project. The sixth and seventh floors would carry one-way passenger car traffic, permitting speeds of up to 50 miles per hour (80 km/h). A reversible roadway, carrying cars in the direction of rush hour traffic, would occupy the eighth and ninth (top) levels. Ramps to the upper car levels would be provided every 15 to 20 blocks.

=== Art Society objections ===
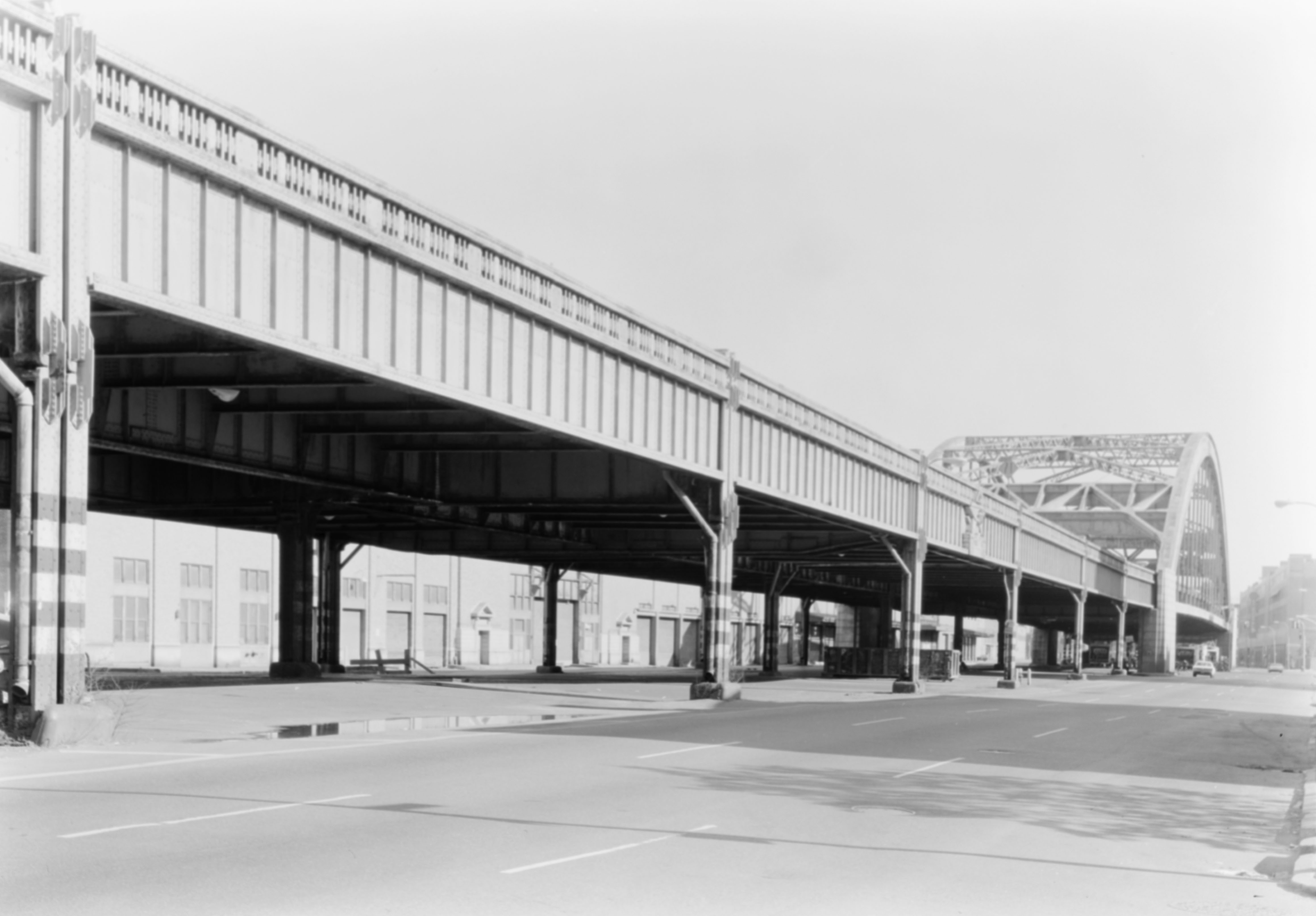
The old elevated highway, looking north towards the bridge over Canal Street

The plan was criticized by Thomas Adams, Regional Plan Association director, at the 1927 meeting of the Municipal Art Society. He disapproved of its ugliness and noise, and suggested simply clearing obstructions to the existing surface road to speed traffic. Adams instead supported a comprehensive regional plan for development in the Hudson Valley. The Fine Arts Federation also opposed the highway, saying that elevated structures were unsightly, and that if the existing street were cleared a new highway might not be required.

The City Club and New York City Mayor Jimmy Walker objected to the highway on the grounds that it would block waterfront-bound freight traffic. They believed that the plans should wait until the surface railroad tracks were removed in the area, at which point the elevated highway might not be necessary. Parallels were drawn with elevated passenger railroads, which were being torn down at the time; Henry Curran of the City Club called elevated structures "a misfit in New York". The City Club also objected to more passenger cars in downtown Manhattan.

Concerns were raised by the Women's League for the Protection of Riverside Park, which opposed routing trucks through Riverside Park, which would contain a parkway extending from the north end of the planned elevated highway. The League emphasized that commercial traffic should be banned north of 72nd Street (as it currently is on the Henry Hudson Parkway).

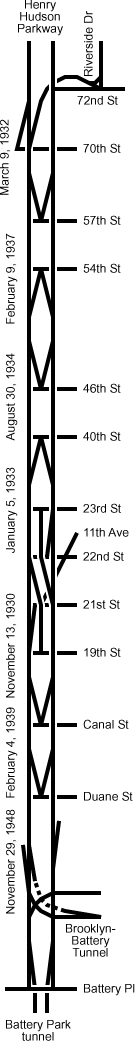

== Construction ==
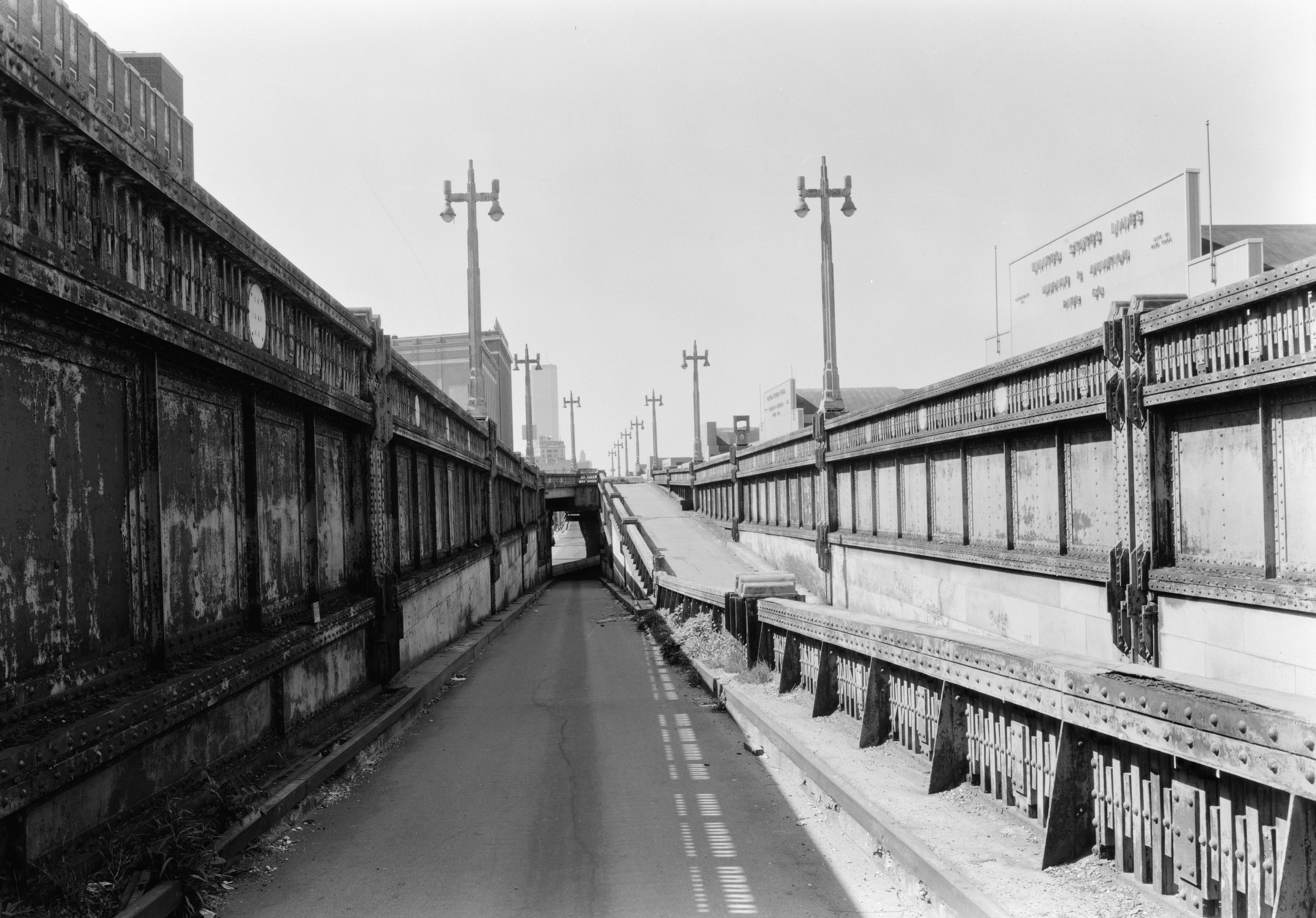
The old elevated highway, looking south on the southbound exit ramp for 19th Street, next to the Chelsea Piers. The ramp rising on the right is the southbound entrance ramp from 21st Street. This asymmetrical ramp layout only occurs here, on the first section built

Primarily, the Miller Highway consisted of six lanes, supported above the street level on steel columns, which were located at regular intervals (~80 feet) at the outer edges and center of the roadway. Longitudinal strength girders ran between the support columns along the direction of the roadway. The longitudinal girders supported the industrial looking balustrades and the median. Lateral strength girders ran between the support columns across the roadway, and was the location of the expansion joints. Smaller longitudinal and transverse floorbeams formed a lattice structure between major girders to support the road deck. The road deck consisted of reinforced concrete, on top of which the paved surface would sit. Originally this was Belgian block, and was eventually substituted or paved over with asphalt as construction materials matured. Drainage was provided at the expansion joints (on the older sections) or grated channels along the edge of the road (newest sections), with rainwater and snowmelt being plumbed to the street through scuppers and downspouts located at the main support columns. It was not uncommon during the life of the highway that it would be supporting not only traffic, but 6 to 8 inches of standing water. The high impermeable balustrades, the undersized scuppers, the use of salt to de-ice the highway, and the lack of drain cleaning / maintenance were all ingredients which contributed to the structure's demise.

=== Canal to 22nd Streets (1929–1930) ===
Construction on the first 1.5-mile (2.5 km) section, from Canal Street to 22nd Street, was started on May 24, 1929, and the road was officially opened on November 13, 1930, with some inaugural vehicles using the highway as early as October 28. Traffic was not permitted on the structure until November 17 due to unanticipated delays in cosmetic work. A speed limit of 35 miles per hour (55 km/h) was set by Police Commissioner Edward Mulrooney, and trucks were temporarily banned. On the first Sunday the road was in operation, the northbound roadway was backed up for a mile approaching the north end at 23rd Street. The northbound offramp at 23rd Street, unlike the temporary southbound onramp, was built as a permanent single lane ramp, since in the future most traffic would continue along the not-yet-finished elevated highway. Suggested fixes included a new temporary ramp to 25th Street and conversion of the temporary southbound onramp to two-way traffic. The second Sunday the road was open, rain cut down on the traffic, but police had orders to open the permanent ramp eventually intended for a northbound onramp to exiting northbound traffic if traffic conditions warranted.

A temporary 45-foot (14 m) wide elevated street was proposed by the city between 29th Street and 37th Street to bypass the New York Central Railroad's 30th Street Yard, to provide relief before the permanent highway was finished. It appears that this temporary viaduct was not built.

The original southern terminal for the elevated highway was six lanes wide and was made of stone, complete with winged ornaments and art-deco statuettes.

=== 59th to 72nd Streets (1930–1932) ===
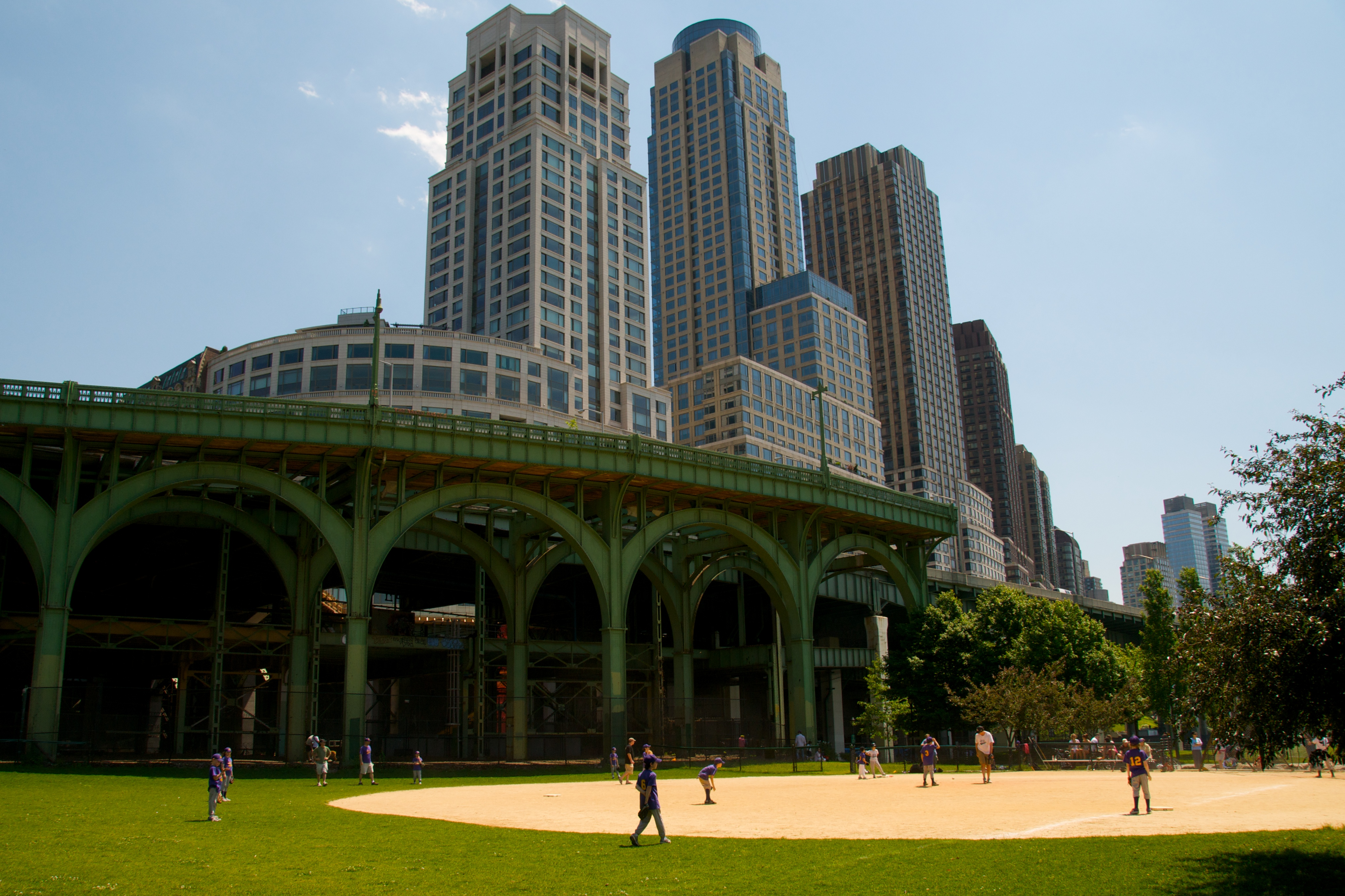
The elevated section with abandoned exit ramp that was to be extended to 70th Street

The section from 59th Street to 72nd Street was begun in September 1930, and opened to traffic on March 9, 1932. The original configuration fed directly into 72nd Street, with a 90-degree turn in the road. Once the northern extension as a parkway was built, northbound traffic would turn right directly to and from 72nd Street. A southbound left-hand entrance ramp was provided at 72nd Street, with a direct ramp from Riverside Drive (later closed), and a southbound right-hand exit ramp to 70th Street was started, but never completed. Today, the only movement remaining is a northbound entrance to the highway from 72nd Street.

The highway from 59th to 72nd Streets is the only elevated section that remains today, although it conflicts with plans for the Riverside South development project and neighborhood. A covered, at-grade replacement road to facilitate a southward expansion of Riverside Park was approved by the Federal Highway Administration in 2001. In June 2006, the developer began construction of a tunnel between 61st and 65th streets for the relocated highway. However, the rest of the tunnel remains unfinished.

=== 22nd to 38th Streets (1932–1933) ===
Construction of the elevated highway between 22nd Street and 38th Street was begun on June 21, 1932. The road was opened on January 5, 1933, just before Eleventh Avenue was closed for reconstruction of the NYCRR's 30th Street Yard.

=== 38th to 46th Streets (1933–1934) ===
Construction on the highway between 38th Street and 46th Street was begun in late 1933. This section eliminated a busy intersection at 42nd Street, where streetcars and automobiles crossed the corridor to reach the ferry to Weehawken, New Jersey. This link was opened to traffic on August 30, 1934.

When the new city piers at 48th Street, 50th Street, and 52nd Street were being planned in late 1934, direct connections between the elevated highway and the second levels of the piers were proposed. Manhattan Borough President Samuel Levy quickly spoke against these connections, citing interference with southbound traffic on the highway. The plan, which had been proposed at the request of several cruise lines, was rejected.

In 1935, the 34th Street–Midtown Association proposed a new ramp for the highway at 34th Street, having elected new directors for the purpose. This ramp would rise above the elevated railroad and highway, splitting into a northbound onramp and a southbound offramp, both on the right side of the highway. It was hoped that the ramp would help businesses in the area and provide better access to the proposed 38th Street Tunnel (now the Lincoln Tunnel) to New Jersey. The ramp was never built.

=== 46th to 59th Streets (1936–1937) ===
Construction on the final section of the originally planned highway, from 46th Street to 59th Street, was begun on February 13, 1936. It was opened to traffic on February 9, 1937, thus completing the elevated highway from Canal Street to 72nd Street.

=== Duane to Canal Streets (1938–1939) ===
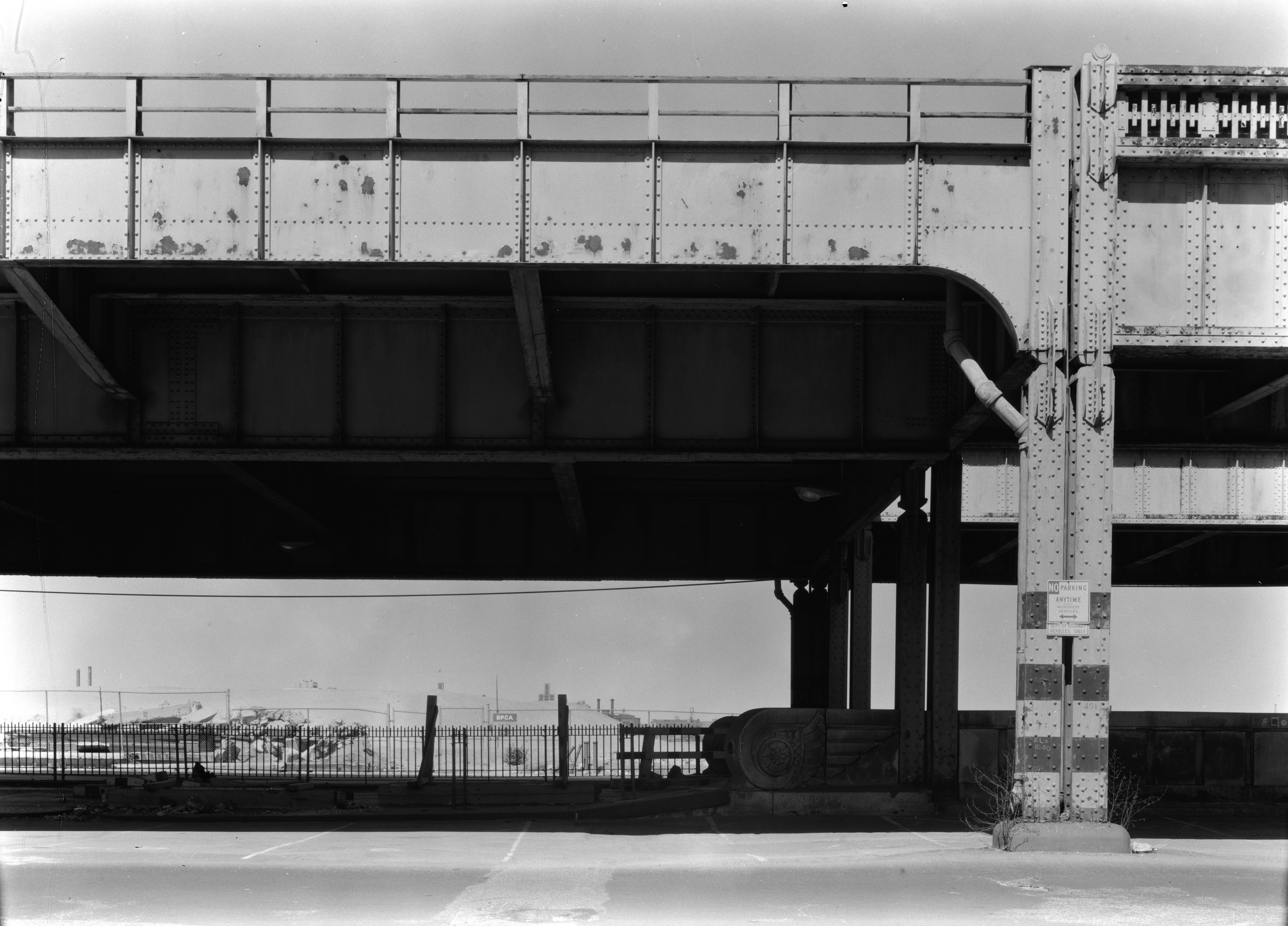
Elevated highway, looking west at Duane Street, where construction was halted during World War II; the highway to the left was built later with a different design.

On August 23, 1934, Governor Herbert Lehman signed a bill authorizing construction of a southern extension of the elevated highway from Canal Street to the Battery. However, this segment was opposed by the communities along the route since it might "result in a waste of tax funds". Construction on the first section of this, from Duane Street to Canal Street, was begun on January 24, 1938. Unlike previous sections of highway, which used granite blocks as a surface, concrete was used on the new section. The road was opened to traffic on February 4, 1939. A steel superstructure consisting of an arched bridge was built at Canal Street because the Holland Tunnel below ground restricted locations of bridge supports.

=== Barclay to Duane Streets (1947–1948) ===
After an extended break due to World War II, construction on the final section of the southern extension, from Carlisle Street to Barclay Street, was begun on April 21, 1947. This section was expanded to reach Duane Street in the north, and was opened on November 29, 1948.

=== Battery Underpass to Barclay Street (1950–1951) ===
The southern end was connected to the Brooklyn–Battery Tunnel on May 25, 1950. A four-lane tunnel under Battery Park, the Battery Park Underpass, taking traffic to the South Street Elevated Highway opened on April 10, 1951.

== Closure and demolition ==
=== 1973 collapse ===
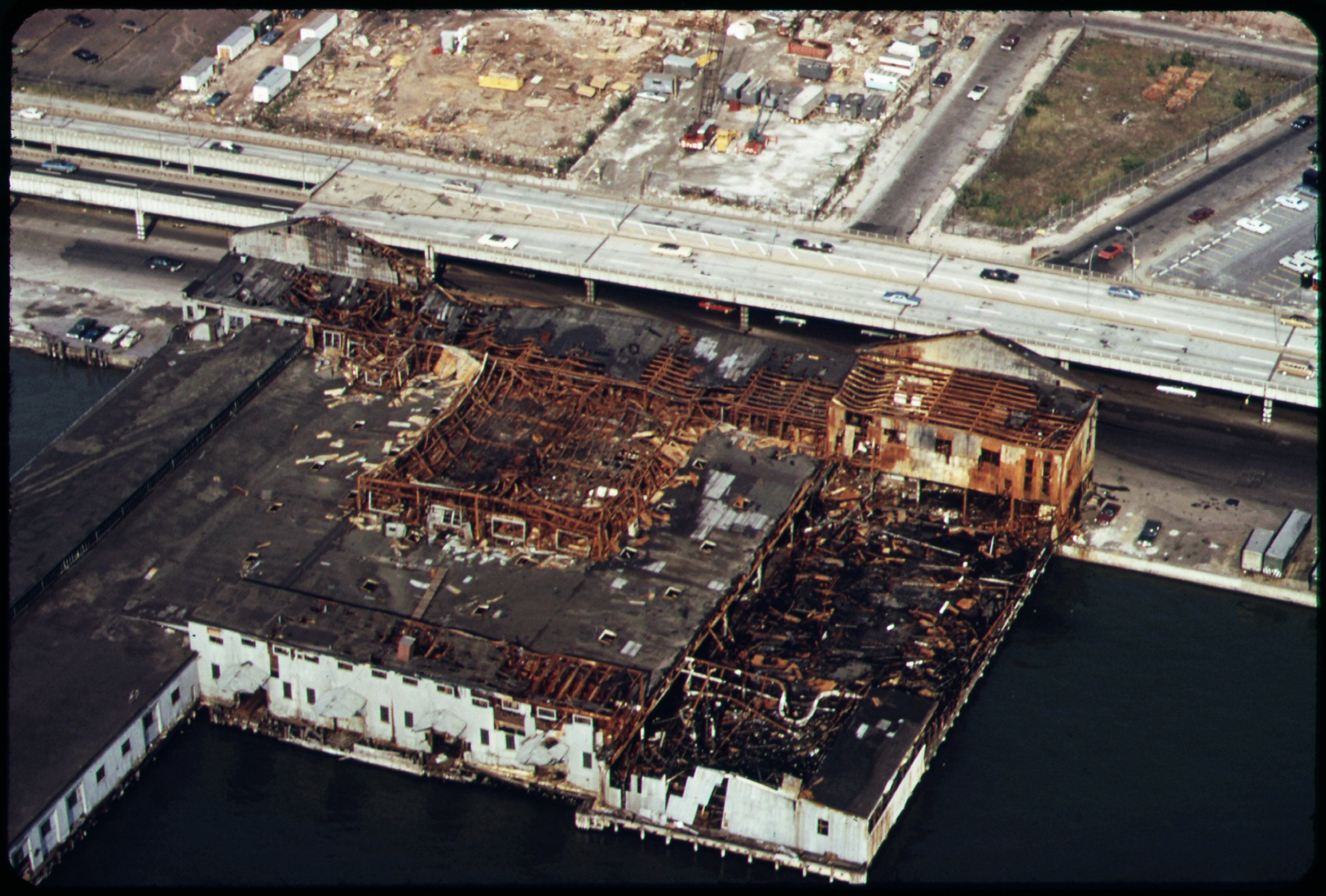
May 1973, seven months before collapse

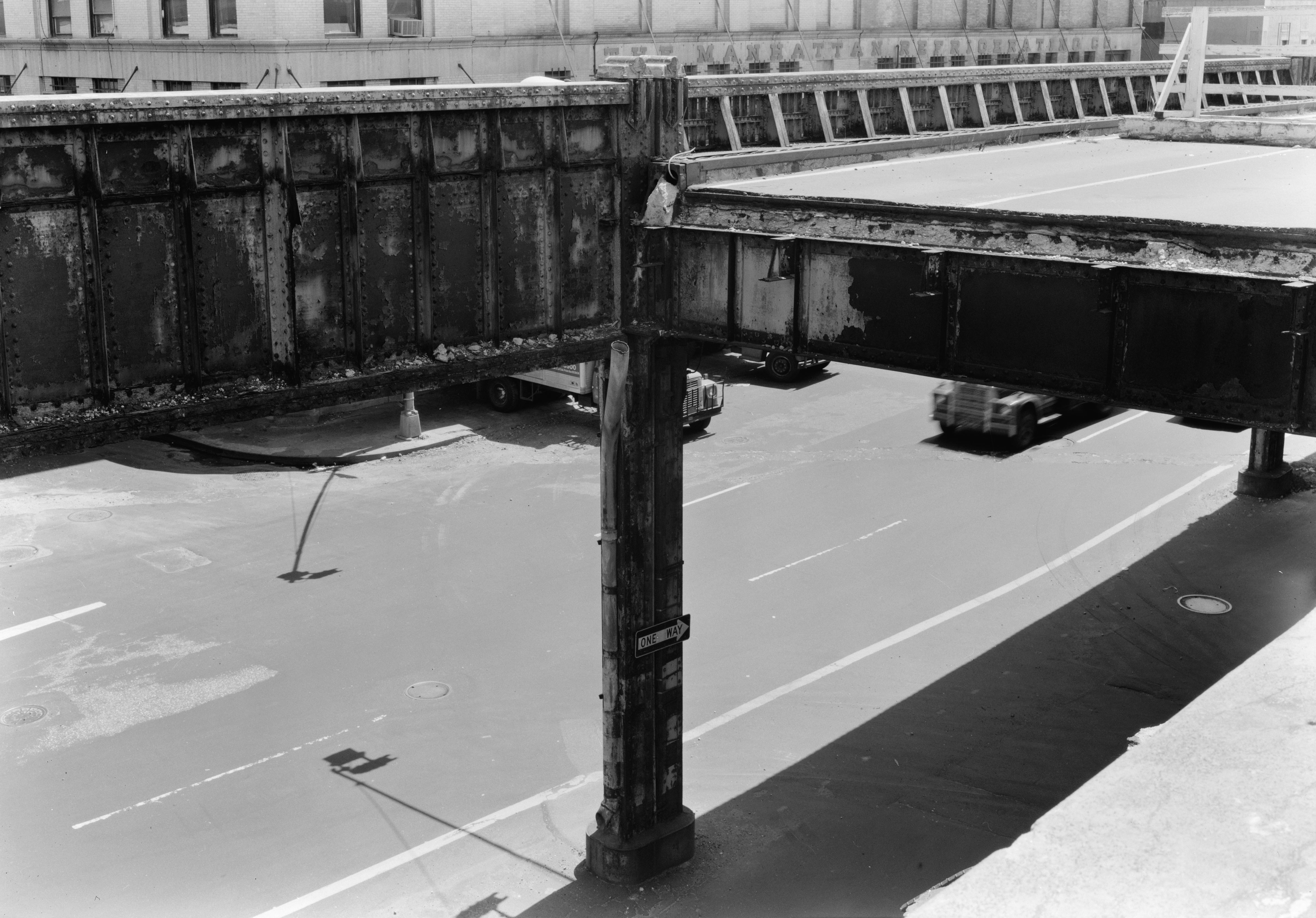
Collapsed section at 14th Street

On December 15, 1973, an 80-foot-long (24 m) section of the northbound lanes between Little West 12th Street and Gansevoort Street collapsed under the weight of a dump truck, which was thought to carry over 10 short tons (9,100 kg; 8.9 long tons) of asphalt for ongoing repairs of the highway. The joints between transverse stringers holding up this section of roadway and the eastern main girder (holding the decorative friezes), failed. A four-door sedan followed the truck through the hole; neither driver was seriously injured. It took hours to back all the traffic off the span trapped behind the collapse. It was later learned that the truck was actually carrying 30 short tons (27,000 kg; 27 long tons) of asphalt, and was 9 short tons (8,200 kg; 8.0 long tons) overloaded. Blame was assigned to the trucking company, Edenwald Construction Corp. of Whitestone, Queens, but they were still awarded a no-bid contract to clean up the mess. The day after, both directions were closed indefinitely south of 18th Street. This not only closed off the oldest section (between Canal Street and 18th Street), but also the newest sections (south of Canal Street), because ramps south of the collapse only permitted northbound entrances and southbound exits. The southernmost northbound exit was at 23rd Street.

The highway was indefinitely closed south of 18th Street. The northbound lanes were also closed from 18th to 48th Street, while southbound traffic between 42nd Street and 18th Street was reduced to one lane. Eventually inspections revealed that the highway south of 46th Street was not structurally sound, and had to be closed to vehicular traffic. The ramps to/from 46th Street were configured as the temporary southern terminal for northbound traffic on the highway, and the ramps to/from 57th Street were configured as the temporary southern terminal for southbound traffic. The segment north of 57th Street carried traffic over the Penn Central Rail yards, and could not be closed as there were no surface streets on which to reroute traffic. This section of Miller Highway remained in use into the 1980s, and has since been rebuilt.

=== Rehabilitation proposals ===
After the cleanup of the collapsed section at Gansevoort Street, the highway remained standing but closed to traffic while its fate was decided.

The City performed a preliminary survey of the highway after the collapse, and confirmed extreme structural deterioration of connections between the longitudinal girders and transverse floor beams. The City had not inspected this structure since its opening, and hired Hardesty and Hanover, Consulting Engineers, to perform a full inspection of the roadway in 1974. A four-volume report was delivered to the City, stating that:

1. Public officials anticipated its early demise as far back as the mid-1950s.
2. The use of salts to melt ice and snow, combined with heavy traffic and poor drainage, corroded and eroded the deck, of which portions had fallen down into West Street before the major December 1973 collapse.
3. The structure south of 46th Street should be closed to vehicular traffic until a decision is made to demolish or repair / rehabilitate the structure.

Restoration of the structure was feasible, but cost-prohibitive. The Chief Engineer of the New York Highway Department estimated a $58 million cost to partially rehabilitate the structure. Hardesty and Hanover estimated it would cost $66 million (1976 dollars) for a new road deck, median, lighting, painting, and steel repairs. A New York City Highway Department representative estimated that a complete rehabilitation, including modernization, was estimated to cost $88 million. The last option was Westway.

The City chose not to pursue rehabilitation of the existing structure because of its level of deterioration. Officials considered five options, including building a six-lane interstate highway, as well as constructing a surface highway that would cost only 20 to 25 percent as much. In March 1975, officials announced an agreement to build an interstate highway between the Battery Tunnel and the Lincoln Tunnel, taking advantage of funding and financing from the Federal Highway Trust Fund. Although ninety percent of the interstate highway's cost would have been eligible for federal funding, there was still disagreement over the proposal.

=== Demolition ===
The City elected to leave the structure standing, as there was no money available to demolish the structure. Portions were demolished when they became a threat to people or property at ground level or non-city money became available. Federal Westway money was used for the demolition of the elevated structure from 42nd Street south to the Battery and to pave surface streets as a temporary roadway while the battle over Westway continued. The portion of the highway adjacent to the collapse (Jane Street north to 26th Street) came down first, in 1977, and the portion between 26th and 42nd Streets was demolished between November 1981 and the summer of 1982. The highway from Jane Street south to Spring Street was torn down between the spring and fall of 1981, and the highway from Spring Street south to the Battery was torn down between the summer of 1981 and the spring of 1982.

The segment from 43rd to 59th Streets was left standing, since it was thought that it could be refurbished and integrated into an extension of Westway. The remaining highway would be funded separately, as interstate funds could not be used to connect an interstate highway to a limited-use facility (in this case, the Henry Hudson Parkway). Ramp and lane improvements were made in 1981, permanently closing the highway south of 59th Street. Previously, northbound traffic could enter the highway at 43rd Street and southbound traffic was directed off the highway at 59th Street. The city demolished the 43rd-59th Street portion by October 1989.

Rehabilitation of the elevated structure between 59th Street and 72nd Street was completed in 1995. The only remaining section of the Miller Highway, with lampposts, is an abandoned southbound exit-ramp stub just north of 72nd Street.

== Exit list ==
The entire route was in Manhattan of the New York City borough of Manhattan.

mi	km	Destinations	Notes
		Battery Place	Southern terminus; at-grade intersection
		FDR Drive north (Battery Park Underpass)	Southbound exit and northbound entrance
		Brooklyn–Battery Tunnel (I-478 south)	At-grade intersection except southbound exit
		Duane Street	Southbound exit and northbound entrance
		Canal Street	Southbound exit and northbound entrance
		19th Street / 23rd Street	Signed for 19th Street southbound, 23rd Street northbound
		40th Street	Northbound exit and southbound entrance
		46th Street	Southbound exit and northbound entrance
		54th Street	Northbound exit and southbound entrance
		57th Street	Southbound exit and northbound entrance
		70th Street	Southbound exit only
		72nd Street	No southbound exit
		Henry Hudson Parkway north	Continuation north
1.000 mi = 1.609 km; 1.000 km = 0.621 mi: Incomplete access

== In popular culture ==
The West Side Elevated (Miller) Highway makes appearances in the following films and television shows:

- Saturday Night Live. The closing scene of "La Dolce Gilda" (1978) in the segment Schiller's Reel was filmed on the closed uptown lanes of the Miller Highway at 23rd Street. The Starrett–Lehigh Building is clearly visible.
- The Ultimate Warrior. The closed highway (and the asymmetrical ramps south of 23rd Street), along with portions uptown near the Passenger Ship Terminal, are used during the opening and closing credits to show a dystopian New York of the future.
- Wolfen
- Taxi Driver The highway can be seen, with traffic flowing on it, in an early scene.
- The Hustler. Arthur's Pool Hall was located on Twelfth Avenue, adjacent to the highway.
- West Side Story. During the film's opening fly-over scenes, after the title card, the highway is visible next to the SS United States.
- Maude. The first travel shot (when "Starring BEATRICE ARTHUR" appears on-screen) during the opening credits sequence was filmed on the highway.
- The American Friend (1979). After the hit, the scene switches from the Paris Métro to the West Side Highway (about 1hr 4 minutes into film).
- Eyes of Laura Mars (1978). Some scenes were filmed next to the West Side Highway opposite the 1970s 'Ramrod' gay bar, in the area in front of and inside the old Pier 45.
