= Senator Greenberg =

Senator Greenberg may refer to:

- Abraham Greenberg (1881–1941), New York State Senate
- Martin L. Greenberg (born 1932), New Jersey State Senate
- Samuel L. Greenberg (1898–1992), New York State Senate
