= Senator Levy =

Senator Levy may refer to:

- Eugene Levy (politician) (1926–1990), New York State Senate
- Meyer Levy (1887–1967), New York State Senate
- Norman J. Levy (1931–1998), New York State Senate
