= Samuel H. Hofstadter =

American politician (1894–1970)

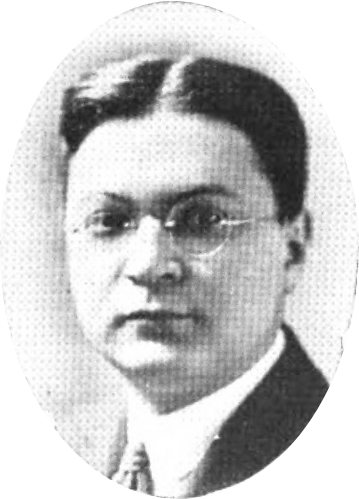
Hofstadter c. 1929

Samuel Harold Hofstadter (July 22, 1894 – July 10, 1970) was an American lawyer and politician from New York.

== Life ==
He was born on July 22, 1894, in Kraków, then located in Austria-Hungary, now the second largest city in Poland. He was the son of Meier Hofstadter (1864–1935) and Emma (Rosenzweig) Hofstadter (1866–1931). The family removed first to London, and in 1899 to New York City.

He graduated LL.B. from New York Law School in 1913. Upon graduation he was awarded the first prize for superior excellence in scholarship in the senior class, day school; and the Townsend Wandell Gold Medal for greatest proficiency in the law of real property. He practiced law in New York City, and was a Deputy New York Attorney General from 1922 to 1924.

Hofstadter was a member of the New York State Assembly (New York Co., 15th D.) in 1925, 1926, 1927 and 1928. On March 1, 1927, he married Rose Wohl (born 1899). In May 1928, Hofstadter was rated by the Citizens Union as New York City's best qualified assemblyman.

He was a member of the New York State Senate (17th D.) from 1929 to 1932, sitting in the 152nd, 153rd, 154th and 155th New York State Legislatures. In 1931, he sponsored the creation of a joint legislative committee to probe into corruption in New York City. The committee was approved by the Legislature on March 24. It was made up of three state senators and four assemblymen, and was chaired by Hofstadter, and became known as the Hofstadter Committee. Samuel Seabury was appointed legal counsel to the committee and directed the actual investigation. The investigation led to the resignation of Mayor Jimmy Walker on September 1, 1932. A month later, Hofstadter was placed on the Republican ticket for the Supreme Court, and received the endorsement by Tammany Hall which caused a wave of protest. Hofstadter denied that there was a "deal" with Tammany, and said that he had been endorsed without his asking.

He was a justice of the New York Supreme Court (1st D.) from 1933 to 1964, and sat on the Appellate Division from 1947 to 1964, when he reached the constitutional age limit. Afterwards he was an Official Referee (i.e. senior additional judge) of the Supreme Court until the end of 1969.

He died on July 10, 1970, at his home at 12 East 86th Street in Manhattan, of a heart attack; and was buried at the Union Field Cemetery in Ridgewood, Queens.

Historian Richard Hofstadter (1916–1970) was his nephew.

== Notes ==
New York State Assembly
Preceded by Joseph Steinberg	New York State Assembly; New York County, 15th District; 1925–1928	Succeeded by Abbot Low Moffat
New York State Senate
Preceded by Abraham Greenberg	New York State Senate; 17th District; 1929–1932	Succeeded by Albert Wald
