= FDR Drive =

Highway in New York City

Franklin D. Roosevelt East River Drive
- FDR Drive
- FDR Drive highlighted in red

Route information
- Maintained by NYSDOT and NYCDOT
- Length: 9.68 mi (15.58 km)
- Existed: 1955–present
- History: Upgraded in 1966
- Restrictions: No commercial vehicles north of exit 1

Major junctions
- South end: I-478 Toll / NY 9A / West Side Highway in Battery Park City
- Brooklyn Bridge in Two Bridges
- North end: Harlem River Drive / RFK Bridge / Willis Avenue Bridge in East Harlem

Location
- Country: United States
- State: New York
- Counties: New York

Highway system
- New York Highways; Interstate; US; State; Reference; Parkways

Franklin D. Roosevelt East River Drive, commonly known as the FDR Drive, is a controlled-access parkway on the east side of the New York City borough of Manhattan. It starts near South and Broad Streets, just north of the Battery Park Underpass, and runs north along the East River to the 125th Street / Robert F. Kennedy Bridge interchange, where it becomes Harlem River Drive. All of FDR Drive is designated New York State Route 907L (NY 907L), an unsigned reference route.

FDR Drive features a mix of below-grade, at-grade, and elevated sections, as well as three partially covered tunnels. The parkway is mostly three lanes in each direction, except for several small sections.

By law, the current weight limit on FDR Drive from 23rd Street to Harlem River Drive in both directions is posted 8,000 pounds (3,600 kg). All commercial vehicles (including trucks) are banned from FDR Drive north of exit 1.

== Route description ==
The East River Greenway runs below, beside, or above FDR Drive along nearly its entire length, except for a section between 41st and 53rd Streets. A plaque dedicating the East River Drive is visible on the southbound roadway before entering the Gracie Mansion tunnel at 90th Street.

=== Downtown ===
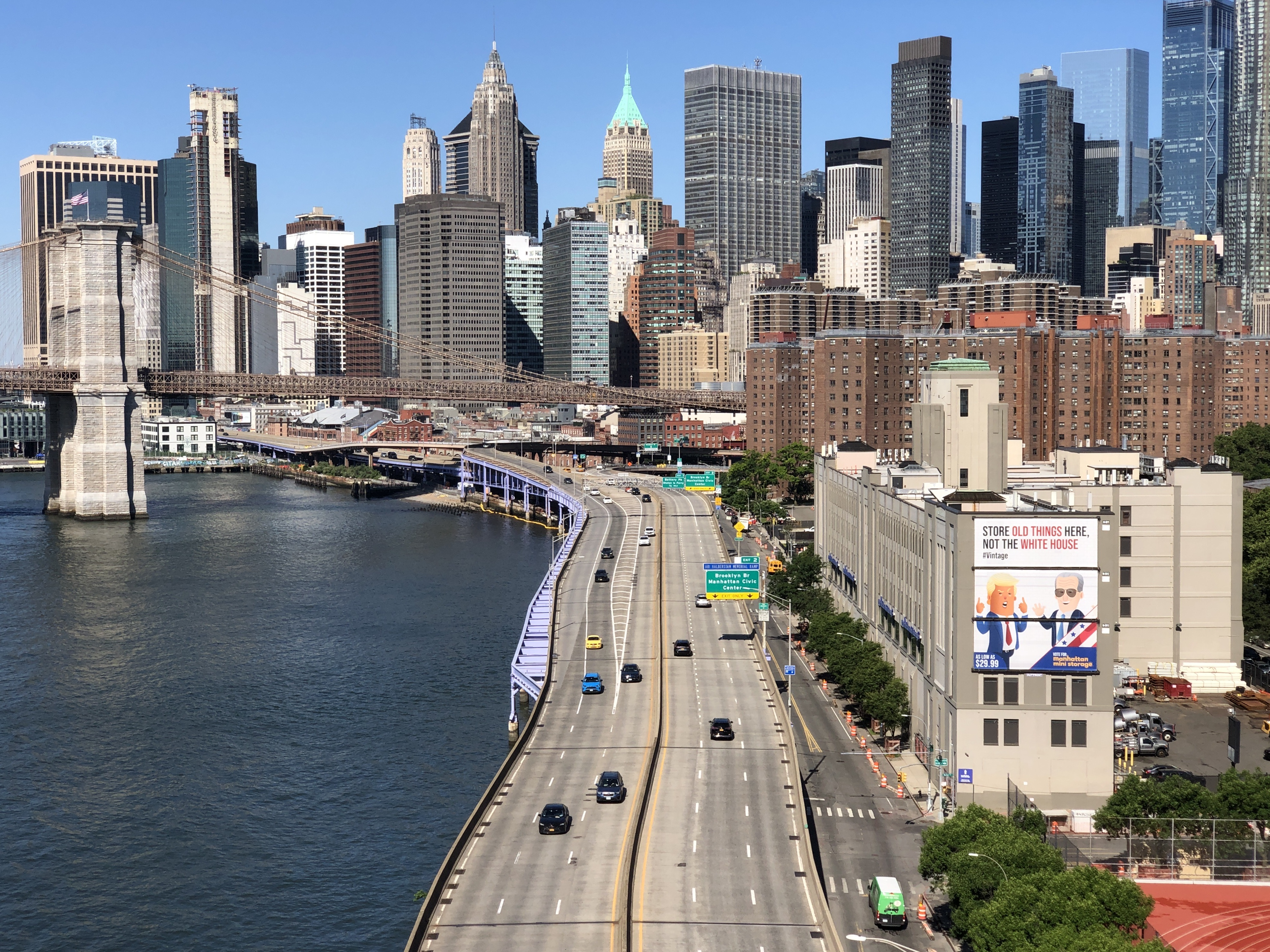
FDR Drive southbound approaching the Brooklyn Bridge, which connects Manhattan and Brooklyn

FDR Drive starts at the southern tip of Manhattan at South and Whitehall Streets in the Financial District. It rises from the underground Battery Park Underpass to an elevated viaduct above South Street, with an at-grade connection to South Street at exit 1. The elevated viaduct continues northeast, with an interchange at Brooklyn Bridge at exit 2. The elevated road, also known as the South Street Viaduct, continues until Gouverneur Slip, near the Manhattan Bridge interchange (exit 3), where there are a southbound exit and northbound entrance. From here, the road is at-grade, with a southbound exit/entrance at Grand Street, exit 4.

FDR Drive continues north through Lower East Side and Alphabet City, and dips under Houston Street at exit 5, in a three-way interchange. It continues north as an at-grade road. Between 14th and 15th Streets, FDR Drive passes the Con Edison East River Generating Station. The power plant is surrounded by ramps for the former exit 6, a southbound exit and entrance which was closed for security purposes after September 11, 2001.

By 18th Street, FDR Drive curves north onto an elevated viaduct above Avenue C. The elevated viaduct continues until 25th Street to serve the 23rd Street interchange at exit 7. This exit serves the neighborhood of Kips Bay. At 23rd Street, Avenue C continues as the northbound service road for FDR Drive, while the southbound lanes split from the main highway at 25th Street.

=== Midtown ===
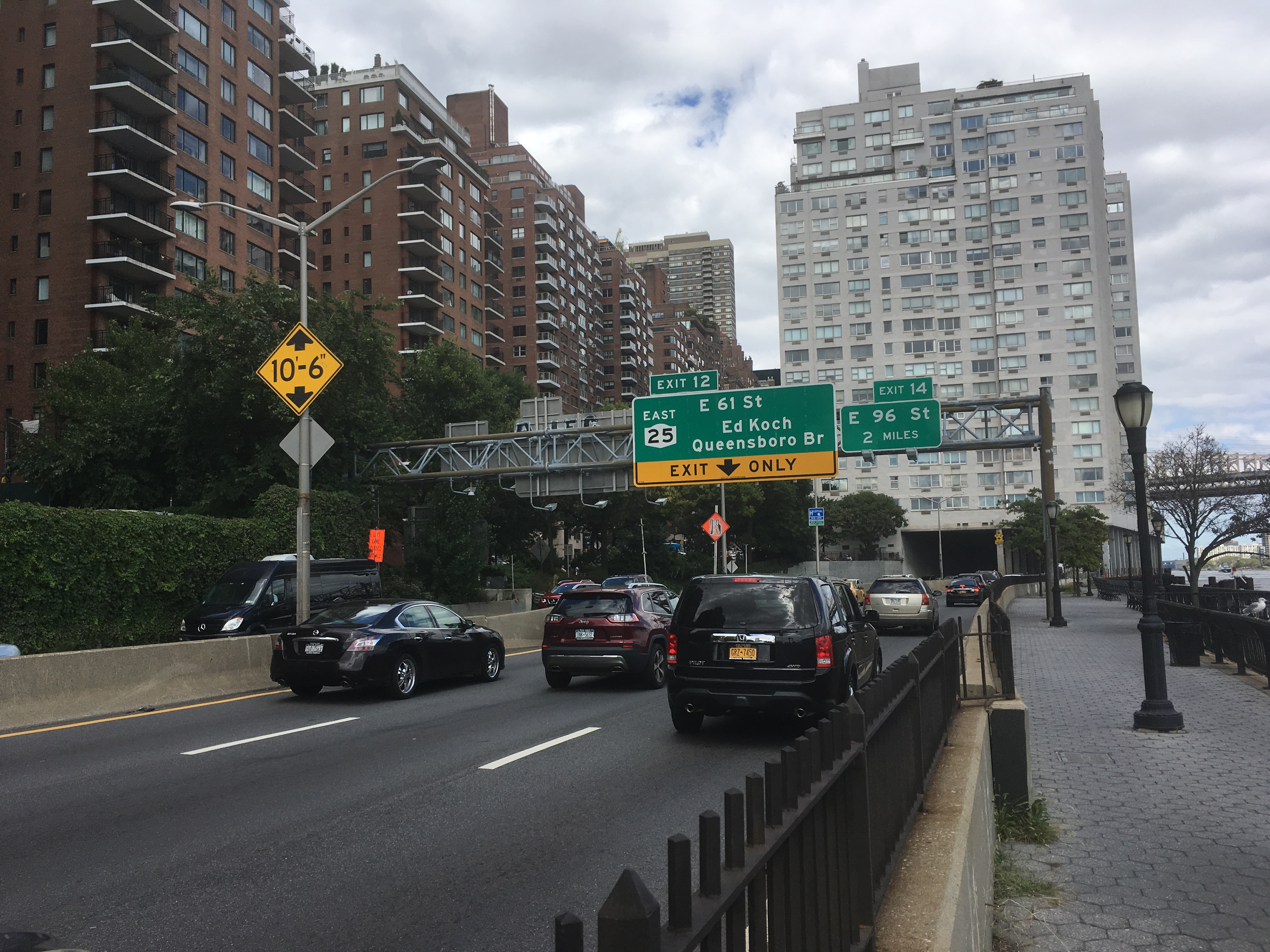
FDR Drive northbound approaching the Queensboro Bridge interchange

FDR Drive continues north as an at-grade road, with the Waterside Plaza complex located along the East River to the east of the parkway. The southbound lanes ascend to a viaduct at 28th Street, and the northbound lanes ascend at 30th Street. There are a southbound entrance and northbound exit at ground level at 28th-30th Streets, where the southbound service road begins again. The northbound exit, labeled exit 8, serves 34th Street in Murray Hill, which is located four blocks north; the FDR Drive service road curves underneath the main highway until 36th Street. Another southbound entrance is located at 34th Street itself, and rises to the viaduct level.

At 38th Street, the northbound-only exit 9 for 42nd Street, serving Turtle Bay, splits from FDR Drive. Exit 9 continues as an elevated ramp until the intersection of 42nd Street and First Avenue, where it becomes the westbound lanes of 42nd Street. FDR Drive dips onto street level and merges with the northbound service road. The southbound service road continues parallel to FDR Drive, and the southbound exit 8 splits from the parkway near 41st Street. The southbound service road then becomes the eastbound lanes of 42nd Street.

The headquarters of the United Nations was constructed on a platform above at-grade FDR Drive from 42nd to 48th Streets. The southbound roadway is inside a later structure resembling a tunnel while the northbound roadway is located just outside of the tunnel. This section is often referred to as the United Nations Tunnel, even though only the westernmost lane of the northbound roadway is under the structure.

At 48th Street, FDR Drive emerges from the United Nations tunnel. A northbound ramp from First Avenue merges onto the northbound roadway. The southbound roadway contains two exits: exit 10 at 49th Street, and exit 11 at 53rd Street. At 54th Street, the road enters the Sutton Place Tunnel, which passes under apartment buildings on the east side of Sutton Place and York Avenue until 60th Street. In this tunnel, the southbound roadway is raised and runs over the northbound roadway for northbound access to and from the Queensboro Bridge interchange (exit 12). As part of the design in this area, numerous homes on the river were demolished and rebuilt or otherwise modified to accommodate the highway. At 63rd Street, the southbound lanes descend to ground level, at the same elevation as the northbound lanes.

=== Uptown ===
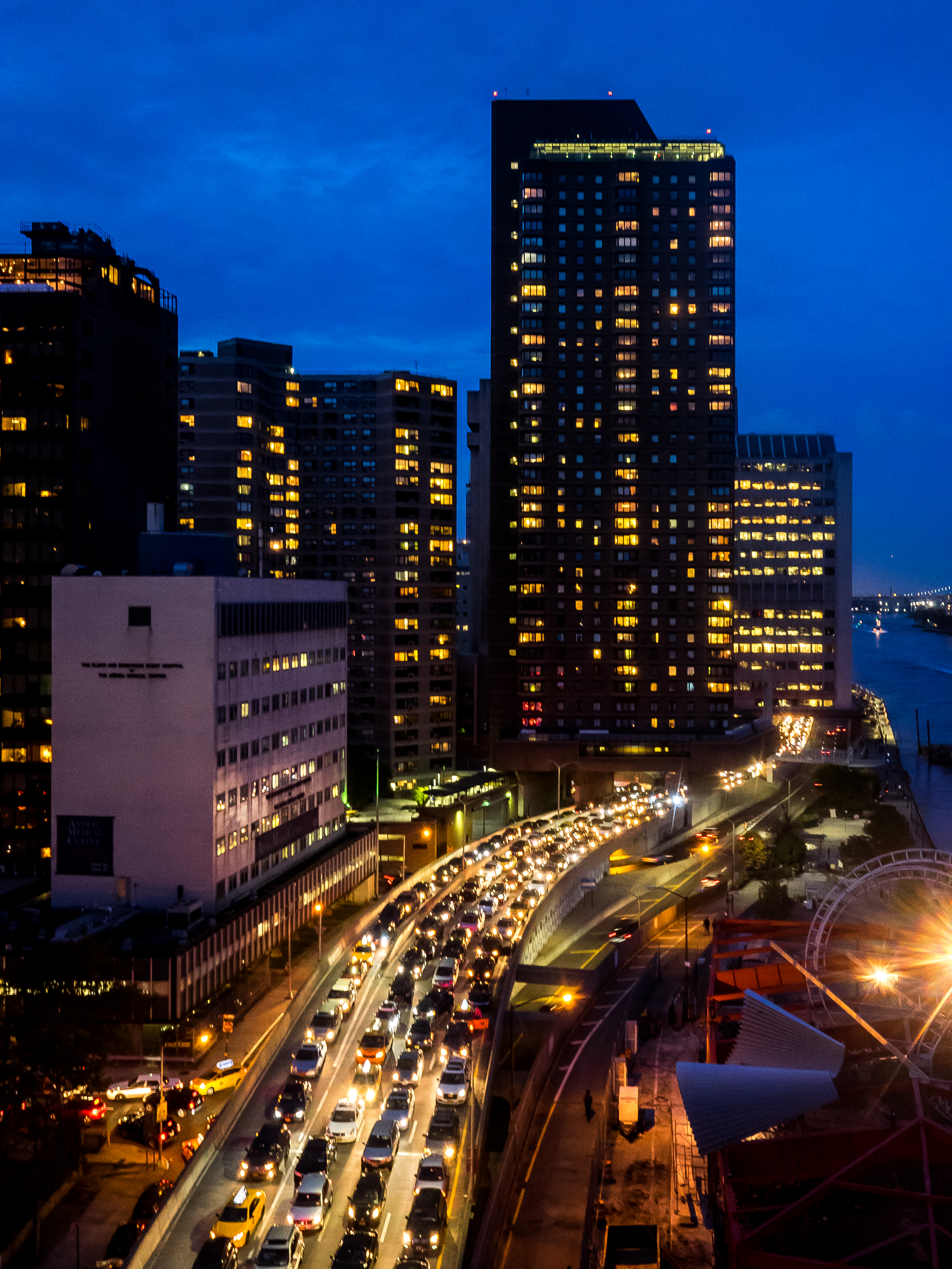
FDR Drive at night in September 2015

From 63rd to 71st Streets, FDR Drive passes under a series of interconnected at-grade tunnels. The segment from 63rd to 68th Street runs under an annex constructed by Rockefeller University, while the section of roadway between 68th and 71st Streets runs underneath the pilotis of the NewYork–Presbyterian Hospital. Afterward, FDR Drive continues north at ground level. There is a southbound-only entrance and exit, labeled exit 13, at 71st–73rd Streets, serving Lenox Hill on the Upper East Side. Another southbound-only entrance exists at 79th Street; there is no exit from either direction, nor is there any exit number reserved for this interchange.

From 81st to 90th Streets runs a final, enclosed double-decker structure. The southbound roadway is again raised over the northbound roadway in a short segment of the tunnel between 81st and 86th Streets. The promenade of Carl Schurz Park was built over the highway in 1939, near Gracie Mansion, the New York City mayor's residence. There is a southbound entrance to FDR Drive at the intersection of 92nd Street and York Avenue. York Avenue then parallels FDR Drive until 96th Street, where York Avenue ends. FDR Drive ascends onto a short elevated viaduct over the 96th Street interchange (exit 14) then descends to street level again.

The remaining portion of FDR Drive is at grade, passing through East Harlem. There is a southbound-only entrance at 102nd Street, as well as a southbound-only exit at 106th Street, labeled exit 15. At 116th Street, there is another southbound-only exit and entrance numbered exit 16. When FDR Drive reaches 120th Street, there is an interchange (exit 17) for the Robert F. Kennedy Bridge, where it transitions into the Harlem River Drive and continues north after 125th Street.

== History ==
=== 20th century ===
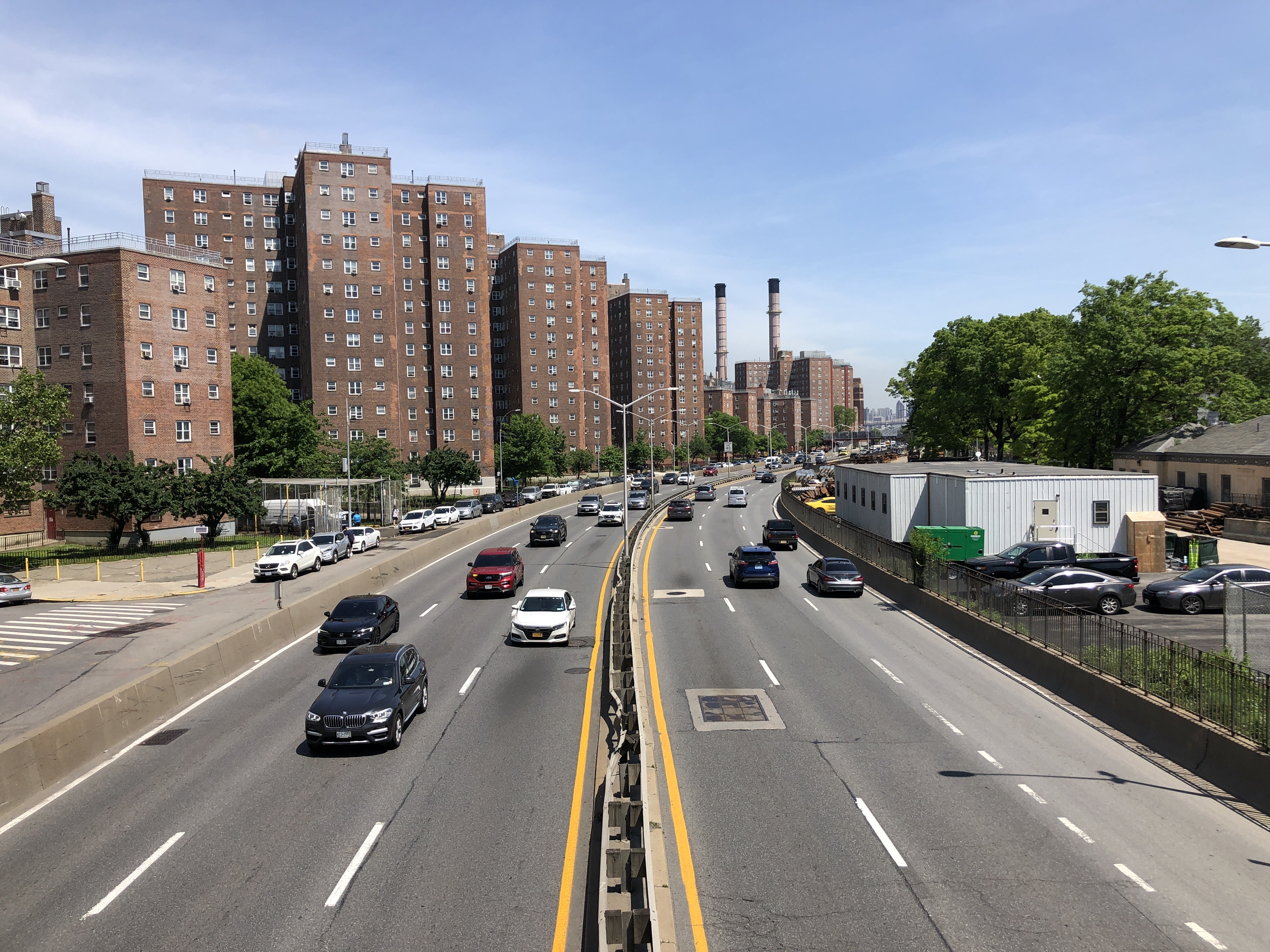
FDR Drive seen from the 6th Street overpass in 2024

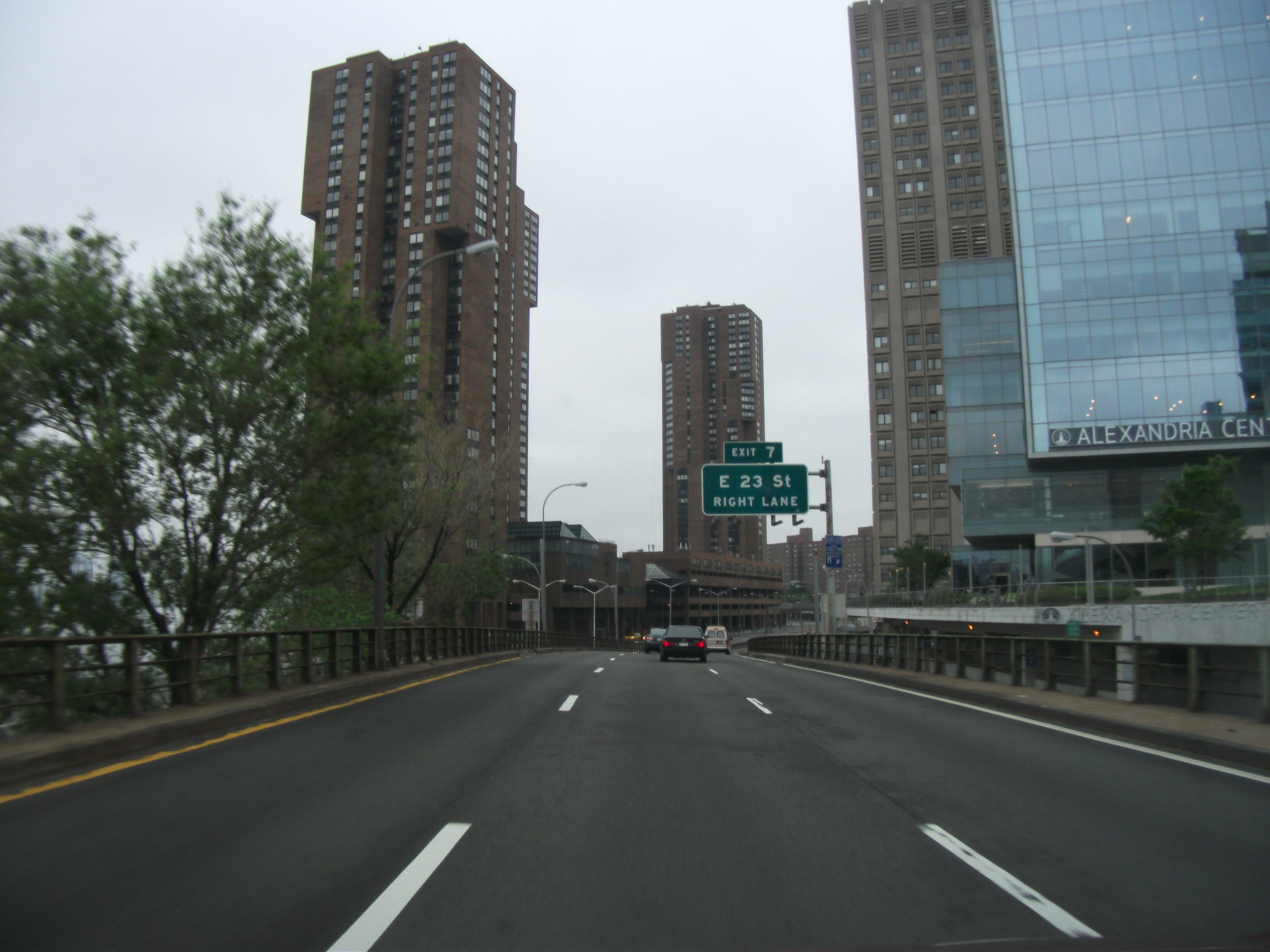
Southbound viaduct at 28th Street in Kips Bay

A shorefront parkway in Manhattan along the East River was first proposed by Manhattan Borough President Julius Miller in 1929. The 3.5-mile (5.6 km) parkway would extend from South Street to 54th Street. The first sections of the East River Drive were constructed in the 1930s and were designed by Robert Moses. Moses faced the difficulties of building a parkway/boulevard combination along the East River while minimizing disruptions to residents. Many property owners along the East River Drive, especially in Midtown, opposed the boulevard unless noise mitigation measures were added. The section from 125th Street and the Triborough Bridge ramp south to 92nd Street was completed in 1936. The sections from 92nd Street down to Battery Park (with the exception of a section from 42nd to 49th Streets, located underneath the headquarters of the United Nations) were built as a boulevard running at street level. The first "downtown" section of the boulevard, between Grand and 12th Streets, was completed in June 1937. Two more downtown sections, from 12th to 14th Streets and then from 14th to 18th Streets, were opened in 1939. A short connector from Grand to Montgomery Street was completed in May 1940, which meant that the boulevard was now continuous from Montgomery to 30th Streets. The next month, a large stretch from 49th to 92nd Streets opened. By this point, the only contiguous section that remained to be completed was the stretch between 30th and 49th Streets. The section of the East River Drive from 23rd to 34th Streets was completed in October 1941. Known as the Bristol Basin, this section was built on wartime rubble dumped by cargo ships returning from Bristol, England, during World War II. The German Luftwaffe bombed Bristol heavily. After delivering war supplies to the British, the ships' crews loaded rubble onto the ships for ballast, then sailed back to New York, where construction crews made use of it. On June 29, 1942, a plaque commemorating the use of rubble was dedicated by Mayor Fiorello LaGuardia, and is currently installed at the Waterside Plaza complex. The final part of the original boulevard, between 34th and 49th Streets, opened in May 1942. Construction of this segment required modifications to the elevators and underground carriers that transported coal and ash between barges docked in the East River and the Waterside Generating Station and Kips Bay Steam Plant.

East River Drive was renamed as Franklin Delano Roosevelt East River Drive in June 1945, in honor of Franklin Delano Roosevelt; the road is commonly referred to simply as "FDR Drive".

Only a few years after its oldest stretches opened, city officials began planning to upgrade the parkway into an expressway. At-grade intersections would be eliminated on certain portions, while others would be replaced by new concrete viaducts, and others would be capped as tunnels. The road would also be extended to meet the Brooklyn Battery Tunnel. A plan to build a three-level section from 81st to 89th Streets was released in April 1940, followed by an East River Drive overpass over 96th Street in June. Due to a bulkhead restriction, a section from 51st to 60th Streets was already being built with two decks. Future reconstruction designs were created that would convert FDR Drive into the expressway that is in use today. In 1948, construction was completed on a project that converted the section from 49th to 92nd Streets into a limited access highway. An elevated ramp between 18th and 25th Streets, serving as an extension of the highway south of 23rd Street, was completed the next year, replacing another at-grade section. The Battery Park Underpass was completed in 1951, indirectly connecting to the Brooklyn-Battery Tunnel. The South Street Viaduct, connecting the at-grade parkway north of Grand Street to the Battery Park Underpass and Brooklyn–Battery Tunnel at the southern tip of Manhattan, was completed in May 1954, replacing the at-grade segment. In 1960, construction was completed on a project that rebuilt the segment from Jackson Street and East 14th Street into a controlled access highway. In 1966, construction was completed in a project that rebuilt the segment between East 14th Street and East 42nd Street into a grade separated expressway with an elevated viaduct. This marked completion of the expressway upgrade, and made it so that all exits were grade separated interchanges. It also made it so that most of the road consisted of six lanes, with only a few exceptions.

In 1967, ramps were built that would have provided connections to the Mid-Manhattan Expressway. However, after plans for the expressway were abandoned, the exit went unused, largely because there was already an exit four blocks north, at 34th Street. The unused exit was then blocked with a semi-permanent concrete barricade.

In 1965, plans were announced for direct ramps to the Brooklyn Bridge, this would eliminate congestion at its approach by relocating traffic onto the expressway. The ramp to the Brooklyn Bridge was opened in 1968, followed by the ramp onto the FDR Drive in 1969.

In 1971, plans to reconstruct the portion of the South Street Viaduct between its southern end and exit 2 as an extension of the Battery Park Underpass were announced. This was meant to improve the quality of life experienced by those who live near the structure. A new exit 1, consisting of a diamond configuration onto Wall Street would be built, replacing the existing exit 1 onto Water Street. Primarily due to its expensive cost, this was never undertaken.

In the mid-1990s, a project to reconstruct the segment from 14th Street to 34th Street was undertaken.

Beginning on August 15, 1985, the ramp with 42nd Street was closed for an extensive rebuild. When it reopened in April, it had an entirely new viaduct. This was part of a larger project to rebuild the portion of the South Street Viaduct between 42nd Street and 50th Street. This structure, which had deteriorated significantly in its later years, was known to be at significant risk of collapse. A replacement ramp at 49th Street opened in October 1998.

=== 21st century ===
Exit 6, an at-grade interchange which connected to at 15th Street, passed through a ConEdison substation, which handles most of the electricity for Lower Manhattan. It was permanently closed after the September 11 attacks when city and ConEdison officials concluded it was too risky to allow such easy access to such a critical piece of infrastructure. The exit was demolished in 2014 after the New York State Department of Transportation received notification from the New York City Police Department that the exit would not be re-opened since the ConEdison facility was deemed a potential terrorist target. East 15th Street, as well as a corresponding entrance ramp from 14th Street, were also closed east of Avenue C, except to ConEdison and law enforcement vehicles. All signage of exit 6 was dismantled by early 2016.

In 2002, a project to improve safety from East 63rd Street to the southern terminus at the Triborough Bridge was completed. Also as part of this project, Exit 16 was entirely reconstructed.

In 2004, a reconstruction of the Gracie Mansion Underpass was completed.

In November 2005, as part of the reconstruction of NY 9A, the western end of the Battery Park Underpass was extended to the north by about 25 feet (7.6 m).

In December 2002, work began to reconstruct the segment of roadway between East 54th Street and East 63rd Street. It was substantially completed in August 2007, and involved the construction of a temporary roadway in some areas.

During Hurricane Sandy, the Battery Park Underpass was filled with seawater. The damage resulted in major repairs.

In November 2015, a resurfacing was completed between 125th Street and the Brooklyn Bridge.

In 2016, the Rockfeller Tunnel was extended.

In 2019, the South Street viaduct was rehabilitated and repainted purple.

In September 2023, plans were announced by Manhattan borough president Mark Levine to replace the South Street Viaduct with an urban boulevard. This would only occur if funding is obtained. As stated by Levine, it "is the least heavily used part of the FDR and it has created a noisy uglier barrier between the people of lower Manhattan and their waterfront". The structure has also deteriorated significantly, requiring more maintenance than is deemed acceptable.

== Transportation ==
The SIM3, SIM6, SIM10, SIM11, SIM31, X37 and X38 express buses use FDR Drive between its start in Lower Manhattan and 23rd Street. In addition, the QM7, QM8, QM8 Super Express, QM11 and QM25 use FDR Drive between the Brooklyn Bridge exit and 34th Street

The BM1, BM2, BM3 and BM4 buses use the FDR between Brooklyn Bridge and 23rd Street during the off-peak hours, but during the peak hour, "Midtown Express" buses skip Downtown, running directly up the FDR to 23rd.

== Exit list ==
The entire route is in the New York City borough of Manhattan.

Location	mi	km	Exit	Destinations	Notes
Battery Park City	0.00	0.00	–	NY 9A north (West Street) / Hugh L. Carey Tunnel (I-478 Toll south) to I-278 – Brooklyn	Southern terminus; exit 1 on West Side Highway
Battery Park	0.1– 0.5	0.16– 0.80	Battery Park Underpass		
Financial District	0.6	0.97	1	South Street – Battery Park, Staten Island Ferry	South Street not signed southbound; all trucks must exit
Two Bridges	1.41	2.27	2	Brooklyn Bridge – Manhattan Civic Center	Access to Civic Center via Pearl Street
Two Bridges	2.4	3.9	3	South Street – Manhattan Bridge	Southbound exit and northbound entrance
Lower East Side	2.6	4.2	4	Grand Street – Williamsburg Bridge	Southbound exit and entrance
Lower East Side	3.09	4.97	5	East Houston Street – Williamsburg Bridge	Formerly signed for Holland Tunnel
East Village	3.70	5.95	6	East 15th Street	Southbound exit and entrance; permanently closed in 2002 due to post-9/11 security concerns
Peter Cooper Village	4.30	6.92	7	East 20th Street / East 23rd Street	East 20th Street not signed southbound; also serves Avenue C
Kips Bay	4.6	7.4	–	East 30th Street	Southbound entrance only
Murray Hill	4.86	7.82	8	East 34th Street to I-495 east (Queens–Midtown Tunnel)	
Murray Hill	4.9	7.9	9	East 42nd Street	Northbound exit only
Midtown East	5.2– 5.5	8.4– 8.9	Tunnel under United Nations Headquarters		
Midtown East	5.6	9.0	10	East 49th Street	Southbound exit and northbound entrance
Sutton Place	5.8	9.3	11	East 53rd Street	Southbound exit only
Sutton Place	5.8– 6.1	9.3– 9.8	Tunnel under Sutton Place		
Upper East Side	6.1– 6.3	9.8– 10.1	12	East 61st Street / East 63rd Street to NY 25 east (Queensboro Bridge)	Signed for 61st Street northbound, 63rd Street southbound
Upper East Side	6.3– 6.7	10.1– 10.8	Tunnel under Rockefeller University / NewYork–Presbyterian Hospital / Hospital for Special Surgery		
Upper East Side	6.7	10.8	13	East 71st Street	Southbound exit and entrance
Yorkville	7.0	11.3	–	East 79th Street	Southbound entrance only
Yorkville	7.2– 7.6	11.6– 12.2	Tunnel under Carl Schurz Park		
East Harlem	7.96	12.81	14	East 96th Street	Also serves East 97th Street and York Avenue
East Harlem	8.63	13.89	15	East 106th Street	Southbound exit and entrance
East Harlem	9.15	14.73	16	East 116th Street	Southbound exit only
East Harlem	9.68	15.58	17	RFK Bridge (NY 900G south) to I-278 / Grand Central Parkway east – Bruckner Expressway	Also serves Randall's Island
East Harlem	9.68	15.58	–	Harlem River Drive north / Willis Avenue Bridge to I-87 north (Major Deegan Expressway) – George Washington Bridge	Continuation north
1.000 mi = 1.609 km; 1.000 km = 0.621 mi: Closed/former; Electronic toll collection; Incomplete access

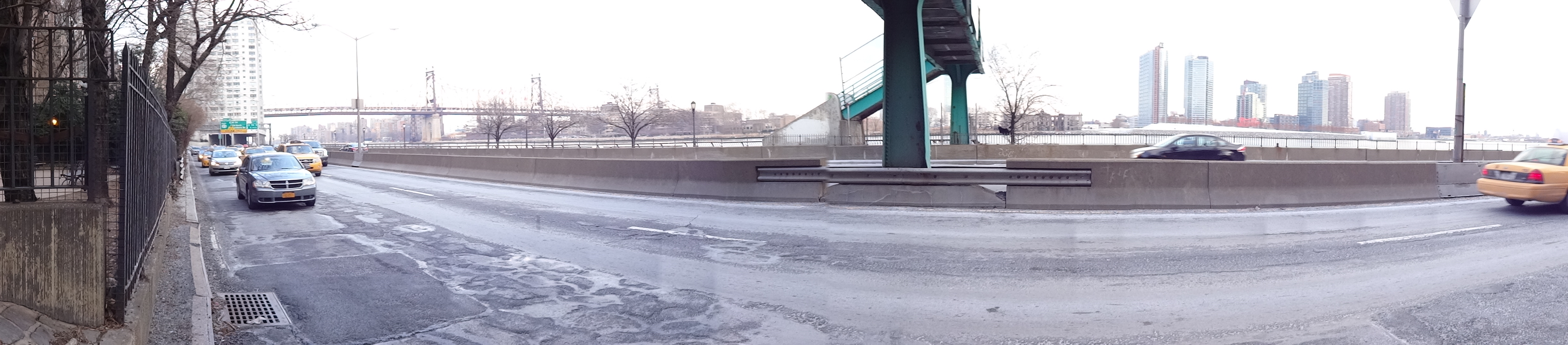
FDR Drive near the Ed Koch Queensboro Bridge
