= Courtlandt Nicoll =

American politician

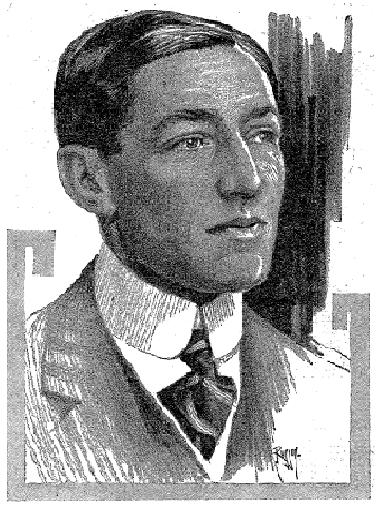
- Nicoll, 1912

Member of the New York State Senate
- In office 1925–1926
- Preceded by: Ogden L. Mills
- Succeeded by: Julius Miller
- In office 1918–1918
- Preceded by: Meyer Levy
- Succeeded by: Abraham Greenberg

Personal details
- Born: December 2, 1880 Manhattan, New York City, U.S.
- Died: September 20, 1938 (aged 57) Water Mill, New York, U.S.
- Party: Republican
- Spouse: Ione Page (m. 1911)
- Children: 4
- Parent(s): Benjamin Nicoll; Grace Davison Lord
- Relatives: De Lancey Nicoll (uncle)
- Education: St. Paul's School
- Alma mater: Princeton University; New York Law School

Courtlandt Nicoll (December 2, 1880, in New York City – September 20, 1938, in Water Mill, Suffolk County, New York) was an American lawyer and politician from New York.

== Early life ==
He was the son of Benjamin Nicoll (1855–1921) and Grace Davison (née Lord) Nicoll. His younger sister, Elsie Nicoll (1887–1947), married John Sloane, Jr. (1883–1971), chairman of W. & J. Sloane, in 1917. the nephew of William D. Sloan and Emily Thorn Vanderbilt. His father was a coal and steel merchant who, upon his 1921 death, left his estate three-fifths to Courtlandt and two-fifths to his sister Elsie, after providing for a $850,000 trust for their mother.

His paternal grandparents were Solomon Townsend Nicoll (1813–1864) and Charlotte Anne Nicoll (1827–1891). Nicoll's uncle was De Lancey Nicoll (1854–1931), the New York County District Attorney. He was a direct descendant of Matthias Nicoll, an English lawyer, who emigrated to America with his uncle, Sir Richard Nicholls, the first Governor of the English Province of New York following Dutch rule under Peter Stuyvesant, in 1664. His maternal grandfather was James Couper Lord, son of Daniel Lord.

He attended St. Paul's School in Concord, New Hampshire. He graduated A.B. from Princeton University in 1903; and from New York Law School in 1905.

== Career ==
He was an Alderman (28th D.) of New York City from 1911 to 1913.

Nicoll was a member of the New York State Senate (17th D.) in 1918; and was Chairman of the Committee on Penal Institutions.

He was again a member of the State Senate in 1925 and 1926. In 1925, he sponsored legislation which forced New York City to use voting machines at subsequent elections. In November 1926, he was defeated for re-election by Democrat Abraham Greenberg. At the opening of the next session in January 1927, Nicoll contested Greenberg's election, but after long drawn out proceedings Greenberg's election was upheld in February 1928.

== Personal life ==
On April 19, 1911, he married Ione Page (d. 1940), who served as Vice Chairman of the Women's Organization for National Prohibition Reform; and a delegate to the New York State Convention to Ratify the 21st Amendment in 1933. She was the daughter of Howard Page (d. 1925), who was associated with the Standard Oil Company, and Mildred A. (née Mitchell) Page (d. 1937). Together, they were the parents of five children:

- Mildred Nicoll (1913–1982), who married Charles Ellwood Rauch in 1940.
- Courtlandt Nicoll Jr. (1916–1995), who married Kathryna Hoffman Ray (1924–2004) in 1944. They divorced and he married Nancy C. Woods (b. 1927) in 1958.
- Eileen Nicoll (1922–2001), who married Floyd Kirk Haskell (1916–1998), who later served as a United States senator from Colorado, in 1941.
- Benjamin Nicoll (b. 1926)

He was President of the Board of Trustees of the Museum of the City of New York from December 1935 to February 1938.

He died in his sleep on September 20, 1938, at his country home in Water Mill, New York, of coronary thrombosis. His widow died on August 9, 1940, after falling down 16 stories from a room in New York Hospital. Her funeral was attended by Mayor LaGuardia and David Rockefeller.

New York State Senate
Preceded by Ogden L. Mills	New York State Senate; 17th District; 1918	Succeeded by Julius Miller
Preceded by Meyer Levy	New York State Senate; 17th District; 1925–1926	Succeeded by Abraham Greenberg
