= Death Avenue =

Nickname associated with dangerous avenues in Manhattan

"Death Avenue" was a nickname given to both Tenth and Eleventh Avenues on the west side of Manhattan, New York City in the 19th century.

In 1847, the City of New York authorized the construction of railroad tracks along Tenth and Eleventh Avenues on Manhattan's West Side. The street-level tracks were used by the New York Central Railroad's freight trains, which shipped commodities such as coal, dairy products and beef. For safety the railroad hired "West Side cowboys", men who rode horses and waved flags in front of the trains. However, so many accidents occurred between freight trains and other traffic that the nickname "Death Avenue" was given to Tenth and Eleventh Avenues. In 1910, one organization estimated that there had been 548 deaths and 1,574 injuries over the years along Eleventh Avenue.

Public debate about the hazard began during the early 1900s. In 1929, the city, the state, and New York Central agreed on the West Side Improvement Project, conceived by Robert Moses. The 13-mile (21 km) project eliminated 105 street-level railroad crossings and added 32 acres (13 ha) to Riverside Park; it also included construction of the West Side Elevated Highway and the West Side Line elevated viaduct. It cost more than $150 million (equivalent to $2.75 billion in 2024). The last stretch of street-level track was removed from Eleventh Avenue in 1941.
