= Joseph Steinberg =

American politician (1883-1932)

- Born: April 22, 1883; Manasquan, New Jersey
- Died: November 27, 1932 (aged 49)
- Education: New York University School of Law
- Occupations: Lawyer, politician
- Political party: Republican

Joseph Steinberg (April 22, 1883 – November 27, 1932) was an American lawyer and politician from New York.

== Early life ==
He was born on April 22, 1883, in Manasquan, New Jersey, and attended Manasquan High School. He graduated from the City College of New York and the New York University School of Law. He practiced law in Manhattan.

== Politics ==
In November 1913, Steinberg ran on the Progressive ticket for the New York State Assembly (New York Co., 26th D.), but Democrat Abraham Greenberg was declared elected by a small margin. Steinberg contested Greenberg's election, and was seated on March 27, the day before the regular session adjourned sine die, in the 137th New York State Legislature. In November 1914, Steinberg was re-elected on the Progressive and Republican tickets and was a member of the 138th New York State Legislature in 1915. In November 1915, Steinberg ran for re-election, but was defeated by Democrat Meyer Levy. Levy polled 2,885 votes; Steinberg polled 2,673 votes, and August Claessens polled 1,207.

Steinberg was a Republican member of the State Assembly (New York Co., 15th D.) in 1919, 1920, 1921, 1922, 1923 and 1924; and was Chairman of the Committee on Claims in 1921 and 1922. In 1921, he got engaged to Rhoda Weinstein.

== Death ==
He died on November 27, 1932.

New York State Assembly
Preceded by Abraham Greenberg	New York State Assembly; New York County, 26th District; 1914–1915	Succeeded by Meyer Levy
Preceded by Schuyler M. Meyer	New York State Assembly; New York County, 15th District; 1919–1924	Succeeded by Samuel H. Hofstadter
