= Schuyler M. Meyer =

American politician (1885–1970)

Schuyler Merritt Meyer (October 27, 1885 in New York City – June 21, 1970 in Dover, New Hampshire) was an American lawyer and politician from New York.

== Life ==
He was the son of Charles Barnard Meyer and Virginia H. (Hoyt) Meyer. He graduated A.B. from Yale College in 1907. He graduated LL.B. from New York Law School in 1910, and practiced law in New York City.

Meyer was a Progressive member of the New York State Assembly (New York Co., 27th D.) in 1914. On September 19, 1914, he married Helen Martin, and they had several children. In November 1914, he ran for re-election and, as part of his campaign, sent discount coupons to all registered voters in the poorer parts of his assembly district.

He was a Republican member of the State Assembly in 1917 and 1918. In November 1918, he ran for the State Senate, but was defeated by Democrat Julius Miller. In November 1920, he defeated Miller for re-election, and was a member of the New York State Senate (17th D.) in 1921 and 1922.

Later he lived in Hanover, New Hampshire; and died on June 22, 1970, at a nursing home in Dover, New Hampshire.

His son Schuyler Merritt Meyer, Jr. (1918–1997) was Chairman of the Edwin Gould Foundation for Children.

== Sources ==
- TRADING COUPON FOR VOTER, LATEST CAMPAIGN NOVELTY in New York Tribune on October 30, 1914
- GUIDE FOR VOTERS BY CITIZENS UNION in NYT on October 28, 1917
- NOMINEES ANALYZED BY CITIZENS UNION in NYT on October 27, 1918
- SCHUYLER M. MEYER, RETIRED LAWYER, 84 in NYT on June 23, 1970 (subscription required)
- Schuyler Meyer, 79, Foundation Chief And Entrepreneur in NYT on November 12, 1997

New York State Assembly
Preceded by Raymond B. Carver	New York State Assembly; New York County, 27th District; 1914	Succeeded by Charles E. Rice, Jr.
Preceded by Hoffman Nickerson	New York State Assembly; New York County, 27th District; 1917	Succeeded by district abolished
Preceded by Abram Ellenbogen	New York State Assembly; New York County, 15th District; 1918	Succeeded by Joseph Steinberg
New York State Senate
Preceded by Julius Miller	New York State Senate; 17th District; 1921–1922	Succeeded by Meyer Levy
