= Julius Miller =

American politician

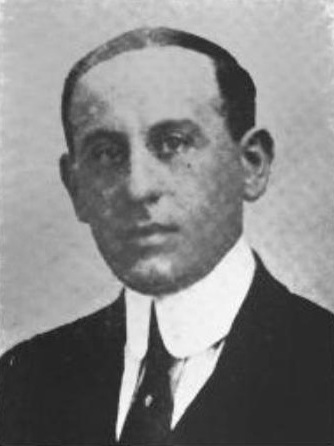
Julius Miller, Manhattan Borough President, Justice of the New York Supreme Court.

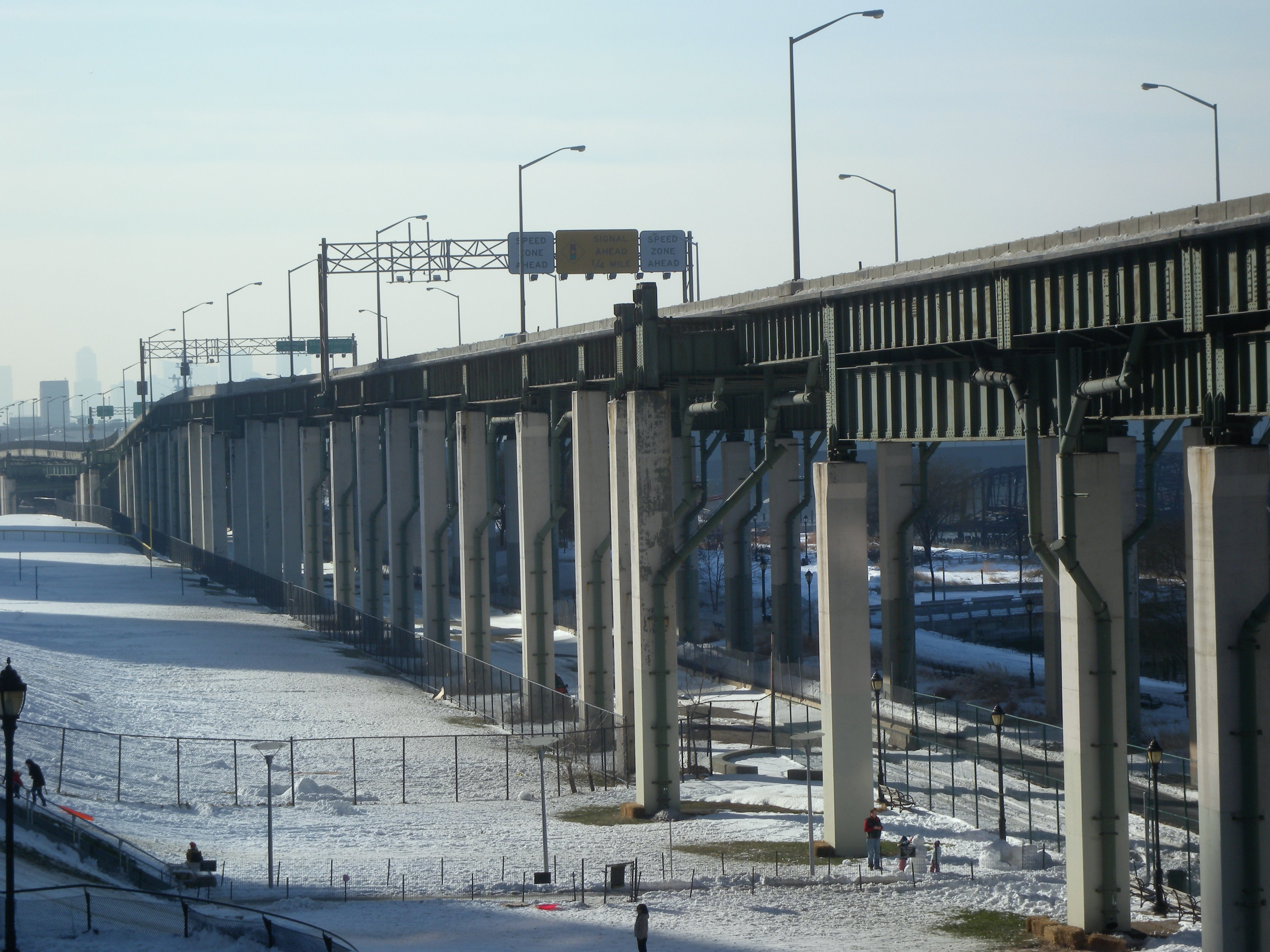
Miller Highway

Julius Miller (January 12, 1880 – February 3, 1955) was a judge and politician in New York City. He was a public figure for four decades, serving as Manhattan Borough President from 1922 to 1930, and as a New York State Supreme Court judge from 1933 to 1950. He is best remembered for pushing through the West Side Elevated Highway from 72nd Street to the tip of Manhattan.

== Career ==
He graduated from New York Law School and became an attorney in 1901. Miller was a member of the New York State Senate (17th D.) in 1919 and 1920. He was borough president of Manhattan from 1922 to 1930. In 1924 he was an alternate delegate to the 1924 Democratic National Convention. In 1933 he became a justice of the New York Supreme Court (1st D.), and served until 1950.

As borough president, he promoted the construction of the Park Avenue Viaduct through the New York Central Building and around Grand Central Terminal, the establishment of the center strip on Park Avenue, and the replacing of the Sixth Avenue elevated train. As a judge, Miller claimed the distinction of never having been reversed by an appellate court on any of the cases in equity where he decided suits without a jury. This was believed to be unique among New York jurists. Upon retirement, he was replaced by Justice Samuel Gold.

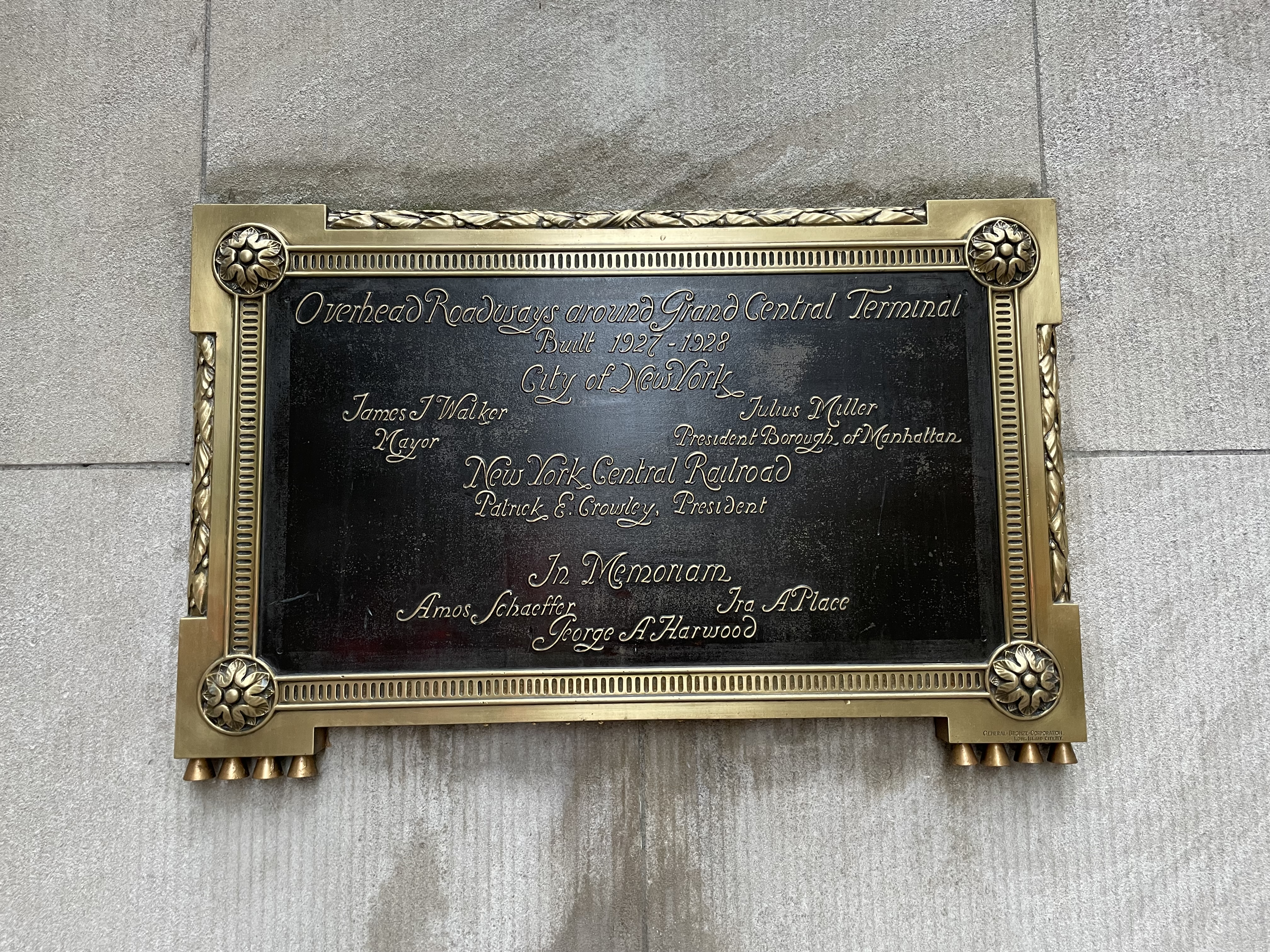
Grand Central Terminal Plaque

In 1930, Miller received The Hundred Year Association of New York's Gold Medal Award "in recognition of outstanding contributions to the City of New York."

== Later life ==
Miller was Jewish.

Miller had a summer home in Far Rockaway, which later was incorporated into the campuses of two Orthodox Jewish schools, the Hebrew Institute of Long Island and Yeshiva Darchei Torah.

The New York Daily News listed him as deceased three years before his death.

Miller retired in 1950, and died at his home in New York City on February 3, 1955. His funeral was attended by over 400 people.

== Legacy ==
New York Route 9A, the "West Side Highway," is the direct replacement for the Miller Highway ("West Side Elevated Highway") that was named after Julius Miller.

Miller was instrumental in finishing the Park Avenue Viaduct, an elevated stretch of Manhattan's Park Avenue that carries vehicles around and through buildings that sit on the normal path of the roadbed. The Park Avenue Viaduct remains in use as of 2022, and is designated a National Historic Landmark,

New York State Senate
Preceded by Courtlandt Nicoll	New York State Senate; 17th District; 1919–1920	Succeeded by Schuyler M. Meyer
Political offices
Preceded by Henry H. Curran	Borough President of Manhattan; 1922–1930	Succeeded by Samuel Levy
