= Meyer Levy =

American lawyer and politician

Meyer Levy (May 16, 1887 – January 26, 1967 in Manhattan, New York City) was an American lawyer and Democratic politician from New York.

== Life ==
He was a member of the New York State Assembly (New York Co., 26th D.) in 1916 and 1917.

He was a member of the New York State Senate (17th D.) in 1923 and 1924; and was Chairman of the Committee on General Laws.

He died on January 26, 1967, in Park East Hospital at East 83rd Street in Manhattan.

== Sources ==
- LEVY'S PLURALITY 2,229 in NYT on December 7, 1922
- BRONX BAR HEADS ELECTED in NYT on January 10, 1935 (subscription required)
- MEYER LEVY DIES, EX-STATE SENATOR in NYT on January 27, 1967 (subscription required)

New York State Assembly
Preceded by Joseph Steinberg	New York State Assembly; New York County, 26th District; 1916–1917	Succeeded by district abolished
New York State Senate
Preceded by Schuyler M. Meyer	New York State Senate; 17th District; 1923–1924	Succeeded by Courtlandt Nicoll
