= Battery Park Underpass =

Tunnel in Manhattan, New York

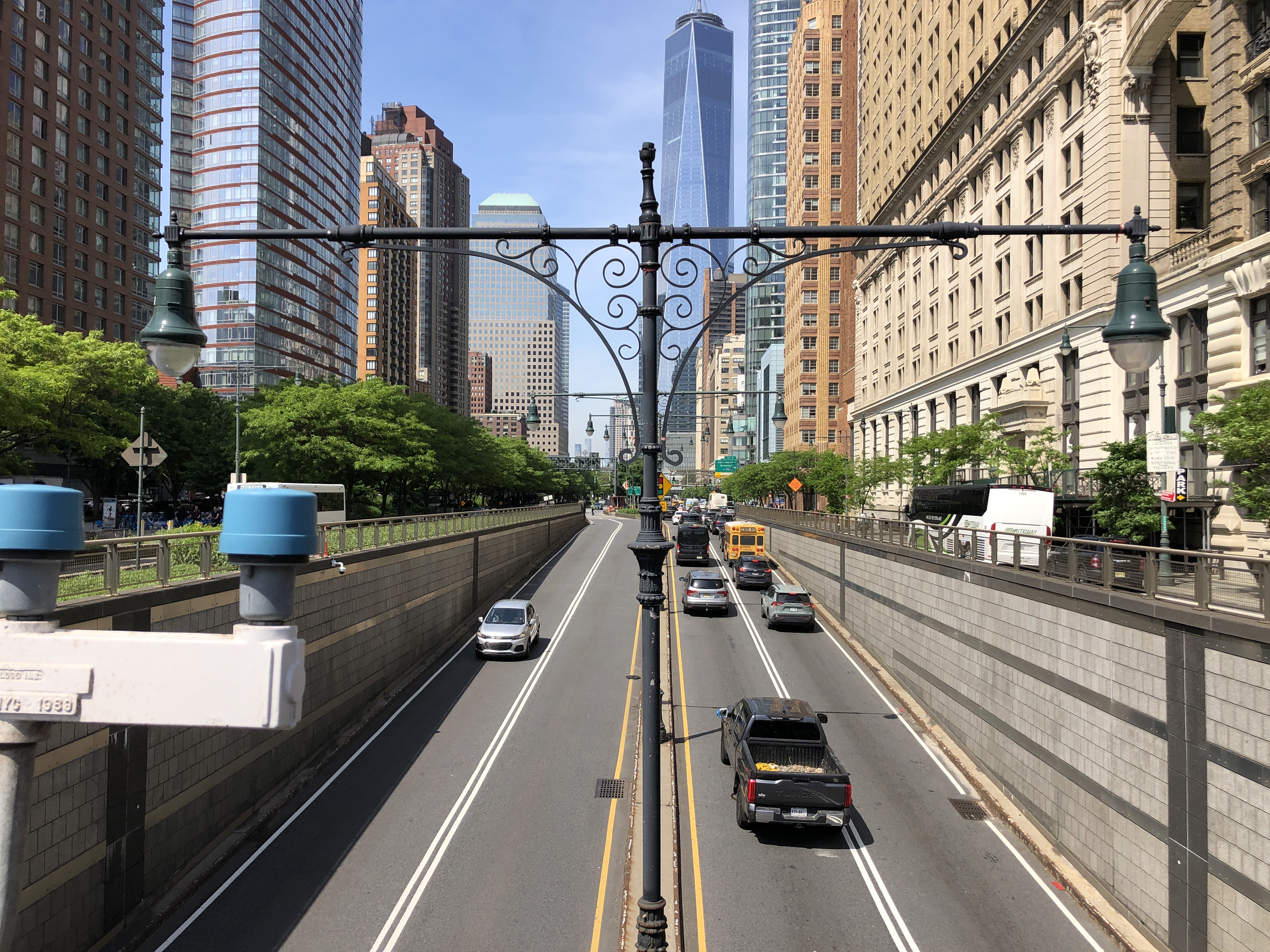
- Western portal at West Street
- Interactive map of Battery Park Underpass

Overview
- Location: Battery Park, Manhattan, New York City
- Coordinates: 40°42′09″N 74°00′58″W
- Route: FDR Drive
- Start: FDR Drive / South Street in Financial District
- End: NY 9A / West Side Highway in Battery Park City

Operation
- Constructed: 1949–1951
- Opened: April 10, 1951
- Closed: October 29, 2012
- Reopened: November 13, 2012
- Traffic: Automotive

Technical
- No. of lanes: 4
- Operating speed: 30–40 miles per hour (48–64 km/h)
- Tunnel clearance: 12 feet 7 inches (3.84 m)

The Battery Park Underpass is a vehicular tunnel at the southernmost tip of Manhattan, New York City, near the neighborhoods of South Ferry and Battery Park City. The tunnel connects FDR Drive, which runs along the east side of Manhattan Island, with the West Side Highway (New York State Route 9A, or NY 9A), which runs along the island's west side. Opened in 1951, it was the second section of FDR Drive to be completed. The underpass crosses beneath the Battery (formerly Battery Park) and the approach to the Brooklyn–Battery Tunnel.

== History ==
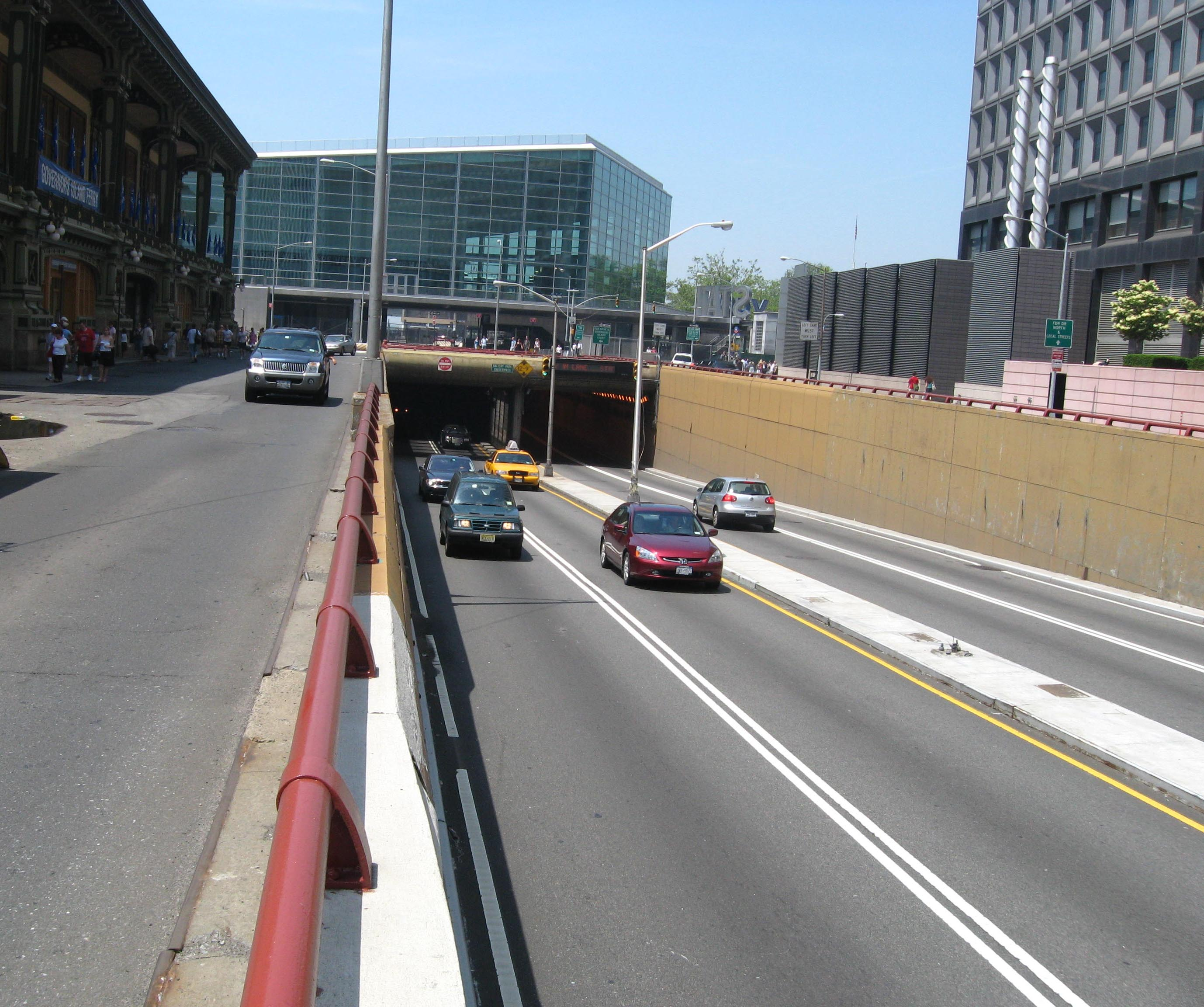
Eastern portal at the FDR Drive in front of the Battery Maritime Building, 2008

The underpass started construction in 1949 and opened to the public on April 10, 1951. The underpass runs underneath the Battery, connecting the West Side Highway to the South Street Viaduct with two lanes of traffic in each direction. The project was completed shortly after the opening of the Brooklyn-Battery Tunnel in 1950, and provides direct access between the West Side Highway and FDR Drive.

In 2005, during the reconstruction of NY 9A, the western end of the Battery Park Underpass was extended to the north by about 25 feet (7.6 m) to provide a U-turn lane and amenities for pedestrians and bicyclists.

During Hurricane Sandy, the tunnel was filled with seawater and required major repairs.

=== Plans for extension ===
There have been three proposals to extend the tunnel north on the FDR Drive side.

- In 1971, it was suggested that the South Street Viaduct be turned into a tunnel, essentially extending the underpass north to the Brooklyn Bridge
- In 2002, the Downtown Alliance, the local business improvement district, called for a 350-foot (105 m) extension to the underpass to create a plaza in front of the Battery Maritime Building. The estimated cost was $70 million.
- In 2005, Mayor Michael Bloomberg also called for an extension of the underpass near the Battery Maritime Building as part of a plan to rehabilitate the South Street Viaduct.
