= Abraham Greenberg =

American politician

New York State Senate
- In office 1927–1928

New York State Assembly
- In office 1908-1908; 1913-1914

Personal details
- Born: August 22, 1881 New York City, New York, USA
- Died: May 10, 1941 (aged 59) Manhattan, New York, USA
- Party: Democratic Party

Abraham Greenberg (August 22, 1881, in New York City – May 10, 1941, in Manhattan, New York City) was an American lawyer and politician from New York.

== Life ==
Greenberg attended the public schools. In 1903, he began to practice law in New York City.

Greenberg was a member of the New York State Assembly (New York Co., 31st D.) in 1908.

He was again a member of the State Assembly (New York Co., 26th D.) in 1913, and was one of the Managers (i.e. assemblymen who acted as prosecutors) at the impeachment trial of Governor William Sulzer.

Greenberg was declared elected to the 137th New York State Legislature, and sat through the whole regular session while his election was contested by Progressive Joseph Steinberg. On March 27, 1914, the day before the annual adjournment sine die, Steinberg was seated in place of Greenberg.

Greenberg was a member of the New York State Senate (17th D.) in 1927 and 1928. His election was unsuccessfully contested by Republican Courtlandt Nicoll.

He died on May 10, 1941, in the Rockefeller Institute in Manhattan.

New York State Assembly
| Preceded by Philip Reece | New York State Assembly; New York County, 31st District; 1908 | Succeeded by Samuel Marks |
| Preceded by Abram Goodman | New York State Assembly; New York County, 26th District; 1913–1914 | Succeeded by Joseph Steinberg |
New York State Senate
| Preceded by Courtlandt Nicoll | New York State Senate; 17th District; 1927–1928 | Succeeded by Samuel H. Hofstadter |
