= Annabelle Selldorf =

German-born architect

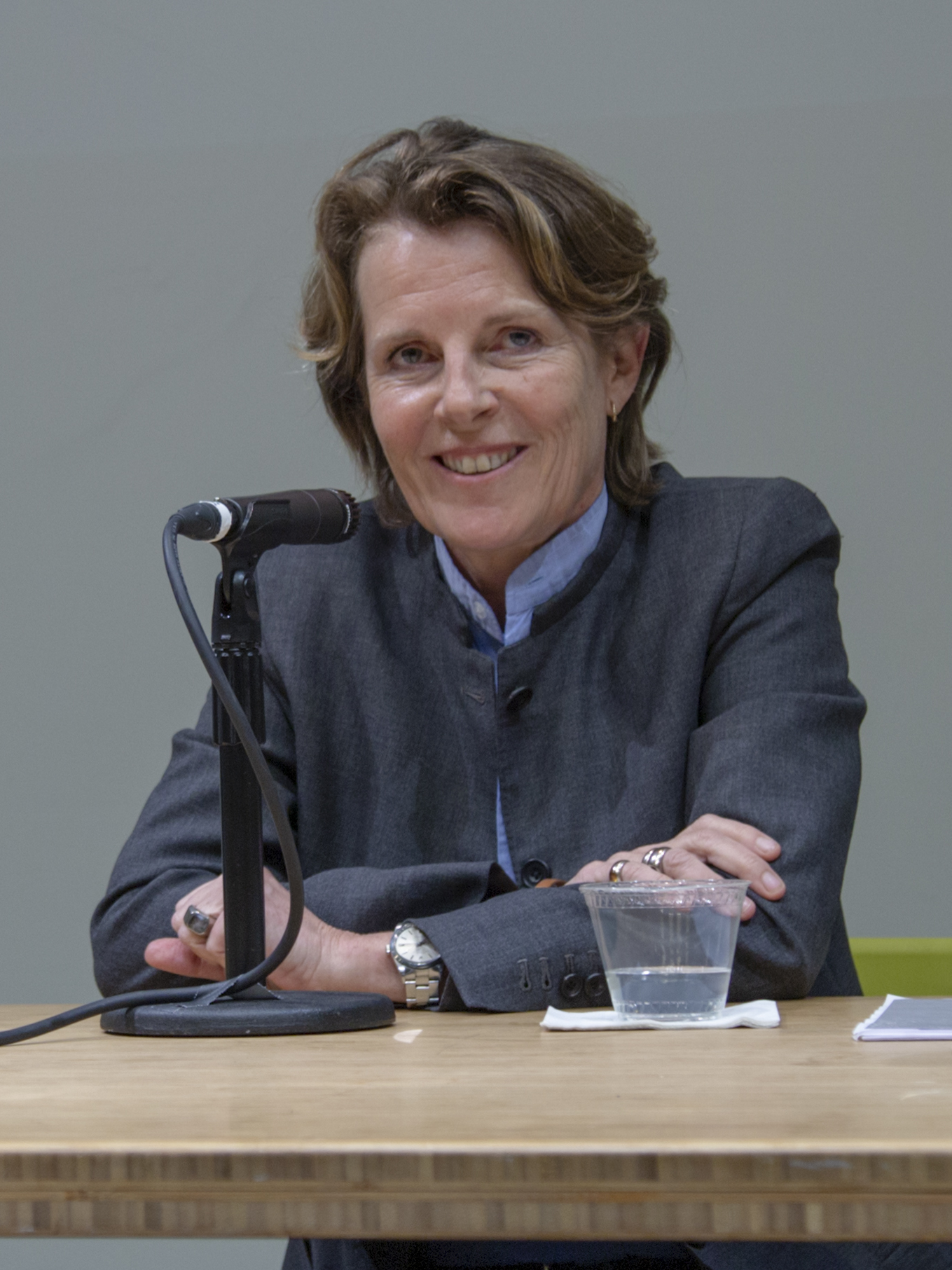
- Selldorf at Columbia University GSAPP in 2019
- Born: July 5, 1960 (age 66); Cologne, Germany
- Education: Pratt Institute; Syracuse University

Annabelle Selldorf (born July 5, 1960) is a German-born architect and founding principal of Selldorf Architects, a New York City-based architecture practice. She is a fellow of the American Institute of Architects (FAIA), the recipient of the 2016 AIANY Medal of Honor and in 2025 was named one of TIME 100 most influential people. Her projects include the Sunset Park Material Recovery Facility, Neue Galerie New York, The Rubell Museum, a renovation of the Sterling and Francine Clark Art Institute, David Zwirner's 20th Street Gallery, The Mwabwindo School, 21 East 12th Street, 200 11th Avenue, 10 Bond Street, and several buildings for the LUMA Foundation's contemporary art center in Arles, France.

Other notable projects include an expansion of the Frick Collection, the renovation of the National Gallery in London, the Museum of Contemporary Art San Diego, Hauser & Wirth's new gallery on 22nd street in Chelsea, a new greenhouse and renovation of the historic greenhouse at Dumbarton Oaks, and an Interpretation Center at the Qianlong Garden in the Forbidden City in Beijing, China. Selldorf Architects was recently selected as one of five shortlisted firms for the Louvre Nouvelle Renaissance architecture competition.

== Early life and education ==
Selldorf was born on July 5, 1960, in Cologne, Germany. While growing up, she was inspired heavily by both her father, Herbert Selldorf, and his subtle architectural approach as well as modernist tradition. At the age of 12, Selldorf's father purchased a house in Cologne, Germany, making tiny adjustments to the lighting, furniture, and wall color that formed the foundation for her own architectural approach. Selldorf also found inspiration in Ludwig Mies Van Der Rohe's designs, citing his 1930 Tugendhat House in Brno, Czech Republic as typifying a balance of daily living and design.

Selldorf moved to New York City in 1980. She received her Bachelor of Architecture degree from Pratt Institute in New York and worked briefly for architect Richard Gluckman, then earned a Master of Architecture degree from Syracuse University in Florence, Italy. In 2025, Selldorf received an Honorary Doctor of Arts from Pratt University.

== Career ==
=== Selldorf Architects ===
Selldorf explains in an article for Architectural Digest that she did not want to be an architect growing up. Her father was an architect, and he eventually recommended she work for a contractor. This experience sparked her interest to pursue the profession. As she moved into more traditional workspaces, many of her projects involved balancing both interior design and architectural endeavors for private and residential clients.

Selldorf founded her first independent practice in 1988, which today employs upwards of 65 employees. Her company is present in four continents. In 2004, Selldorf established Vica, a company to sell her own furniture; she named it after the design firm founded by her grandmother in Cologne in the 1930s.

Selldorf is a popular architect in the art world, designing gallery spaces, museums, and homes for both artists and collectors. She has designed gallery and exhibition spaces for Hauser & Wirth, the Whitney, Gladstone Gallery, Michael Werner, David Zwirner, Acquavella Galleries and Frieze Art Fair's Frieze Masters. Her firm routinely collaborates with the Gagosian Gallery on exhibition designs. Her clients also include Christophe Van de Weghe and Per Skarstedt.

Selldorf's approach to design has been described in the Wall Street Journal as "...about restrained and understated elegance. From reinvented Beaux-Arts galleries to handsome residential towers, the Selldorf statement goes against the grain." Her work has also been praised by Paul Goldberger, Architecture Critic for The New Yorker as "...a kind of gentle modernism of utter precision, with perfect proportions." In another article by Architectural Digest, Selldorf describes her design process—as demonstrated in her work on a Fifth Avenue apartment—as focusing on "unconscious comfort" and "clean and clear space." In The New York Times, architecture critic Michael Kimmelman praised Selldorf’s expansion of the Frick Collection, writing that it is “about as sensitive and deft as one could hope for. At moments, as in a voluptuous new marble staircase and airy auditorium, it approximates poetry.”

=== Teaching ===
Selldorf is a fellow of the American Institute of Architects, a member of the American Academy of Arts and Letters and an Academician of the National Academy Museum and School. She has taught at Harvard University’s Graduate School of Design and Syracuse University and is a frequent juror and lecturer.

== Other activities ==
- Architectural League of New York, Member of the Board
- Center for Curatorial Studies and Art in Contemporary Culture, Bard College, Member of the Board of Governors
- Chinati Foundation, Member of the Board of Trustees
- Museum Berggruen, Member of the International Council
- World Monuments Fund, Member of the Board of Trustees

== Recognition ==
- 2025 – Jacqueline Kennedy Onassis Medal, award by the Municipal Arts Society of New York
- 2018 – Lawrence Israel Prize, awarded by the Interior Design program at Fashion Institute of Technology (FIT)
- 2016 – AIANY Medal of Honor, awarded by the American Institute of Architects New York Chapter
- 2014 – Award in Architecture, awarded by the American Academy of Arts and Letters

== Personal life ==
As of 2015, Selldorf lived in Greenwich Village with her partner, Tom Outerbridge.

== Selected projects ==
- The Frick Collection
- The National Gallery
- One Domino Square
- Art Gallery of Ontario
- Sunset Park Material Recovery Facility
- Neue Galerie New York: Museum for German and Austrian Art
- The Mwabwindo School
- The Rubell Museum
- Sterling and Francine Clark Art Institute
- Steinway Hall
- Institute for the Study of the Ancient World
- 200 11th Avenue
- 10 Bond Street
- 21 East 12th Street
- 347 Bowery Street
- 42 Crosby Street
- 520 West 19th Street
- Interior design for the Urban Glass House, 330 Spring Street, Manhattan, 2005.
- David Zwirner
- Hauser & Wirth
- Gladstone Gallery
- Haunch of Venison
- Acquavella Galleries
- Michael Werner Gallery
- Museum of Contemporary Art San Diego
- Oak Room and Oak Bar at the Plaza Hotel
- Abercrombie & Fitch Flagship Stores in New York, London, Milan, Paris, Copenhagen and Tokyo
- John Hay Library at Brown University

=== Projects in New York City ===
==== Sunset Park Material Recovery Center ====
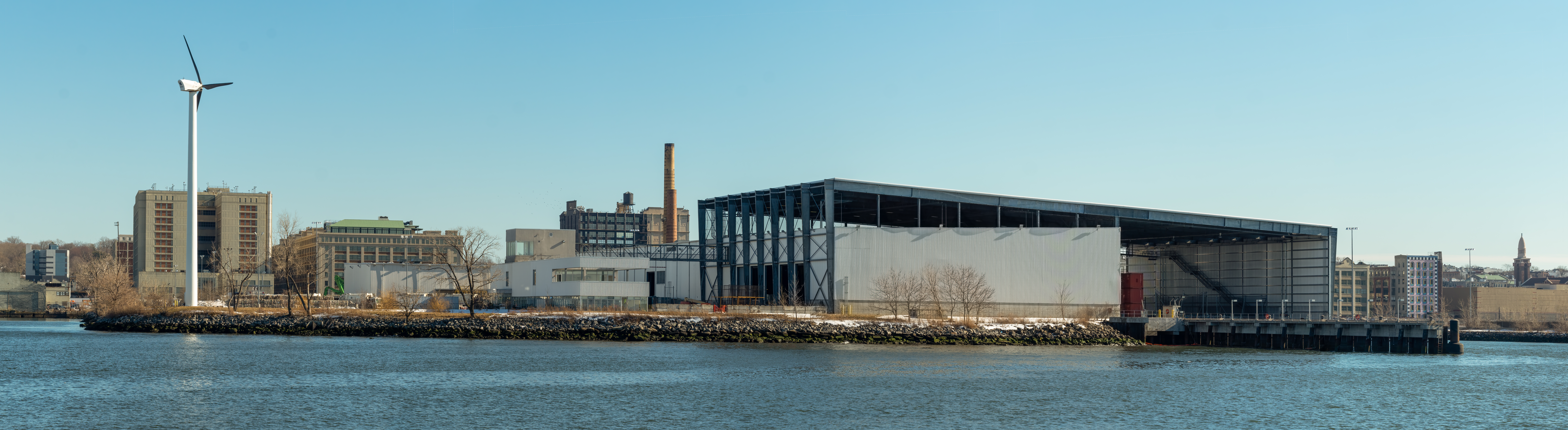
Sunset Park Material Recovery Facility

In 2010, New York City Mayor Michael Bloomberg honored Selldorf's firm with a Public Design Commission Award for the design of the Sunset Park Material Recovery Facility a processing center for New York City's curbside metal, glass, and plastic recyclables. Michael Kimmelman reviewed the building in the New York Times: "Selldorf was, in retrospect, an inspired choice. The German-born Annabelle Selldorf runs the firm, which stresses crisp lines, elegant volumes and a clean, formal vocabulary in which nothing goes to waste." The Sunset Park Material Recovery Facility is also a winning site of Built by Women New York City, a competition launched by the Beverly Willis Architecture Foundation during the fall of 2014, to identify outstanding and diverse sites and spaces designed, engineered and built by women.

The Sunset Park Material Recovery Center opened on the eleven-acre 29th Street Pier in the South Brooklyn Marine Terminal in December 2013. The plant, built by Sims Municipal Recycling and the City of New York, “is the largest and most sophisticated plant for commingled (mix of metal, glass, and plastic) residential recyclables in North America.” Selldorf Architects created an expressive design for the complex by placing structural components of the pre-engineered buildings on their exterior.

The complex's multi-building design near the mouth of the East River l is meant to optimize functionality while keeping aesthetics in mind. All aspects of the complex's design keep sustainability in mind. First, the location along the water, and 850 feet of dock space, mean the complex can transport commingled recyclables in and out of the center by barge rather than by truck, cutting the center's carbon footprint. With an understanding that the more environmentally friendly option (barge transport rather than truck) still has negative impacts on the location's aquatic environment, the Center installed fuzzy ropes alongside its mooring pier to support mussels, which purify water. Recycled materials were used throughout; as, site fill is a composite of materials taken from the Second Avenue subway, recycled steel comprises the buildings, and the complex's plazas are finished with recycled glass. The addition of New York City's first commercial wind turbine and a large solar array not only allow the center to lower operational costs, but also keep sustainability in mind. Last, the inclusion of an educational center means the complex can educate the city on the importance of recycling.

==== 10 Bond Street ====
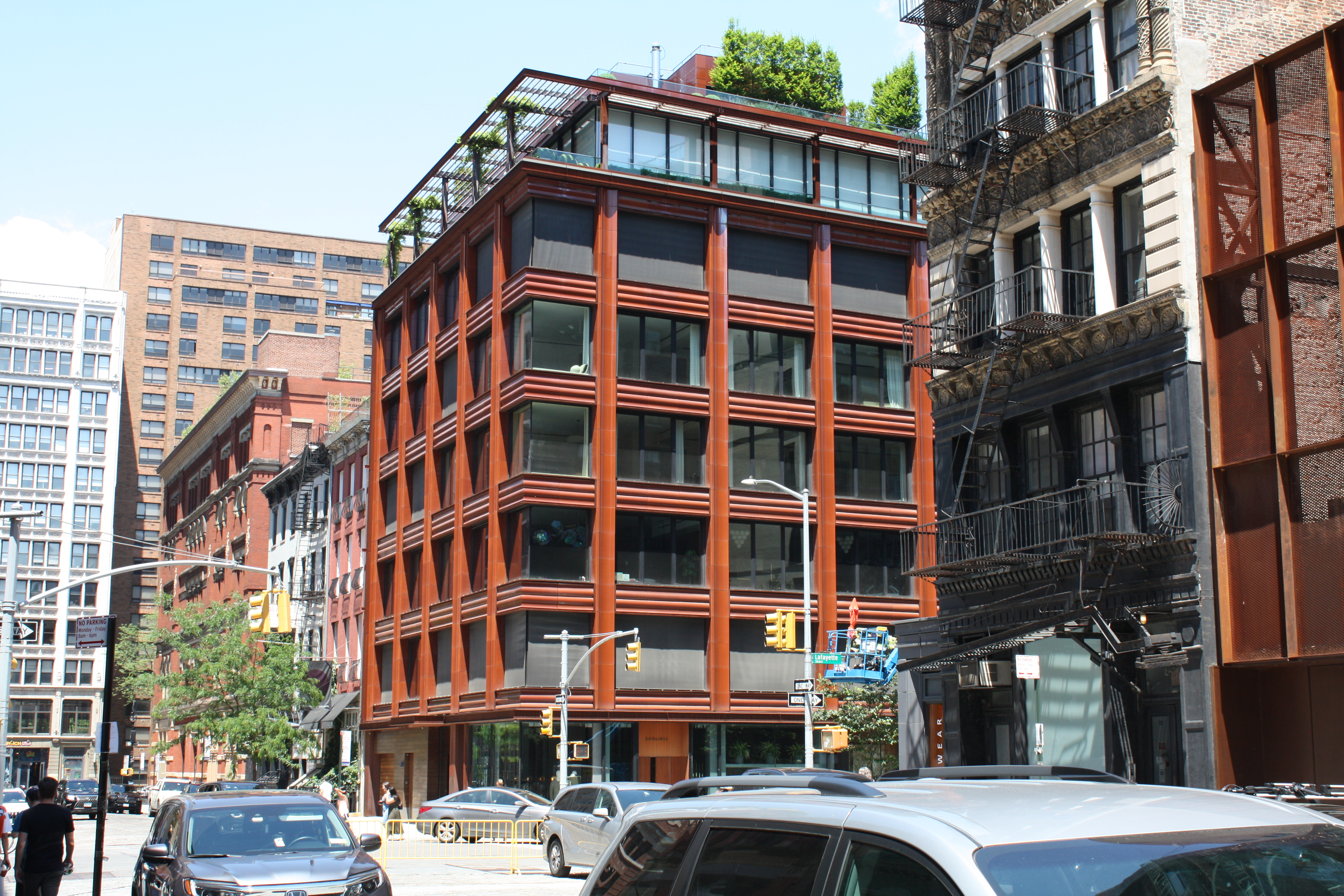
10 Bond Street in 2022

Completed in 2016, the 10 Bond is a residential building on the corner of Lafayette and Bond Street in the NoHo neighborhood of Manhattan. The seven-story residential structure is in line with the rooflines of the rest of the area, but its exterior, composed of prefabricated terracotta sections, weathered steel, glass, and wood, sets it apart from the neighborhood's other low-rise buildings.

10 Bond Street comprises eleven residential units, including multiple two-bedroom and three-bedroom condominiums, a three-bedroom duplex townhouse, and a three-bedroom penthouse. One of the two-bedroom residence's interiors was designed by Selldorf Architects, featuring warm-toned mid century furniture to play off of the modern architectural elements, building's warm hued exterior, and plethora of natural light. Supermodel Gigi Hadid purchased the last available unit in the building (a two-bedroom, two-and-a-half-bathroom apartment) for $3.971 million in 2016.

==== 347 Bowery ====
Located on the Bowery between East 3rd and 4th Streets (adjacent to the NoHo Historic District), 347 Bowery makes a large impact on its small lot. At a glance, the thirteen-story structure comprises two lower-level commercial floors with living units sitting above. The zinc tower takes full advantage of its corner lot and southwestern light by placing balconies wrapping the corner of the building on each floor. The first four living units are duplexes in which the balconies are placed in the master bedroom and living room. The triplex penthouse includes a significantly larger outdoor living space. Selldorf, who typically designs structures which fall in line with the rest of the neighborhood they are placed within, explains she went with the tower structure to maximize the small Bowery lot while still making each living unit a functional size.

==== Steinway Hall ====
For its relocation, Steinway & Sons signed a fifteen-year lease of the first two stories of 1133 Avenue of the Americas in 2014, after leaving its historic location on West 57th St. Selldorf designed the new space to be multifunctional, including an expansive showroom, recital hall, recording studio, and a rehearsal space.

Seldorf took heavy inspiration from the craftsmanship of Steinway pianos, as “end-grain oak flooring mimics that of Steinway’s factory in Queens; the patter of the lattice ceiling panels incorporates the shape of a grand piano; and imperial-yellow upholstery on the recital hall’s 74 seats echoes the hue of the felt found inside the instruments.” The main focal point of the showroom, however, is the main staircase which houses an installation by artist Spencer Finch titled Newton's Theory of Color and Music. The installation is a collection of multi-colored rods and is Finch's interpretation of a composition by Bach.

==== Neue Galerie ====
The Neue Galerie is an art museum dedicated to late nineteenth and early twentieth century Austrian and German art (furniture, paintings, sculpture, etc.) located within a historic Beaux-Arts mansion completed in 1914 on Manhattan's Upper East Side. Selldorf Architects were brought in to restore and renovate the small space after years of wear and tear had led to disrepair. While many of Annabelle Seldorf's gallery and museum designs take after the modernist tradition, the Neau Galerie's historic charm was highlighted.

Sellfdorf infused the comforts of modernity into the space while at the same time revitalizing much of the museum's Beaux-Arts details. For example, ramps were added to the exterior of the building, and the interior received an elevator in order to make the museum accessible to a greater number of visitors. The second floor required a number of renovations to the plaster walls, but the museum was also revamped through the inclusion of a coat rack, cafe, and bookstore, and more.

==== David Zwirner 20th Street ====
The design of the 2013 David Zwirner Gallery in Chelsea derives not only from the understated architectural novelty of the structure, but also from the connection the world class art dealer, Zwirner, and Selldorf have with one another. The pair formed a relationship, bonding over their shared hometown of Cologne, which has blossomed into a fruitful working relationship. In addition to designing the David Zwirner Gallery on 20th St, Selldorf has either conceived of or renovated all of Zwirner's other showrooms and also designed MZ Wallace's boutiques, a brand founded by Zwirner's wife.

For the David Zwirner Gallery in Chelsea, Selldorf leaned created a seven-story, 30,000 square foot gallery space cladded in textured concrete and warm-toned teak, and filled with natural light. The building represented industrial history of the neighborhood. The Gallery is the first LEED-certified commercial gallery in the United States.

==== Hauser & Wirth 18th Street ====
In 2013 Selldorf Architects renovated the Roxy roller rink and nightclub into Hauser & Wirth's (a global gallery) second gallery in New York City. The expansive space encompasses 24,700 and is free of columns because of its former life as a garage and roller skating rink. When visitors arrive they are drawn up a concrete staircase to the gallery's main 10,000 square foot exhibition space. While the space could have easily been renovated into a blank canvas, Selldorf decided to restore the original wood ceilings and steel trusses. Furthermore, Selldorf maximized the spaces natural light by expanding pre existing skylights.

=== National Gallery, London ===
In 2021, Selldorf emerged as the winner from an international shortlist of six firms to lead a design team for a major building project of London's National Gallery, including an upgraded foyer in the 1991 Sainsbury Wing, a new research centre in the lower level of the main 1838 Wilkins building and improvements to the outdoor space on the edge of Trafalgar Square. In 2026, Selldorf was among six shortlisted for yet another extension just to the north of the 1991 Sainsbury Wing; however, Kengo Kuma was eventually chosen instead.

== Selected awards ==
- American Institute of Architects (AIA) New York State Chapter: Merit Award, Luma Arles, 2019
- American Institute of Architects (AIA) New York State Chapter: Citation Award, 10 Bond Street, 2019
- American Institute of Architects (AIA) New York Chapter: Honor Award, David Zwirner Gallery, 2016;
- American Institute of Architects (AIA) New England Chapter: Merit Award, The Clark Art Institute Museum Building, 2016
- American Institute of Architects (AIA) New York Chapter: Medal of Honor, Annabelle Selldorf, 2016
- American Institute of Architects (AIA) New York State Chapter: Merit Award, David Zwirner Gallery, 2015
- American Institute of Architects (AIA) New York State Chapter: Merit Award, Sunset Park Material Recovery Facility, 2015
- American Institute of Architects (AIA) New York Chapter: Merit Award, Sunset Material Recovery Facility, 2014
- New York City Public Design Commission, Award for Excellence in Design, DEP Gowanus CSO Facility, 2019
- New York City Public Design Commission, Award for Excellence in Design, Sunset Park Material Recovery Facility, 2010
- Architectural Digest, AD100: 2020, 2019, 2018, 2017, 2013, 2011, 2010, 2007, 2004, 2002, 2000
- The Museum of Art and Design (MAD) Honoree, Annabelle Selldorf, 2018
- Lucy G. Moses Award: 1000 Dean Street and Berg'n, 2015
- The Waterfront Center's Excellence on the Waterfront: Sims Sunset Park Material Recovery Facility, 2016

== Publications ==
- Selldorf, Annabelle (2009). Selldorf Architects (1st ed.). New York: Monacelli Press. ISBN 978-1-58093-226-4.
- Selldorf, Annabelle (2016). Selldorf Architects: Portfolio and Projects. Phaidon Press. ISBN 978-0-7148-7117-2. with photographs by Todd Eberle

== See also ==
- Luis Laplace – a former Selldorf Architects employee
