= Zwirner =

Zwirner is a German surname. Notable people with the surname include:

- David Zwirner (born 1964), American art dealer, son of Rudolf
- Ernst Friedrich Zwirner (1802–1861), German architect
- Rudolf Zwirner (born 1933), German art dealer

== See also ==
- Zwiener
