= Illa del Rei =

Spanish island

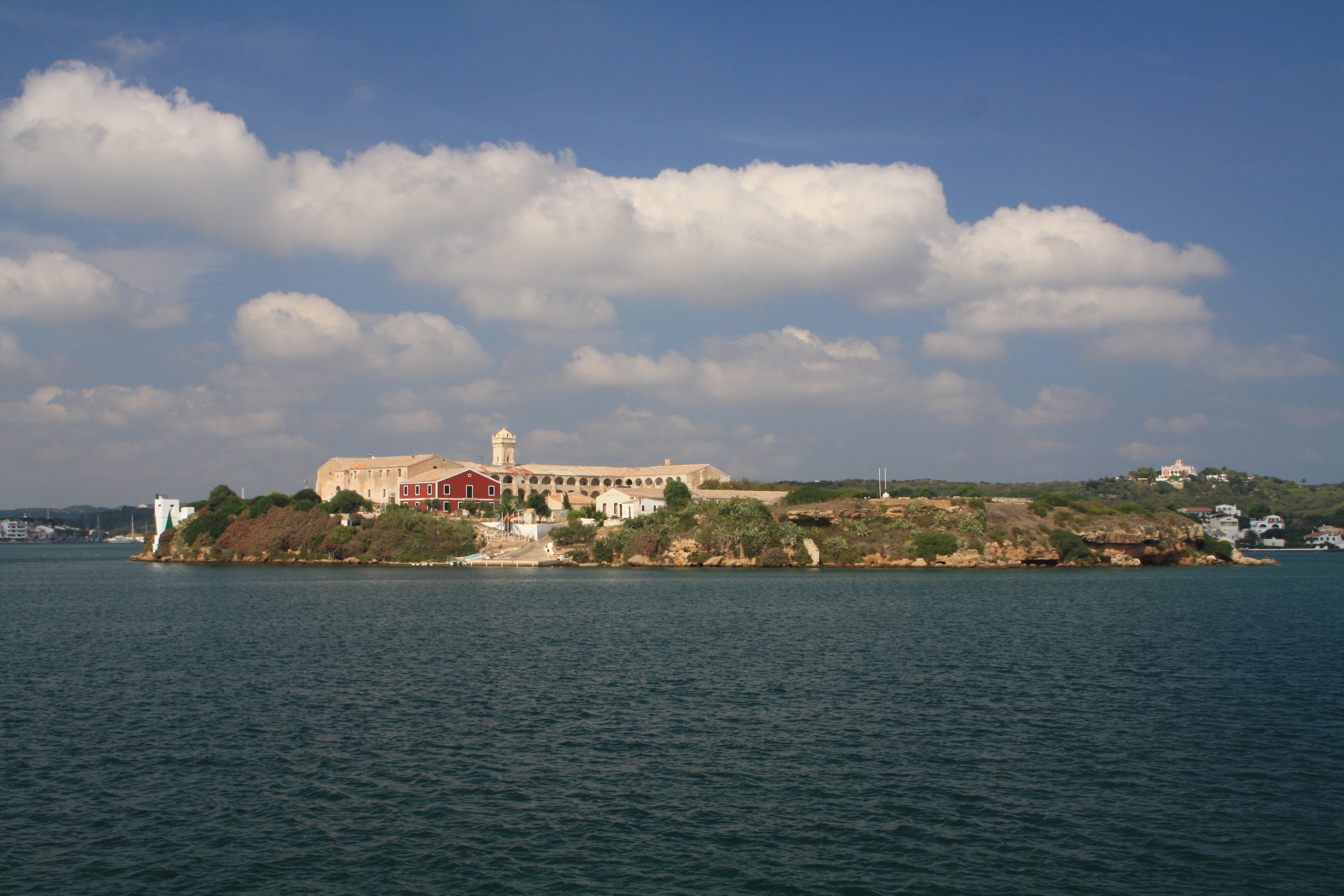

- Location in Spain

Geography
- Coordinates: 39°53′12″N 4°17′15″E
- Archipelago: Baleric Islands
- Area: 0.0424 km^{2} (0.0164 sq mi)
- Length: 0.289 km (0.1796 mi)
- Width: 0.283 km (0.1758 mi)

Administration
- Spain

L'Illa del Rei (Spanish: Isla del Rey; lit. 'King's Island'), also called Hospital Island in English, is a small island in the middle of the main navigable entry channel to Mahón on the northeastern side of Menorca in the Mediterranean Sea.

== Description ==
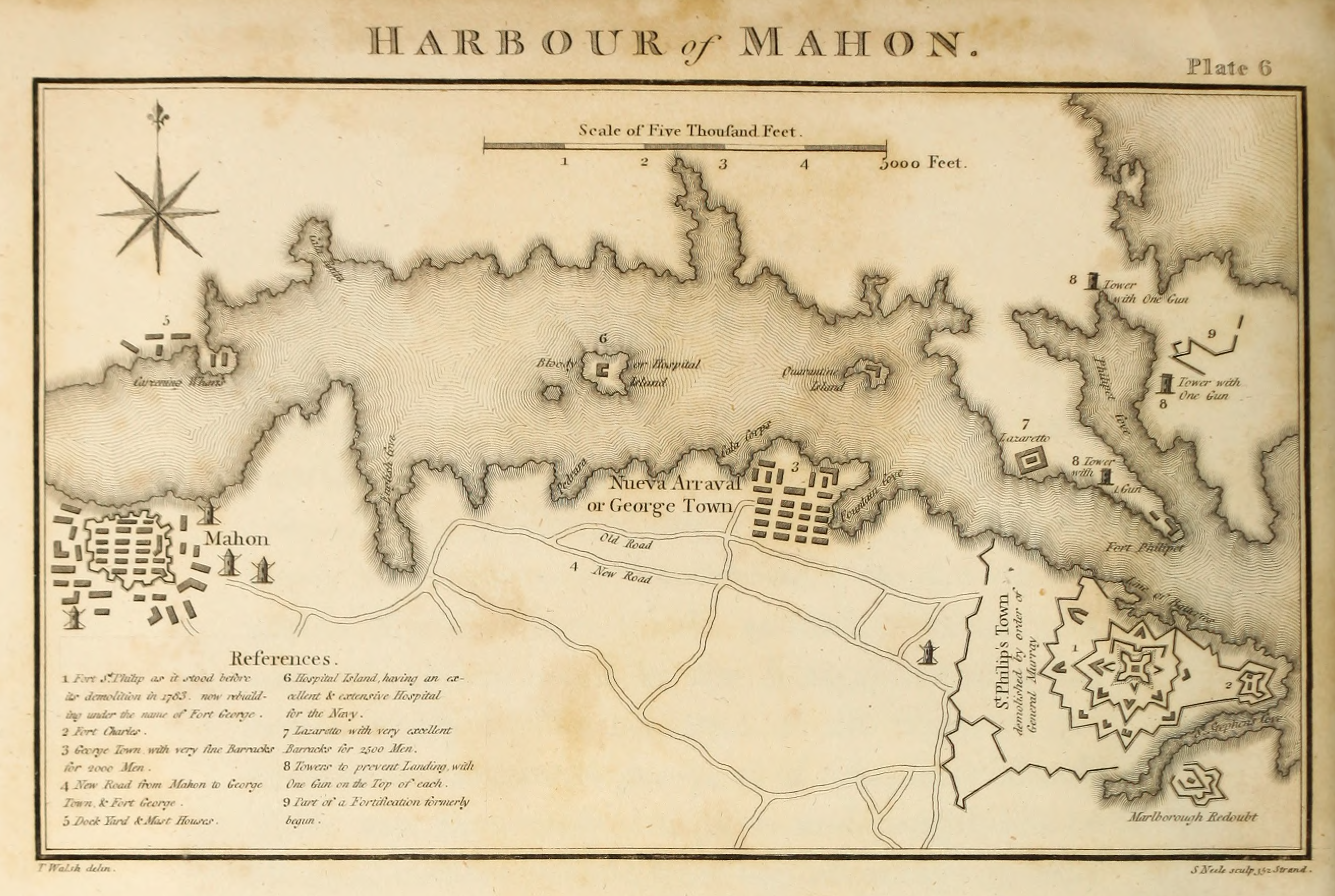
Illa del Rei in the center, labeled "Bloody or Hospital Island"

The island is roughly pear-shaped, 289 metres (948 ft) long and 283 metres (928 ft) wide with a total area of 4.24 hectares (10.5 acres). It is rocky with fairly steep sides around much of the perimeter and 14.5 metres (48 ft) above sea level at its highest point. Today the island is uninhabited and primarily a tourist attraction. It is dominated by the former hospital lying on the southwestern side and clearly visible from the shore on either side of the harbor.

== History ==
The island's name comes from the legend that King Alfonso III of Aragon first came ashore on the island during the Christian reconquest of Menorca in 1287. The island's earlier name, Illa dels Conills (Rabbit Island), was changed to Illa del Rei in honor of the conqueror.

The island also contains the remains of an early Christian basilica from the 6th century. The remains were first discovered in 1888, when a mosaic was found which bore similarities to those of the synagogue at Hammam-Lif in North Africa, which had been discovered a few years before. Systematic excavations did not begin until 1964, when they uncovered the full footprint of the basilica and additional buildings, perhaps monastic, as well as additional mosaics. The mosaics were moved to the Museum of Menorca for preservation and display.

A hospital was first constructed on the island by the British in 1711 who controlled Menorca for most of the 18th Century. Pierce Griffyth, Agent of the Sick and Wounded Board, oversaw construction of the hospital under the orders of Admiral Sir John Jennings. The island was called by the British Bloody Island or Hospital Island after the hospital. The island continued to be used as a hospital, as well as occasionally as a warehouse for coal and naval stores by the Spanish, French, British, Italian, and American navies through the 19th and 20th centuries. In 1964, a new hospital was built in Mahón and the island hospital was abandoned due to the difficulty of transporting patients.

In 1979 the hospital and adjoining buildings as well as the basilica were placed under monument protection (Declaración de Monumento Histórico-Artístico y Arqueológico de carácter Nacional).

In 1993 the Illa del Rei was declared a biosphere reserve because, among other things, the island is the only habitat of Podarcis lilfordi balearica, an endemic subspecies of the Lilford's wall lizard (Podarcis lilfordi) from the family of the real lizards (Lacertidae).

In 2004, the Fundación Hospital de la Isla del Rey was established with the aim of restoring and maintaining the facilities. The foundation succeeded in restoring the exterior of the main building in 2011, the 300th anniversary of the hospital, and continues to the improve facilities and provide access to the island to tourism. Hauser & Wirth leased part of the islet from the foundation to create a 16,000 square foot art center, following a conservation project overseen by Luis Laplace, repurposing existing historic buildings, and with gardens designed by Piet Oudolf. The gallery was awarded the Best Social Responsibility Initiative by the Government of the Balearic Islands in September 2021, listed as one of the '2022 Works of Wonder' by the international editors of Architectural Digest and named 'Best Art Destination' in the 2022 Wallpaper* Design Awards. Laplace and his partner Christophe Comoy also had a home, Santa Magdalena, on the island.

== Gallery ==
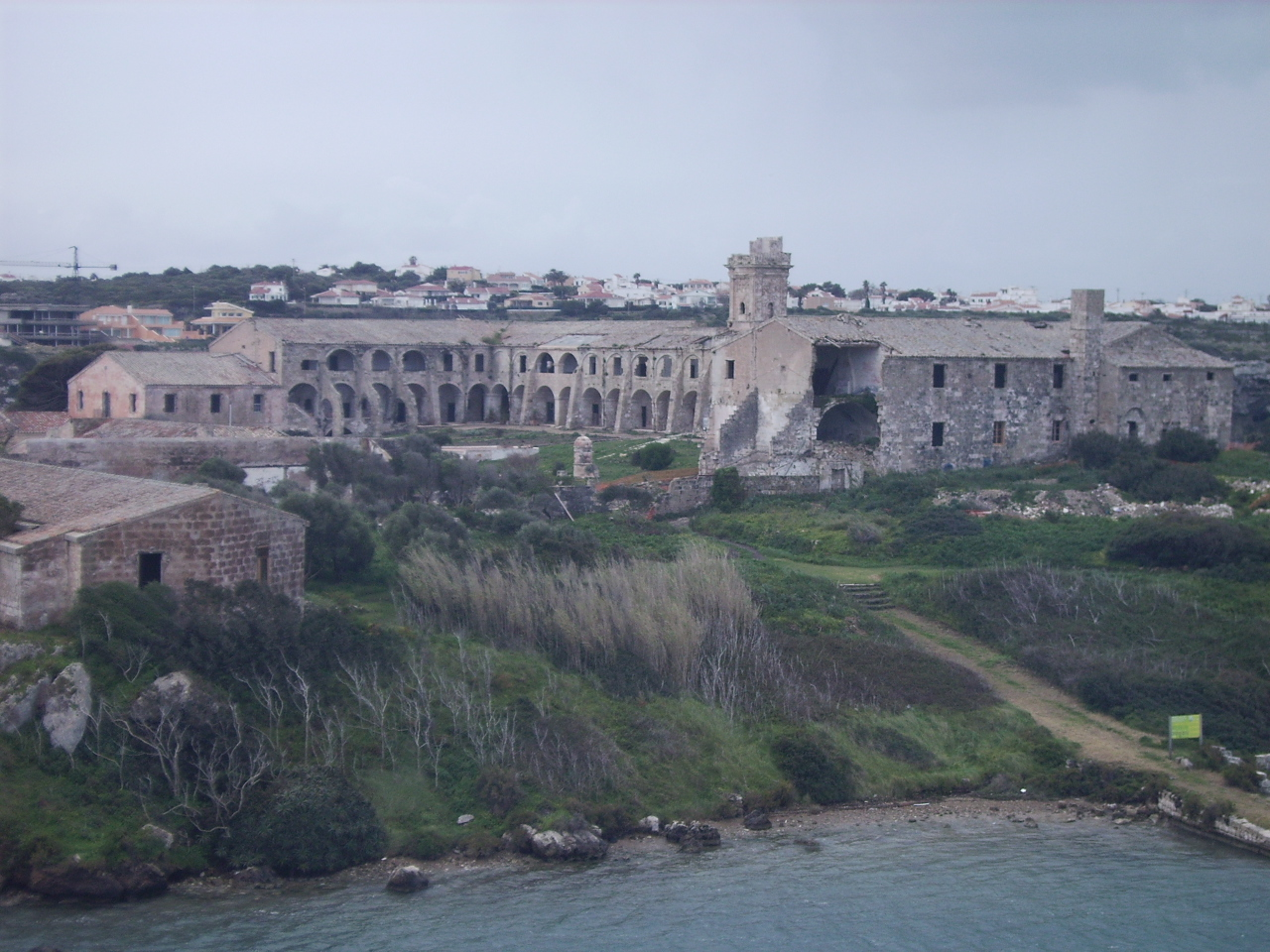
Hospital in 2008, in ruins

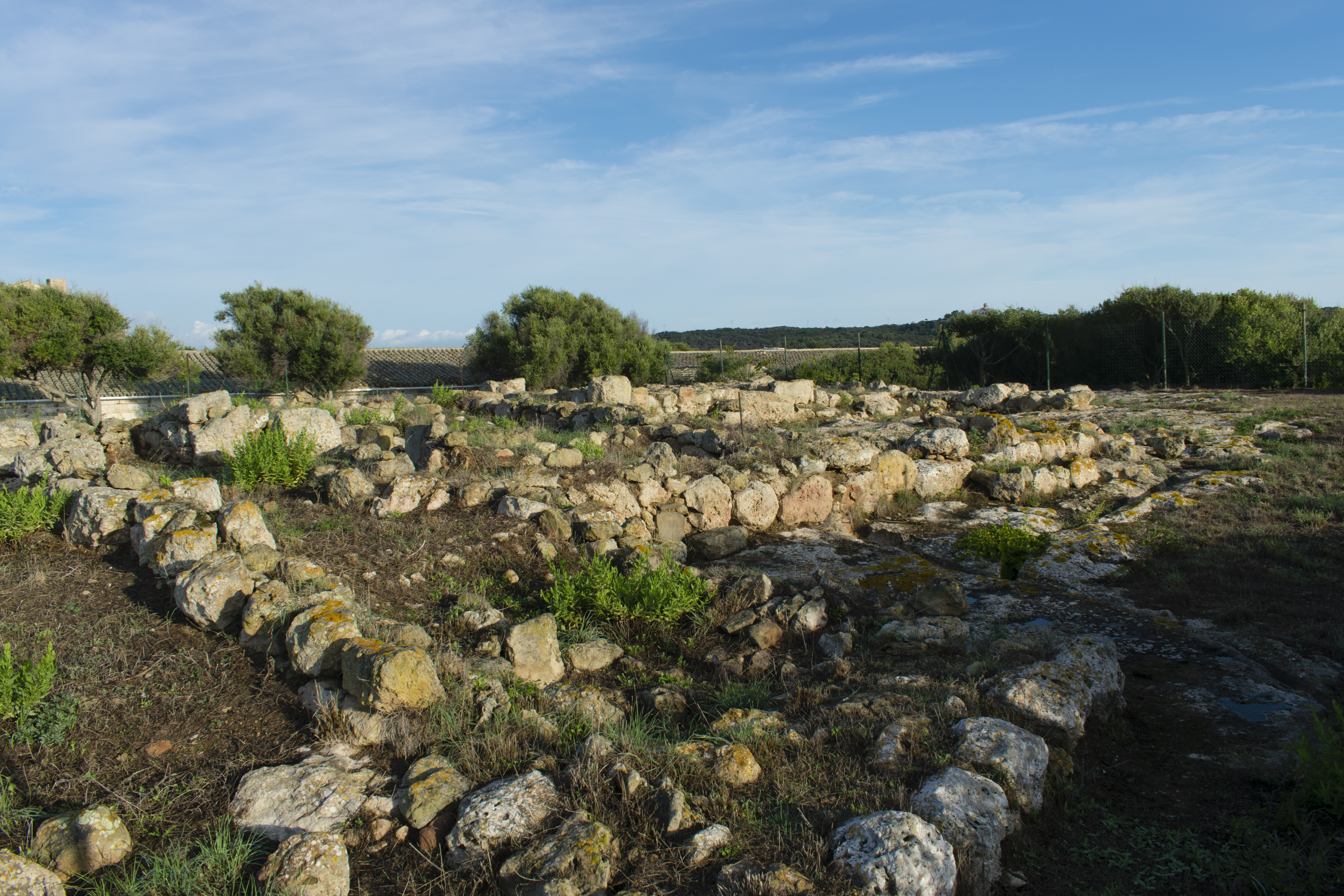
Ruins of the early Christian basilica

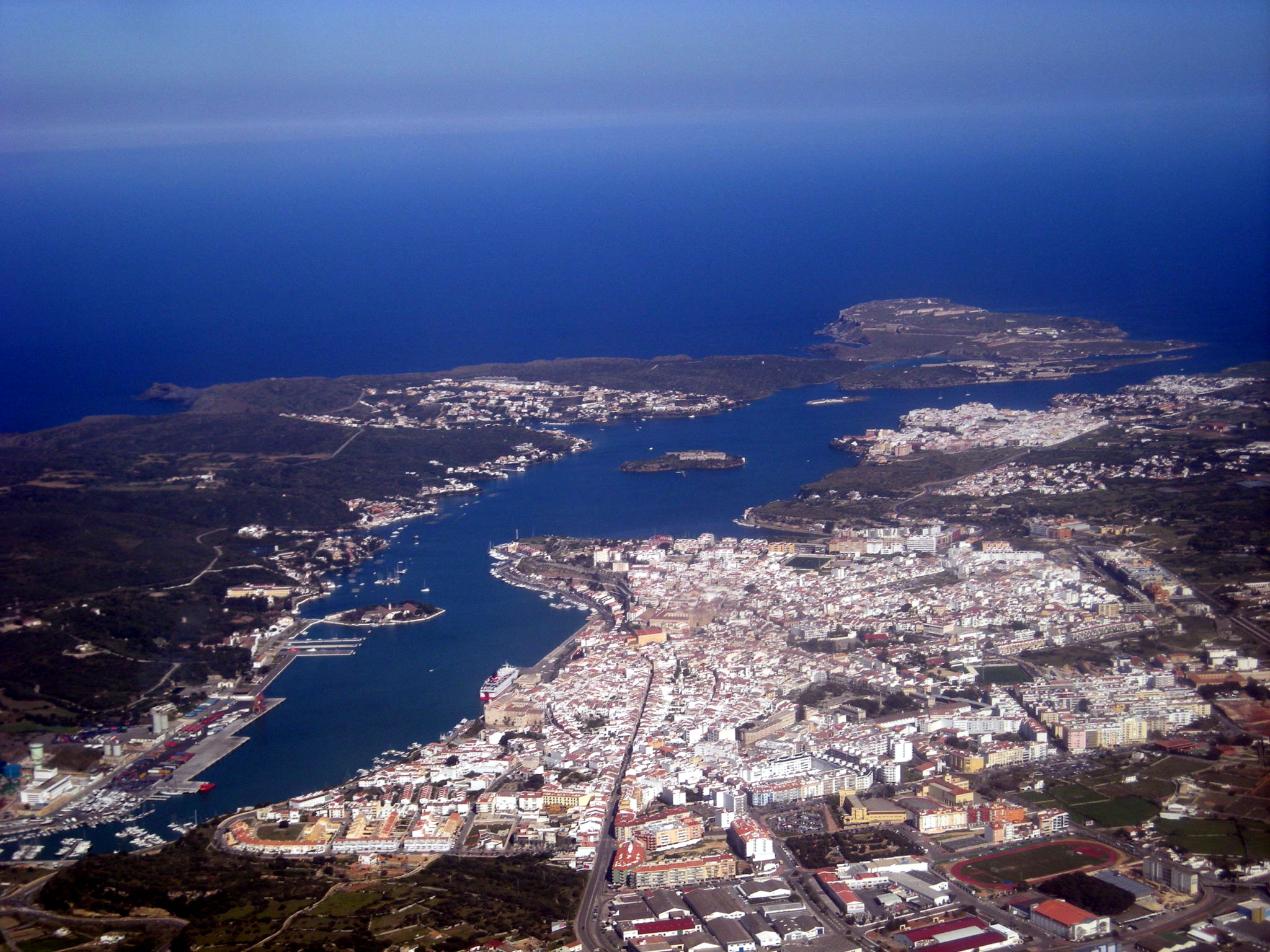
Mahón from the air with the Illa del Rei in the middle, above the city center.

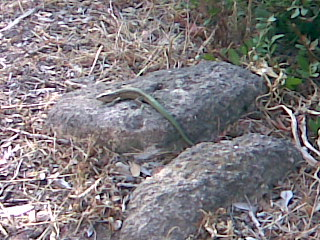
The endemic subspecies of Liford's wall lizard on the island.
