= Iwan Wirth =

Swiss art dealer

- Born: 1970 (age 55–56); Zurich, Switzerland
- Occupations: Art dealer, gallery owner
- Years active: 1990–present
- Known for: Co-founder, Hauser & Wirth
- Spouse: Manuela Hauser (m. 1996)

Iwan Wirth (born 1970) is a Swiss art dealer, gallery owner, and the president and co-founder of Hauser & Wirth, a contemporary art gallery.

== Life and career ==
Iwan Wirth was born in 1970 and spent his early life in St. Gallen, Switzerland, where his father was an architect and his mother was a schoolteacher. Wirth opened a commercial gallery in 1986 at the age of sixteen, and began working as a private dealer in Zurich in 1990.

=== Hauser & Wirth ===
In 1992, Wirth opened the Hauser & Wirth gallery together with his wife Manuela and her mother Ursula, heirs to the Fust retail fortune.

=== Other activities ===
In addition to his commercial activities, Wirth holds a variety of advisory positions, including:

- California Institute of the Arts (CalArts), member of the board of trustees (since 2016)
- Swiss Institute Contemporary Art New York, member of the board of trustees (since 2016)
- Maria Lassnig Foundation, member of the board of trustees (since 2015)
- Royal Academy of Arts, member of the board of trustees (since 2014)
- Serpentine Gallery, member of the council
- Tate, member of the South Asian Acquisitions Committee

From 1998 until 2009, Wirth and David Zwirner operated Zwirner & Wirth, which focused on private sales, in New York.

In 2014, Wirth opened an arts complex in Bruton, Somerset, which includes the Roth Bar & Grill restaurant and a guesthouse hotel in the Durslade Farmhouse. The public garden is designed by Piet Oudolf. He later purchased a hotel in Braemar, in Aberdeenshire in Scotland. He is also part-owner of 'Manuela', a restaurant at the Hauser Wirth & Schimmel arts complex in Los Angeles.

== Recognition ==
In 2015, Iwan Wirth and Manuela Hauser were ranked number one on ArtReview's list of 'most powerful and influential figures in the art world'. In 2012, Wirth and his wife endowed a senior lecturer position in modern and contemporary Asian art for the Courtauld Institute of Art in London. In 2015, both were awarded honorary doctorates by Bath Spa University.

Iwan and Manuela Wirth were named one of the 'Top 50 Philanthropists of 2019' by Town & Country, after founding Hauser & Wirth Institute and donating $1 million to Cal State LA through a partnership with Hauser & Wirth.

== Personal life ==
Iwan Wirth married Manuela Hauser, a former teacher, in 1996. They have four children.

They lived in Zurich until 2005, when the family moved to London's Holland Park. In 2007, the family made Somerset their primary residence. They maintain apartments in London and New York and a holiday home on Menorca's Isla del Rey, designed by Luis Laplace.
