= Cova des Coloms =

Cave in Menorca, Spain

Coordinates: 39°55′58.49″N 4°2′20.21″E

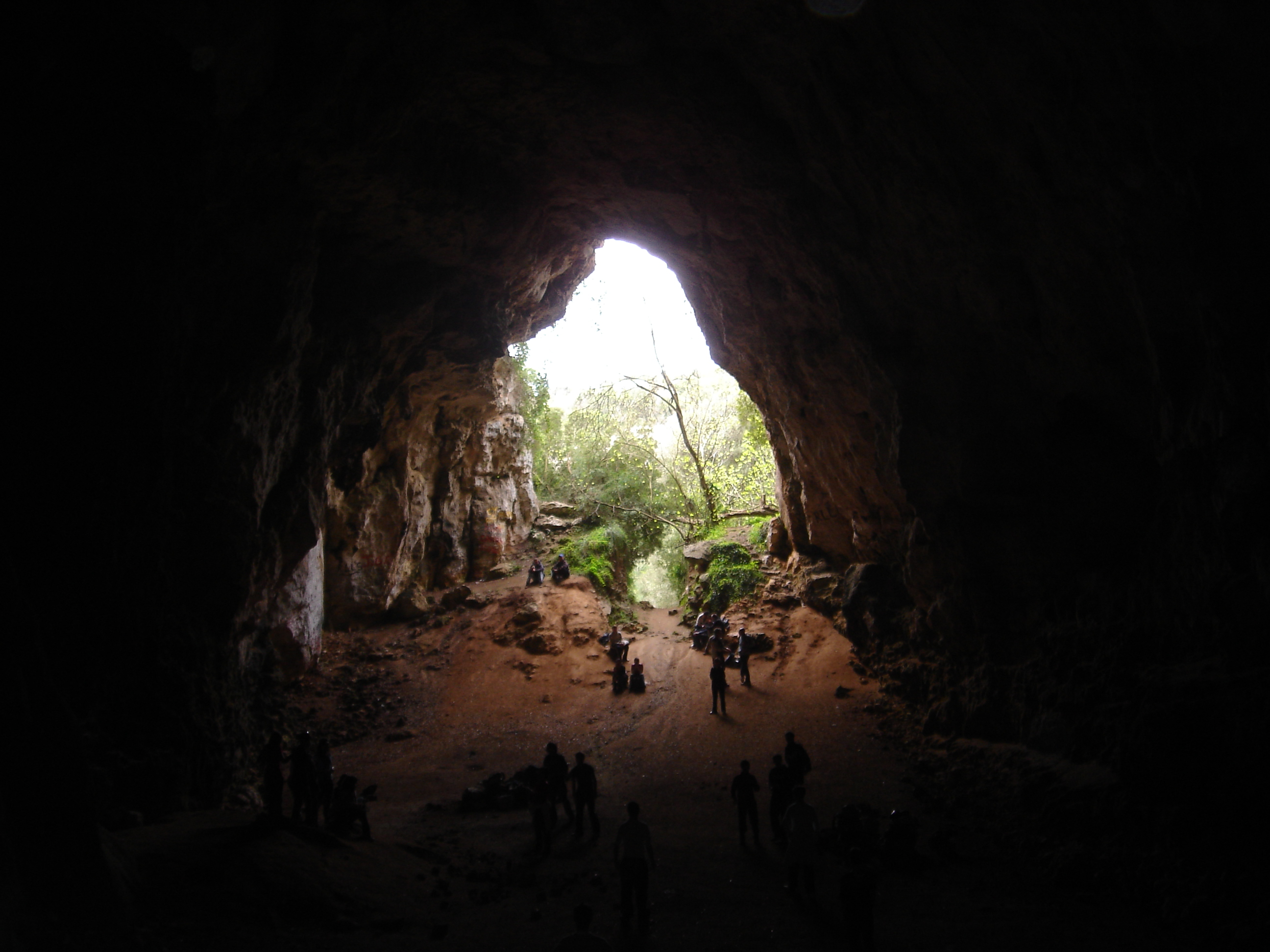
Cova des Coloms

Cova des Coloms (Cave of the pigeons in Catalan) is a natural cave located in the Spanish island Menorca, in the gully of Binigaus, that has been declared Bien de Interés Cultural. Its ceiling stands about 24 m (79 ft) above the floor, it is 100 m (330 ft) deep and its entrance has a width of 15 m (49 ft). It can be reached by walk from the village of Es Migjorn Gran following the path that goes to the beach of Binigaus.

== Location ==
The cave is located in the gully of Binigaus, approximately 1 mile southeast from Es Migjorn Gran and access is free. The closest car park is by the local graveyard. The path is signposted in a private gravel road. In the crossing of the path that leads to the cave's entrance, the town hall has placed an information sign in Catalan, Spanish and English.

== Description ==
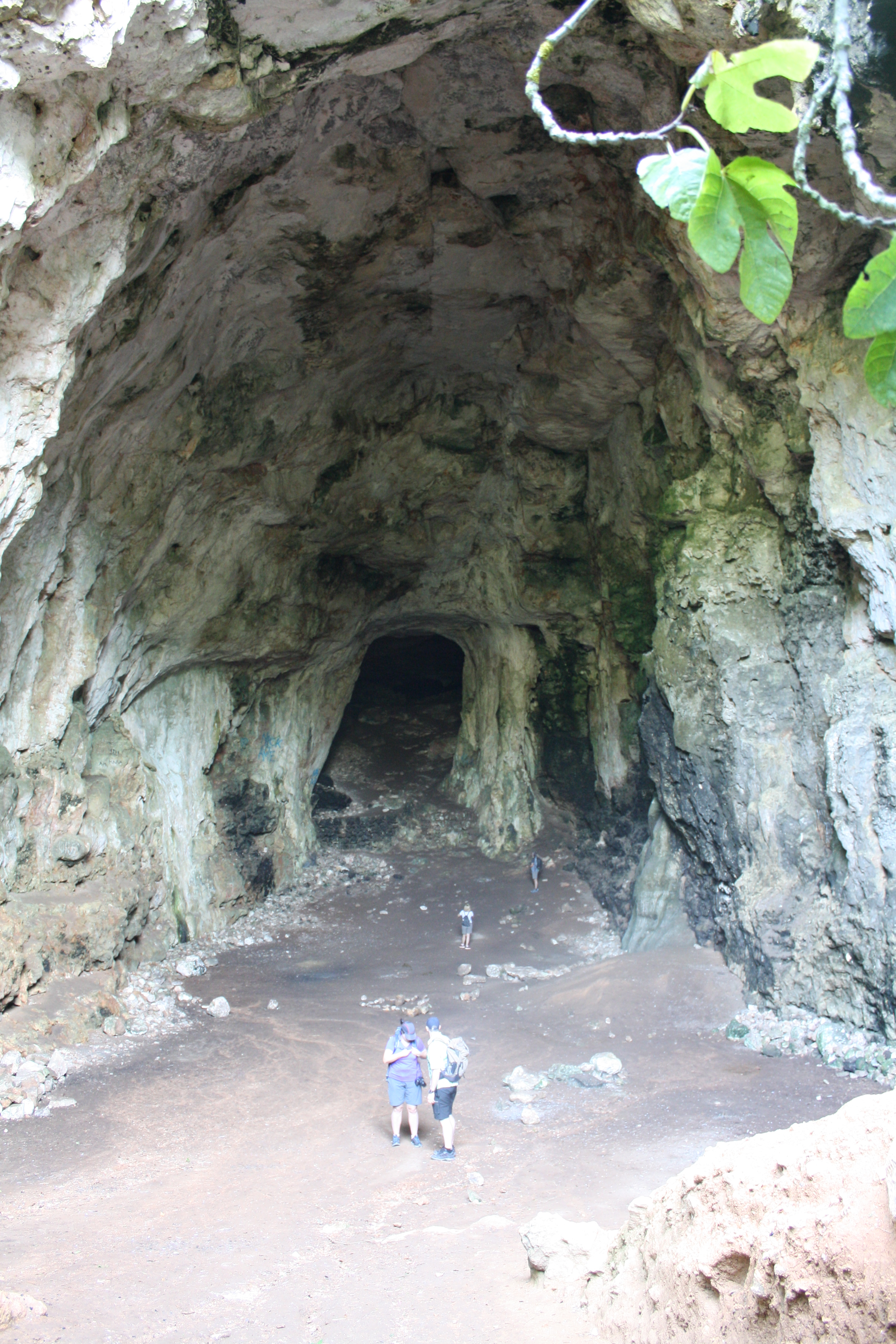
Cova des Coloms, seen from the outside.

The cave is 110-metre-deep, 15-metre-wide and 24-metre-high. For its sizes, it is also known as "the Cathedral". It is divided into two zones: the central room (about 50m deep) followed by a long and narrow corridor.

The cave was a burial site in the Talaiotic Period (550-123 ACN). The French prehistorian Émile Cartailhac found in the 1890s ceramic and human bones. The excavation by Antonio Vives Escudero (1859-1925) in 1914-1915 found ceramic vessels and two bronze objects.

The cave has been protected since 1966 as a Bien de Interés Cultural, with register number by the Spanish Ministry of Culture RI-51-0003660.

== Archaeological Site ==
The Cova des Coloms was a burial site from the Post-Talayotic period (550–123 BC), and it may also have had some kind of religious or ritual significance. Archaeological sediments are mainly found in the main chamber of the cave, which is where small-scale investigations have been carried out, and also the area most affected by illegal excavations and looting. Unfortunately, very little data exists about this archaeological site, as no intensive archaeological excavations have been conducted, nor any comprehensive research that might provide new insights.

Still, on both the right and left sides of the entrance, there are large mounds of soil that are likely the remains of these clandestine "excavations." This sediment could be the result of the cave’s interior being emptied out, a clue that suggests all burial remains may have been destroyed. We cannot rule out that the sediment seen outside the cave entrance and on the cliffside also results from this emptying process. On either side of the entrance, remnants of what may be prehistoric walls can be discerned, which might have served to enclose the cave from the outside.

Despite the damage, Cova des Coloms has attracted interest not only from the people of Menorca but also from expert historians and archaeologists for several decades. In fact, Archduke Ludwig Salvator of Austria already mentioned the Cova des Coloms and suggested its use during Menorca’s prehistory. Similarly, the French prehistorian Émile Cartailhac published in 1892 that he found ceramics and human bones after conducting small surveys.

One of the only excavations ever conducted was carried out by Antoni Vives i Escudero and the landowner Bartomeu Sturla between 1914 and 1915. At that time, they found prehistoric ceramic vessels and two bronze horns, one of which is part of the Vives Escudero collection and the other in the Cardona Mercadal collection, both housed at the Museum of Menorca. From the first horn, samples of charred wood were taken and analyzed using the radiocarbon dating method, producing a date of 406 BC.

== Talayotic Menorca: UNESCO World Heritage ==
[editar] Talayotic Menorca is a site inscribed on the UNESCO World Heritage List in 2023. It consists of a series of archaeological sites that testify to an exceptional prehistoric island culture, characterized by unique cyclopean architecture. The island preserves exclusive monuments such as funerary navetas, circular houses, taula sanctuaries, and talayots, all of which remain in full harmony with the Menorcan landscape and its connection to the sky.

Menorca has one of the richest archaeological landscapes in the world, shaped by generations that have preserved the Talayotic legacy. It has the highest density of prehistoric sites per square meter on any island and serves as a symbol of its insular identity.

This area is divided into nine zones covering archaeological sites and associated landscapes, with a chronology ranging from the emergence of cyclopean construction around 1600 BCE to the Romanization in 123 BCE. The exceptional value of its monuments and landscapes led to its inscription on the UNESCO World Heritage List in 2023.

== See also ==
- Caving in the Balearic Islands
