= Balearic slinger =

Ancient warrior

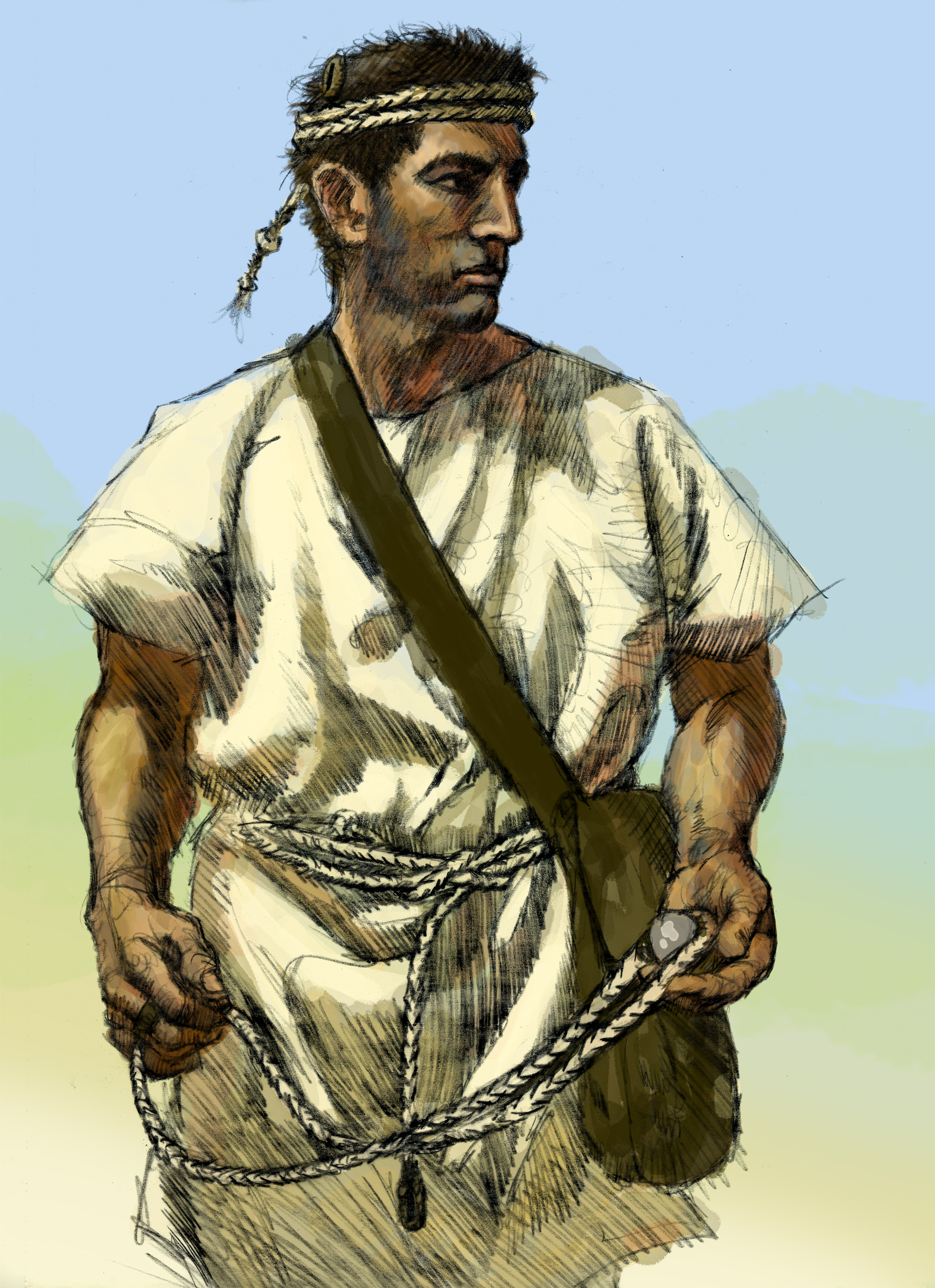
Balearic slinger.

The Balearic slingers, indigenous to the Balearic Islands, were warriors from ancient times famed for their mastery in the art of using the sling. They also served as mercenaries for both Carthaginian and Roman forces, particularly during the post-Talayotic era.

They played a role in the wars against the Greeks in Sicily and the Second Punic War, including the Battle of Baecula. Later, they served as light infantry auxiliaries in various battles, including Julius Caesar's legions in the Gallic Wars. Initially recruited voluntarily, conflicts with the Balearic populations arose during the final phase of the Punic Wars, leading to forced conscriptions, especially in Menorca.

== History ==
=== Carthaginian army ===
They are first mentioned in the mid-4th century BCE in Sardinia and during the conquest of Selinunte (409 BCE) in the context of the Second Sicilian War. Diodorus Siculus places them among Carthaginian fighters during the capture of Agrigento and, already in the Third Sicilian War, in the Battle of Ecnomus (310 BCE), under the command of Hamilcar, son of Gisco.

"But when Hamilcar saw that his men were being overpowered and that the Greeks in constantly increasing number were making their way into the camp, he brought up his slingers, who came from the Balearic Islands and numbered at least a thousand. By hurling a shower of great stones, they wounded many and even killed not a few of those who were attacking, and they shattered the defensive armor of most of them. For these men, who are accustomed to sling stones weighing a mina [21 ounces], contribute a great deal toward victory in battle. In this way they drove the Greeks from the camp and defeated them".

— Diodorus Siculus, about the Battle of the Himera River

According to chroniclers, Hannibal had approximately 2000 Balearic slingers, positioned at the forefront of his army during the early stages of the Italian campaign, responsible for initiating the fight to harass the Romans. It is noteworthy that the Balearic slinger contingents were explicitly mentioned in Hannibal's troop distribution before leaving command of the Carthaginian territory in the Iberian Peninsula to his brother Hasdrubal, to whom he entrusted 500 Balearic slingers. Hannibal attached great importance to these troops and protected them throughout the campaign as irreplaceable soldiers. The reason for their military effectiveness lay in the greater range and precision of the sling compared to the bow.

=== Roman army ===
After the Roman conquest of the Balearic Islands, historical sources again mention the slingers, now integrated into the Roman army. Gaius Sallustius informs us of Balearic slingers among Roman troops fighting in Numidia against King Jugurtha (111–105 BCE). Caesar mentions Balearic slingers as fighters in the Gallic Wars around 56 BCE, fighting alongside other elite troops such as Numidian cavalry and Cretan archers.

== Military function ==
The Balearic slingers were positioned at the vanguard of armies and acted as shock troops. They were often associated with Cretan archers, and their mission was to harass the enemy before the direct clash between the two armies. Lightly armed, once their harassment mission was complete, they gave way to the heavy infantry. Although the Balearic slingers excelled at both defending and assaulting fortifications, the Carthaginians primarily used them on the battlefield. Typically, they were the first to engage in battle, breaking through the enemy's front lines, smashing shields, helmets, and any kind of defensive weapon. When they ran out of projectiles or the enemy drew too close, they would retreat alongside the archers to make way for the bulk of the light infantry.

== In classical sources ==
The Balearic slingers are documented in the works of Strabo, Diodorus Siculus, Florus, Livy, Polybius, Sallust and Zonaras. Virgil mentions them in The Georgics, and Ovid in Metamorphoses. In the modern era, Miquel Costa i Llobera mentioned them in several of his odes concerning the traditions and culture of Mallorca.

== Equipment and weapon ==
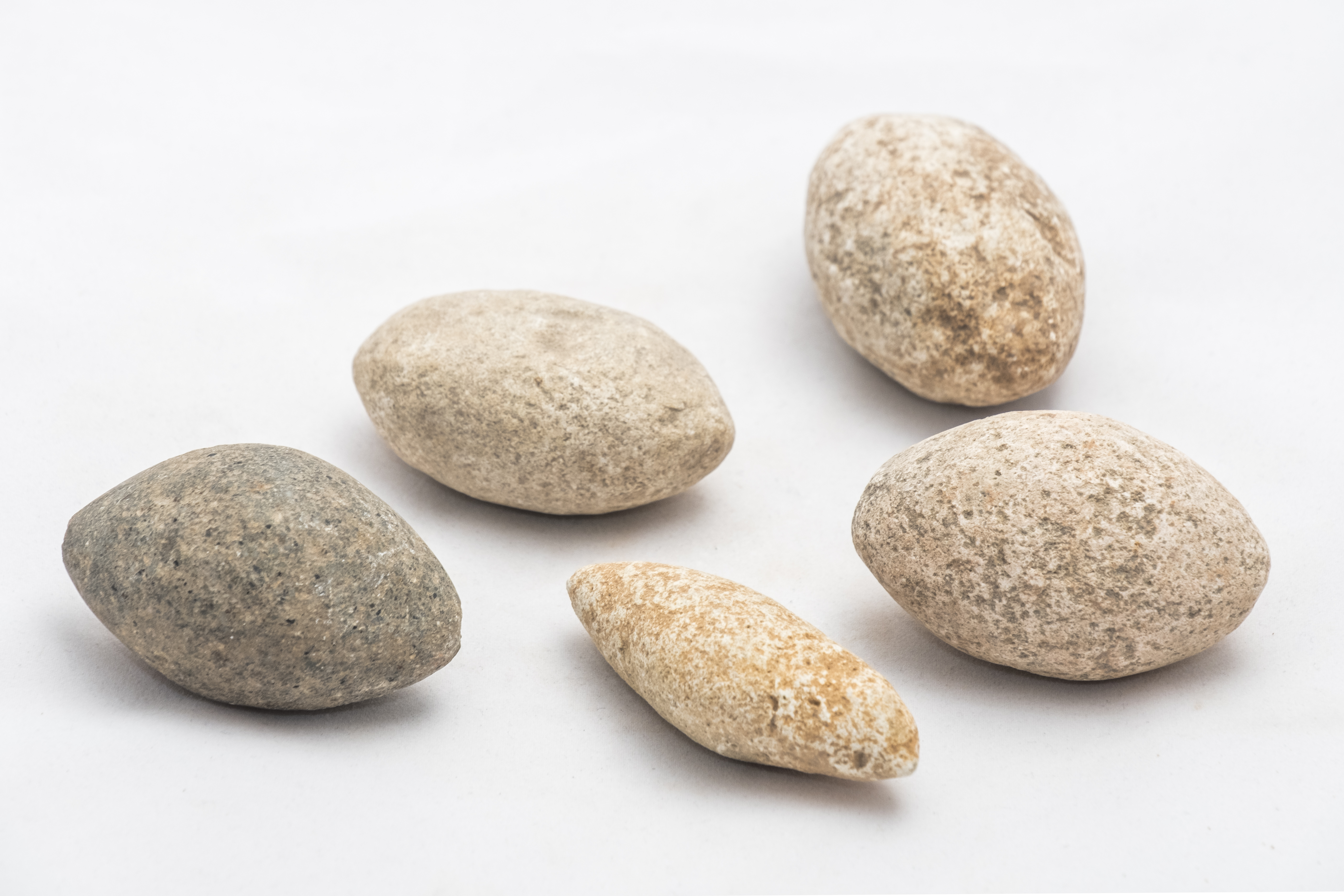
Projectiles used by slingers. Museo de Menorca.

They were equipped with a goat skin shield and an iron-tipped or fire-hardened javelin for close combat. In battle, they used three slings: one was larger for longer shots, worn around the waist; another of medium size was held in the hand; and a smaller one for close-range shots, worn on the head. The projectile could be launched in different ways, but they essentially had three types of shots (one for each sling). The slings were (and still are) made from fibres of perennial grasses, esparto, or other materials such as agave cactus, with an odd number of strands of fibre, commonly five, forming a braid. The projectiles, called glandes, were launched after three spins of their slings and could be made of stone, terracotta, or lead. They could weigh up to 500 g (1.1 lb), and their effects on enemy troops were powerful.

== Bibliography ==
- Conselleria de Cultura del Govern Balear (1992). La Prehistòria de les Illes de la Mediterrània Occidental (in Catalan). Palma de Mallorca.
- Rosselló Bordoy, Guillem (1979). La cultura talayótica en Mallorca (in Spanish). Palma de Mallorca: Cort. ISBN 9788485049295.
- Nadal Cañellas, Joan (2000). Els foners balears (in Catalan). Palma de Mallorca: Grup Serra. OCLC 777179224.
- Blázquez, José María; Alvar Ezquerra, Jaime; Wagner, Carlos González (1999). Fenicios y cartagineses en el Mediterráneo (in Spanish). Madrid: Cátedra. ISBN 9788437617312.
