= London Gallery Weekend =

Annual arts event in London, England

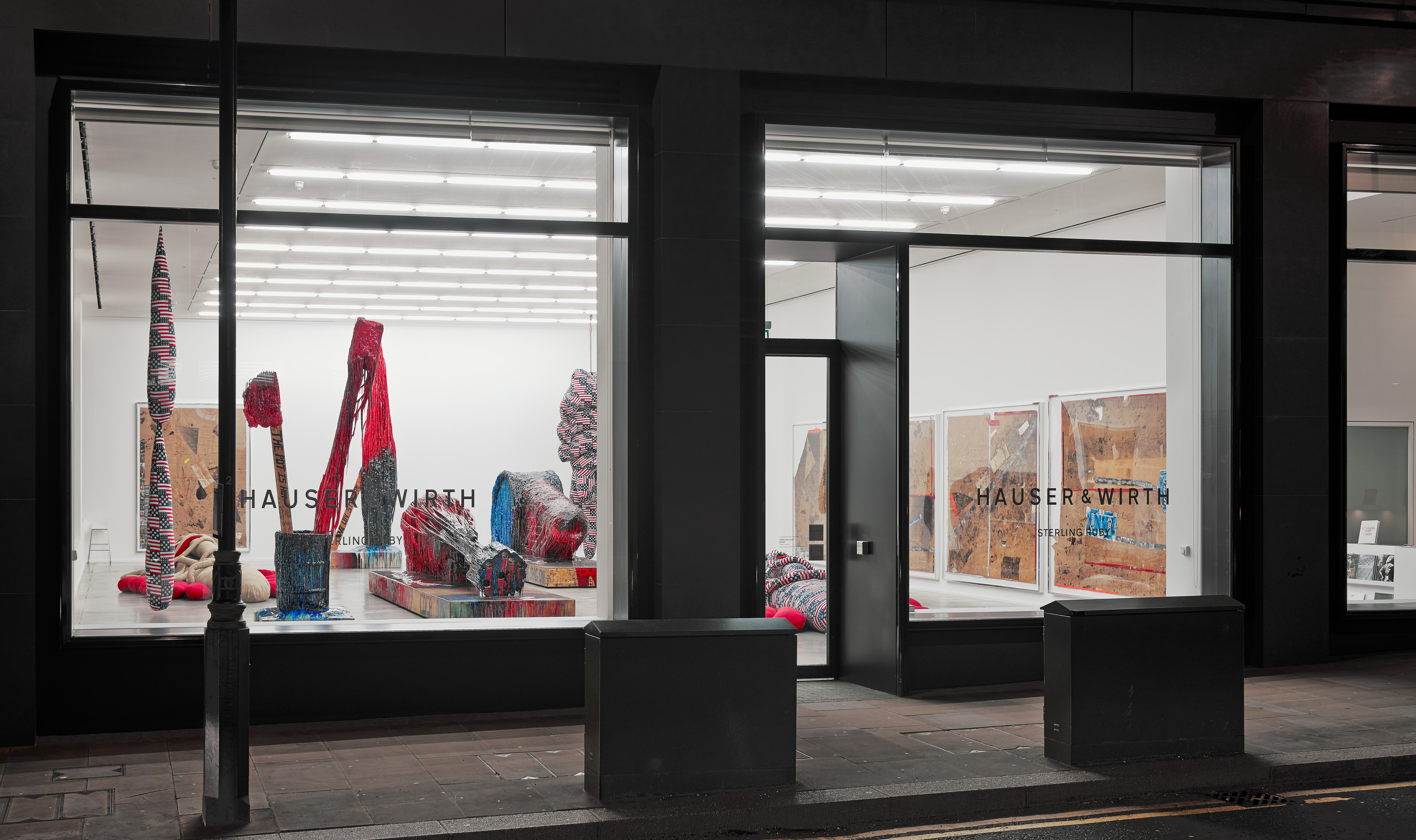
Exterior of the Hauser & Wirth gallery on Savile Row, one of the participating galleries in the London Gallery Weekend

London Gallery Weekend is an annual art event focusing on galleries around London. It involves a weekend where galleries host events and remain open for extended hours with free entry, similarly to gallery weekends held in other cities.

There are over 100 events scheduled across the participating contemporary art galleries. Its current format extends over three days with each day focusing on a different area, those being Bloomsbury the East End and South London. The event has been running annually since 2021.
