= Luis Laplace =

Argentine architect

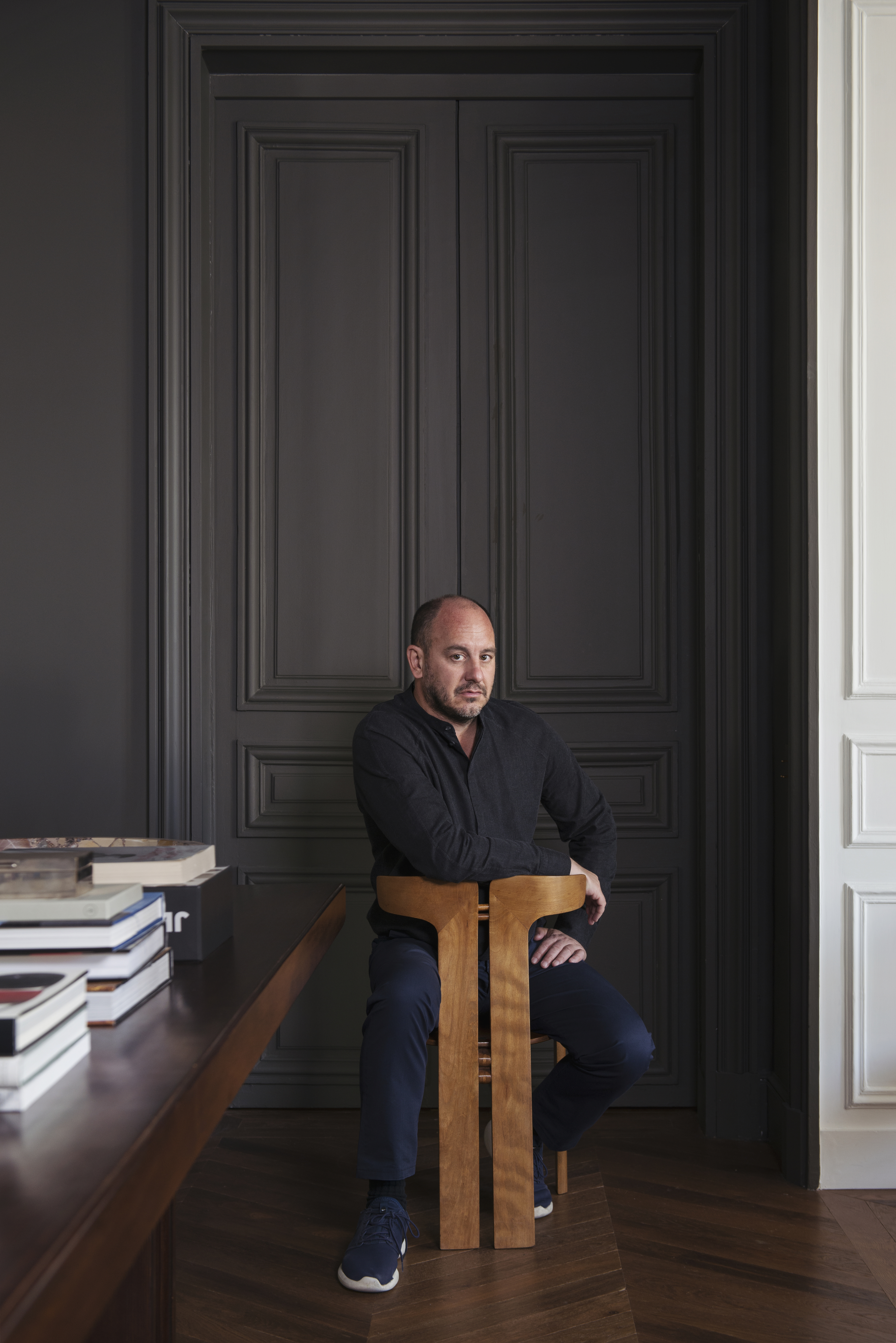
- Luis Laplace in 2019
- Born: 31 December 1969; Buenos Aires
- Alma mater: University of Belgrano
- Occupation: Architect
- Partner(s): Christophe Comoy
- Website: www.luislaplace.com

Luis Martorano Laplace (1969-) is an Argentine architect who, with his partner Christophe Comoy, founded and runs the Paris-based Laplace practice, where he is the head designer. He is known for his work for and in collaboration with the art gallery Hauser & Wirth, and has been included in several of Architectural Digest's annual AD100 lists.

== Early years ==
Laplace was born on 31 December 1969 in Buenos Aires, Argentina, and educated there. He is the son of a lawyer father and airport-manager mother, who divorced while he was still a child. He obtained bachelor and masters degrees in architecture and urbanism at the Universidad de Belgrano in 1995.

Following graduation he worked for Selldorf Architects in Argentina and Mallorca, before being employed at their in New York headquarters between 1999 and 2004.

== Career ==
Laplace founded his eponymous architectural practice in 2004, with his business- and life-partner Christophe Comoy, a former lawyer who serves as CEO. Laplace is the head designer. The practice is headquartered on the Place Saint-Georges, in the heart of Nouvelle Athènes district of the 9th arrondissement of Paris, France.

He has a longstanding relationship with the art gallery chain Hauser & Wirth. He has worked on their galleries in Somerset, Gstaad, St Moritz and Paris. Their art centre on Illa del Rei, Menorca, opened in July 2021 after a conservation project overseen by Luis Laplace, repurposing existing historic buildings. The gallery was awarded the Best Social Responsibility Initiative by the Government of the Balearic Islands in September 2021, listed as one of the '2022 Works of Wonder' by the international editors of Architectural Digest and named 'Best Art Destination' in the 2022 Wallpaper* Design Awards. His work on the Hauser & Wirth gallery in Paris, a 19th-century hôtel particulier, won the restoration category in the 2024 Wallpaper* Design Awards. He also designed the presentation of a 2024 exhibition of works by the Basque sculptor Eduardo Chillida at Hauser & Wirth's Minorca centre.

Laplace's other clients include Adriana Abascal, Nicolas Berggruen,Mick Flick, Emmanuel Perrotin and Cindy Sherman. He has worked on residential projects in France, Hong Kong, Mexico, Peru, South Korea, Spain, Switzerland, the UK and the United States. He has collaborated with artists and designers including Phyllida Barlow, who painted a ceiling mural for his refurbishment of The Audley, a pub in Mayfair, London; Martin Creed, who painted the staircase of the Hauser & Wirth gallery in Paris; Rashid Johnson, who designed a mosaic floor for Mount St. Restaurant at The Audley; Piet Oudolf, who landscaped the Hauser & Wirth gallery in Somerset and their centre in Menorca; and Anj Smith, who made a painting in a turret at The Audley building. Laplace collaborated with the Guston Foundation on the restoration of Philip Guston's 1934–1935 mural The Struggle Against Terrorism.

Laplace was included in Architectural Digest's annual AD100 list, which recognizes the most influential interior designers and architects around the world, in 2017, 2018, 2019, 2020, 2021, 2023, 2024, and 2025.

In 2024, Laplace took part in the "Tous Mécènes!" fundraising campaign launched by the Louvre to acquire the artwork Le Panier de fraises by Jean Siméon Chardin.

== Personal life ==
Laplace and Comoy live in an apartment in a Paris building neighbouring the one where their architectural practice has its office. They have another home in Midi-Pyrénées, France. They also had a home, Santa Magdalena, on Illa del Rei.
