= Manuela Wirth =

Swiss gallerist (born c. 1960s)

Manuela Hauser Wirth (née Manuela Hauser; born c. 1960s) is a Swiss art gallery owner. She is co-owner of Hauser & Wirth, with galleries in Europe, Asia, and North America.

== Life and career ==
Manuela Hauser was born in the mid 1960s to Ursula Hauser, co-owner of the Swiss retail chain Fust She grew up in the town of Uzwil in the canton of St. Gallen in eastern Switzerland.

Manuela, Iwan Wirth, and Ursula Hauser founded Hauser & Wirth in 1992. Hauser married Iwan Wirth in 1996.

Wirth has been called "the world's most powerful [art] dealer."
