= Zwiener =

Zwiener is a German surname. Notable people with the surname include:

- Erin Zwiener (born 1985), American author and politician
- Philip Zwiener (born 1985), German basketball player
- Sabine Zwiener (born 1967), German middle-distance runner

== See also ==
- Zwirner
