= Sophie Berrebi =

Dutch art historian

Sophie Berrebi is an art historian, author, and curator. Her research is based at the Amsterdam School for Memory, Heritage and Material Culture (AHM) and she is a board member of this institution. She has published widely and won the Richard Schlagman Art Book Award for history of art in 2019.

== Biography ==
Berrebi was born in Paris. She graduated from the Courtauld Institute of Art with a PhD in 2003. She teaches art history and theory at the University of Amsterdam and her research is based at the Amsterdam School for Cultural Analysis. She is particularly interested in photography and contemporary art.

== Awards ==
Richard Schlagman Art Book award for Dubuffet and the City: People, Place, and Urban Space published by Hauser & Wirth (won both the art history and best book design prizes).

== Curated exhibitions ==
- Jean Dubuffet. The Deep End. Stedelijk Museum Amsterdam, 2017-2018
- Seventy Years of The Second Sex, Hauser & Wirth Zürich, 2022.
- Dubuffet and the City, Hauser & Wirth Zürich, 2018
- Platform: Body/Space. Het Nieuwe Instituut, Rotterdam, 2016–2017
- Il faut que le masque ait dansé. Marres, Centre for Contemporary Culture, Maastricht, 2013
- Papier Photo, Galerie chez Valentin, Paris, 2010 (with F. Valentin)
- Sharing History / Decolonising The Image, W139, Amsterdam, 2006 (with D. Bedel).
- Social Sculpture, Ellen de Bruijne Projects, Amsterdam, 2005

== Books ==
- The Sharing Economy, 2023 - her first novel
- Jean Dubuffet, People, Place and Urban Space, Hauser & Wirth Publishers, 2018
- Hubert Damisch -Jean Dubuffet: Entrée en matière. Textes et Correspondances. Edited and Introduced by Sophie Berrebi, Paris- Zürich: éditions Jrp Ringier and La maison rouge - Fondation Antoine de Galbert, 2016
- The Shape of Evidence. Contemporary Art and the Document, 2015
