= Artists for Haiti (art auction) =

Artists for Haiti is an art auction dedicated to raising money for education and health programs for children in Haiti. The auction, organized by Ben Stiller and art dealer David Zwirner, took place at Christie's in New York on September 22, 2011.

The auction raised a total of $13,662,000, which was above the original estimate of $7.5 to $10.5 million. It included 27 works by 26 artists: Adel Abdessemed, Francis Alÿs, Mamma Andersson, Louise Bourgeois (Trust), Cecily Brown, Chuck Close, Marlene Dumas, Urs Fischer, Dan Flavin (Estate), Jasper Johns, Martin Kippenberger (Estate), Jeff Koons, Glenn Ligon, Nate Lowman, Paul McCarthy, Chris Ofili, Raymond Pettibon, Elizabeth Peyton, Neo Rauch, Cindy Sherman, James Rosenquist, Ed Ruscha, Rudolf Stingel, Luc Tuymans, Kelley Walker, and Zhang Huan. Four world auction records were obtained for Adel Abdessemed ($350,000), Glenn Ligon ($450,000), Nate Lowman ($140,000), and Raymond Pettibon ($820,000). Two works of art were sold for over one million dollars: Marlene Dumas at $2,000,000 and Luc Tuymans at $1,150,000.

One hundred percent of the sales will support non-profit organizations that work in Haiti, including Architecture for Humanity, J/P Haitian Relief Organization, Partners In Health, Grameen Creative Lab, Artists for Peace and Justice, Ciné Institute, The Stiller Foundation, among others.
