= Anj Smith =

British artist (born 1978)

Anj Smith (born 1978) is a British artist. She was born in Kent and studied at the Slade School of Fine Art and at Goldsmiths College in London. Her intricately rendered paintings explore issues surrounding gender, ecology, anxiety, and eroticism.

Smith has exhibited at institutions around the world, including Museo Stefano Bardini, Florence, Italy; The New Art Gallery Walsall, UK; Mostyn, Llandudno, UK; Sara Hildén Art Museum, Tampere, Finland; Bluecoat, Liverpool, UK; Knoxville Museum of Art, Knoxville TN, and La Maison Rouge, Paris.

In 2006, she was short-listed for the MaxMara Award for Women at the Whitechapel Art Gallery in London. Smith is represented by Hauser & Wirth gallery.

== Selected exhibitions ==
=== Solo ===
- (2025) Hauser & Wirth, 'Anj Smith: The Sequin-Strewn Night', West Hollywood, CA
- (2023) Hauser & Wirth, 'Anj Smith. Drifting Habitations', New York NY
- (2022) The Perimeter, 'Anj Smith. Where the Mountain Hare has Lain', London, UK
- (2021) Museo Stefano Bardini, 'Anj Smith. A Willow Grows Aslant the Brook', Florence, Italy (Travelling Exhibition)
- (2021)The New Art Gallery Walsall, 'Anj Smith. A Willow Grows Aslant the Brook', Walsall, UK (Travelling Exhibition)
- (2019) Mostyn, 'Anj Smith', Llandudno, UK
- (2019) Museo Poldi Pezzoli, 'The Contemporary at Poldi Pezzoli. Anj Smith The Mountain of the Muse', Milan, Italy
- (2018) Sara Hildén Art Museum, 'Sea Lilly, Feather Star', Tampere, Finland
- (2018) Hauser & Wirth, 'If Not, Winter', Zurich, Switzerland
- (2015) Hauser & Wirth, 'Phosphor on the Palms', London, UK
- (2013) Hauser & Wirth, 'The Flowering of Phantoms', New York NY
- (2012) Galerie Isa, 'Woods Without Pathways', Mumbai, India
- (2011) IBID PROJECTS, 'States of Fragility', London, UK
- (2010) Hauser & Wirth, 'Geometry of Bliss', New York NY

=== Group ===
- (2021) Fondazione Sandretto Re Rebaudengo, 'Stretching the Body', Turin, Italy
- (2021) Iwaki City Art Museum, 'New Word. The Power of Dreams', Fukushima, Japan
- (2021) Schinkel Pavillon, 'Sun Rise | Sun Set', Berlin, Germany
- (2019) Malborough Gallery, 'The Smiths', London, UK
- (2019) Hudson Valley MOCA, 'Where is the Madness You Promised Me. Dystopian Paintings from the Marc and Livia Straus Family Collection', Peekskill NY
- (2019) Zabludowicz Collection, 'World Receivers', London, UK
- (2018) Museum Morsbroich, 'The Pliable Plan. Rococo in Contemporary Art', Leverkusen, Germany
- (2017) Fondazione Stelline, 'The New Frontiers of Painting', Milan, Italy
- (2017) Wilkinson, 'A Landscape', London, UK
- (2016) The Nunnery Gallery, '2016 Bow Open Show', cur. by Anj Smith, London, UK
- (2016) Marc Straus, 'If only Bella Abzug were here', New York NY
- (2016) Museum Arnhem, 'Queensize. Female Artists from the Olbricht Collection', Arnhem, Netherlands (Travelling Exhibition)
- (2014) SHOWstudio, 'SHOWcabinet', cur. by Anj Smith, London, UK
- (2013) The Bluecoat, '3am. wonder, paranoia and the restless night', Liverpool, UK (Travelling Exhibition)
- (2012) Anthony Reynolds Gallery, 'The Curator's Egg Altera Pars', London, UK

== Selected publications ==
=== Monographs ===
- (2023) Bennet, Claire-Louise, Smith, Anj, Guralnik, Orna, 'Anj Smith: Drifting Habitations', Zurich: Hauser & Wirth Publishers, 2023, ill. (exh. cat.)
- (2022) Smith, Anj, Norton, Yates, 'Anj Smith. Where the Mountain Hare has Lain', London: The Perimeter, 2022, ill. (exh. cat.)
- (2021) Joustra, Joost, Whitley, Zoé, Robinson, Deborah, 'Anj Smith. A Willow Grows Aslant the Brook', Walsall: New Art Gallery, 2021, ill. (exh. cat.)
- (2018) Soikkonen, Sarianne (ed.), ‘Anj Smith. Sea Lily, Feather Star’, Tampere: Sara Hildén Art Museum, 2018, ill. (exh. cat.)
- (2013) Mac Giolla Léith, Caoimhín, Gingeras, Alison, 'Anj Smith. Paintings', London: MACK, 2013
- (2012) Adeli, Jamila, 'Anj Smith. Woods Without Pathways', Mumbai: Prodon, 2012, ill. (exh. cat.)
- (2007) Schwabsky, Barry, Schafhausen, Nicolaus, 'Anj Smith. Paintings', New York: Foundation 20 21; Nyehaus, 2007, ill.

=== Publications ===
- (2018) Kreuzer, Stefanie, ‘Der Flexible Plan: Das Rokoko In Der Gegenwartskunst’, Dortmund: Verlag Kettler, 2018
- (2018) Rideal, Liz, Soriano, Kathleen, 'Madam & Eve. Women Portraying Women', London: Laurence King Publishing Ltd, 2018
- (2017) Paparoni, Demetrio (ed.), 'Le nuove frontiere della pittura', Milan/IT: Skira, 2017 (exh. cat.)
- (2015) Graef, Nicola, Olbricht, Claudia (et at), 'Queensize – Female Artists from the Olbricht Collection', Berlin: argobooks, 2015 (exh. cat.)
- (2014) Beers, Kurt, '100 Painters of Tomorrow', London: Thames & Hudson, 2014
- (2013) The Bluecoat (ed), '3am: wonder, paranoia and the restless night', Liverpool: Liverpool University Press/The Bluecoat, 2013, unpaginated, ill.
- (2013) Léith, Caoimhín Mac Giolla, Gingeras, Alison, 'ANJ SMITH. Paintings', London: MACK, 2013
- (2013) Unterdörfer, Michaela (ed.), 'Hauser & Wirth.20 Years', Ostfildern: Hatje Cantz, 2013
- (2011) Price, Matt (ed.), 'Vitamin P2: New Perspectives in Painting', London: Phaidon, 2011
- (2005) Hauser & Wirth (ed.), 'London in Zurich', Dallenwil: Druckerei Odermatt, 2005
