= Rudolf Zwirner =

German art dealer and gallerist

- Born: 1933 (age 92–93)
- Occupations: Art dealer and gallerist
- Known for: Co-founded the world's first art fair, Art Cologne
- Spouse(s): Ursula Reppin (div. 1974/75); Ursula ? Dorothea
- Children: 3, including David Zwirner
- Parent: Eberhard Zwirner

Rudolf Zwirner (born 1933) is a German art dealer and gallerist. The Zwirner Gallery, which he directed, was one of the leading galleries for contemporary art in Europe from the 1970s to the 1990s.

== Early life ==
He was born in 1933, the son of the phonetician Eberhard Zwirner. His brother, Ruprecht Zwirner (1929–2010), was a doctor. After graduating high school in 1954, he began studying law and art history at the Albert Ludwig University of Freiburg. In 1956, he left the university to do an internship at Hein Stünke's gallery, Der Spiegel, in Cologne, after a visit to documenta 1, which had impressed him greatly and "converted" him to modern art. He had also known Stünke through his father from the time of National Socialism. He worked in the modern department of Gerd Rosen's auction house in Berlin from 1957. In 1958, he went to Paris and became an employee of Heinz Berggruen's gallery. Later, in 1959, he was appointed Secretary General of documenta 2 in Kassel by Arnold Bode, a position "...which opened up the international art world to him."

== Career ==
Together with his wife Ursula Reppin, a trained artist and graphic design expert, he opened his first gallery in Essen in 1959. They opened a second gallery in Cologne in 1963. He exhibited works by artists such as Karel Appel, Konrad Klapheck, Jesús Rafael Soto and Takis (1961) and Cy Twombly. After these first beginnings as a gallery owner in Essen, he left to go to Cologne in 1962 and opened new gallery spaces in the Kolumbakirchhof, where Joseph Beuys did his first exhibition using fat in 1963. In 1964, Zwirner moved the Gallery to Albertusstrasse 16 in Cologne. In 1965, he showed René Magritte's first solo exhibition in Germany.

In 1966, he founded the Association of Progressive German Art Dealers with Hein Stünke in order to be able to negotiate with the city of Cologne on an institutional level about a fair for modern art in Cologne. In the same year, he co-founded the Cologne Art Market, which opened in September 1967 in the large hall of Gürzenich. It was the first event of its kind, followed by the first Art Basel in 1967, and the first Fiac in Paris in 1973. In 1970 Zwirner caused a sensation when he bought a work by Roy Liechtenstein for $75,000. Through mergers in 1984, the Cologne Art Market became today's Art Cologne.

In 1972, Zwirner hired Erich Schneider-Wessling, an architect from Cologne, to build a residential and gallery building at Albertusstrasse 18, which was adapted to the new needs of the gallery in its loft-like design. In 1973, Zwirner became a founding member of the European Art Dealers Association, which had emerged from the Association of Progressive German Art Dealers, and took over management of the secretariat until 1975. His first important collectors were Wolfgang Hahn and Peter and Irene Ludwig. He retired from the active gallery business in 1992. In 1991, he was co-founder and director of the Central Archive of the International Art Trade in Bonn. In 1994, he became co-editor of the magazine sediment. He curated the major exhibition Deutschlandbilder with Eckhart Gillen at the Martin-Gropius-Bau in Berlin.

Since 2000, Zwirner has been an honorary professor for art education at the Braunschweig Academy of Fine Arts. In 2006, he received the Art Cologne Prize. His son, David Zwirner, has been running one of the most influential galleries in New York since 1993.

== Personal life ==
He was married to Ursula Reppin (born 1935, Breslau). They had a daughter, Esther, and a son David Zwirner is also an art dealer and gallerist. They divorced in 1974 or 1975, when David was ten, and Zwirner remarried to another Ursula.

He is now married to Dorothea, and they have a daughter, Louisa.
