= David Zwirner =

German art dealer and gallerist

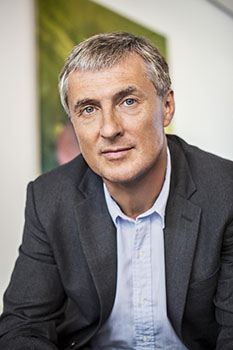
- Born: October 23, 1964 (age 61); Cologne, West Germany
- Occupation: Art dealer
- Spouse: Monica Seeman
- Children: 3
- Parent: Rudolf Zwirner

David Zwirner (born October 23, 1964) is a German art dealer and owner of the David Zwirner Gallery in New York City, Los Angeles, London, Hong Kong, and Paris.

His gallery represents over seventy artists.

== Early life and education ==
Zwirner was born in Cologne, West Germany. The son of art dealer Rudolf Zwirner and his wife Ursula, he was exposed to art at an early age as the family lived in a house with a gallery on the ground floor. At the suggestion of the art dealer Harold Diamond, Rudolf sent David and his sister to the Walden School in New York for one year.

Zwirner left West Germany after high school and attended New York University, where he studied music and performed as a jazz drummer.

== Career ==
On graduating, Zwirner returned to West Germany and worked in Hamburg in A&R for an affiliate of the PolyGram record label. Zwirner moved from working with musical talent to visual artists, and began to build his own art collection, acquiring works by Bernd and Hilla Becher, Hanne Darboven, and Dan Graham. His first job in the United States was with the art dealer Brooke Alexander at Brooke Alexander Gallery.

In 1993, Zwirner opened David Zwirner Gallery in the SoHo neighborhood of New York City with the intention of showcasing an international mix of contemporary artists.

From 2000 to 2009, David Zwirner also partnered with Iwan Wirth in Zwirner & Wirth, a gallery on New York's Upper East Side that focused on private sales. The collaboration yielded a series of exhibitions, including Gerhard Richter: Early Paintings (2000); Bruce Nauman (2001); Cy Twombly: Letter of Resignation (2002/2003); Claes Oldenburg: Early Work (2005); David Hammons (2006); Joseph Beuys: Sculpture and Drawing (2007); and Dan Flavin: The 1964 Green Gallery Exhibition (2008).

In 2002, David Zwirner gallery moved to Chelsea and established three galleries in Chelsea in four years. Zwirner planned to open a new gallery in 2021 on West 21st Street in New York City and would be the first commercial gallery space to be designed by architect Renzo Piano. David Zwirner decided not to move forward with this project in 2024.

Aside from New York, David Zwirner gallery opened a London gallery in 2012, a Hong Kong gallery in 2018, and a Paris gallery in 2019. He also opened 52 Walker, run by Ebony L. Haynes, in 2021 and Los Angeles galleries in Melrose Hill in 2023.

In 2017, David Zwirner established the first commercial online viewing room to sell art online and in 2018, he launched a podcast. In 2021, he announced the creation of a publishing house to make and sell original prints by contemporary artists.

In 2021, Zwirner and his wife Monica proposed to the relevant authorities their plan for the Bridgeford Cottages, an artists’ retreat that would involve the complete reconstruction of 17 cottages and a large single-family house at 31 East Lake Drive in Montauk, New York. The couple also proposed subsidizing the rental fees for the 17 cottages.

== Philanthropy ==
In 2001, Zwirner organized the "I Love NY Art Benefit" exhibition at David Zwirner Gallery to benefit victims of the World Trade Center attacks. A few days after the September 11 attacks, Zwirner asked its artists to donate works to the exhibition. He then called on the help of other New York dealers to organize their own benefit exhibitions. The initiative led to a citywide benefit with more than 150 participating galleries and alternative spaces. As with the exhibition at David Zwirner Gallery, all proceeds raised by the galleries benefited the Robin Hood Relief Fund, part of the Robin Hood Foundation.

In October 2006, May 2008, and July 2015, gallery artist Marcel Dzama organized three charity art auctions and exhibitions at the gallery in New York, all to benefit 826NYC, a nonprofit organization dedicated to supporting young students with their writing skills. Published by McSweeney's Books on the occasion of the 2006 auction, a special limited edition catalog reproduced artworks alongside criticism by eight-year-olds. In March 2011, Zwirner, fellow art dealer, and parent Christopher D'Amelio organized the art donations for the Grace Church School 25th Annual Scholarship Benefit Auction.

In April 2011, actor, director, and philanthropist Ben Stiller joined Zwirner to organize Artists For Haiti (Art Auction), an auction to raise funds for education and health programs for children. The auction took place at Christie's in New York on September 22, 2011. It raised $13,662,000. It said that one hundred percent of the sales would go to support non-profit organizations working in Haiti, including Architecture for Humanity, J/P Haitian Relief Organization, Partners in Health, Grameen Creative Lab, Artists for Peace and Justice, Ciné Institute, and The Stiller Foundation.

In April 2014, Zwirner hosted the annual Acria Unframed Auction to benefit HIV/AIDS research and education programs at his New York gallery. The event raised a record-breaking $1 million for charity. In February 2015, David Zwirner organized the annual auction to benefit Friends Seminary, the oldest continuously coeducational school in New York City. The exhibition featured more than 60 works, many donated by gallery artists, and raised over $500,000 for the school's largest fundraising event to date. In December 2016, gallery artist James Welling selected 65 works for an exhibition and sale to benefit the Foundation for Contemporary Arts (FCA) and grants for individual artists. 16 works were contributed by artists at Welling's invitation and 49 were selected from the FCA's collection, including works from its first benefit exhibition in 1963.

At The New York Times Art Leaders conference in April 2018, Zwirner suggested that upcoming galleries threatened by the rising cost of art admissions to art fairs could be assisted by larger galleries paying more. This was seen as a strategy to prevent the polarised art market from shrinking.

== Other activities ==
- Museum Berggruen, Member of the International Council

== Recognition ==
Since 2012 Zwirner has consistently ranked among the top five of the annual "Power 100" list published by the ArtReview magazine; he has been on the list since 2003. In 2012, he was in second place on Forbes magazine's list of "America's Most Powerful Art Dealers". In 2023, the Observer included him in their list of "The Most Influential People in the Art World Today".

== Personal life ==
Zwirner is married to Monica Seeman. They have three children and reside in New York City.
