= Hauser & Wirth =

Swiss contemporary and modern art gallery

Coordinates: 47.4625°N 9.1203°E

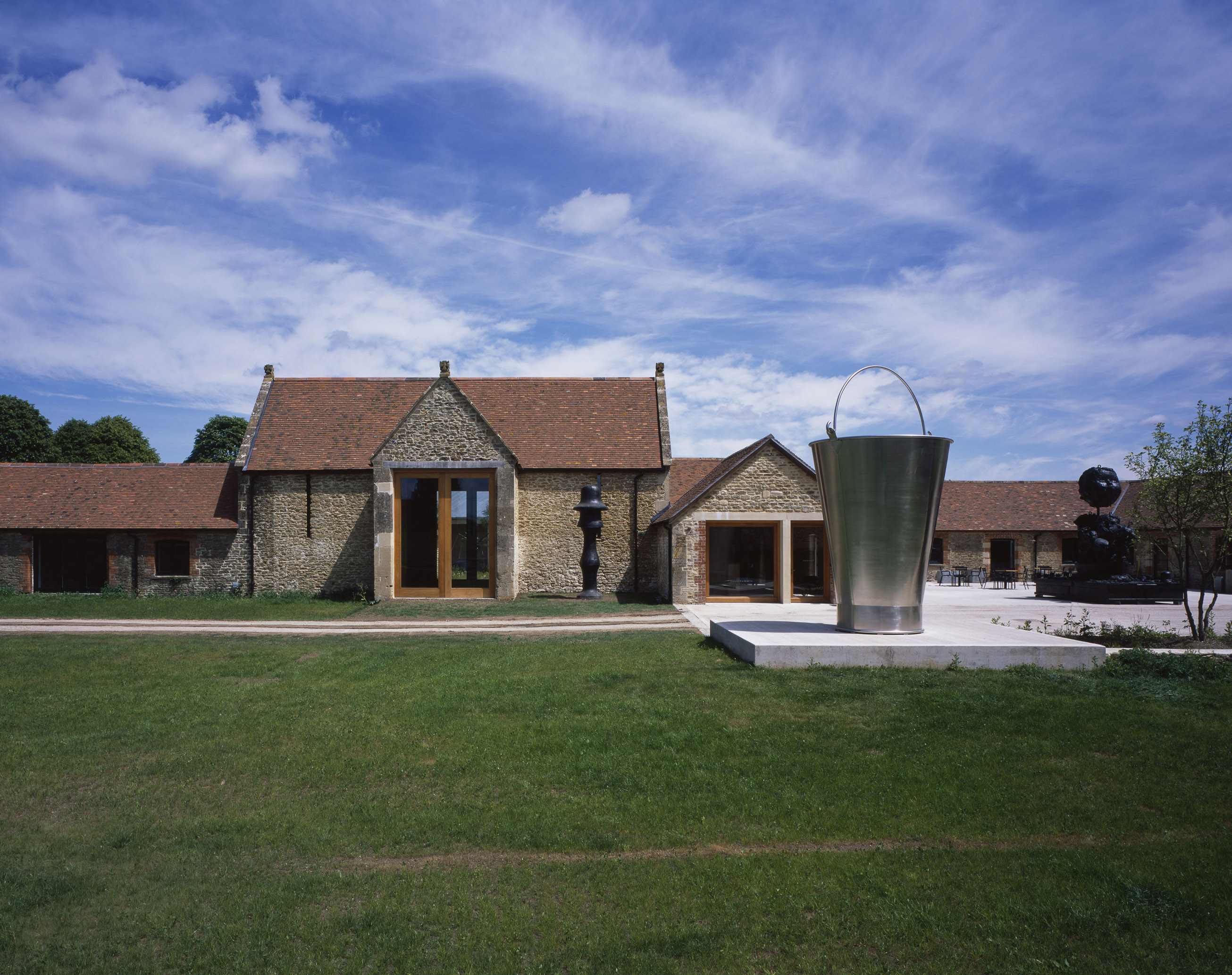
- Hauser and Wirth's premises in Bruton, England
- Industry: Art gallery
- Founded: 1992; 34 years ago
- Founder: Iwan Wirth; Manuela Wirth; Ursula Hauser
- Headquarters: Switzerland
- Website: hauserwirth.com

Hauser & Wirth is a contemporary and modern art gallery headquartered in Switzerland. They have gallery locations in Europe, Asia, and North America.

== History ==
Hauser & Wirth was founded in 1992 in Zurich by Iwan Wirth, Manuela Wirth, and Ursula Hauser, who were joined in 2000 by co-president Marc Payot. In 2020, Ewan Venters was appointed as the first CEO of Hauser & Wirth. Mirella Roma took over the position of CEO in 2024.

The gallery represents over 80 artists and artists' estates, including Frank Bowling, Mark Bradford, Stefan Brüggemann, George Condo, Roni Horn, Rashid Johnson, Paul McCarthy, Christina Quarles, Pipilotti Rist, Lorna Simpson, Uman, and Avery Singer, and is responsible for artist estates and foundations including the Estate of Philip Guston, Louise Bourgeois, and the Jack Whitten Estate.

== Locations and exhibitions ==
Hauser & Wirth has spaces in Europe (Zurich (3 locations), London, Somerset, Gstaad, St. Moritz, Basel, Paris, Menorca, Chillida Leku and Monaco), Asia (Hong Kong) and North America (Manhattan (3 locations), Los Angeles, West Hollywood, and Palo Alto). They previously had a gallery in Southampton, New York.

=== Location history ===
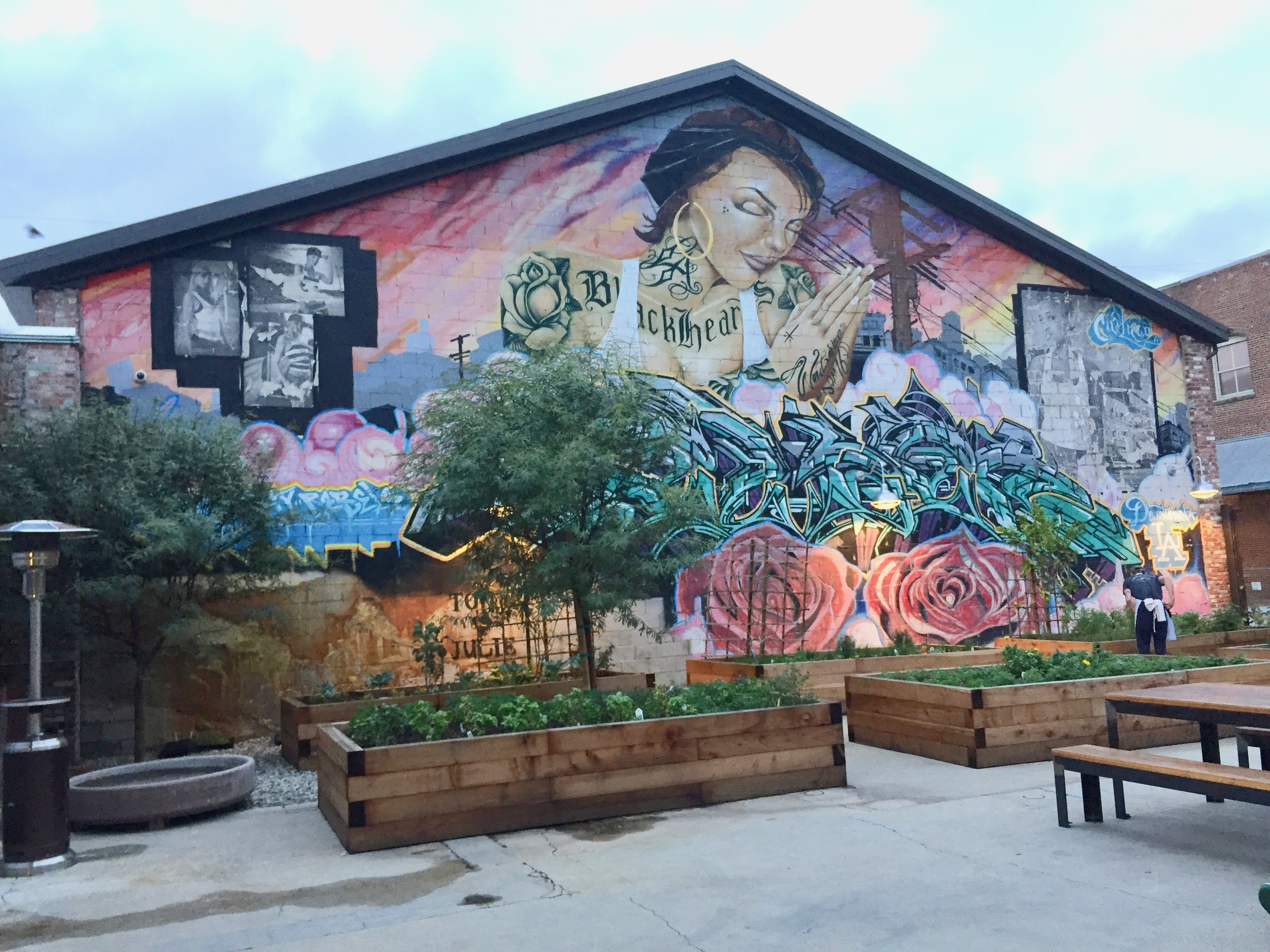
Garden area at Hauser & Wirth, downtown Los Angeles

When the gallery was founded in 1992, it was initially operated from Iwan Wirth's Zurich apartment. The first permanent venue opened in the former Löwenbräu building that became Hauser & Wirth Zürich in 1996, followed by a London branch in an Edward Lutyens-designed former bank on Piccadilly in 2003. In 2013, the gallery opened a space at the former Roxy disco and skating rink in New York. In 2014 the gallery renovated Durslade Farm, a collection of farm buildings in rural Somerset, to create Hauser & Wirth Somerset. The gallery also restored a 100,000 sq. ft. former flour mill, the Globe Mills complex, in downtown Los Angeles in 2016. In 2018, Hauser & Wirth downtown Los Angeles was awarded the Los Angeles Conservancy's Chair's Award.

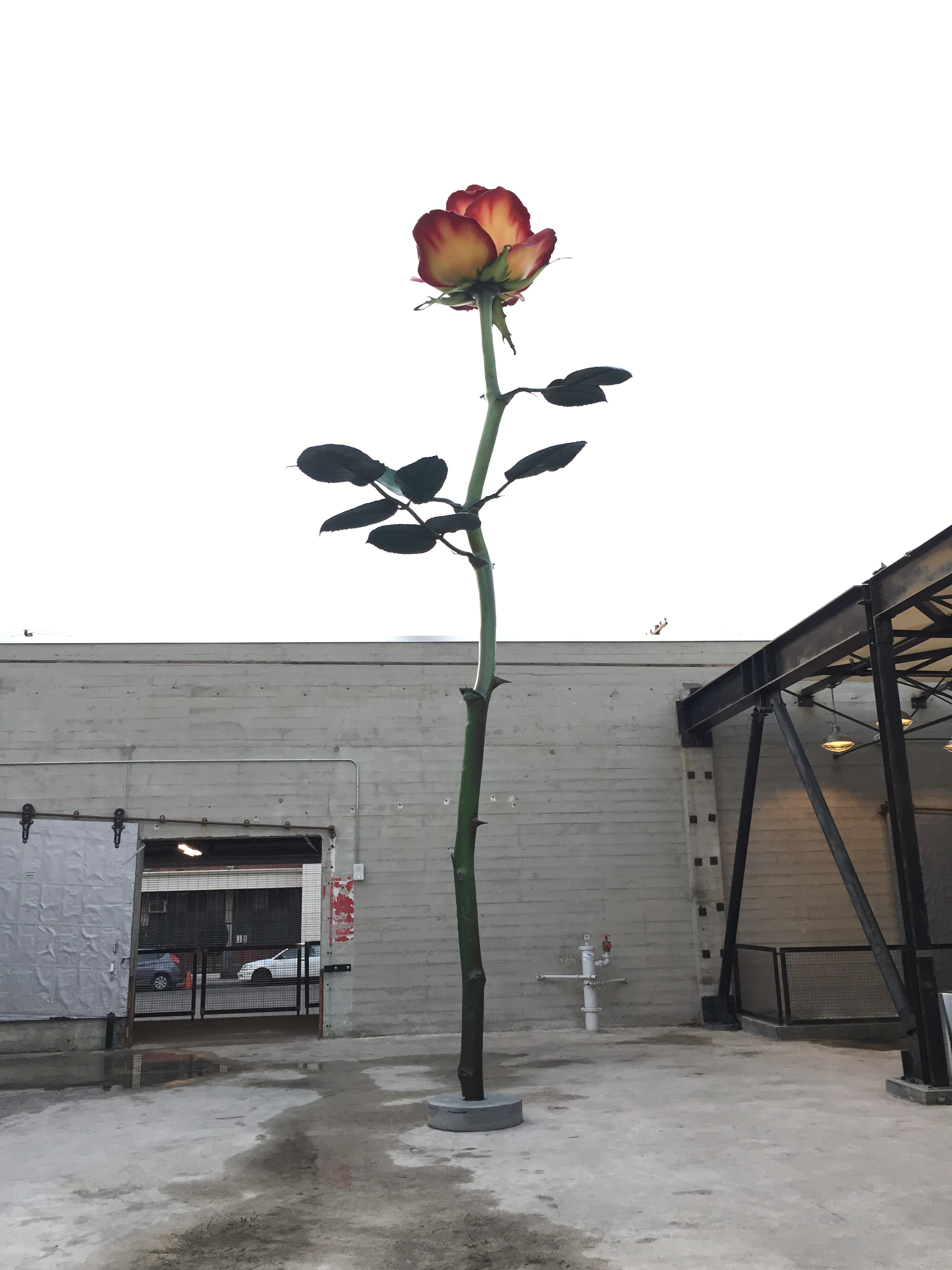
A rose sculpture at Hauser & Wirth, downtown Los Angeles

In spring 2020, Hauser & Wirth opened its first purpose-built gallery space at 542 West 22nd Street in New York's West Chelsea art district, designed by Selldorf Architects. In July 2021, the gallery opened an art center on Illa del Rei, Menorca, after a conservation project overseen by Paris-based architect Luis Laplace, repurposing existing historic buildings on the island. The gallery was awarded the Best Social Responsibility Initiative by the Government of the Balearic Islands in September 2021, listed as one of the '2022 Works of Wonder' by the international editors of Architectural Digest and named 'Best Art Destination' in the Wallpaper* Design Awards 2022. In 2021 Hauser & Wirth acquired the Thomas Goode building at 19 South Audley Street in Mayfair to create a new flagship gallery in London joining its Savile Row space.

In June 2022 the gallery announced the opening of a new space in Paris. Luis Laplace was appointed to oversee renovations of the location, a 19th-century hôtel particulier.

In February 2023, the gallery opened a West Hollywood, California space with an exhibition by artist George Condo.

In July 2025, Hauser & Wirth announced plans to open a location in Palo Alto, California in Spring 2026.

In December 2025, Hauser & Wirth announced plans to open a location in Palermo, Italy in 2030.

=== Exhibitions ===
Since 1992, Hauser & Wirth has mounted exhibitions internationally, including:

- 'Alexander Calder. Mobiles and Gouaches' / 'Joan Miró. Sculptures and Paintings' in Zurich (1992)
- The installation of Roth Bar at Dieter Roth's solo exhibition at the Zurich gallery in 1997
- 'David Hammons' at Hauser & Wirth Zürich (2003); *a presentation of works from the Onnasch Collection at Hauser & Wirth London and New York, 18th Street (2013)
- The inaugural exhibition at Hauser & Wirth Los Angeles: 'Revolution in the Making: Abstract Sculpture by Women, 1947 – 2016' (2016)
- 'Schwitters Miró Arp' at Hauser & Wirth London (2016)
- 'Louise Bourgeois & Pablo Picasso: Anatomies of Desire' at Hauser & Wirth Zürich (2019);
- Hauser & Wirth Menorca's inaugural exhibition 'Mark Bradford. Masses and Movements' (2021).

== Publishers ==
Hauser & Wirth's publishing activity extends back to 1992 and consists of monographs, artists' books, historic exhibition catalogues, collections of artists' writings and catalogues raisonnés. These include 'Eva Hesse Diaries', 'Louise Bourgeois & Pablo Picasso: Anatomies of Desire', and the re-release of the first Marcel Duchamp monograph and catalogue raisonné in 2021.

In June 2019, Hauser & Wirth Publishers opened a stand-alone headquarters and bookshop in the historic center of Zurich, Switzerland. The Zurich headquarters occupies the former home of the Oprecht & Helbling bookshop and the Europa Verlag publishing house.

In 2019, the Hauser & Wirth Publishers' book Dubuffet and the City: People, Place, and Urban Space by Sophie Berrebi received the Richard Schlagman Art Book Awards for art history and best book design. 'Alexander Calder: From the Stony River to the Sky', designed by Atelier Dyakova, received the 2020 German Design Award. In 2021, 'Marcel Duchamp' was named one of the best art books of the year by the New York Times, ARTnews, and Wallpaper*.

In September 2018, Hauser & Wirth announced plans for a quarterly art magazine called Ursula (after their co-founder Ursula Hauser) with Randy Kennedy as executive editor. Its first issue was published in December 2018.

== Partnerships and learning ==
Hauser & Wirth Somerset began an artist-in-residence program in 2013 inviting artists to spend an extended period of time living and working in Bruton. Previous artists-in-residence include Pipilotti Rist, Bharti Kher, Mark Wallinger, Rashid Johnson, Martin Creed, Henry Taylor, and Thomas J Price.

Hauser & Wirth collaborates with local educational institution Cal State LA, and in 2019, Cal State LA's television, film, and media studies department received a one-million dollar grant from the gallery. Hauser & Wirth has partnered with CalArts and the Bath School of Art and Design, Bath Spa University (UK) on an annual MFA residency exchange program at its Los Angeles and Somerset galleries, which launched in 2017.

Since 2020, Hauser & Wirth has collaborated with Hunter College, hosting exhibitions of artists' work enrolled in the school's MFA Program in Studio Art both online and at Hauser & Wirth New York, as well as with the South London Gallery. In October 2020, the gallery brought together more than 100 artists for 'Artists For New York' to support several local museums and organizations that had been profoundly impacted by the COVID-19 pandemic.

In Somerset, the gallery formed Arthaus for young people who are interested in learning more about art and architecture. Hauser & Wirth launched The Gustav Metzger Foundation Scholarship in 2021, partnering with Dartington Arts School by supporting a student on the 'Arts and Place' MA course. Also in 2021, Hauser & Wirth Menorca launched its first Education Lab during its inaugural exhibition with Mark Bradford. The artist led an art education residency with students from l'Escola d'Art de Menorca.

In November 2022, Iwan Wirth announced the gallery's first online auction, "Art for Better", which supported the humanitarian aid programs of UNHCR, the UN Refugee Agency. The gallery raised US$4,585,000, with all proceeds going to support UNHCR. All of the twelve offered lots were sold at the auction and were donated by gallery artists Rita Ackermann, Larry Bell, Frank Bowling, George Condo, Martin Creed, Estate Günther Förg, Rashid Johnson, Glenn Ligon, Angel Otero, Thomas J Price, Avery Singer and Anj Smith.

== Sustainability ==
In March 2021, Hauser & Wirth appointed a full-time Head of Environmental Sustainability to work on the gallery's climate action plan and commitment to halve the gallery's carbon emissions by 2030. In 2021, the gallery began to calculate the carbon produced by exhibitions and fairs using this data to set carbon budgets to achieve a commitment to the Paris agreement of 50% reduction. In addition, Hauser & Wirth has enrolled in the Science Based Targets initiative (SBTi), to measure, track and monitor reductions. An exhibition of Gustav Metzger at Hauser & Wirth Somerset in 2021 is the first show to have a Climate Impact Report (CIR) published on the artist-led sustainability platform Artists Commit.

Hauser & Wirth is a patron of the Gallery Climate Coalition (GCC) and also supports Art to Acres, an initiative for artists, gallerists and collectors with a mission to support large-scale land conservation, launching fundraising prints with artists such as Jenny Holzer in 2020. In 2021, the gallery partnered with the Menorca Preservation Fund upon the opening of the gallery in Menorca, a UNESCO Biosphere Reserve.

In 2023, Hauser & Wirth unveiled its new collective impact initiative through a collaboration with Nicola Vassell of co-representation of Uman.

== Gallery ==
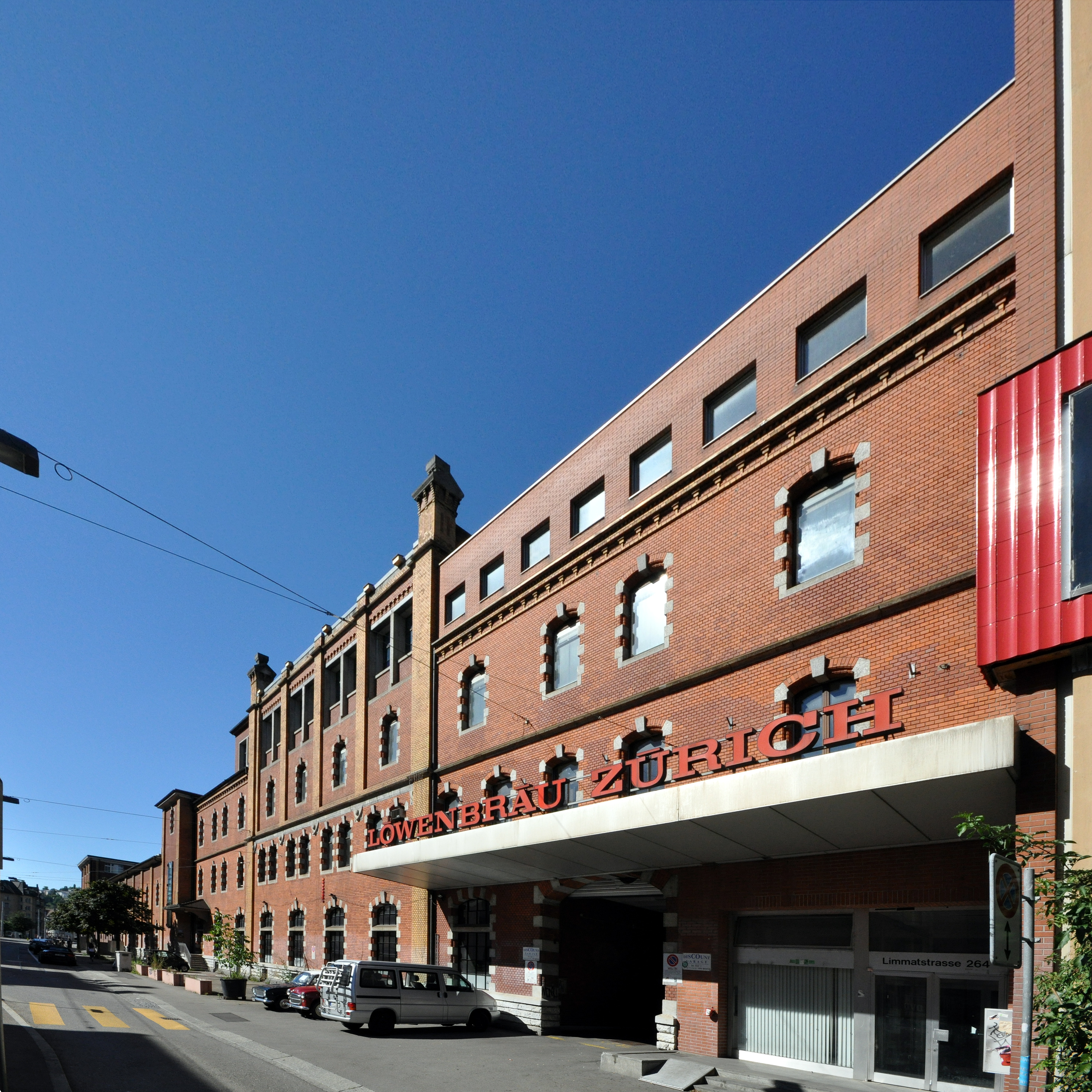
The former Löwenbräu brewery in Zürich, Switzerland

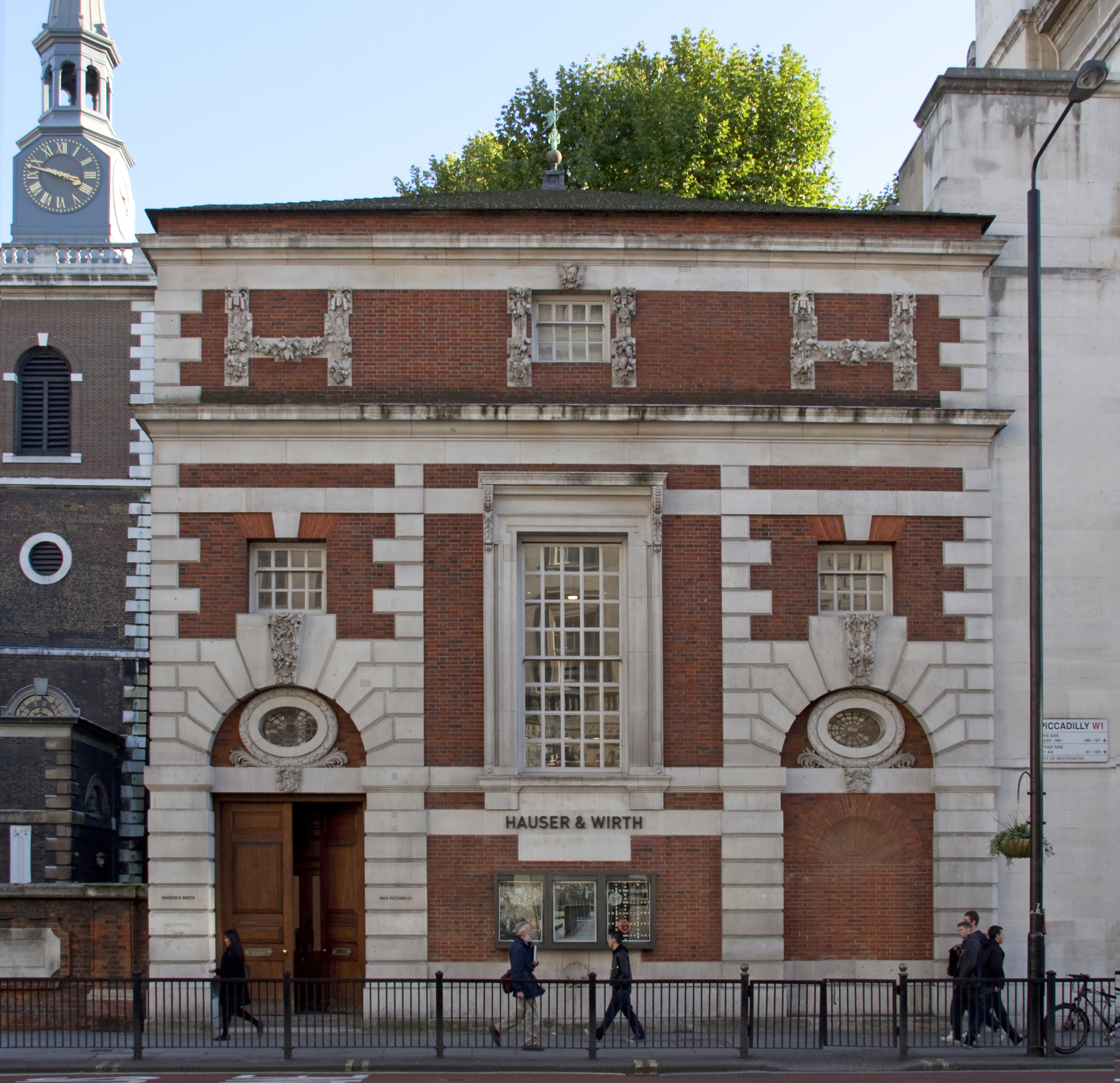
The Midland Bank building by Sir Edwin Lutyens at 196A Piccadilly, built 1922–1923, photographed in 2010

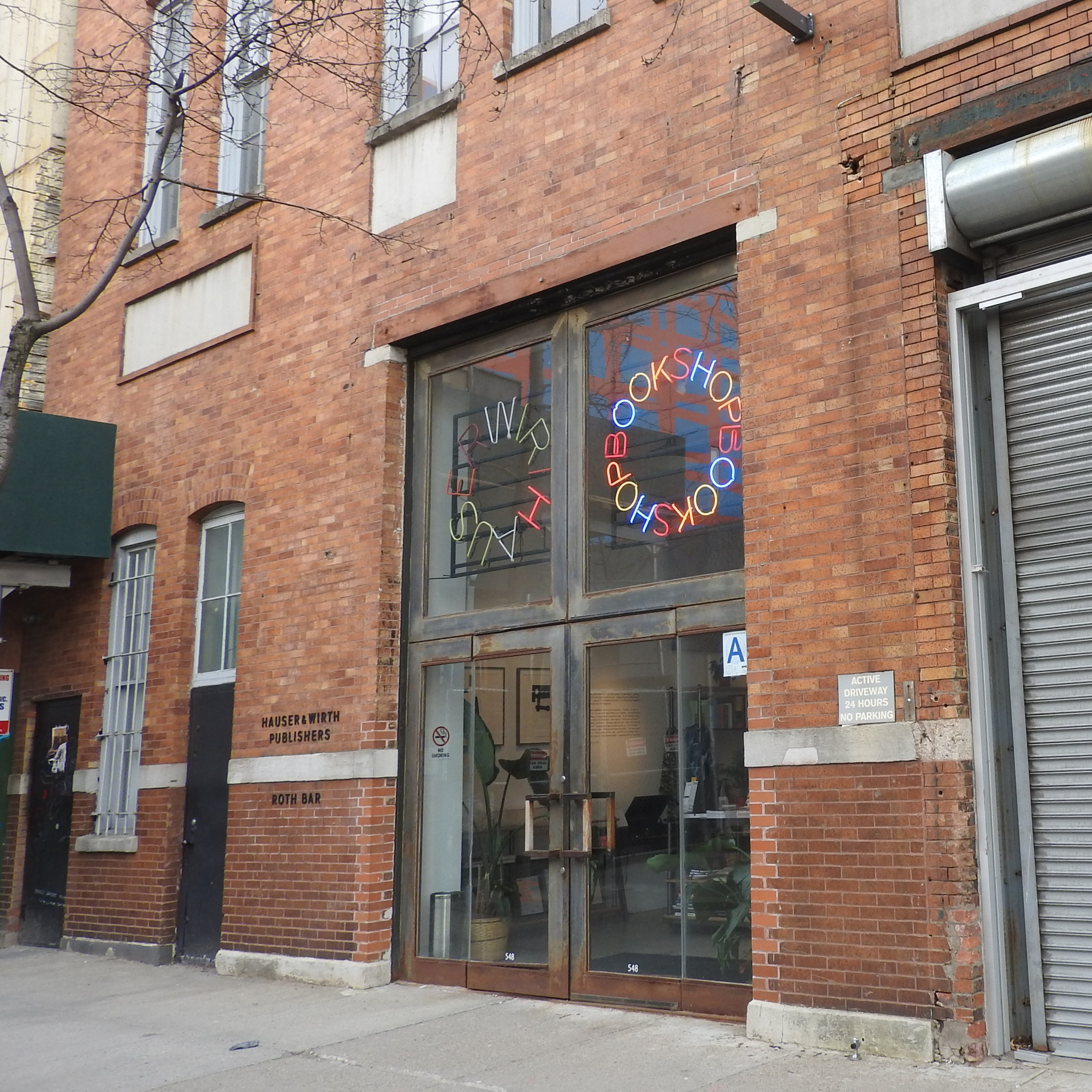
Shop in Chelsea, Manhattan
