= Museum of Menorca =

Coordinates: 39.8911°N 4.2608°E

- Museu de Menorca (Catalan)
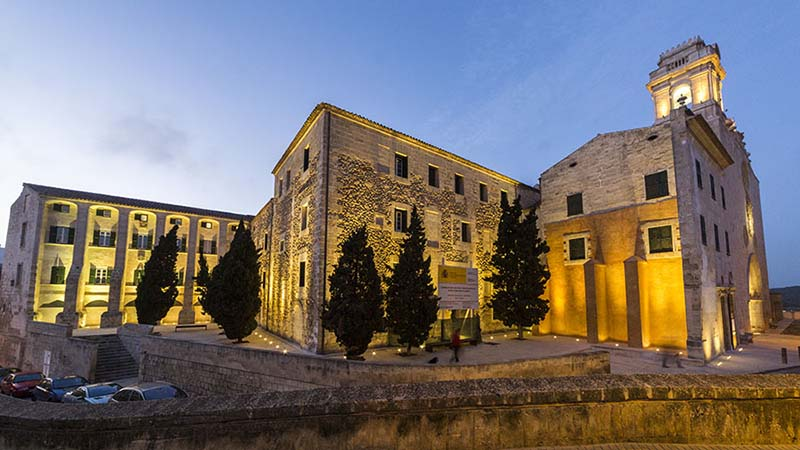
- Museu de Menorca
- Interactive map of Museum of Menorca
- Location: Mahón, Spain

Museo de Menorca (Museum of Menorca) is a public institution located in the city of Mahón, Balearic Islands, Spain, which is devoted to the research and diffusion of the prehistory and history of Menorca.

== Location and contents ==
The museum is located in Avenida del Doctor Guàrdia, s/n, Mahón.

The museum's collection is formed by artifacts which were held in the previous museum, from archaeological excavations conducted in the past few years and deposits and donations from private people and several institutions.

The permanent exhibition was completely renovated during 2017-2018 and reopened to visitors in July 2018. Nowadays the museum also holds temporary exhibitions on the ground floor.

Museo de Menorca is the leading institution in the diffusion of Menorca's heritage and cultural landscape and has fostered an important task in the research of the Prehistory of the island.

== History ==
The preceding museum was Museo Municipal de Mahón (Municipal Museum of Mahón), which was opened on November 4, 1889, in the old building of Principal de Guardia, opposite the town hall. Its promoter was Joan Seguí Rodríguez and its initial collection consisted of private donations. The first artifacts, which were fragments of Roman tombs from Mahón, were donated by Pere Monjo Monjo, who was the museum's curator.

In 1890, after the death of the founder of the museum, the city council appointed the staff meeting of the high school as curators of the collection. In 1898 Francesc Hernández Sanz, teacher of the high school, was in charge of consolidating the curacy of the collection.

In 1906, the museum collection was moved to Museo del Ateneo, where it stayed until 1944, when they became part of the recently inaugurated Museo Provincial de Bellas Artes (Provincial Museum of Fine Arts), organized by Félix Merino and M. Lluïsa Serra. Mahón City Council ceded Can Mercadal palace, home to the House of Culture and currently the public library, where the new museum was placed in November 1948. Moreover, Ateneo de Mahón donated artifacts which, along those from the Commission of Excavations, Sub-commission of Monuments and others from private collections, increased the Museum collection a great deal.

From 1953 to 1967, under the direction of M. Lluïsa Serra, the collection continued increasing with the acquisition of artwork and donations from Menorcan painters, and important tasks of documentation and diffusion were carried out too. In this period the museum also kept archaeological materials from important sites that were under research in that time, such as Naveta d'Es Tudons, Rafal Rubí naveta, the settlement of Talatí de Dalt, Fornàs de Torelló and Illa del Rey basilicas, among others.

In 1975, under the name of Museu de Menorca, it was included in the National Board of Museums. However, the building had structural problems that caused its closure. Five years later, in 1980, a building belonging to Mahón city council was donated to the State, which was the old Franciscan convent, which became the new and permanent home to the museum.

In 1984, the government of the Balearic Islands started managing the museum. In 1986 part of the refurbished building reopened for the public. The restoration of the cloister of Saint Francis gave new items to the museum: 17th and 18th century pottery and 18th and 19th century multi-coloured tiles. Temporary rooms were open to the public in 1995 and the permanent rooms did so three years later, when the new headquarters of the museum were officially opened.

The museum's collection has grown over the years thanks to the work carried out by institutions such as Boston University, the University of Cagliari and the University of the Balearic Islands, as well as thanks the work performed by several research teams formed by numerous archaeologists. Also, the artefacts found by Margaret Murray during her excavations in the 1930s were recovered from Cambridge and taken to the museum.

Donations and deposits of ethnological, artistic and industrial materials from various entities and private individuals, mostly between the end of the 20th century and beginning of the 21st century, increased the collection a great deal.

Since 2007, a team of archaeologists from the museum carry out archaeological research at the site of Cornia Nou, which is a Talayotic settlement located near Mahón which counts with two layouts and related buildings.

The council government of the island manages the museum since 2011. In July 2018 the museum reopened after refurbishment works and the setting of an up-to-date permanent exhibition.

== Building ==
The building was built between the 17th and the 18th centuries. The current headquarters of Museu de Menorca are located in the old Franciscan convent which once belonged to the church of Saint Francis located next to it. Its origins date back to the 15th century, although this first convent was destroyed during the Turkish attack of Mahón in 1535.

The building where the museum is located was built between the 17th and the 18th centuries, and was refurbished at the beginning of the 19th century.

In the ground floor of the convent there was the reception, the chapter house, the kitchen, the pantry, the cellar, the refectory and the schools of grammar and philosophy. The cells of the friars and other rooms were located in the upper floors. The Franciscans were forced to leave the convent in 1835, after the confiscation of the church by Juan Álvarez Mendizábal. The building was donated to the city and used by several entities for various educational and cultural functions before it became the museum: house of mercy, nautical school, public library and high school.

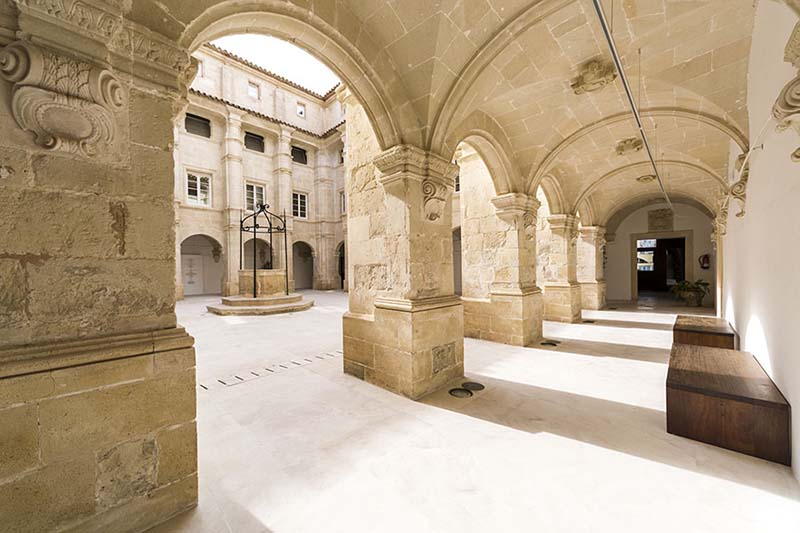
The cloister of the Museum of Menorca

It is arranged in three floors that surround the Baroque squared-shaped cloister, with lower arches and a wing to its South. Several Classical orders combine with Baroque elements. The temporary exhibition rooms and the assembly hall are located in the ground floor, whereas the first and second floors hold the permanent exhibition.

== Research ==
Museo de Menorca is a frame of reference for the study of the Prehistory, the History and the culture of Menorca, with a collection composed of 200,000 objects. It also has an area where researchers can study the artifacts from this collection.

It also has a library open to the public, which counts with a large collection of books and documents on Art and Archaeology, as well as books, journals, catalogues and manuals devoted to various aspects of History, Ethnography, Geography and Culture from Menorca. Most of the archaeological books are highly specialized and cannot be found in other libraries from the island.

Periodically the museum publishes scientific archaeological work, collection guides, catalogues of temporary exhibitions and publications for educational purposes that offer the opportunity to learn about the History of the island.

== Visits and activities ==
The museum offers four types of visits: guided visits, family visits, group visits and visits for schools.

Guided visits are open to groups and prepared according to the interests of the requestor. They include the visit to the temporary rooms and the site of Cornia Nou.

Families can visit the museum with the help of the staff or asking for a guided tour.

The museum designs visits for groups, both free and guided, depending on the needs of the visitors.

For schools, the museum prepares visits focusing on one or several periods, and designing the routes for each educational level or the needs of students.

Moreover, Museu de Menorca organises activities addressed to several types of groups, including workshops for children, gymkhanas, nights at the museum, specialised visits, lectures and presentations of artefacts.

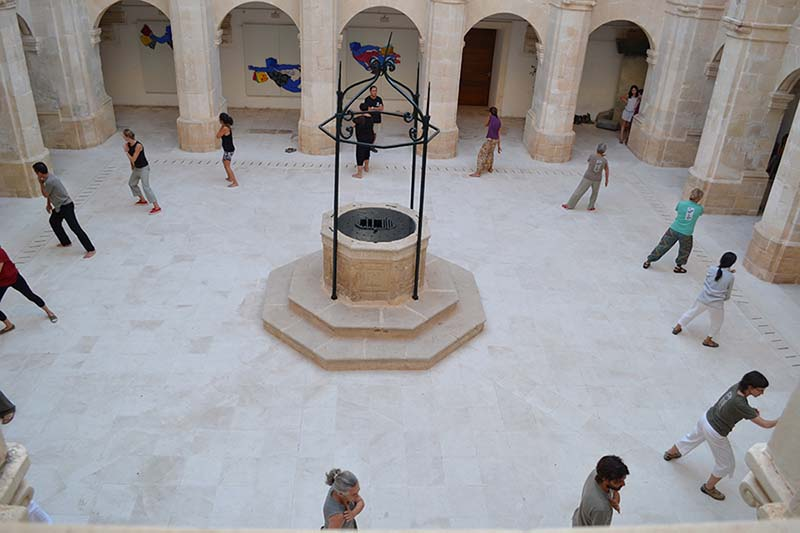
Activities in the Museum of Menorca

== Main publications edited by Museu de Menorca ==
- Algunas consideraciones sobre los Sepulcros Megalíticos de Menorca. Lluís Plantalamor Massanet. 1975-1976 (esgotat).
- Busto del Emperador Tiberio hallado en Mahón. Alberto Balil. 1985.
- El vaso de fondo alto menorquín. Estudio tipológico y decorativo. Jaime Sastre Moll. 1985.
- El jarrito picudo cicládico supuestamente hallado en Menorca. Celia Topp. 1985.
- El elemento púnico en la cultura talayótica. V.M. Guerrero, L. Plantalamor, C. Rita. 1986.
- Ferrer de Montpalau “Lo cavaller de Martinell”. Entre Jaume III de Mallorca i Pere IV d’Aragó. Gabriel Llompart. 1987.
- Prospecció arqueològica de la zona de Son Mercer (Ferreries-Menorca). M.Cristina Rita, Jaume Murillo.1989.
- L’ofici de mestre d’aixa a l’illa de Menorca. Cristina Andreu, Jaume Murillo. 1989.
- Las barracas menorquina. Construcciones rurales de piedra seca. J. Sastre Moll. 1989.
- Assaig de catalogació dels molins de vent fariners de l’illa de Menorca. Antoni López Pons, Jaume Murillo Orfila. 1990.
- Excavaciones de urgencia en la plaza de la Conquista de Mahón. Hallazgo de un basurero romano. M. Cristina Rita. 1990.
- L’arquitectura prehistòrica i protohistòrica de Menorca i el seu marc cultural. L. Plantalamor Massanet. 1992
- El poblament de Menorca; de la prehistòria a la baixa romanitat (aproximació a una proposta d’anàlisi de distribució espacial). G. Juan Benejam. 1993.
- Les taules a Menorca. Un estudi arqueoastronòmic. Peter Hochsieder i Doris Knösel. 1995.
- L’aixecament planimètric de Cala’n Morell (Ciutadella-Menorca). G. Juan Benejam i L. Plantalamor Massanet. 1996.
- Les coves 11 i 12 de Cala’n Morell. G. Juan Benejam i L. Plantalamor Massanet. 1996.
- Les rajoles policromades del convent de sant Francesc (Maó). Cristina Andreu Adame. 1996.
- Caracterització de la ceràmica pretalaiòtica de Menorca, mitjançant la datació per termoluminiscència. Jordi Garcia Orellana. 1998.
- El retaule de sant Antoni Abat. Estudi i restauració. Francesc Isbert Vaquer i Josep Pascual Peris. 1997.
- Cronologia de la prehistòria de Menorca (noves datacions de C14). Lluís Plantalamor Massanet i Marck Va Strydonck. 1997.
- Excavacions a la naveta d’habitació de Cala Blanca (Ciutadella). G. Juan Benejam i L. Plantalamor Massanet. 1997.
- Carta de Sever de Menorca. Anàlisi de les principals cites bíbliques. Josep Sastre Portella. 2000.
- Caracterització de les ceràmiques prehistòriques de l’illa de Menorca. J. Garcia Orellana, J. Molera Marimon i M. Vendrell Sanz. 2001.
- Biniai Nou. El megalitisme mediterrani a Menorca. Lluís Plantalamor i Josep Marquès. 2001.
- J. Vives Llull, l’home i el col·leccionista. Coordinació del catàleg Cristina Andreu i Francesc Isbert. 2001.
- El sepulcre d’Alcaidús. El megalistisme de Menorca en el context de la Mediterrània occidental. Lluís Plantalamor Massanet i Josep Marquès Moll. 2003.
- Son Real (santa Margalida-Mallorca). Informe de l’excavació arqueològica al sepulcre megalític. L. Plantalamor, J. Marquès. D. Ramis, I. Moll i S. Villalonga. 2004.
- Sant Tomàs (Es Migjorn Gran) L’hipogeu amb façana megalítica. L. Plantalamor, J. Moll, F. García i A. Puertas
- Talatí de Dalt 1997–2001. 5 anys d’investigació a un jaciment talaiòtic tipus de Menorca. G. Juan Benejam, J. Pons Machado i altres. 2005
- Monument funerari de Son Olivares. Lluís Plantalamor Massanet, Sílvia Villalonga Garcia i Josep Marqués Moll. 2008

== Bibliography ==
- Serra Belabre, M. L. (1963). Breve guía del Museo Provincial de Bellas Artes de Mahón. Panorama Balear, 83, Maó.
- Serra Belabre, M. L. (1967). La Casa de la Cultura de Mahón. Escuela Tipográfica Provincial. Palma de Mallorca.

Andreu Adame, Cristina (2015). “Origen i formació de les col·leccions del Museu de Menorca”, in Miscel·lània d’estudis en homenatge a Lluís Plantalamor Massanet. Palma: Govern de les Illes Balears. p. 45-57.
