= Helmsley Building =

Office skyscraper in Manhattan, New York

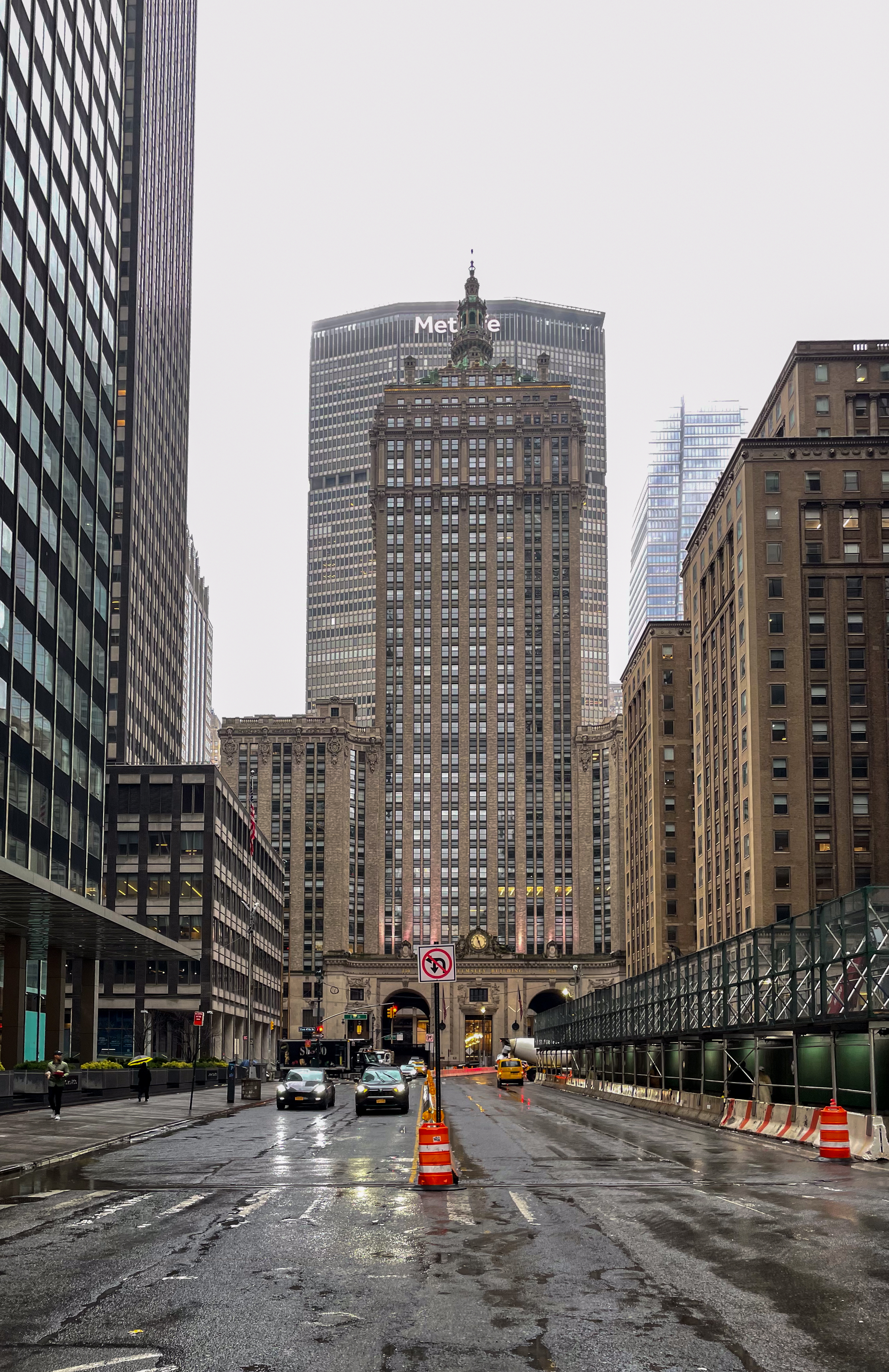
- The Helmsley Building as seen from Park Avenue on March 2, 2024, with the MetLife Building in the background
- Former names: New York General Building (1958–1978); New York Central Building (1929–1958)

General information
- Status: Completed
- Type: Office
- Architectural style: Beaux-Arts
- Location: 230 Park Avenue; New York, NY 10169; U.S.
- Coordinates: 40°45′16″N 73°58′33″W
- Construction started: 1927
- Completed: 1929
- Renovated: 2004
- Owner: RXR Realty

Height
- Height: 565 feet (172 m)

Technical details
- Floor count: 35
- Lifts/elevators: 25

Design and construction
- Architecture firm: Warren and Wetmore
- Developer: New York Central Railroad Company

Website
- helmsleybuilding.com

New York City Landmark
- Designated: March 31, 1987
- Reference no.: 1297 (exterior); 1298 (interior)

The Helmsley Building is a 35-story skyscraper at 230 Park Avenue between East 45th and 46th Streets, just north of Grand Central Terminal, in the Midtown Manhattan neighborhood of New York City. It was built between 1927 and 1929 as the New York Central Building, and was designed by Warren & Wetmore in the Beaux-Arts style. The building has been described as the last major project built as part of the Terminal City complex around Grand Central.

The facade of the four-story base is composed of limestone and Texas pink granite, while the upper stories are clad with brick. The top of the Helmsley Building is a pyramid with an ornate cupola. Vehicular traffic is carried through its base, with traffic entering and exiting the Park Avenue Viaduct through two portals. Flanking the viaduct's ramps are passageways connecting 45th and 46th Streets, with entrances to Grand Central Terminal. The lobby of the building is between the vehicular portals and contains bronze and marble detailing. The Helmsley Building has 1.4 million square feet (130,000 m^{2}) of office space.

Before the construction of Grand Central Terminal, the area to the north of the predecessor Grand Central Depot was occupied by an open-air rail yard; the tracks and depot were operated by the New York Central Railroad. After the terminal was completed in 1913, the tracks were buried under a series of buildings that were constructed over the tracks as part of the Terminal City development. The New York Central Building was renamed the New York General Building in 1958 and the Helmsley Building in 1978, though ownership was changed several times afterward. The building's facade and lobby became New York City designated landmarks in 1987. RXR Realty has owned the building since 2015.

== Site ==
The Helmsley Building was developed as part of the original "Terminal City" complex above Grand Central Terminal's rail yards. It straddles the ramps of the Park Avenue Viaduct in the Midtown Manhattan neighborhood of New York City, bounded by 45th Street to the south, Vanderbilt Avenue to the west, 46th Street to the north, and Depew Place to the east. (Note: Depew Place runs along the east side of Grand Central Terminal and is no longer a public street, having been converted to a pedestrian mall and parking lot in 1982.) The building has an address of 230 Park Avenue and is assigned its own ZIP Code, 10169; it was one of 41 buildings in Manhattan that had their own ZIP Codes as of 2019. The Helmsley Building measures 200 feet (61 m) north-south and 344 feet (105 m) west-east.

Immediately to the south are Grand Central Terminal and the MetLife Building. In addition, the building is near 50 Vanderbilt Avenue to the southwest, the Roosevelt Hotel to the west, 383 Madison Avenue to the northwest, 245 Park Avenue to the northeast, and 450 Lexington Avenue to the southeast.

== Architecture ==
The Helmsley Building was designed by Warren & Wetmore in the Beaux-Arts style. Its design is influenced by that of the Manhattan Municipal Building in Lower Manhattan—which also spanned a street, Chambers Street—and includes side wings projecting to the west and east. The wings slightly resemble the "court of honor" designed by Reed and Stem, another collaborator in the Grand Central project.

Inside the base are two S-ramps carrying Park Avenue to the Park Avenue Viaduct between 45th and 46th Streets. The western ramp carries southbound traffic and the eastern ramp the northbound. The building's lobby lies between the portals, with storefront-lined pedestrian arcades running on the outside of either ramp. The arcades are connected to Grand Central North, a system of passageways that lead to Grand Central, which opened in 1999.

The eastern and western wings are each 15 stories tall, with a centrally positioned tower rising to 35 stories. The lowest four stories comprise the base, which include the lobbies and the viaduct ramps. The eleven stories above it comprise an office block with a floor plan shaped like an irregular "H" aligned west–east. The western wings project further than the eastern wings, and the center of the northern facade curves slightly inward. The 20-story tower has a floor plan measuring 143.5 by 123 feet (43.7 by 37.5 m). It terminates in a pyramidal roof with an octagonal base.

=== Facade ===
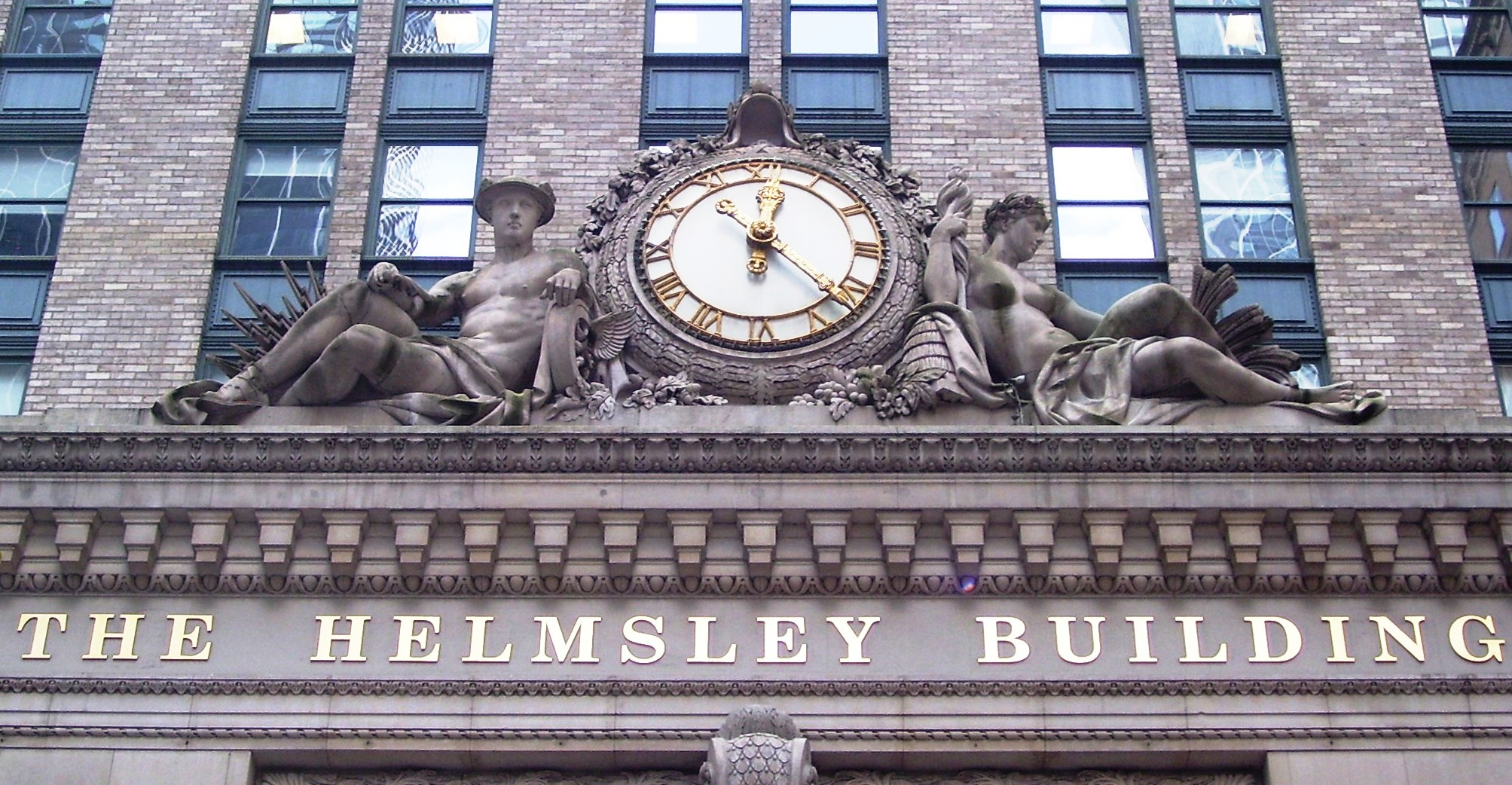
Clock and sculptures over the entrance

The facade of the four-story base is composed of limestone and Texas pink granite. It includes bronze grilles as well as sculptures depicting industrial progress. A 9-foot (2.7 m) diameter clock sits atop the base, 64 feet (20 m) above the ground, flanked on its left by a figure of the god Mercury, representing transportation, and on its right by a figure of the goddess Ceres, representing agriculture. The composition measures 19 feet (5.8 m) tall by 45 feet (14 m) wide and was designed by Edward McCartan. The windows on the base contain one of four types of display-window designs: the original designs installed with the rest of the building in 1929, and one of three modifications. The pedimental sculptures were carved by the Ardolino Brothers.

The upper stories are faced with brick. The northern facade of the fifth through 15th stories curve along the wings. The facade of this section contains paired sash windows with decorative metal spandrels, as well as limestone keystones above the windows on the 15th story. Above the 15th floor is a cornice with 78 terracotta bison heads, symbolizing industry. The cornice also contains images of Mercury's winged helmet, winged wheels representing advancement, scrolls of wisdom, wheels of progress, and other motifs. The 15th story of the eastern facade had a sky bridge that connected to 466 Lexington Avenue until 1982.

The 16th through 35th-story facades are faced with brick and contain paired sash windows, with identical decorative elements on all sides. Above the 28th floor are limestone keystones over the windows, as well as a cornice with brackets. There is an ornate entablature above the 31st floor; keystones above the 32nd-floor windows; bracketed keystones above the 33rd floor windows; and an observation deck on the 33rd floor. The last full floor, the 34th, has three pairs of dormered windows on all sides.

The top of the Helmsley Building is a pyramid with an ornate cupola. The roof was lit at night by electric floodlights and torches with up to 100,000 candlepower. At the pinnacle were "32-marine-type fixtures" that each had a capacity of up to 100 watts. The cupola had oval openings and was topped by a glass ball with a 6,000 watt lantern. Eight projectors, one from each corner of the octagon's base, also illuminated the roof. The lighting made the Helmsley Building a point of interest that could be seen from several miles away. When the Helmsley Building was completed, the copper roof was gilded, but by the late 1950s had been painted green. The gilding was restored in the 1970s and removed in 2002.

=== Features ===
The building has 1.4 million sq ft (130,000 m^{2}) of office space. Of this, the lower 15 floors each have an area of 56,000 square feet (5,200 m^{2}) and the upper 20 floors each cover 16,800 square feet (1,560 m^{2}). The building was erected with 40 elevators, only 25 of which were in use as of 2022.

==== Structural features ====
The building uses 26,922 short tons (24,038 long tons; 24,423 t) of steel, of which 9,000 short tons (8,000 long tons; 8,200 t) went into the foundation. There are two levels of tracks underneath the building. Due to the different track layouts on each level, the columns on each level were offset, preventing through-columns from being built. Furthermore, the tracks were electrified and more than 700 trains passed through each day. As a solution, girders were installed above the lower track level, and the steel frame for the building was placed upon these girders and insulated with vibration-proof mats and cork tubes.

The Helmsley Building did not have basements because that space was occupied by the tracks. Because of this, the machinery, utilities, and storage areas were installed on the 15th floor.

==== Lobby ====
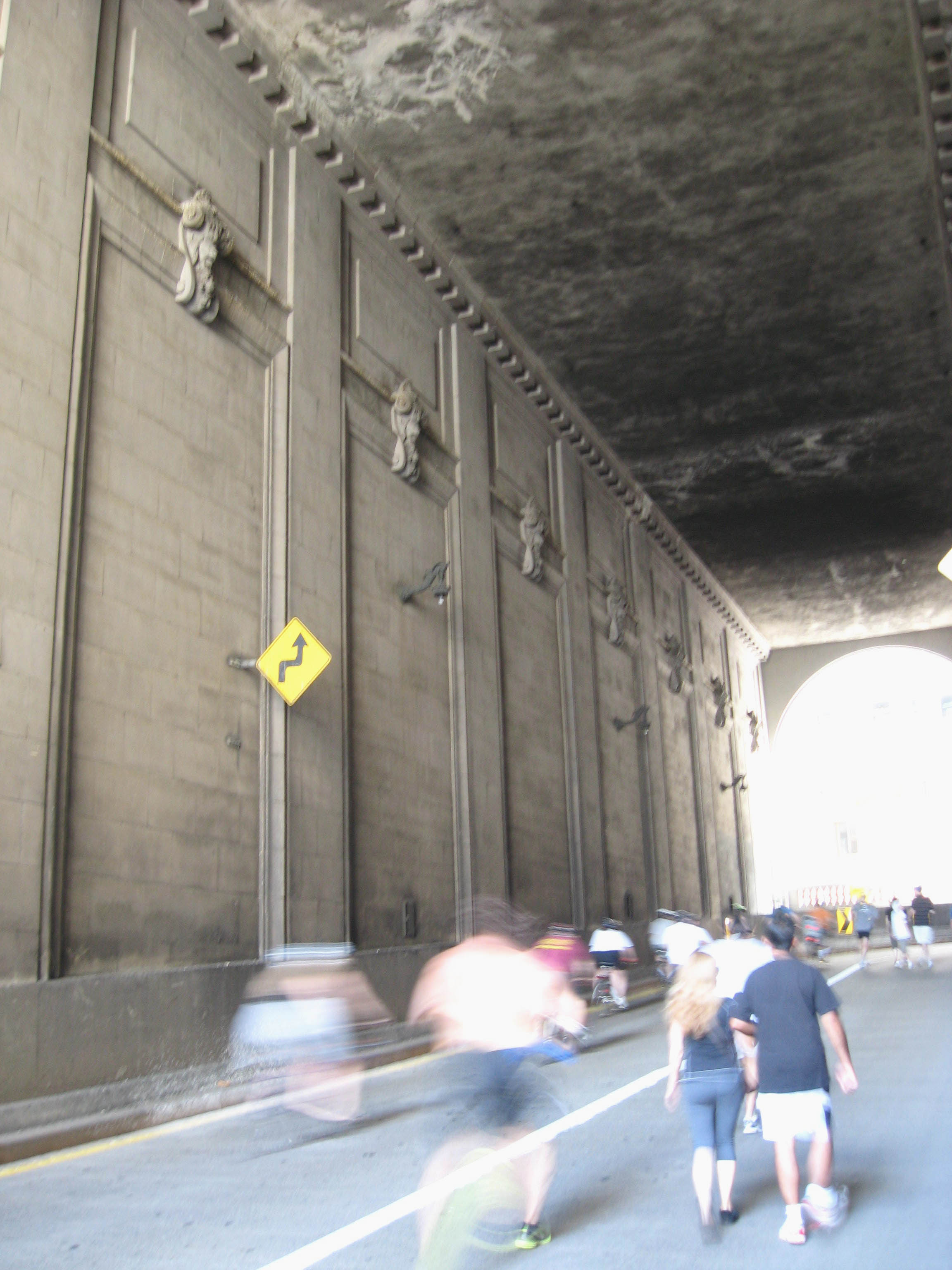
Park Avenue Viaduct ramps

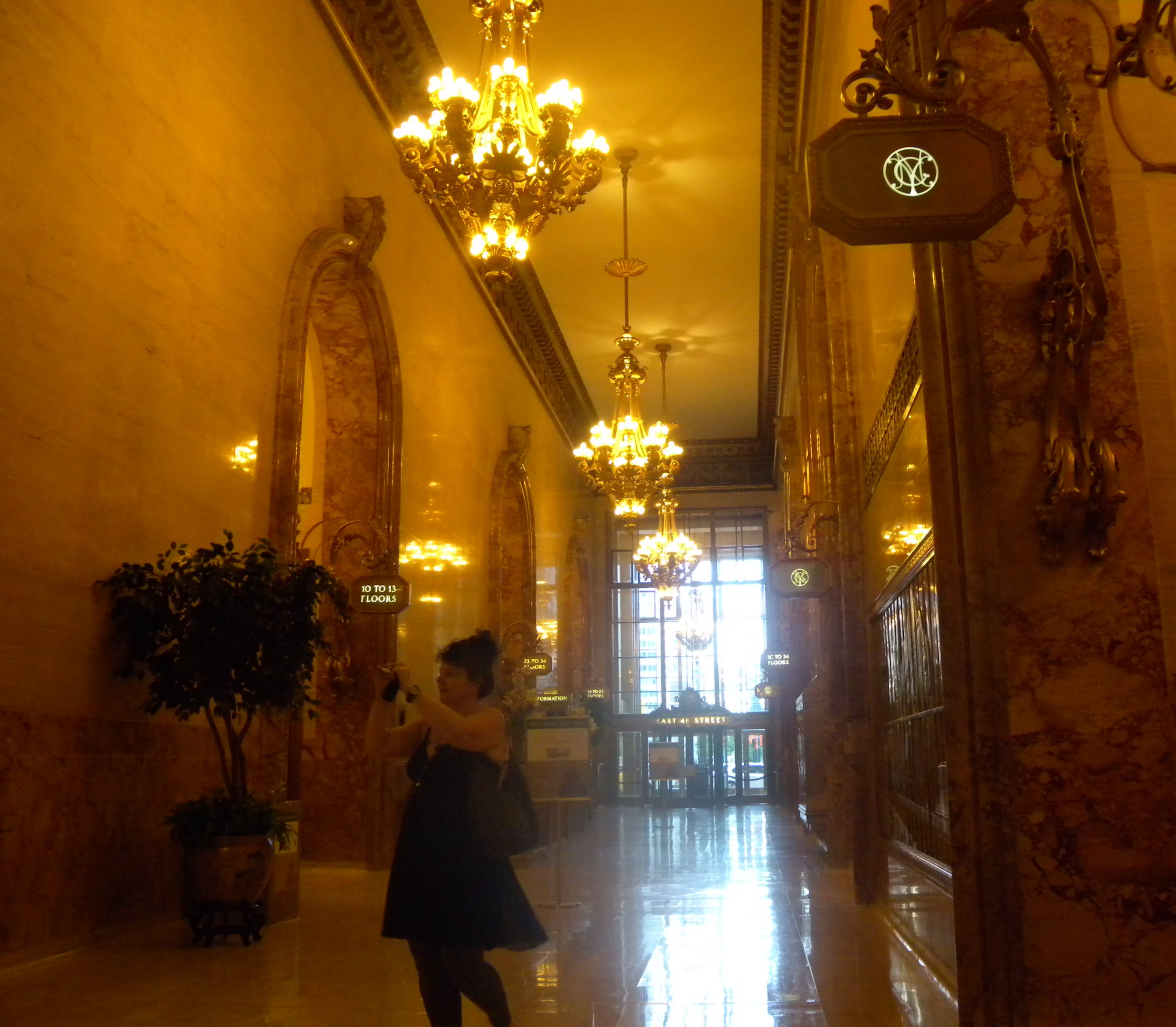
Interior of the lobby

The lobby's interior is designed to evoke New York Central's "prowess". This is evidenced in the walls, which are made of marble, as well as the detailing of the bronze, where the railroad's initials are repeated many times. A vestibule leads from 46th Street and contains multi-pane windows, bronze doors, a chandelier, and a pair of flanking vestibules with small storefronts. Another nearly-identical but smaller vestibule on the southern end, near 45th Street, leads to the western walkway.

The lobby contains bronze chandeliers and an elaborate cornice with brackets and friezes. There are thirty-two elevators, grouped in eight banks of four, labeled "A" through "H". The elevator banks are double-height arched vestibules, with marble frames around the elevator openings, as well as bronze-ornamented elevator indicators. The elevators contain elaborately decorated bronze doors painted "Chinese red", with the railroad's initials. The bronze reliefs above the elevator doors contain winged helmets flanking a globe, a symbol of global influence. The elevator cab interiors contain Chinese red walls with wood moldings, as well as ceilings with gift domes and painted cloudscapes. The elevator banks and cabs are similar, with minor variations.

== History ==
In the 19th century, the New York Central Railroad lines north of Grand Central Depot in Midtown Manhattan were served exclusively by steam locomotives, and the rising traffic soon caused accumulations of smoke and soot in the Park Avenue Tunnel, the only approach to the depot. After a fatal crash in 1902, the New York state legislature passed a law to ban all steam trains in Manhattan by 1908. New York Central's vice president William J. Wilgus proposed electrifying the line and building a new electric-train terminal underground, a plan that was implemented almost in its entirety. The old Grand Central Depot was torn down in phases and replaced by the current Grand Central Terminal. Construction on Grand Central Terminal started on June 19, 1903, and the new terminal was opened on February 2, 1913.

Passenger traffic on the commuter lines into Grand Central more than doubled in the years following the terminal's completion. The terminal spurred development in the surrounding area, particularly in Terminal City, a commercial and office district created above where the tracks were covered. Terminal City soon became Manhattan's most desirable commercial and office district. A 1920 New York Times article said, "With its hotels, office buildings, apartments and underground Streets it not only is a wonderful railroad terminal, but also a great civic centre." Most of these buildings were designed by Warren & Wetmore, which had also designed the terminal itself.

=== Planning and construction ===
==== Early plans ====
Following Grand Central Terminal's completion, one of the first plans for development on the Helmsley Building's current site took place in 1914, when the Winter Sports Club secured an option from New York Central to build property on the east side of Park Avenue between 45th and 46th Streets. The development of Terminal City had included the construction of the Park Avenue Viaduct, surrounding Grand Central Terminal. The first part of the viaduct had opened in 1919, carrying traffic from Park Avenue and 40th Street to Vanderbilt Avenue and 45th Street. Initially, only the western leg of the present-day viaduct was open to traffic, and there was a severe bottleneck at Vanderbilt Avenue and 45th Street. As such, the city government refused to issue construction permits for buildings on Park Avenue between 45th and 46th Streets until the bottleneck was resolved. The city started negotiating with New York Central to open the eastern leg of the viaduct, although the railroad was holding out unless it was granted property on Park Avenue. At the time, New York Central had planned to build two buildings, one on either side of Park Avenue.

New York Central proposed a single 16-story building over Park Avenue in 1922. Two years later, New York Central and the city reached an agreement to build a single building over Park Avenue, in exchange for an extension of Vanderbilt Avenue from 45th to 47th Streets, and the completion of the viaduct through the new building over Park Avenue. The project to complete the Park Avenue Viaduct proceeded after the proposal was certified by Charles L. Craig, the city controller, in 1925. The final plan for the New York Central Building above Park Avenue was not completed until February 1927. As part of the plan, the viaduct's roadways would cross over 45th Street without intersection, descending to ground level within the building. The plan also included provisions for the extension of Park Avenue's sidewalks from 46th to 45th Streets through the building.

==== Construction ====
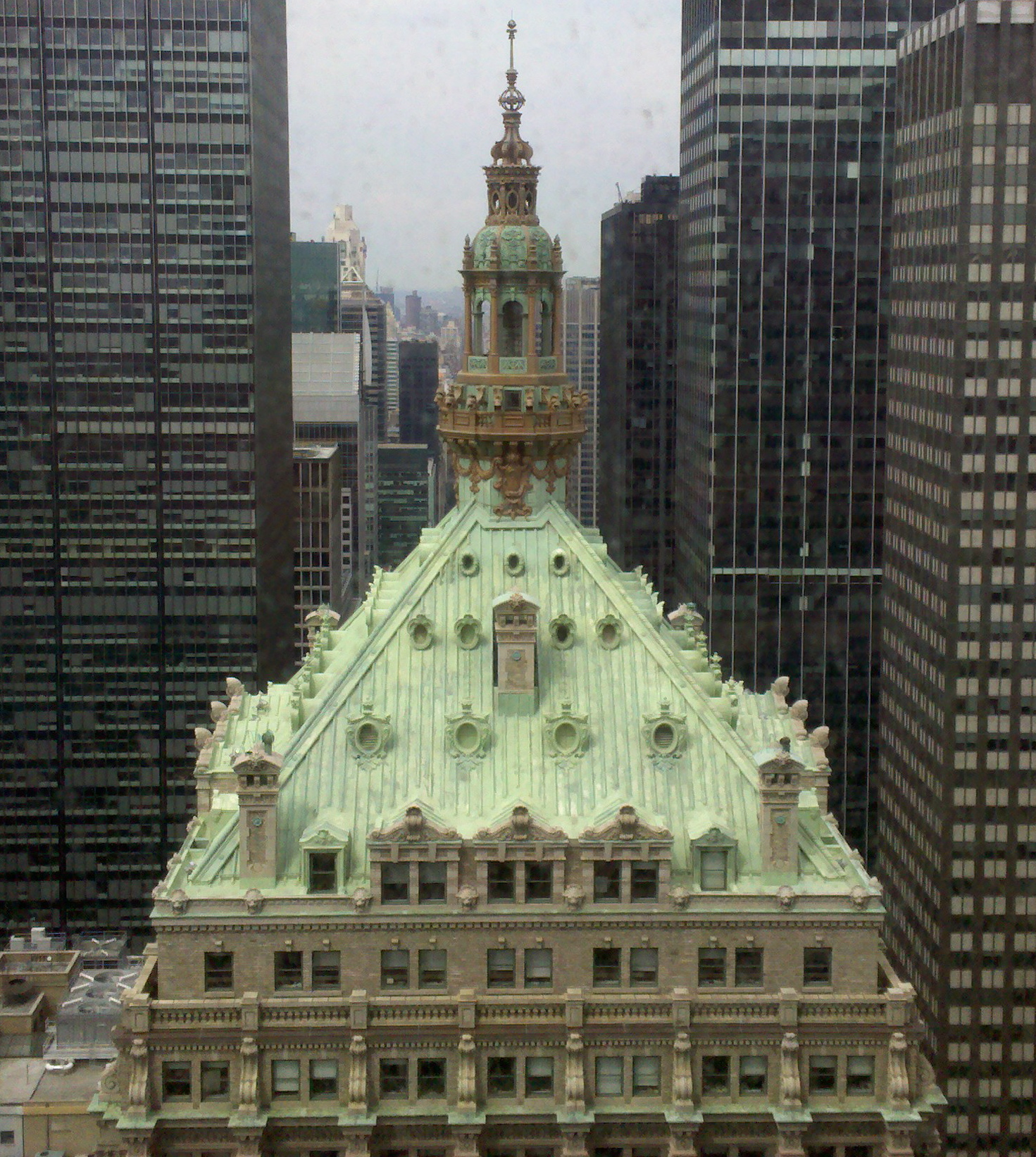
Roof, seen from the south

New York Central was responsible for all of the component projects of construction, including the viaduct ramps and the pedestrian walkways, while the city government provided support. The collaboration was described by The New York Times as "a fine example of the way in which private undertakings, when intelligently coordinated with municipal interests, can bring about a real public improvement".

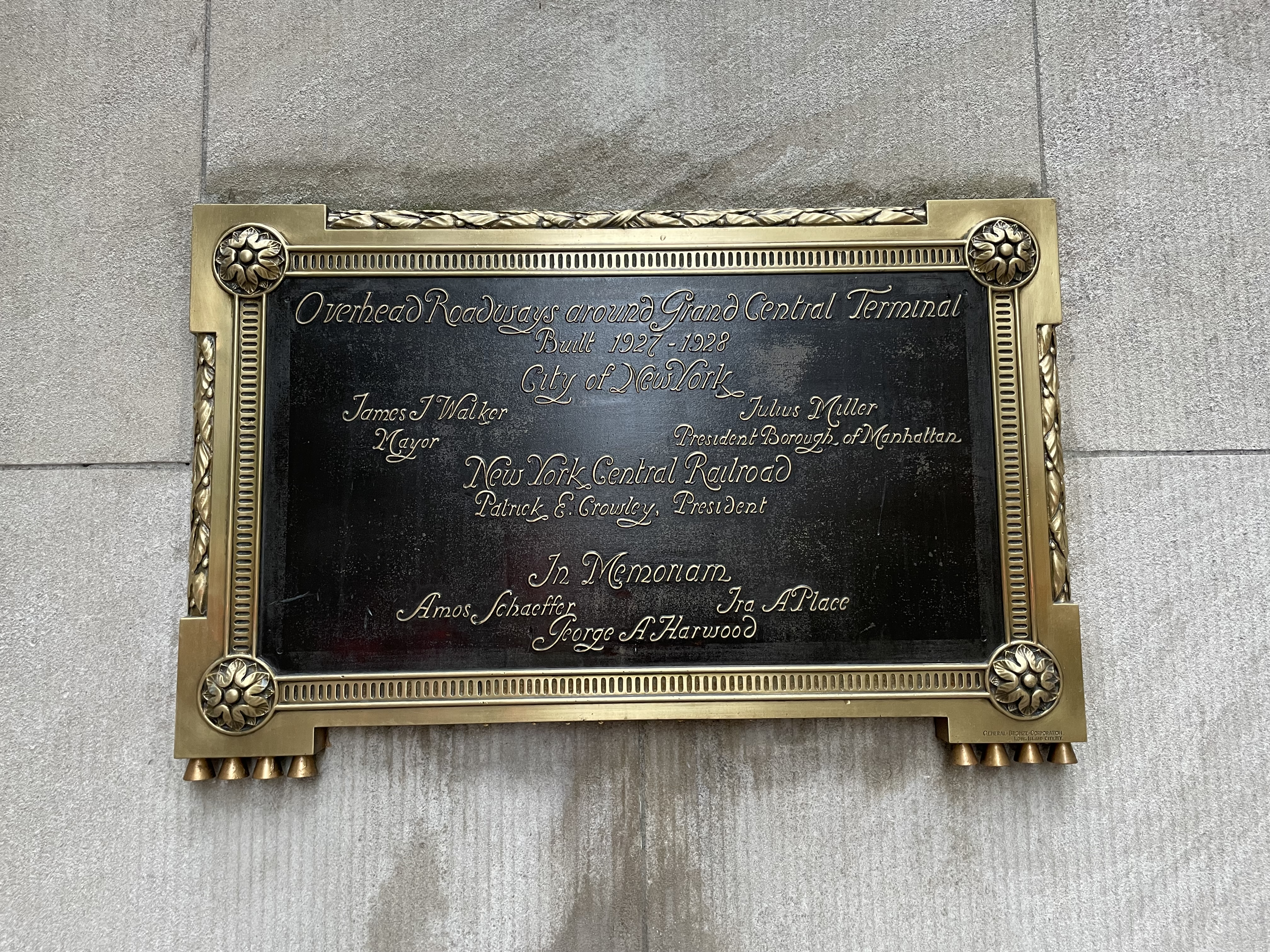
Plaque commemorating completion of overhead roadways

Construction of the foundation started in December 1926. At that time, New York Central opened bids for the procurement of 40,000 short tons (36,000 long tons; 36,000 t) of steel. Warren and Wetmore filed building plans in February 1927, and a contract for 25,000 short tons (22,000 long tons; 23,000 t) of steel was awarded to the McClintic-Marshall Company the next month. James Stewart & Company were hired to place the foundation's piers 50 feet (15 m) deep. That July, New York Central awarded the general construction contract to James Stewart & Company. Because the steel beams were so large, they could not be moved through city Streets, so they were delivered by rail. The steelwork had reached the ground level by November 1927. The building topped out on April 5, 1928, though Chauncey Depew, the chairman of the railroad's board of directors, had died several hours before the topping-out ceremony.

=== New York Central use ===
The New York Central Building received a temporary occupancy certificate in December 1928, and its roof was first lit in January 1929. However, the building was not considered completed until September 25, 1929, when all construction was finished. According to later sources, the building was considered to be the last major project erected as part of Terminal City. New York Central moved its administrative headquarters to the 32nd and 33rd floors, while the remaining floors were leased to tenants. The 32nd floor had a boardroom with English wood paneling gifted by the Van Swearingen brothers (who were railroad barons), as well as the president's and chairman's suites.

The Railway Express Agency moved all its departments into one floor of the New York Central Building in April 1930. There were other railroad-related tenants such as equipment manufacturer Symington Company, as well as the American Brake Shoe and Foundry Company, and the Delaware and Hudson Railway. In the first decades of the building's history, its other tenants included publisher McCall Company, paper manufacturer Eastern Manufacturing Company, and Colonial Airlines. Salvatore Maranzano, a boss for the American Mafia, had an office on the ninth floor, where he worked for the Eagle Building Corporation. On September 10, 1931, he was killed by hitmen sent by Lucky Luciano and Vito Genovese, ambitious underlings whom Maranzano had hired Vincent "Mad Dog" Coll to kill.

The New York Central Building's windows were blacked out as a safety measure during World War II. During the 1950s, New York Central undertook a multi-million-dollar restoration of the building, and in 1958, put the building up for lease. That year, Irving Brodsky of the New York Bank for Savings assumed a 50-year leasehold and renamed it the New York General Building. Upon the New York Central's Building's renaming, the letters "C" and "T" on the facade's plaque (which originally read "New York Central Building") were chiseled into "G" and "E", respectively. The renaming is sometimes credited to Harry Helmsley, a later owner of the building; he said that the change had been made for cost-saving reasons.

=== Subsequent use ===
==== Helmsley ownership ====
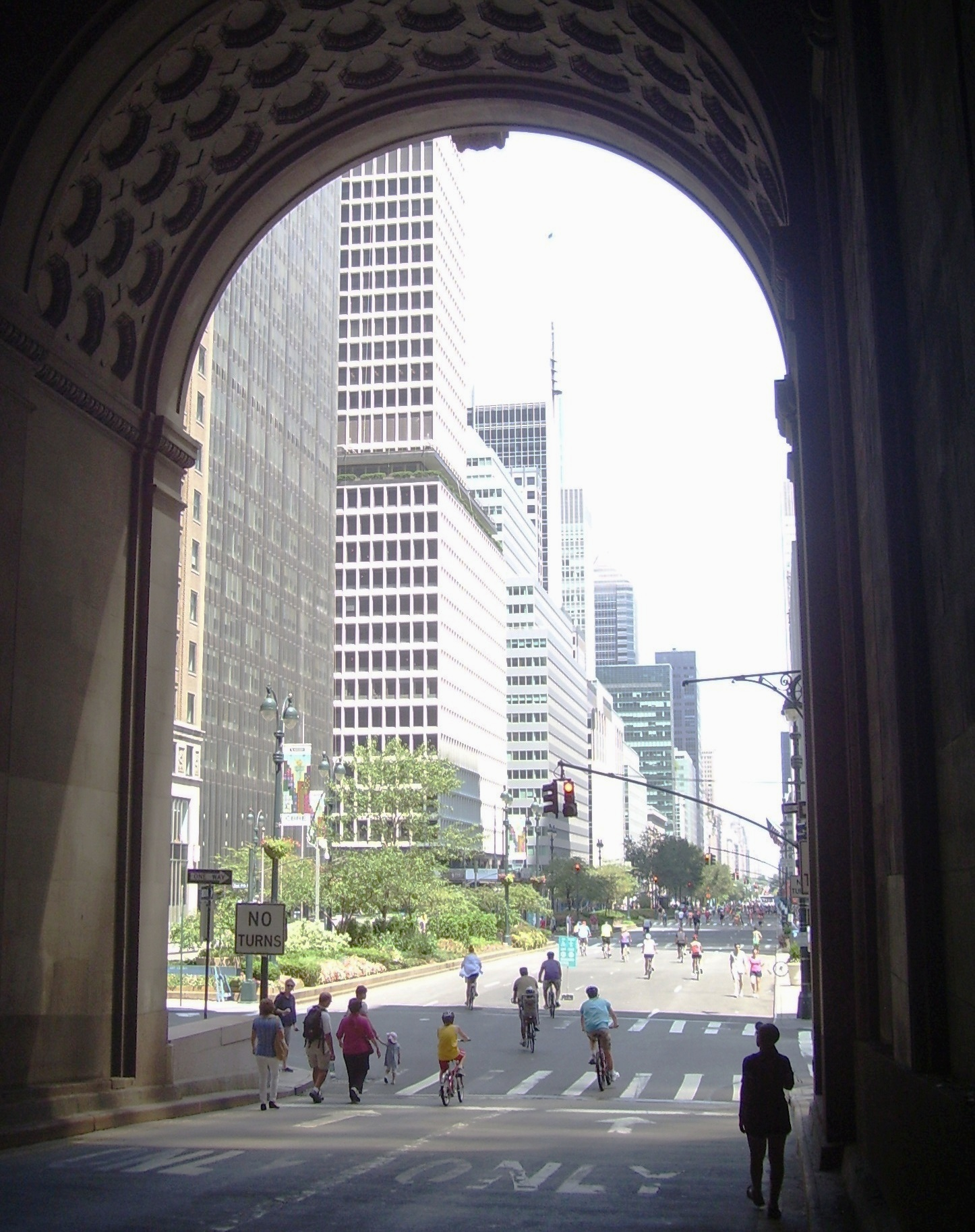
Uptown traffic exits the Park Avenue Viaduct through the eastern portal of the Helmsley Building.

New York Central had merged with the Pennsylvania Railroad in 1968 to form the Penn Central Railroad. (Note: Penn Central became part of Conrail in 1976, which was divided by Norfolk Southern and CSX in the late 1990s.) That same year, the New York Central Building was sold to the General Tire & Rubber Company. After Penn Central went bankrupt in 1970, it sought to sell its properties. By the next year, Penn Central trustees had signed contracts to sell the New York General Building. The proceedings were delayed for several years, as federal judge John P. Fullam refused to approve the sale of the New York General Building, while approving four of Penn Central's other sales. In December 1975, the trustees petitioned Fullam to sell the building to the New York Bank for Savings for $7 million in cash and $19 million in a 33.5-year mortgage. The sale was finalized early the next year. The major ownership stake was sold to Harry Helmsley's company Helmsley-Spear Management in 1977.

After Helmsley's purchase, both the exterior and interior of the New York General Building were restored. The verdigris copper roof, which suffered from leaks, was waterproofed and gilded. The facade was also extensively cleaned. The clock and other ornaments on the facade were also gilded, floodlights were activated at the top and bottom, and the letters "Helmsley Building" were installed on the facade. The building became known as the Helmsley Building in December 1978, following the refurbishment project's completion. According to Harry Helmsley, the renaming was suggested by his wife Leona. Despite the name, the Helmsleys were only one of several stakeholders in 230 Park Avenue Associates, which owned the building.

The New York City Landmarks Preservation Commission designated the Helmsley Building and its first-floor interior as official city landmarks in 1987. The first-floor interior designation included the lobby, seven of the eight elevator banks, and the entrance vestibules. The New York Times reported in 2011 that the building's interior landmark designation was difficult to maintain. The lobbies had to be cleaned every month, and restoration of the building's landmarked elevators required an artist to repaint the elevators' ceiling frescoes by hand.

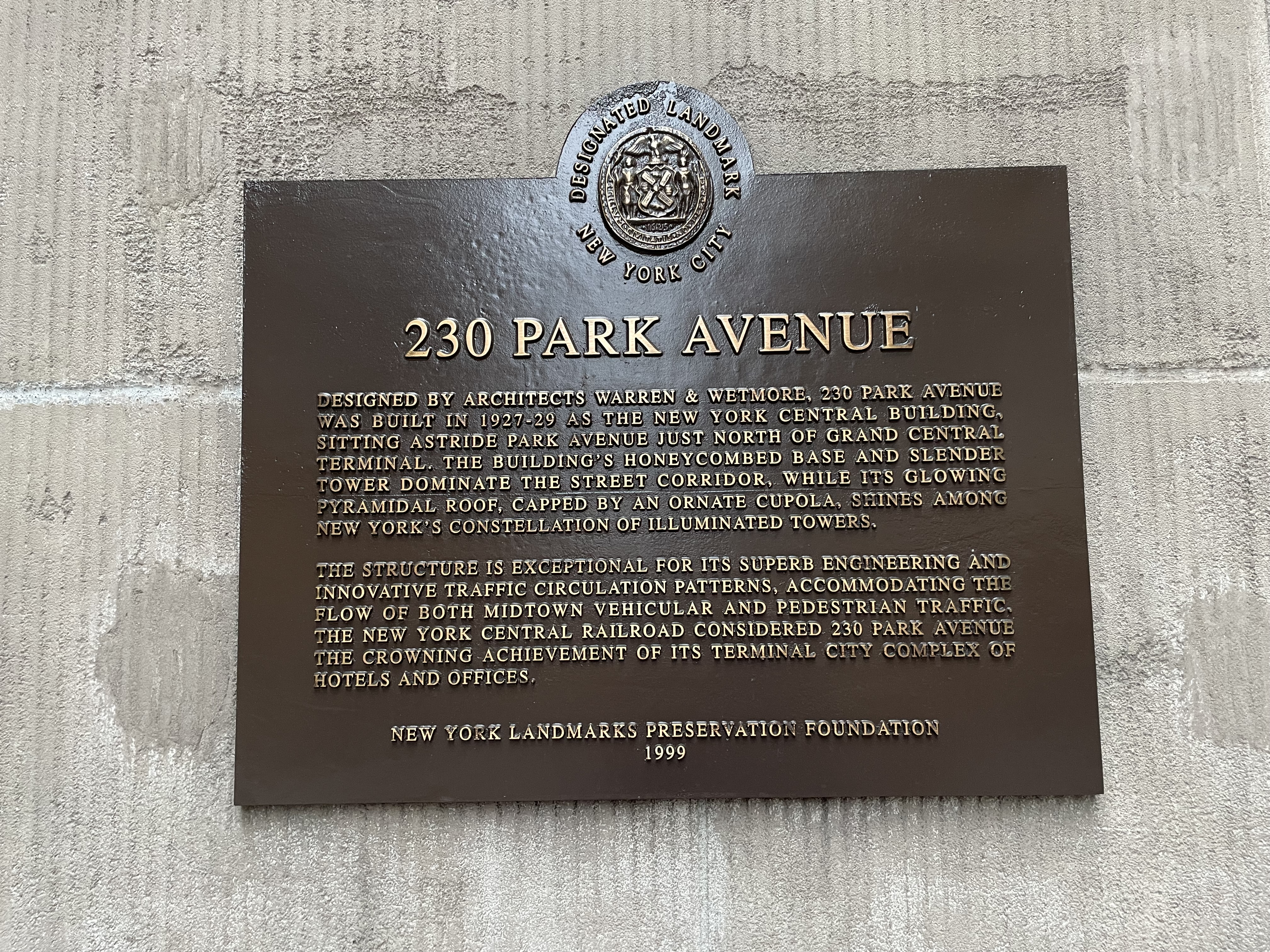
Landmark Plaque placed in 1999

A connection from the Grand Central North passageways to the building's pedestrian arcades was announced in 1994 and opened in 1999. After Harry Helmsley died in early 1996, Leona Helmsley maintained her offices in the Helmsley Building, and transferred the building's management to the Helmsley-Noyes Company.

==== Late 1990s to early 2010s ====
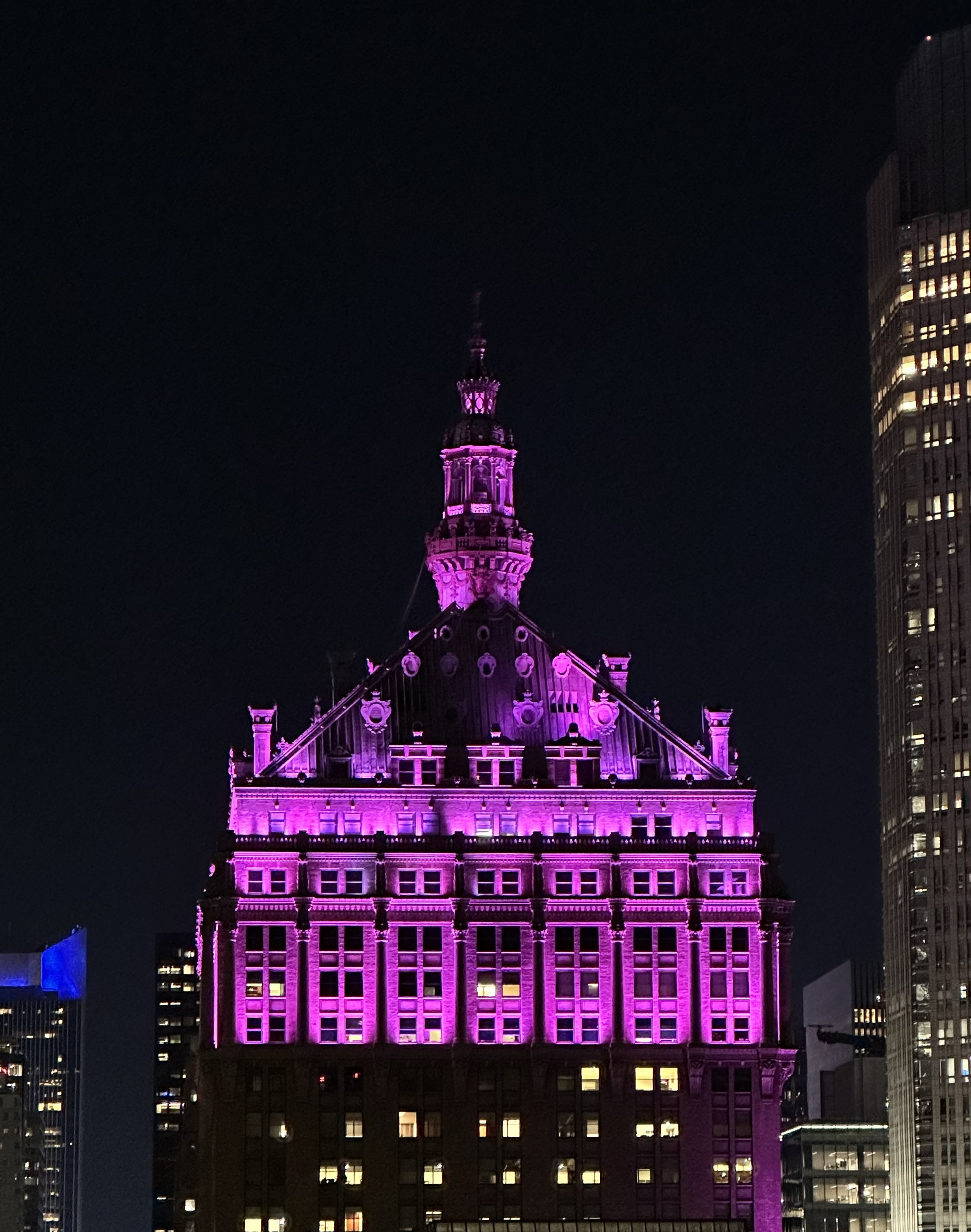
The Helmsley Building at night, October 2024

The Helmsley Building was owned by Helmsley-Spear until August 1998, when it was sold to the Max Capital Management Corporation for $225 million. The terms of the sale stipulated that the building would not be renamed again. Max Capital subsequently hired Skidmore, Owings & Merrill to design the building's $50 million renovation. Starting in 2000, the building's arcades were shut down one at a time for renovation. The advertising boards in the arcades were removed, and the mezzanine floors in the arcades were demolished to double the ceiling height. Light shafts, TV screens, and bronze storefronts were installed as well. The gilding was removed during the renovation as well. In 2002, the owners stopped lighting certain rooms inside the Helmsley Building during nights in December. When the room-lighting had occurred in previous years, the rooms would be lit so the pattern on the facade resembled a cross; it was controversial among Jewish residents of Park Avenue, but according to Max Capital, the lighting pattern was stopped for security reasons.

In 2005, the Helmsley Building was sold again to Istithmar, an investment firm owned by the royal family of Dubai, for $705 million. Two years later, it was sold to Goldman Sachs in 2007 for over $1 billion. Following a 2010 renovation, the Helmsley Building became the first building erected prior to World War II to receive a Leadership in Energy and Environmental Design certification for green buildings. Monday Properties and Invesco paid $740 million for the building in 2011.

==== RXR ownership ====
The Helmsley Building was sold once again in May 2015 to property firm RXR Realty for $1.2 billion. RXR spent $190 million renovating the facade and bathrooms. Many tenants left during the COVID-19 pandemic in New York City, and 20 percent of the space was vacant by 2021. A special servicer took over a $670 million commercial mortgage-backed security loan on the building in November 2023, prompting concerns that the building's owners could default on the loan. RXR considered converting the Helmsley Building to residential apartments in mid-2024 after defaulting on the loan. Despite its central location, the Helmsley Building was only 70% occupied at the time, and office space there cost as little as $50 per square foot ($540/m^{2}), half the rate at similar buildings nearby. Furthermore, over half the building's rental income came from tenants whose leases expired by 2026.

The real-estate management firm SL Green was named as the building's special servicer in September 2024. By that November, the building was appraised at $770 million, a 40% decrease from its $1.3 billion valuation in 2021. RXR's lenders moved to foreclose on the building the next month, citing the fact that RXR had defaulted on the loan, though RXR's CEO Scott Rechler still wanted to convert the building to apartments. In response, RXR claimed in early 2025 that their lenders did not have sufficient authority to initiate foreclosure proceedings. although a state judge rejected RXR's argument. The foreclosure proceedings caused the vacancy rate to increase from 20% in December 2024 to 44% by mid-2025. In 2026, RXR placed the Helmsley Building on sale with an asking price of $670 million.

== Tenants ==
As of 2020, tenants at the Helmsley Building include 5W Public Relations (5WPR), Cornell University, Comerica Bank, Elsevier, Encyclopædia Britannica, HSH Nordbank AG, LexisNexis, the New York Court of Appeals, Novartis, Powermat, Simon Property Group, Six Flags, Stanley Hand Tools, Tokio Marine Management, and Voya Financial. In addition, a food hall called Urbanspace opened in 12,000 square feet (1,100 m^{2}) within the Helmsley Building in 2014; this food market had been renamed Vanderbilt Market by 2025, two years after food-service operator Hospitality Firm took over Urbanspace's properties.

Its tenants have been cited as a notable example of the decreased tax burden on the wealthy. Internal Revenue Service ZIP Code records in 2007 revealed that while the average tax filer in the Helmsley Building had an adjusted gross income (AGI) of $1.2 million, they paid only a 14.7% effective tax rate. Meanwhile, an average New York City janitor had an AGI of $33,000 and paid an effective tax rate of 24.9%.

== Reception ==
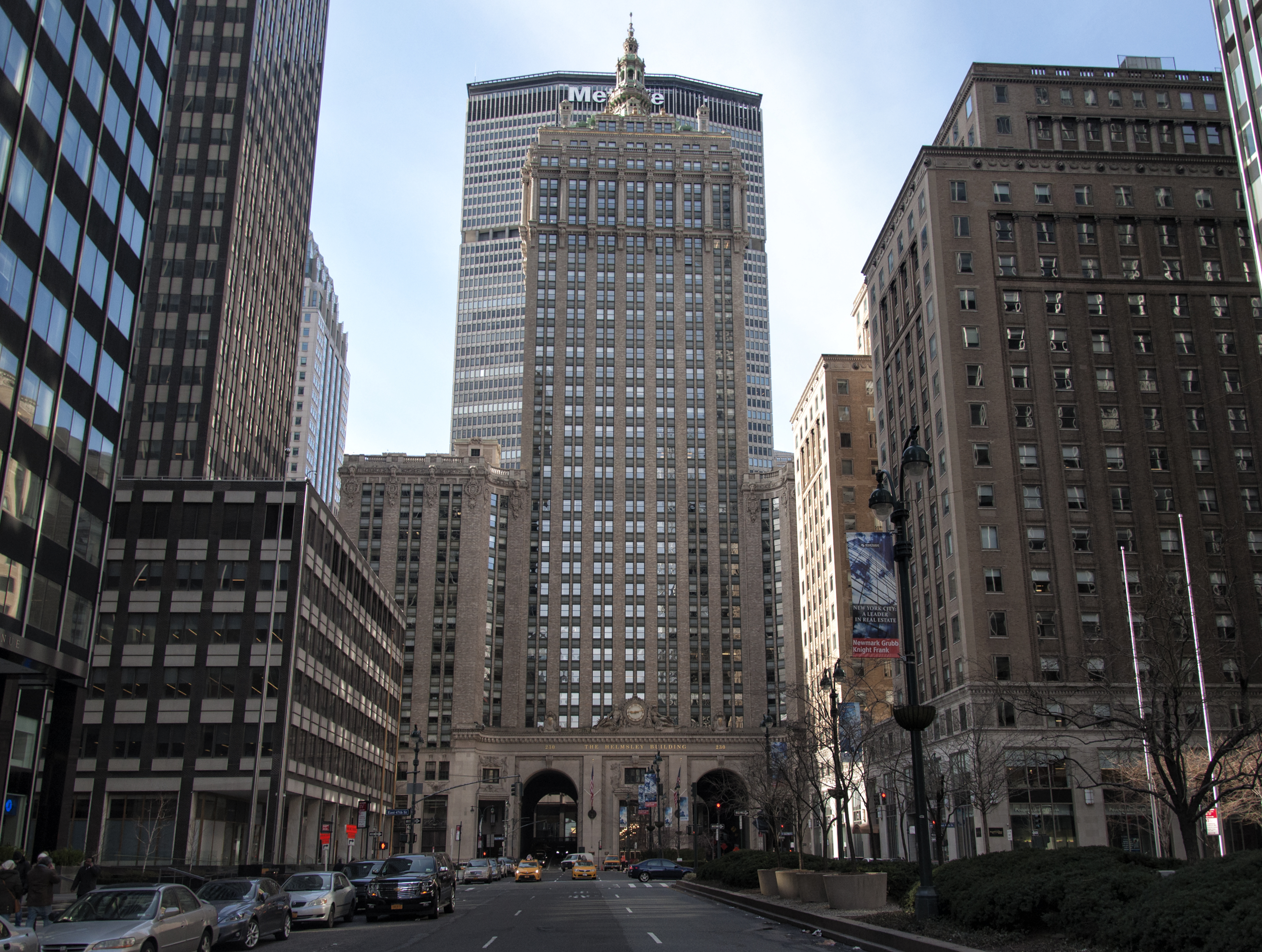
Viewed from two blocks north

Early critics had mixed reviews of the building. George Shepard Chappell, writing for The New Yorker in 1928 and 1929, called it "a dramatic stop sign at the end of the thoroughfare", and described the lobby's styles as ranging "from Pullman to Paramount". Harry F. Cunningham reviewed the building much more harshly in a 1928 issue of The American Yearbook, calling the building "one of the greatest steps in the present backward tendency shown in American architecture" for its rejection of modernist styles In a book published in 1932, W. Parker Chase called the Helmsley Building "the most remarkable office building in the world", saying that the construction of the George Washington Bridge—then the world's longest suspension bridge—was about as complex as the Helmsley Building's construction.

Later reviews were more positive. Nathan Silver wrote in his 1967 book Lost New York: "With its outline and decoration, [the Helmsley Building] was able to indicate clearly its relationship to the height of a man." John Tauranac, in a guidebook published in 1978, said that the design was "absolutely glorious". Paul Goldberger of The New York Times wrote in 1978 that the Helmsley Building "picks up on the architectural elements of Park Avenue, but transforms them into something more exuberant". Christopher Gray, writing for the same newspaper, stated in 1996: "The middle section is handsome, but the top explodes like a Caribbean coral formation." A partner at Kohn Pederson Fox said in 1984 that the gilding of the Helmsley Building "is rather excessive, and not architecturally appropriate". The author Dirk Stichweh said the Helmsley Building remained "a striking landmark on the New York skyline".

The building's clock also received critical attention. Architecture critic Royal Cortissoz called the clock "one of the most conspicuous sculptural decorations ever erected in the city". The New York Daily News editorial team expressed disappointment that the clock was not more prominent and that there was no clock tower.

== See also ==
- List of New York City Designated Landmarks in Manhattan from 14th to 59th Streets
