= Starrett–Lehigh Building =

Commercial building in Manhattan, New York

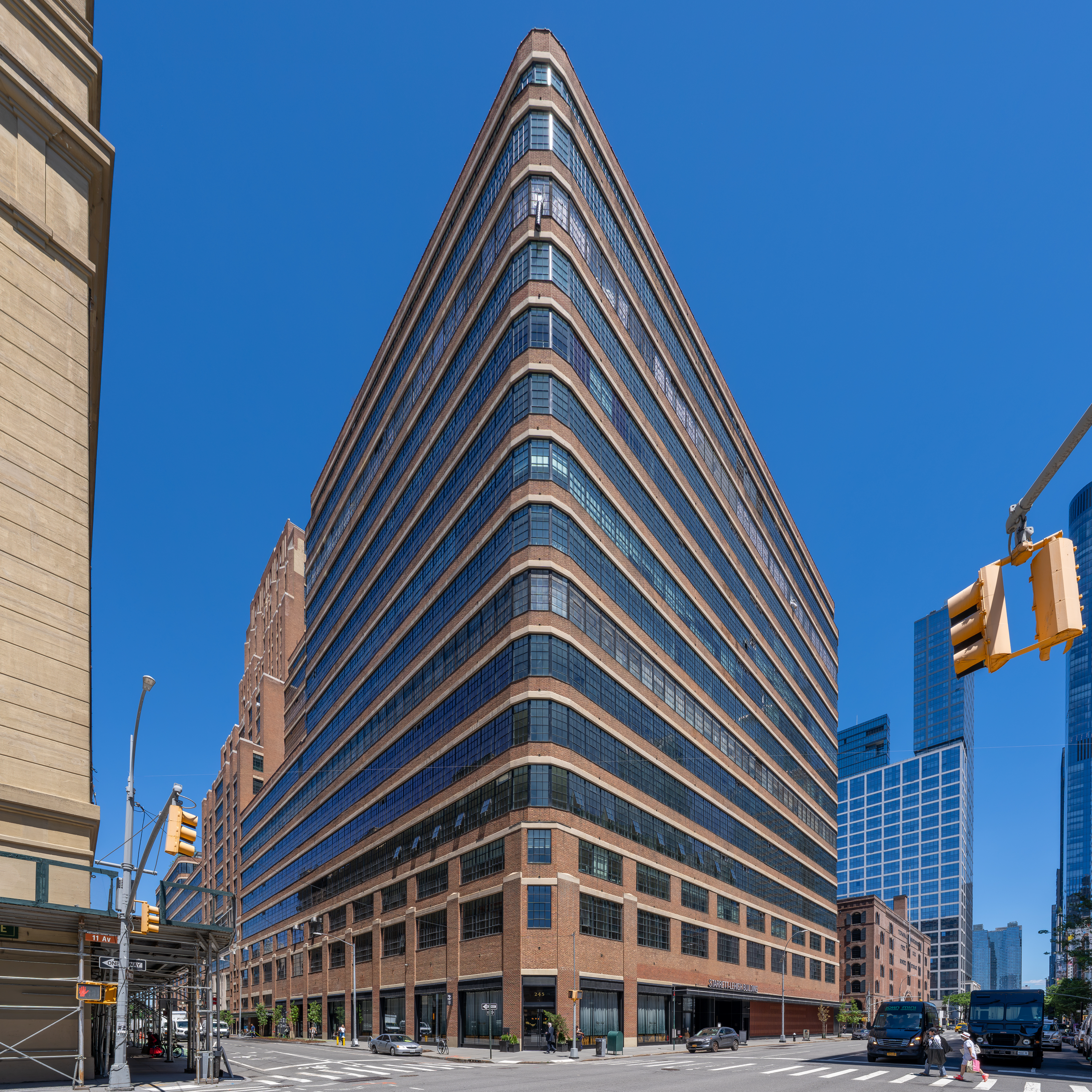
- Starrett–Lehigh Building as seen from 11th Avenue (2026)

General information
- Architectural style: International Style/Art Deco
- Location: 601 West 26th Street; Manhattan, New York; United States
- Coordinates: 40°45′06″N 74°00′24″W
- Construction started: 1930
- Completed: 1931
- Renovated: 1998
- Cost: $6–9 million (est.)
- Owner: RXR Realty

Height
- Height: 296 feet (90 m)

Technical details
- Floor count: 19
- Floor area: 2,300,000 square feet (210,000 m^{2})

Design and construction
- Architects: Cory and Cory
- Developer: Starrett Corporation

Website
- starrett-lehigh.com

New York City Landmark
- Designated: October 7, 1986
- Reference no.: 1295

The Starrett–Lehigh Building is a 19-story building at 601 West 26th Street, occupying the full block between Eleventh Avenue, 26th Street, Twelfth Avenue, and 27th Street, in the Chelsea neighborhood of Manhattan in New York City. It was built between 1930 and 1931 by the Starrett Corporation and the Lehigh Valley Railroad (LV), who formed a joint venture to develop a freight terminal and warehouse to replace the railroad's previous freight terminal. The structure was designed by the firm of Cory & Cory, with Yasuo Matsui as the associate architect and the firm of Purdy & Henderson as the consulting structural engineers. The Starrett–Lehigh Building has largely been used as an office building since the late 1990s.

Much of the Starrett–Lehigh Building is 18 stories tall; the central portion is 19 stories tall, while the westernmost portion is nine stories tall due to the site's geology. The building's facade has alternating bands of steel strip windows, brickwork, polygonal corners, and large setbacks. The interior has large concrete floor plates, with a total volume of 26 million cubic feet (740,000 m^{3}) and a rentable floor area of 1.8 million square feet (170,000 m^{2}). There was a rail yard and driveways at ground level, as well as three freight elevators that carried trucks to delivery bays on the upper levels. Widely acclaimed on its completion, the Starrett–Lehigh Building was displayed at the Museum of Modern Art's 1932 "Modern Architecture: International Exhibition", and its design was imitated by other structures. Although the exterior remains intact, the railroad tracks have been removed, and many of the old freight-delivery areas have been converted into amenity areas such as a billiard room, indoor golf machines, and a shuffleboard court.

A freight terminal on the site was announced in 1928, and the LV acquired the lots in early 1930; the Starrett Corporation leased the site's air rights later that year. The building was completed in December 1931 and sold to the LV the next year following the death of William A. Starrett, head of the Starrett Corporation. The LV sold the building to Jacob Friedus in 1944, and the rail lines were removed in the mid-20th century. Occupancy peaked in the 1940s and early 1950s, when 5,000 people worked at the Starrett–Lehigh Building, but the structure was 40 percent vacant by the early 1970s. Harry Helmsley acquired the building at an auction in 1974 and owned it until his death in 1997. A syndicate of investors bought the Starrett–Lehigh Building in 1998 and renovated it, attracting dot-com companies and later fashion firms. The structure was sold again in 2011 to RXR Realty, which conducted further renovations in the late 2010s and early 2020s.

== Site ==
The Starrett–Lehigh Building is at 601-625 West 26th Street in the Chelsea neighborhood of Manhattan in New York City. It occupies a full city block bounded by Eleventh Avenue to the east, 26th Street to the south, Twelfth Avenue to the west, and 27th Street to the north. The trapezoidal site covers 124,100 square feet (11,530 m^{2}) and measures approximately 652.25 feet (199 m) long to the north, 197.5 feet (60 m) long to the east, 607 feet (185 m) long to the south, and 202.65 feet (62 m) long to the west. The building was developed by the Starrett Corporation and the Lehigh Valley Railroad (LV), on the site of a former freight terminal for the latter.

The building stands on filled land along the eastern shore of the North River (the southernmost portion of the Hudson River). Until the early 19th century, the shoreline had been located just west of modern-day Tenth Avenue, further east. The neighborhood was expanded west to Eleventh Avenue in the 1850s through land reclamation, but it took several more decades to expand the land area further westward to Twelfth Avenue. The land lots on the city block were first platted in 1858, when records indicate that Isaac E. Smith and Ichabod T. Williams operated lumber yards on the site. The LV leased all of the land lots on the block in 1900 and opened a carload freight terminal on the site around 1905. Cars from the LV's rail yard in Jersey City, New Jersey, on the opposite shore of the Hudson River, were transported to the terminal in Manhattan using car floats.

== Architecture ==
The Starrett–Lehigh Building was designed by brothers Walter and Russell Cory. Yasuo Matsui was the associate architect, and the firm of Purdy & Henderson were the consulting structural engineers. The building features large setbacks, polygonal corners, and alternating bands of steel strip windows, brickwork, and concrete floor plates. The design mixes elements of European modern architecture, which used horizontal lines for emphasis, and American industrial architecture, which was largely utilitarian. The design, unconventional for industrial buildings of its time, has also been characterized as expressionist.

=== Form ===
The Starrett–Lehigh Building consists of various sections that are up to 19 stories high, excluding a mezzanine above the first story. The Skyscraper Center and Emporis give the building's height as 296 feet (90 m), although another source published shortly after the building's completion cited the building as 263 feet (80 m) tall. The building had been planned as a 15-story structure, with each story covering the entire site. During construction, the geology of the site forced a change to the current layout of a 19-story section in the middle, flanked by a 9-story wing to the west and an 18-story wing to the east.

The lowest seven stories fill the entire block. The 8th and 9th stories are shaped like double "H"s, with two setbacks on the facade's north and south elevations. These setbacks divide the building into five sections from west to east; the first, third, and fifth sections from the west (respectively the westernmost, central, and easternmost pavilions) protrude outward, while the other two sections are recessed. Each section of the building contains multiple setbacks, except for the first section, which is nine stories high and has no setbacks. The third section, known as the "central utilities section", is 19 stories high with two mechanical floors; the southern elevation has setbacks on the 10th, 13th, and 16th floors, while the northern elevation features a setback only on the 10th floor. The second, fourth, and fifth sections are 18 stories high, and the northern and southern elevations have setbacks at the 13th and 14th stories. The eastern elevation of the fifth section is also set back above the 14th story.

There are polygonal corners along most of the facade, which form S-curves where the projecting and recessed sections meet, except for parts of the central section. (Note: The southern elevation of the center pavilion, and the top three stories of that pavilion's northern elevation, have flat corners.) There is also a roof terrace at the 10th story, above the first section, which covers 10,000 ft^{2} (930 m^{2}) and functions as a tenant lounge. There is also a roof garden on the terrace. As of 2022, the roof terrace was planned to be redesigned with landscaping, seating areas, a pergola, a fountain, an art garden, and glass parapets.

=== Facade ===
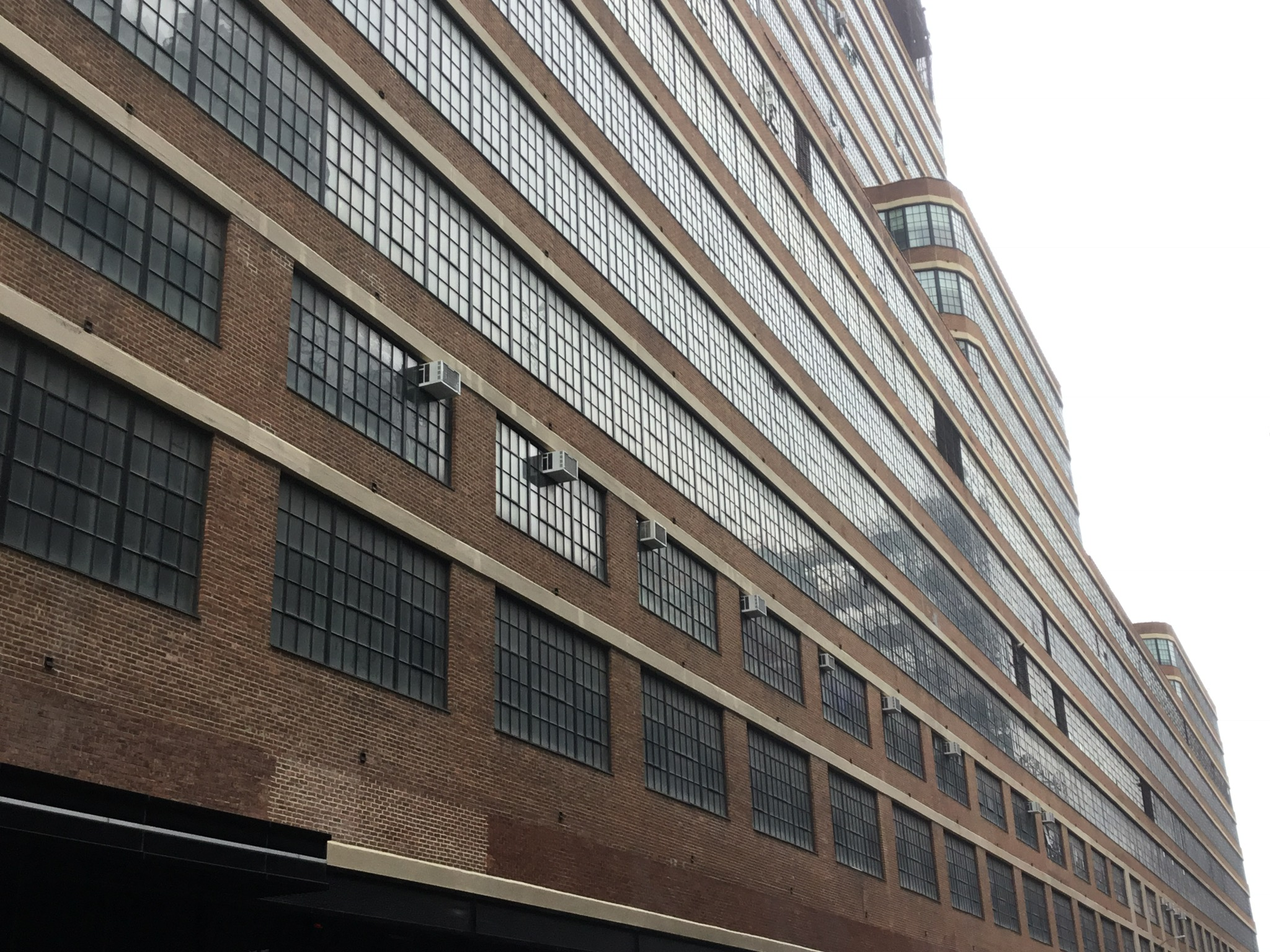
The facade as seen from ground level

The western and eastern elevations of the facade are each divided vertically into nine bays. On the southern elevation, the facade is divided into 12 bays to the west of the central section and 11 bays to the east of that section. The central utilities section itself is six bays wide. On the northern elevation, the facade is divided into 12 bays on either side of the central utilities section, which is also six bays wide.

The interior of the western part of the ground story is partially visible from the street. There is a mezzanine above part of the ground level on the southern elevation, as well as above the entirety of the northern elevation. Generally, the bays of the first story, mezzanine, and second story are divided by vertical brick piers with stone bases. At ground level, each bay has either a loading dock, a roll-down gate, cinderblock or brick walls, storefronts, louvers, or vehicular openings. On the mezzanine and second story, the piers separate windows in each bay. The main entrance is on 26th Street, at the center of the central utilities section. At ground level, there are vehicular ramps on the western and eastern elevations; some of the ground-level openings on the western elevation have been walled up, and the eastern elevation also contains storefronts. On both the western and eastern elevations, there are sash windows on the mezzanine and second story.

On all elevations above the second floor, the facade is generally oriented horizontally, with windows stretching across much of the facade. Brick spandrel panels separate windows on different stories. The windows were unusually large compared to other industrial buildings at the time of the building's completion. The floor slabs were cantilevered from behind the facade, which increased the risk that the windows could break if heavy loads caused the floor slabs to move. As a result, the builders installed custom windows that could expand and contract slightly whenever the floor slabs moved. The building originally had 110,000 glass panes, most of which were part of multi-paned sash windows. Many of the original windows have been replaced by ventilation openings and louvers over the years.

In contrast to the rest of the facade, the southern elevation of the central utilities section generally contains vertical brick piers that extend the facade's height. The windows in these bays are smaller than in the rest of the facade, and there are horizontal band courses above the third floor. The top three stories of the central section's northern elevation also have vertical piers.

=== Features ===
The Starrett–Lehigh Building occupies an entire city block and was intended for the railroad industry. It has 26 million cubic feet (740,000 m^{3}) of space and 1.8 million square feet (170,000 m^{2}) of rentable floor area. Utilities were grouped in a mechanical core at the center of the building. This mechanical core was constructed of steel and was completed before the upper stories' concrete superstructure was finished.

==== Freight loading areas ====
As with the Terminal Warehouse Central Stores Building on the next block north, trains could be operated directly into the ground floor of the building. Car floats transported railroad cars across the Hudson River to Pier 66 on the Manhattan shoreline. The entire ground floor included rail sidings; loading and unloading facilities for trucks; warehouse areas for storage, repackaging, redistribution, and manufacturing facilities; and areas to display goods. The railroad tracks extended west–east across the ground floor, which also contained driveways and platforms. The New York Herald Tribune wrote in 1944 that the ground level "was virtually a railroad freight yard". The columns on the first two stories are spaced irregularly to coordinate with the railroad track arrangements and to allow delivery trucks to maneuver within the building more easily. I-beams measuring 7.5 feet (2.3 m) deep were installed to support the upper stories. As such, the second story only occupies part of its site. The railroad tracks were removed in the mid-20th century.

Trucks entered the building on 27th Street. They traveled under the railroad tracks and drove into a truck pit that could fit up to nine trucks, where a dispatcher directed drivers to a freight elevator. Originally, the building had three freight elevators, which transported the trucks to a higher floor for loading and unloading. This eliminated the need for truck drivers to idle at the curb and block traffic. The elevators themselves were known as "vertical streets", and the use of the elevators allowed the building to operate as if "every floor is a first floor". Trucks left the building from 26th Street, which eliminated the need to reverse out of the building. The large number of truck elevators and loading bays was unusual among freight terminals in New York City; according to The New York Times, such features required "large sites with favorable grade conditions". During the 2000s, two of the three truck elevators were replaced with passenger elevators, and 11 passenger elevators were added. Tenants such as Martha Stewart continued to use the remaining freight elevator.

==== Offices and amenities ====
The lowest floors covered 124,000 square feet (11,500 m^{2}) and measured as much as 652 feet (199 m) long. (Note: Other sources cite the building as containing 130,000 ft^{2} (12,000 m^{2}) or 150,000 ft^{2} (14,000 m^{2}) on each story.) The ceilings were 13 feet 4 inches (4.06 m) high, while the centers of each supporting column were spaced 20 to 21 feet (6.1 to 6.4 m) apart. The concrete floor slabs are supported by columns that are set back 8.75 feet (3 m) from the facade; this allowed the architects to place continuous horizontal strips of windows on the facade. Some of the building's larger tenants furnished their spaces with executive suites, decorated with materials such as wood paneling. By the late 20th and early 21st centuries, the building had attracted many office tenants, some of whom redesigned their spaces using replicas or recreations of the building's original materials.

When the building opened, it had a gas station and auto repair shop, a newsstand, a barbershop, a clinic, cafeterias, executive offices, and other amenities. William A. Starrett of Starrett Brothers believed that, by providing such amenities, the Starrett–Lehigh Building would be "the forerunner of what we confidently believe will be the metropolitan solution, not only in New York, but in other large cities." Around 2000, the lobby was redesigned, and Maria Hellerstein and Nikolai Katz created an etched glass wall for the lobby measuring 50 by 17 feet (15.2 by 5.2 m). A 1,800-square-foot (170 m^{2}) bicycle storage room was also created in the basement, with space for 150 bikes. By the early 2020s, some of the upper stories' truck bays had been repurposed with amenities such as a billiard room, indoor golf machines, and a shuffleboard court.

== History ==
The LV was one of several freight railroads that operated within the Port of New York and New Jersey; these railroads carried about two-thirds of the port's freight tonnage during the early 20th century. Nearly all of the freight railroads in the area terminated in New Jersey, on the western shore of the Hudson River, and barges were used to carry freight to Manhattan, on the eastern shore. Among these was the LV, which used car floats to transport freight from its terminal in New Jersey to a dock on 27th Street. By the early 20th century, the barges could not sufficiently handle the amount of freight traffic traveling between New York and New Jersey. Simultaneously, Manhattan had grown into what The New York Times described as a "great industrial centre".

To accommodate high freight and industrial demand, several railroads had built rail freight terminals on the Manhattan side of the Hudson River, and many freight terminals and warehouses were built in the western part of Chelsea by the late 19th century. The first of these was the Central Stores, constructed immediately to the north of the Starrett-Lehigh site in 1891. This was followed in 1900 by the LV's terminal between 26th and 27th Streets, as well as the Baltimore and Ohio Railroad's terminal immediately to the south, completed in the early 1910s. By the early 20th century, the West Side of Manhattan was heavily congested because of the tangle of street-level passenger and freight trains on the West Side Line, cargo unloading from the busy Hudson River piers, and the lack of suitable warehouse facilities. Freight operations on Manhattan's far west side were improved when the elevated West Side Freight Line and the West Side Elevated Highway were built in the 1930s, replacing a surface-level railroad and roadway.

=== Development ===
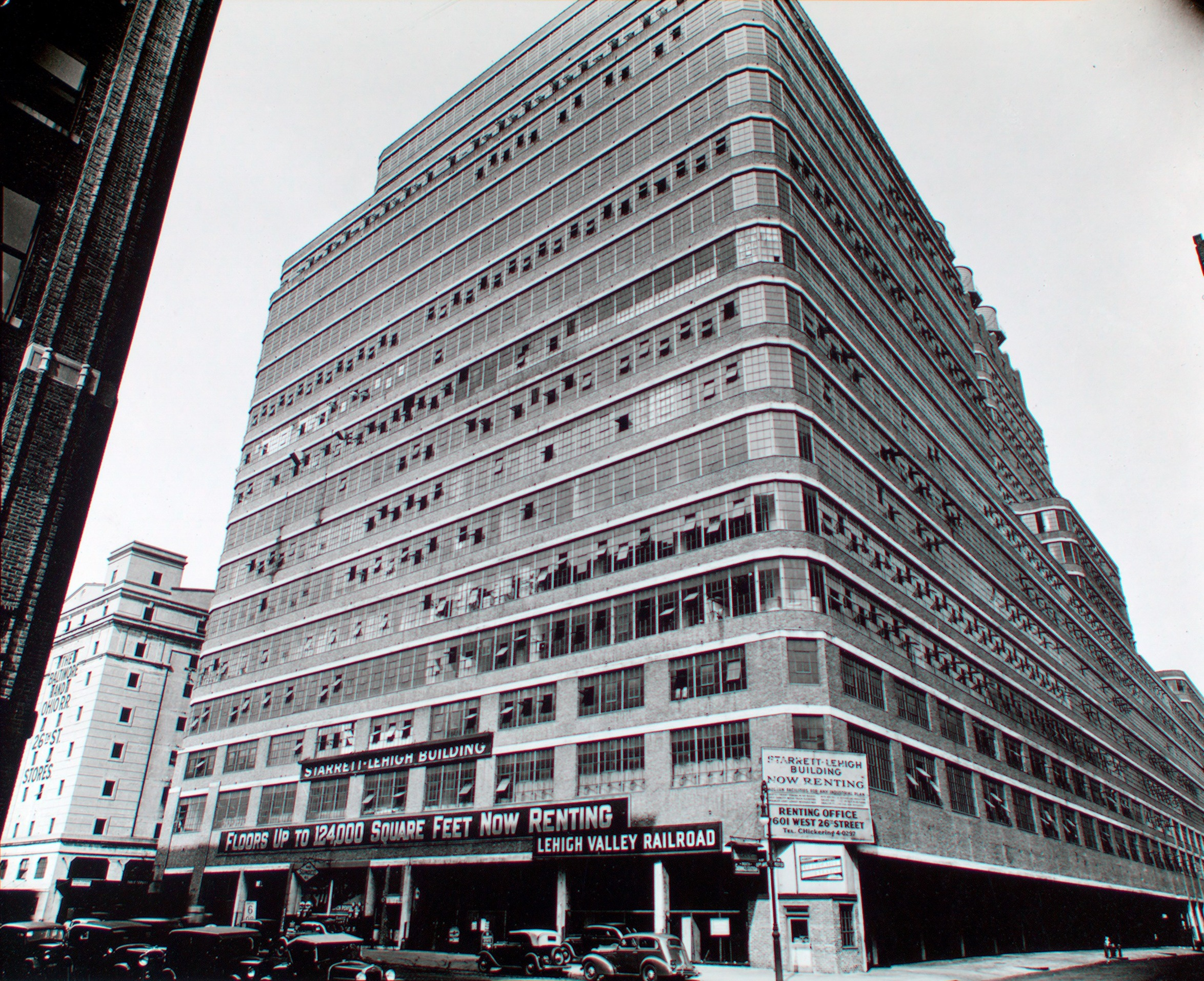
Picture of the building by Berenice Abbott, taken in 1936

Industrial engineer R. Wilbur Tietjen acquired the city block occupied by the LV's freight terminal in January 1928. He planned to build a 12-story warehouse on the 3-acre (1.2 ha) site, which measured 630 by 197 feet (192 by 60 m) across. The Thirteenth Avenue and West Twenty-sixth Street Corporation acquired the city block that April and hired the George A. Fuller Company as the main contractor. The LV announced in April 1929 that it would occupy the new warehouse, which would cost $10 million and was to be called the Lehigh Valley Terminal Warehouse. The railroad had already leased the ground floor of the facility, which was to include space for 54 railroad cars; 72 vehicular loading docks; and a driveway connecting Eleventh and Twelfth Avenues. The rest of the building would have 1,314,600 square feet (122,130 m^{2}) of office space. In addition to the Fuller Company, architecture firm Wescott & Mapes and construction engineer Alexander D. Stark would have been involved with the project.

The LV bought the site in March 1930. That June, construction company Starrett Brothers and Eken leased the air rights over the LV's ground-level freight yard from LV subsidiary Pioneer Real Estate Company for 99 years. Starrett Brothers planned to erect the Starrett–Lehigh Building, the world's largest integrated freight terminal–warehouse, on the site for $7 million. The 15-story building was to contain about 1,750,000 square feet (163,000 m^{2}; 40 acres; 16.3 ha) of space above the LV's existing tracks, as well as 10-by-30-foot (3.0 by 9.1 m) truck elevators serving each floor. Starrett Brothers would construct the building, while Russell G. Cory had been hired to design the edifice, which was to have a facade largely made of glass. The LV retained ownership of the ground level, and Gimbel Brothers had already agreed to lease 350,000 square feet (33,000 m^{2}) on the upper floors. The terminal was one of three major freight terminals being developed on the West Side during the early 1930s, along with the Port Authority Building and St. John's Terminal.

The LV submitted plans to the New York City Department of Buildings for an 18-story edifice in July 1930, at which point excavations at the site were underway. The Title Guarantee and Trust Company placed a $4.5 million, four-year loan on the Starrett–Lehigh Building in June 1931. Although a fire on the 18th floor at the end of that month caused an estimated $150,000 in damage, the building's steel frame was topped out on July 4, 1931. Colonel William A. Starrett, head of the Starrett Brothers, said at the time that the completion of the Starrett–Lehigh Building and other West Side freight terminals would reduce freight congestion and turn Manhattan's West Side into an industrial hub. The cost of construction increased unexpectedly due to the difficulties of erecting the foundation, which had forced the architects to modify their plans to an 18-story building. The final cost was estimated at between $6.37 million and $10 million.

=== Industrial use ===
==== Opening and early years ====
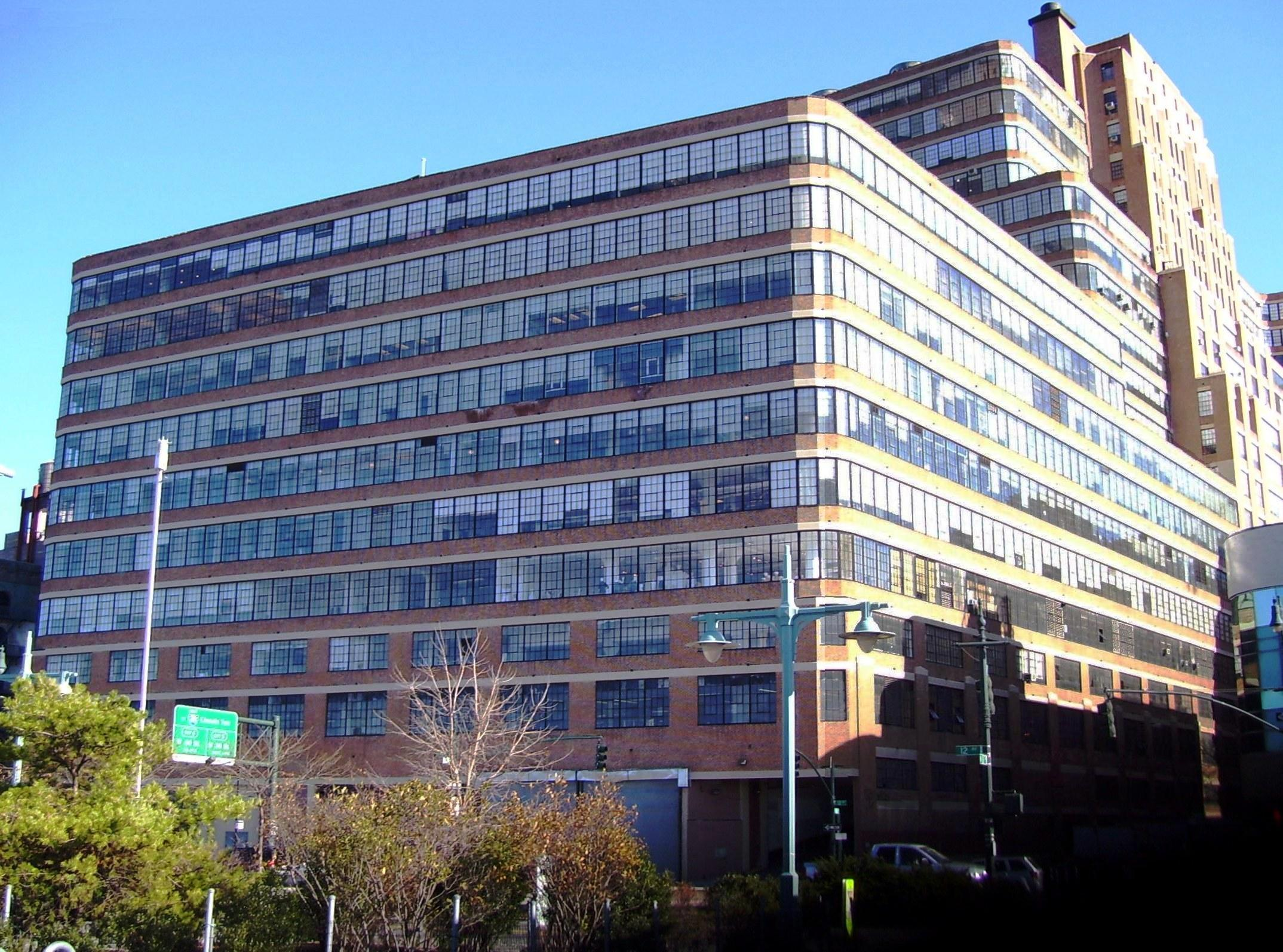
View of the building from Hudson River Park

The building was substantially completed on October 1, 1931, and members of a local civic group, the 23rd Street Association, toured the edifice the next month. The structure officially opened during the first week of December 1931. The Harrison S. Coburn Company was hired to lease out the space in the newly completed Starrett–Lehigh Building. Early tenants included trucking firm W. C. Mulligan & Co., wholesale firm Lamont, Corliss & Co., and sales representatives William Iselin & Co., the Westminster Tire Company, the Gimbel Brothers, and various food and wine distributors. In addition, architect R. Buckminster Fuller lived on the building's top floors. After William A. Starrett died in March 1932, the LV bought the building outright that June, assuming the $4.5 million mortgage. This allowed the LV to retain the land while continuing to earn income from tenants. The railroad had bought the Starrett–Lehigh Building at a discount; although the building had been valued at $8 million, the railroad had only taken over the mortgage without paying any cash.

The building was not immediately financially successful for several reasons, including declining demand for warehouse space during the Great Depression; the high cost of construction; and direct competition from the Port Authority Building, which rented space at lower rates. The construction of fixed crossings across the Hudson River, namely the Holland Tunnel, Lincoln Tunnel, and George Washington Bridge, also contributed to reduced demand for the Starrett–Lehigh Building, which relied mainly on business from car floats. The Starrett Company had planned to build a similar facility on the Passaic River in Newark, New Jersey, but canceled the plan after the Starrett–Lehigh Building was finished. The LV recorded a net loss of approximately $560,000 on the building during 1933, 1934, and the first four months of 1935. At a hearing in July 1935, Interstate Commerce Commission officials claimed that the LV was contributing to the building's unprofitability by giving certain companies up to a year's worth of free rent. At the time, the building was about 55 percent occupied, with 90 tenants. The Starrett–Lehigh Building did not reach full occupancy until 1943.

==== Friedus ownership ====
The Lehigh Valley Railroad disassociated itself from the Starrett–Lehigh Building in 1944. That November, Jacob Friedus bought the Starrett–Lehigh Building and the Lehigh–Bronx Building from the LV and assumed a $3.7 million mortgage that had been placed on both structures. The buildings' combined valuation was over $7 million at the time. Friedus and his partners obtained a $3.75 million mortgage for the building in July 1945, and Harry Helmsley began managing the building in 1946. Several newspapers profiled Friedus in detail after he purchased the Starrett–Lehigh Building; the large amount of media coverage prompted the Internal Revenue Service to investigate him, and the IRS prosecuted Friedus in 1949 for tax evasion.

Occupancy peaked in the 1940s and early 1950s, when over 5,000 people worked in the building. Many of the companies with offices in the building were printers. After World War II, freight train traffic in the U.S. declined because of the increasing popularity of freight trucking. About half of the ground story was converted to office and warehouse space around 1958, and the railroad tracks were removed in either 1956 or 1966. During the 1960s, over a dozen sportswear companies leased space in the building, including a subsidiary of Genesco. The building also attracted companies such as Hearst Communications' magazine division and Ilford Photo during that decade.

Friedus refinanced the Starrett–Lehigh Building in 1968, taking out a $9.8 million first mortgage and a $1.2 million second mortgage from the New York Bank for Savings. He received a third mortgage of $1.3 million in 1973, by which point only about 2,000 people continued to work at the Starrett–Lehigh Building amid a decline in demand for loft space in Manhattan. At the time, 40 percent of the building was vacant, slightly higher than the 30–35 percent vacancy rate across Manhattan's 4,200 loft buildings. With Friedus unable to pay off the Starrett–Lehigh Building's mortgages and loans, the building was placed into receivership in May 1973.

==== Helmsley ownership ====
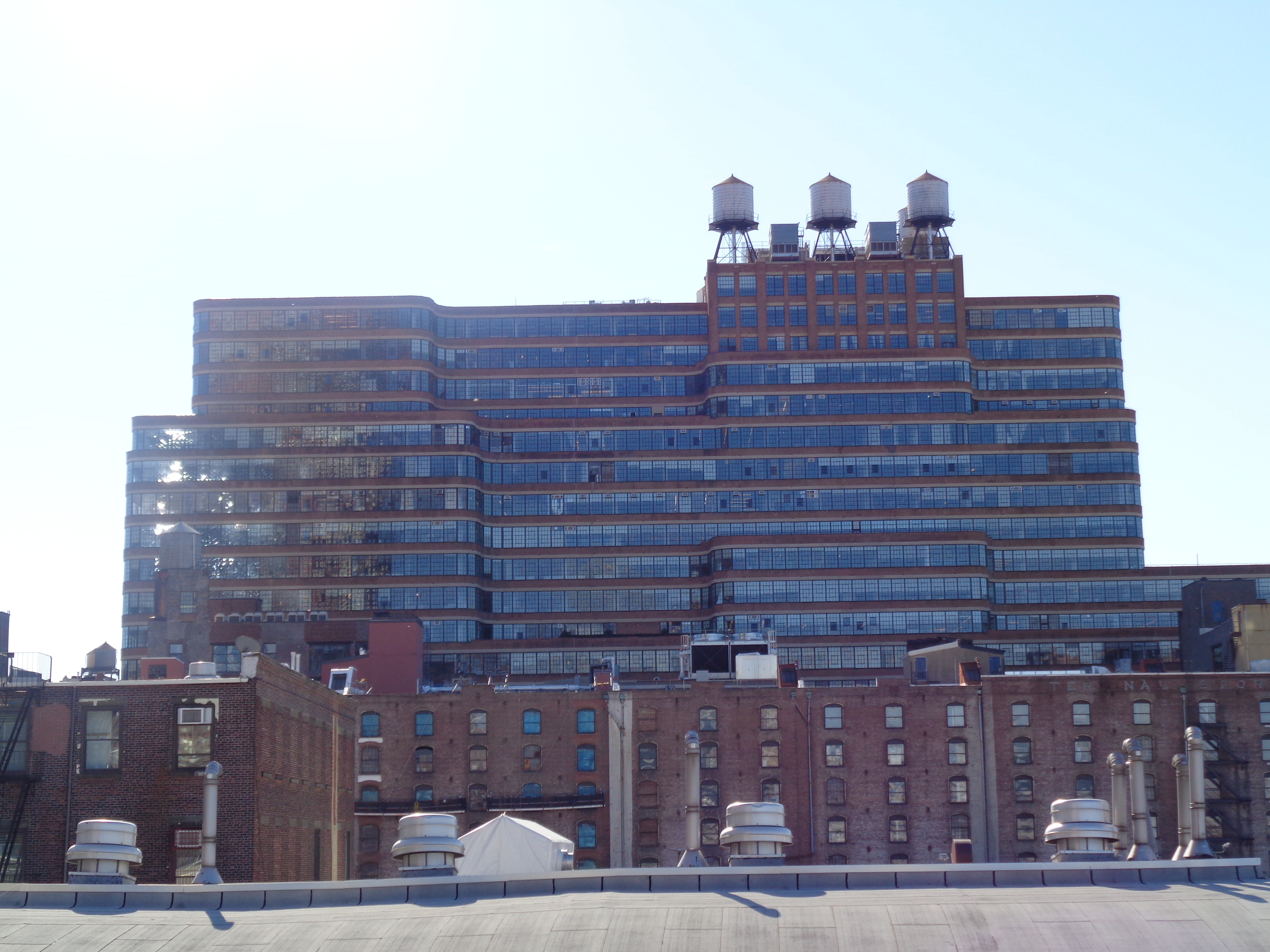
The Starrett–Lehigh Building as viewed from the High Line

The Starrett–Lehigh Building was sold at a foreclosure auction in August 1974 to Harry B. Helmsley. He bid $2.21 million, beating out the company that had foreclosed on the building by $10,000. Helmsley wanted to renovate the structure "to make it once again a first‐class manufacturing and warehouse facility". His company Helmsley-Spear took over the building, which in late 1975 had a 42 percent vacancy rate. Mayor Abraham Beame proposed that the vacant space be leased to garment manufacturers, but many garment firms were reluctant to relocate, as the structure was far from Manhattan's Garment District. By the end of the decade, vacancies had declined to 20 percent, and most tenants were using the building as a warehouse. The Starrett–Lehigh Building was fully occupied in the early 1980s. However, some tenants complained that the building had been allowed to deteriorate, with broken windows, holes in the walls, and leaking pipes, and that Helmsley-Spear had not done anything to fix these issues. A managing agent for the building recalled of Helmsley's ownership: "To call this building managed would be a tremendous exaggeration."

Several large tenants had gone bankrupt during the early 1990s recession, while other tenants (mainly in the printing industry) had been disadvantaged by the increasing popularity of computers and photocopy machines. The structure was one of New York City's largest manufacturing buildings by the late 1980s, at which point West Chelsea was one of the few remaining neighborhoods in New York City with both light manufacturing and a dense population. The building was 30 to 40 percent vacant by the early 1990s. Helmsley-Spear was renting out space at $6 per square foot ($65/m^{2}), which was higher than comparable warehouses in New Jersey but much lower than at 111 Eighth Avenue. The structure was mostly being used as a warehouse, but Motorola operated an appliance-repair shop at ground level. Furthermore, the Starrett–Lehigh Building was physically rundown, and its location far from any New York City Subway stations and the M23 bus made it unappealing to office tenants. The building continued to attract mainly industrial tenants into the early 1990s but was losing millions of dollars annually.

By the middle of the decade, art galleries and other art companies had begun to move into the building, which had become part of a growing "arts enclave" in Chelsea. The 12th and 14th floors were divided into spaces covering 4,000 to 25,000 square feet (370 to 2,320 m^{2}), which were rented to art galleries. Also in the mid-1990s several big-box retailers were considering opening stores in the Starrett–Lehigh Building. Rents remained low, averaging $9 per square foot ($97/m^{2}). One tenant at the time characterized the building as having "virtual shantytowns" with dozens of squatters. Following Harry Helmsley's death in 1997, his widow Leona Helmsley announced that she would sell nearly all of his buildings.

=== Conversion to office building ===
==== Sale and renovation ====
A group of investors bid $152 million for the building at an auction in June 1998. Among the new owners were Mark Karasick, as well as David Werner and First Boston. The owners hired Harry Skydell to renovate the building and market it to media companies; they intended to re-rent the building's space at $18 per square foot ($190/m^{2}). The group announced plans for four new passenger elevators to supplement the four existing elevators. In addition, Ludwig Michael Goldsmith redesigned the lobby's facade, and an etched glass wall was installed in the lobby. The owners added nine rooftop cooling units and ventilation louvers. To attract tenants, the owners also added a ground-level food court and bought out the lease of a diner on 12th Avenue to make way for an upscale restaurant. The new owners rented the space for $25 to $30 per square foot ($270 to $320/m^{2}), and rents in the immediate area often surpassed $40 per square foot ($430/m^{2}). The edifice was advertised as the "Starrett-Lehigh Center for Creative Arts, Media and Technology".

Media firms and art galleries began replacing the industrial tenants, and many photography studios, which had moved into the building in the mid-1990s, were forced out. By 1999, the owners had leased out 500,000 square feet (46,000 m^{2}) and were in the process of leasing out another 500,000 square feet. Seventy percent of the building was leased at the time, and one-third of the tenants were dot-com companies, such as Martha Stewart Living Omnimedia. Other tenants included photography studio Day for Night, whose presence "helped put Starrett-Lehigh on the fashion map" according to The New York Times; as well as a business incubator. As demand for office space increased, the owners relocated or bought out the leases of many small tenants, allowing larger tenants to rent large amounts of space. The owners had spent over $22 million on renovations by 2001. The owners refinanced the building in late 2001 with a $208 million loan from Wachovia.

By the early 2000s, tenants had expressed dissatisfaction over the building's dilapidated condition and the lack of a nearby subway station. The building's tenants had to wait up to 50 minutes to catch one of the four elevators, which were often filled to capacity. Tenants also complained about intermittent heat and electricity; cockroach infestations; missing fire alarms; and diesel emissions created by portable power generators. When the dot-com bubble burst in the early 2000s, many dot-com tenants moved out. Most of the vacant offices had been rented as unfurnished space, and many tenants never furnished their offices before the dot-com crash. After the September 11 attacks, companies relocated from the destroyed World Trade Center to buildings with furnished offices, and the Starrett–Lehigh Building only gained two large tenants from the World Trade Center: Zurich North America (which quickly moved out) and the United States Customs Service. Many companies looking for cheap space had relocated near the subway.

A quarter of the building, 560,000 square feet (52,000 m^{2}), was vacant by 2003; one broker said the building had "security issues" because it was several blocks from the nearest subway stop. The large vacant spaces began to attract fashion companies in the mid-2000s, such as Club Monaco, Hugo Boss, Tommy Hilfiger, Comme des Garcons, and Carolina Herrera. Gramercy Capital also placed a $38.7 million mezzanine loan on the building, and SL Green Realty took over the mezzanine loan in 2010.

==== RXR ownership ====
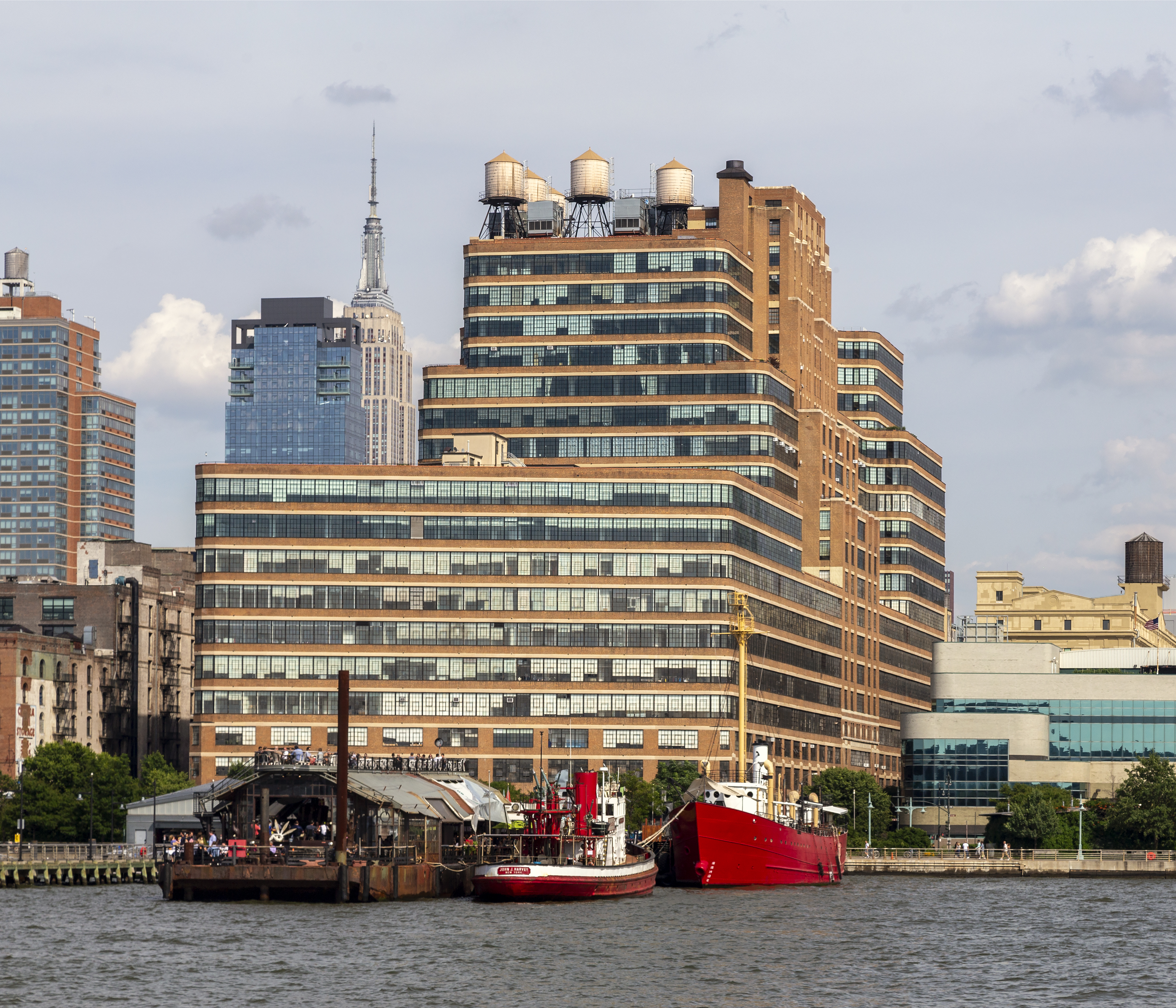
The building as viewed from the Hudson River

In April 2011, a joint venture between Mark Karasick and Douglas W. Shorenstein's firm Shorenstein Properties agreed to sell the Starrett–Lehigh Building to Scott Rechler's RXR Realty for $900 million. At the time, the building's tenants included Martha Stewart Living Omnimedia, advertising agency McGarryBowen, and several fashion companies; Nicolai Ouroussoff of the Times said the building was "now mostly offices for architects, photo studios and Martha Stewart." In part because of the development of the nearby High Line park, a wide variety of residential and commercial tenants had begun to move into the area, and, as such, RXR wished to attract more retail and office tenants. The sale was finalized in August 2011 for $920 million. Rechler announced plans to spend $50 million on renovating the lobby, as he believed that the upcoming 7 Subway Extension to 34th Street–Hudson Yards would increase the area's desirability.

By early 2012, several major tenants had expanded their office space; Dentsu International had expanded to 170,000 square feet (16,000 m^{2}), while Tommy Hilfiger had grown to 350,000 square feet (33,000 m^{2}). RXR also rented the building's space out for as high as $60 per square foot ($650/m^{2}). A vice president for the company said: "There were tenants in there that were enjoying a much lower rent than what the market bears now." RXR replaced the mechanical systems and many of the windows during the 2010s. Because of a shortage of restaurants in the area, in 2012, RXR began operating a "food truck court" for employees and visitors on the upper floors during weekdays. The building was nearly fully occupied by the mid-2010s; through the end of the decade, many of the tenants were fashion companies. RXR sold a 50 percent stake in the Starrett–Lehigh Building and five other properties to Blackstone Inc. in early 2015; the sale valued these structures at $4 billion. The owners also spent $23 million to replace the building's windows with more energy-efficient units, for which the building received the New York Landmarks Conservancy's Lucy G. Moses Preservation Award in 2019.

RXR refinanced the building in September 2018 with a $900 million loan originated by Morgan Stanley and New York Community Bank. The same year, RXR hired the firm ICRAVE to design 43,000 square feet (4,000 m^{2}) of exposition space in the building, including an 11,000-square-foot (1,000 m^{2}) food hall. The project involved adding 18,000 square feet (1,700 m^{2}) of retail space and 6,000 square feet (560 m^{2}) of event space. The food hall was leased in 2020 to Chicago-based company 16" on Center, and RXR leased one of the storefronts to chef Marcus Samuelsson in 2021. RXR hired Studios Architecture in 2021 to redesign the building as a "vertical campus"; the work, expected to be completed in 2023, included converting some of the truck bays to amenity areas. In August 2022, the New York City Landmarks Preservation Commission (LPC) approved RXR's plan to build a roof garden above the tenth floor, to be designed by HLW International and Studios Architecture. The building's food hall, Olly Olly Market, opened in October 2022 with 11 food stalls. The building hosted many arts and fashion tenants by the 2020s, and Gemini Office Venture, a newly-created subsidiary of RXR, refinanced the building for $1.1 billion around that time.

== Notable tenants ==
As of 2024, the building's tenants included:

- Canada Goose, clothing company
- Centre for Social Innovation
- Club Monaco US
- Diller Scofidio + Renfro, architectural firm
- Elite World Group, talent management firm
- Fashionphile, fashion retail company
- McGarryBowen, advertising agency
- Populous, architectural firm
- Ralph Lauren, fashion retail company
- Tommy Hilfiger USA, clothing company; the building's largest tenant
- Scholastic Corporation, publisher
- Under Armour, clothing and accessories company

In addition, New York Fashion Week has been hosted at the building since 2024.

== Impact ==
=== Critical reception ===
When the building was completed, The New York Times characterized the structure as being "in modern style, with an unusual amount of the usual wall space taken up by windows". Similarly, the Real Estate Record and Guide described it as "a structure which, from an engineering and architectural point of view, is as unusual as it is striking." In 1931, Lewis Mumford wrote in The New Yorker that "the contrast between the long, continuous red-brick bands and the green-framed windows, with sapphire reflections or depths, is as sound a use of color as one can see about the city"; he objected only to the presence of water towers and the central bay.

The building continued to receive commentary in later years. The New York Times described the building in 1987 as "a classic of Art Deco industrial architecture sheathed in dramatic ribbons of glass, concrete and brick". Christopher Gray, of the same paper, characterized the Starrett–Lehigh Building as "the flashy main course" as compared with the "chastely elegant appetizer" of the B&O terminal to the south. John Freeman Gill of the Times wrote in 2022 that the building was "hailed as a masterwork of industrial modernism, a triumph both of engineering and of International Style architectural aesthetics" when completed. Not all commentary was positive; a reporter for Interior Design magazine wrote in 2000 that the building's inadequate mechanical systems, dilapidated elevators, remote location, and internal design "represents the failure of imagination of designers seeking to create an appropriately progressive environment for their newfangled, hightech, 21st-century clients".

=== Awards and influences ===
The Starrett–Lehigh Building received an award of merit from the 23rd Street Association when it was completed. The building was displayed in Henry-Russell Hitchcock and Philip Johnson's "Modern Architecture: International Exhibition" show at the Museum of Modern Art in 1932; it was one of ten buildings in New York City, and one of six not designed by a major architectural firm, to appear at the show. Compared to the McGraw-Hill Building on 42nd Street, Hitchcock and Johnson described the Starrett–Lehigh Building as "a more radical example of the same tendency [of horizontal emphasis], but it was less conscious aesthetically". The Skyscraper Museum displayed the building in a 2011 exhibition of 20th-century industrial structures. According to Nicolai Ouroussoff, the exhibit showed that the Starrett–Lehigh Building was a "dazzling example of an urban factory".

A writer for the Times said the Starrett–Lehigh Building's design was "an obvious inspiration for Frank Lloyd Wright's Johnson Wax Building", completed in 1936. In the late 20th and early 21st centuries, the Starrett–Lehigh Building's architecture also inspired that of the Lipstick Building, an office building in Midtown Manhattan; the Bromley, an apartment tower on the Upper West Side; and 495 West Street, a residential condominium in the West Village. The building's corners were also copied in Zaha Hadid's design of 520 West 28th Street, a nearby residential building constructed in the 2010s.

The LPC had considered designating the Starrett–Lehigh Building as a city landmark in 1982, and the LPC declared the structure a New York City landmark in 1986. In addition, the building is part of the West Chelsea Historic District, designated by the LPC in 2008.

== See also ==
- List of New York City Designated Landmarks in Manhattan from 14th to 59th Streets
