= 32 Old Slip =

Office skyscraper in Manhattan, New York

32 Old Slip One Financial Square
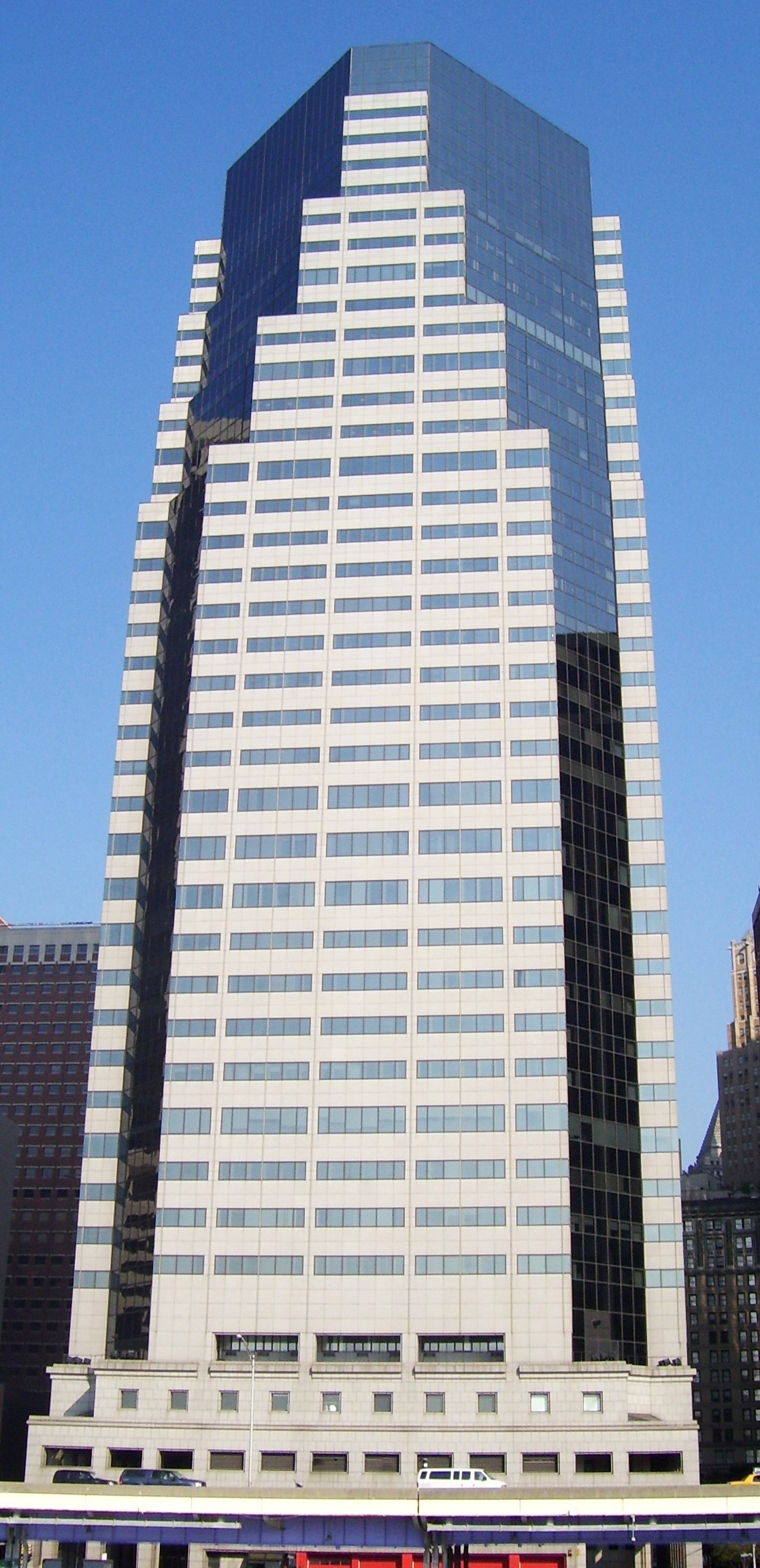
- as seen from the East River

General information
- Architectural style: Postmodernism
- Location: Financial District, Manhattan, 32 Old Slip, New York City, United States
- Coordinates: 40°42′14″N 74°00′28″W
- Completed: 1987
- Owner: RXR Realty

Height
- Height: 575 ft 0 in (175.26 m)

Technical details
- Floor count: 36
- Floor area: 1,161,435 square feet (107,900.8 m^{2})
- Lifts/elevators: 31 (26 passenger, 2 freight, 2 garage, 1 messenger)

Design and construction
- Architecture firm: Edward Durell Stone & Associates
- Developer: HRO International Ltd.

Other information
- Parking: 108 spaces

Website
- 32oldslipnyc.com

32 Old Slip, also known as One Financial Square, is a skyscraper in the Financial District of Lower Manhattan in New York City. Completed in 1987, the building has 36 floors and stands at 575 ft 0 in (175.26 m). 32 Old Slip was designed by the firm of Edward Durell Stone Associates for developer Howard Ronson and his firm HRO International. It is home to various office tenants, including a Convene convention center and the New York Regional Office of the United States Census Bureau. The ground floor houses the New York City Fire Department (FDNY) Engine Company 4 and Ladder Company 15.

Designed in a postmodern style, the building has a granite and glass facade, with several setbacks tapering to an octagonal curtain wall. The floor sizes range from 23,404 to 38,750 square feet (2,174.3 to 3,600.0 m^{2}) of rentable space, totaling 1,161,435 square feet (107,900.8 m^{2}). At ground level, a privately owned arcade and urban plaza surround the building.

The building's site previously held the United States Assay Office, completed in 1932. HRO bought the Assay office site in 1983 and erected One Financial Square on the site. After HRO defaulted on its mortgage in 1995, the Paramount Group purchased the property, selling it to Beacon Capital Partners. 32 Old Slip was battered with storm waters during Hurricane Sandy in 2012 and was subsequently renovated. RXR Realty agreed to purchase the building from Beacon in 2014. RXR immediately sold the fee interest in the underlying land to Melohn Properties, who in turn sold the land to iStar in July 2021.

== Site ==
One Financial Square is at 32 Old Slip in the Financial District of Lower Manhattan in New York City. Although the building is officially located on Old Slip, it contains a vanity address of 1 Financial Square. The land lot covers an entire city block bounded by Old Slip to the southwest, Front Street to the northwest, Gouverneur Lane to the northeast, and South Street and FDR Drive to the southeast. The site covers 42,176 ft^{2} (3,918.3 m^{2}), with a frontage of 216 ft (66 m) on Front and South Streets and a depth of 203.33 ft (61.97 m) along Gouverneur Lane and Old Slip. The New York City Police Museum and 55 Water Street are directly to the southwest, while the Pier 11/Wall Street ferry terminal is to the east. Three blocks south of the building is the South Ferry transportation hub, consisting of the New York City Subway's South Ferry/Whitehall Street station and the Staten Island Ferry's Whitehall Terminal.

The building's site previously held the United States Assay Office, which by the 1980s was the last public gold refinery in the United States. Designed by James A. Wetmore, the Assay Office was a five-story structure with a granite facade and steel superstructure. The site of the Assay Office, selected in November 1929 by U.S. Treasury secretary Andrew Mellon, had contained 15 buildings of four to five stories tall, some dating back almost a century. The land was acquired over the next five months, and the Assay Office was completed in 1932 at a cost of $3.5 million. In addition to refining gold, the Assay Office melted damaged coins and incinerated damaged paper money.

== Architecture ==
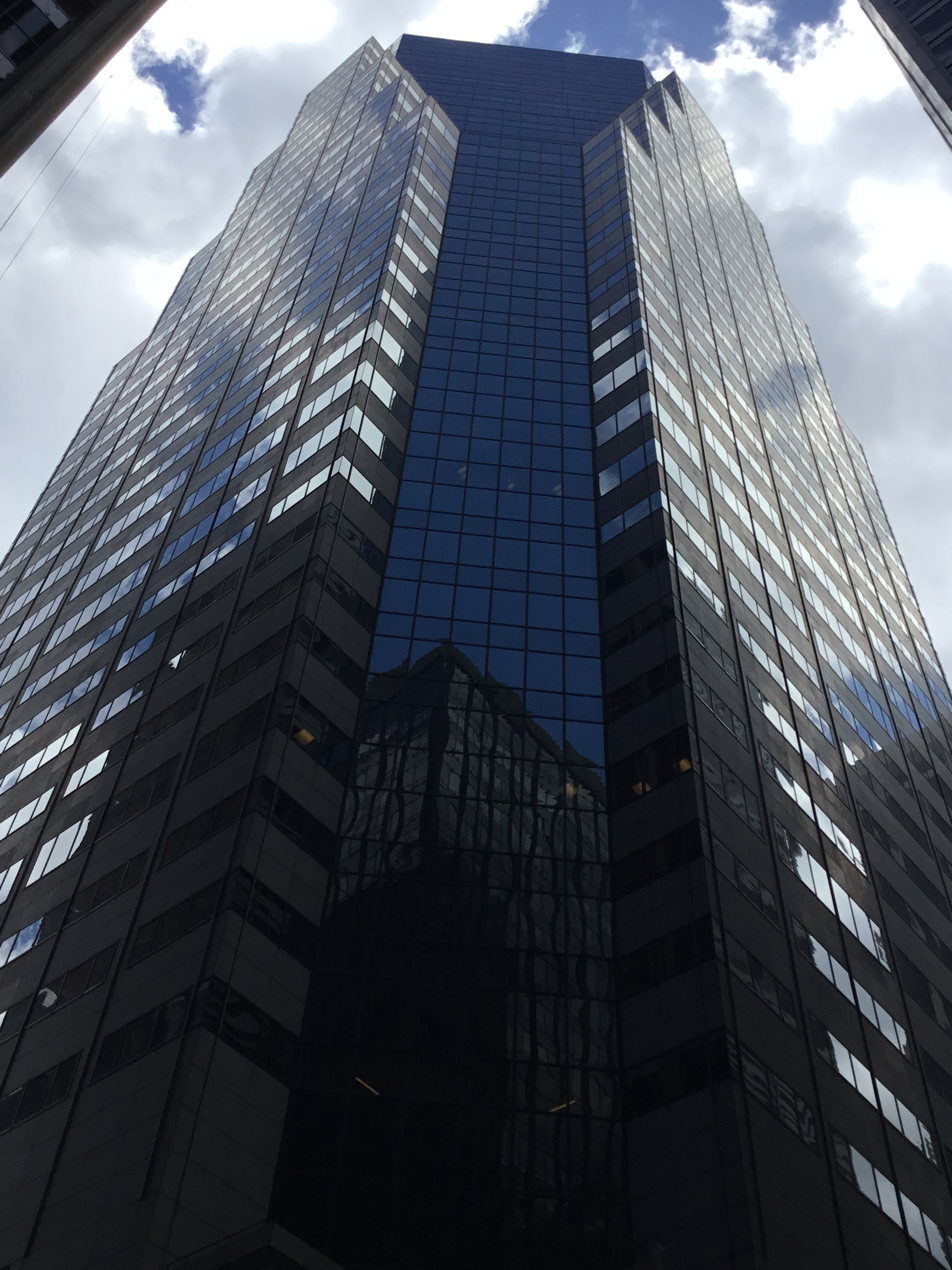
View of the building

32 Old Slip was designed by the firm of Edward Durell Stone Associates for developer Howard Ronson and his firm HRO International. The building is designed in a postmodern style.

=== Form and facade ===
The building is 36 stories tall. The base is quadrilateral in form and is clad with polished granite and silver-tinted glass. The windows are composed of double panes of thermal glass, set within aluminum frames. This gives way to several setbacks, eventually resulting in an octagonal, entirely glass curtain wall. The setbacks are placed above the 3rd, 25th, 29th, 33rd, 37th, and 38th floors.

To attain more interior area than would otherwise have been allowed, Ronson acquired 135,000 square feet (12,500 m^{2}) of air rights from three neighboring buildings, two of which have since been demolished. These are the New York City Police Museum directly to the west; a demolished fire station on Old Slip between Front and Water Streets; and the demolished United States Assay Office at the address 32 Old Slip. In addition, the southern part of Front Street was removed from city street maps and was converted into a tax lot.

The base of 32 Old Slip contains a fire station on South Street, replacing an old firehouse on Old Slip. The firehouse is the headquarters of New York City Fire Department (FDNY) Engine Company 4 and Ladder Company 15. The current firehouse is four times the previous firehouse, which was demolished to make way for a plaza. At ground level, a privately owned arcade and urban plaza surround the building. There is a U-shaped arcade running along Gouverneur Lane, Front Street, and Old Slip, screened by a group of polished-granite columns. The arcade has skylights at all four corners and is nearly twice as large as the building's public plaza. The public plaza itself is on Gouverneur Lane and contains several polished-granite benches. HRO also funded the installation of a plaza in the median of Old Slip, which is owned by the city government.

=== Features ===
The foundations are made of steel pilings that support reinforced concrete-slab walls. The superstructure is made of steel, with concrete floor slabs that can carry live loads of 100 pounds per square foot (4.8 kPa). There are 26 passenger elevators leading from the lobby to the upper floors, which are grouped into four banks. Elevator banks A, B, C, and D respectively serve floors 2–9, 10–17, 18–24, and 25–36. There are also three hydro elevators (two from the lobby to the sub-cellar and one from the lobby to the cellar), as well as two freight elevators from the sub-cellar to floor 37. Two of the hydro elevators are garage elevators, while the third is a "messenger elevator". Five stairways are also located throughout the building, and there are two escalators between the lobby and the second floor. Beneath the structure is a parking garage with 104 parking spaces. In addition, there is a bike room, mail room, concierge, messenger center, and convention center.

There are column-free spaces on each floor and a 40 ft 0 in (12.19 m) lobby. The floor sizes range from 23,404 to 38,750 square feet (2,174.3 to 3,600.0 m^{2}) of rentable space, totaling 1,161,435 square feet (107,900.8 m^{2}). Generally, the building has a slab-to-slab height of 13.5 feet (4.1 m) as measured between the floor and ceiling. The building could provide at least 12.5 watts per square foot (0.180 hp/m^{2}) of electricity to each story. Most of the office stories have ceilings of 8.5 feet (2.6 m). There are eight "special use" stories, which have 12-foot (3.7 m) ceilings and can provide up to 75 watts per square foot (1.08 hp/m^{2}) of electricity. These stories could accommodate raised floors for financial firms, insurance companies, or other firms that used large amounts of power for computers.

Floors 3 and 37 contain the building's primary mechanical rooms, ventilation units, and electrical equipment. Each story also has mechanical equipment rooms with air-conditioning units and air-filtration equipment. Heat from the New York City steam system is provided to four steam converters on floors 3 and 37. The roof has five water cooling units as well as cooling towers. In case of an emergency, there are four electrical generators for tenants and two generators for the building's mechanical systems. The roof has a 15,080-U.S.-gallon (57,100 L) water tank, and the cellar has an automatic fire pump and a manual fire pump that can draw water from the New York City water supply system. There are two water pumps for the building's domestic water service: one each in the cellar and on floor 3. Two 6-inch-wide (15 cm) pipes (a sewage pipe and a storm drain) connect with the New York City sewer system.

== History ==
=== 20th century ===
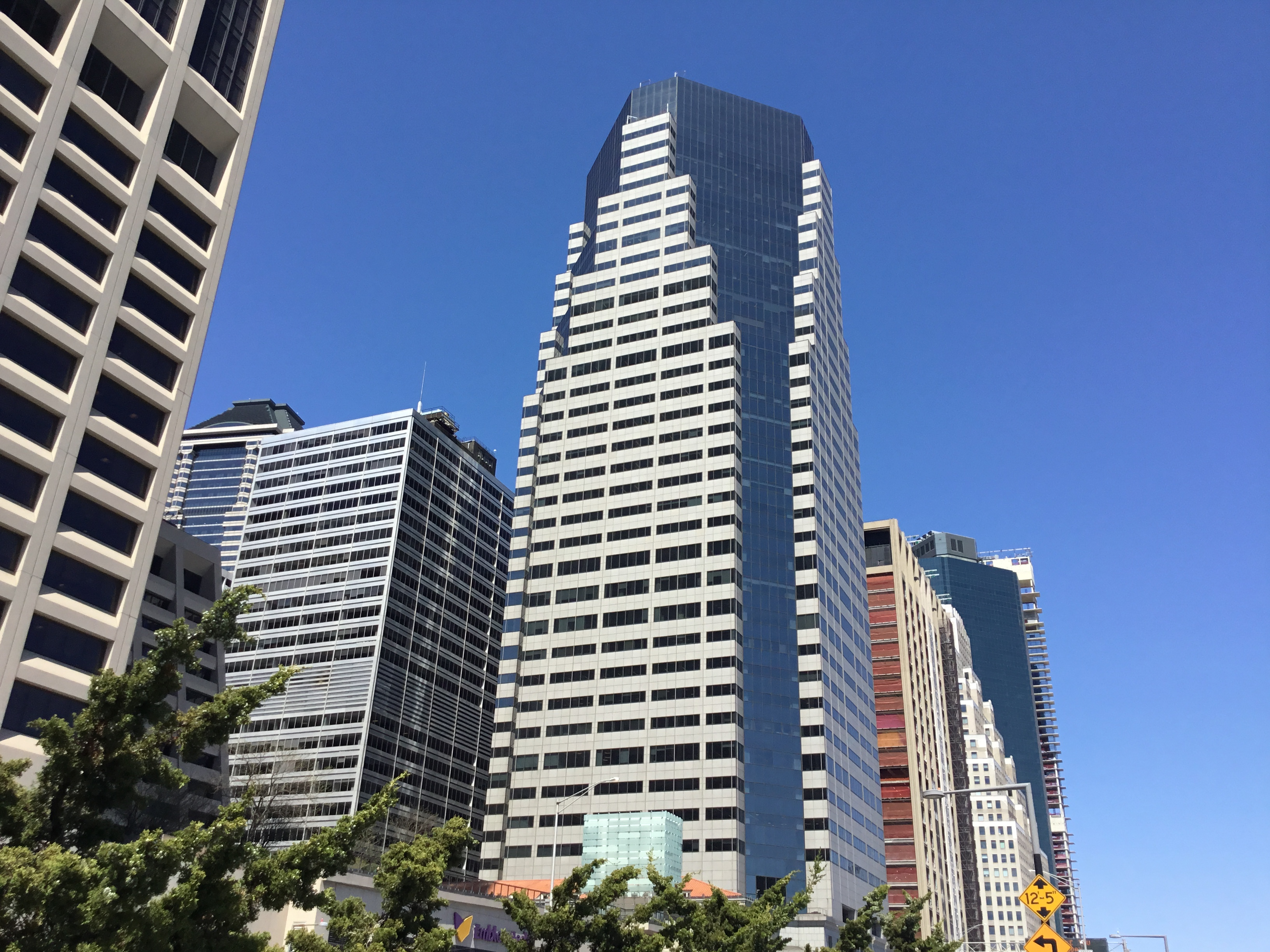
View of One Financial Square from FDR Drive

In 1983, the United States Mint put the 42,176 square feet (3,918.3 m^{2}) Assay Office up for auction. Beginning at US$3 million, the winning bid was made by Howard Ronson's HRO International Ltd., which offered $27 million. The sale established it as the most valuable government estate sold at public auction. The Assay Office building was demolished in 1986. The next year, HRO built a 36-story building called One Financial Square on the site of the Assay Office. At the time, Financial Square was the largest project that HRO had developed in New York City. During excavations for the site, contractors found several cannons from late-17th and early-18th century British vessels, which were given to the South Street Seaport Museum.

One of the earliest tenants was Thomson McKinnon Securities, which leased 560,000 square feet (52,000 m^{2}) in the building in December 1985. There was high demand for office space in the Financial District at the time, and One Financial Square was one of eight new office buildings in the area with available space. However, demand for office space in New York City declined after Black Monday in 1987, and tenants such as Thomson McKinnon Securities looked to sublease their space. The building was half-empty by 1993. The now-defunct Japanese bank Sanwa had given a mortgage loan of $340 million or $350 million for the building. Ronson defaulted on the mortgage in 1995.

The Paramount Group purchased the property for $135 million in 1995, financing the purchase with a $96 million loan from Sanwa. According to a Paramount executive, the firm had finalized the purchase less than 45 days after it had learned that the building was on sale. To attract tenants, Paramount hosted a party for which it sent out toy helicopters along with its invitations. The Royal Bank of Canada leased space in the building until 1997.

=== 21st century ===
Paramount signed American International Group to a 10-year, 260,000 square feet (24,000 m^{2}) lease in 2006, which was one of the largest leases in Manhattan that year. AIG occupied seven floors of the building next door to their headquarters at 180 Maiden Lane. In August 2007, Paramount sold the building to Beacon Capital Partners for $751 million, which at the time was one of the largest sales on record of an office building in Lower Manhattan. That October, Beacon secured a $500 million loan from MetLife to fund the acquisition. At the time, it was 90 percent occupied, with tenants including AIG, BNY Mellon, Daiwa, Goldman Sachs, HIP, and the General Services Administration.

Like many buildings in Lower Manhattan, 32 Old Slip was battered with storm waters during Hurricane Sandy in 2012. In contrast to most in the region, the building was designed to resist a powerful earthquake, which in part made the structure less prone to flooding. Within a year the building's market value had declined by $65.7 million. In 2013 a renovation effort began to add improved flood barriers, pumps and piping systems to better ward against future storms. In January 2013, construction firm Hunter Roberts leased 37,000 square feet (3,400 m^{2}) on the 10th floor, and the United States Census Bureau leased 40,000 square feet (3,700 m^{2}) on the 8th and 9th floors. In addition, Convene leased 36,000 square feet (3,300 m^{2}) for a corporate center on the second floor, which opened in April 2013. Convene's space had formerly contained a training center for Goldman Sachs, which had vacated 32 Old Slip in 2009, after Goldman's headquarters at 200 West Street opened. BNY also moved out of the building during 2013.

RXR Realty agreed to purchase the building from Beacon Capital Partners in December 2014 for $675 million, finalizing its purchase the following April. RXR financed the purchase with a $325 million loan from GE Capital. Immediately after buying the building, RXR sold the fee interest in the underlying land to Melohn Properties for $197.5 million. Shortly after RXR's purchase, health care advertising firm Cement Bloc leased 55,000 square feet (5,100 m^{2}) on the 15th and 16th floors of the building. The American Arbitration Association subleased 47,000 square feet (4,400 m^{2}) on the 33rd and 36th floors in September 2017 from insurance company Axa XL. In October 2018, law firm Cahill Gordon & Reindel leased 201,621 square feet (18,731.2 m^{2}), moving their headquarters from nearby 80 Pine Street. The same month, commercial insurance brokerage Alliant Insurance Services leased 55,938 square feet (5,196.8 m^{2}) and creative agency Decoded Advertising leased 15,518 square feet (1,441.7 m^{2}) in the building. In 2019, Mesa West loaned $404 million to RXR for a refinancing of 32 Old Slip.

Buying insurance startup Policygenius leased the 30th, 31st, and partial 5th floors in May 2020, and visual effects company FuseFX leased part of the 17th floor that July. Melohn sold the land to iStar in July 2021 for $90.5 million, and the Carlyle Group acquired iStar's net-lease portfolio in early 2022, including the land under 32 Old Slip. In May 2025, a consortium composed of Barclays, Goldman Sachs, and Morgan Stanley refinanced the land under the building for $167 million. Oppenheimer & Co leased 220,000 square feet (20,000 m^{2}) of the building in October 2026.

== In media ==
The building's construction was documented in the 1990 short film Going Up by Gary Pollard, which was featured in Season 3 of the PBS television program POV. Both the interior and exterior of the building were depicted in the 1999 film The Thomas Crown Affair.

== See also ==
- List of tallest buildings in New York City
