= RXR Realty =

American real estate company

RXR Realty, LLC
- Industry: Real estate
- Founded: 2007
- Founder: Scott Rechler
- Headquarters: Uniondale, New York, and New York, New York
- Website: rxr.com

RXR Realty is a privately held real estate and infrastructure private equity firm based in New York City. As of 2023, its portfolio of commercial, residential, multifamily, infrastructure, and logistics projects includes 91 commercial real estate properties and investments held across the country. RXR employs around 450 people.

== History ==
Scott Rechler founded RXR in 2007 after the 2006 acquisition by SL Green Realty of Reckson Associates Realty, at which he was chairman and CEO.

In 2011, RXR Realty purchased the Starrett-Lehigh Building, located at 601 West 26th Street. Following a $900 million recapitalization, the building began extensive renovations to transform the property in 2022.

In December 2013, NorthStar Realty Finance Corp invested $340 million in RXR. NorthStar and RXR also launched a $2 billion non-traded real estate investment trust in February 2015, which later wound down in 2018. In 2015, The Blackstone Group agreed to buy a 50% stake in six RXR properties located in New York State and New Jersey.

In 2016, RXR Realty completed the purchase of Garvies Point, a waterfront mixed-use development in Glen Cove, Long Island. Since its acquisition, RXR has transformed the former industrial site into a community with over 27 acres of public space, 1,100 residential units, and 75,000 square feet of commercial and retail space. The company participated in a $41 million fundraising round for Metropolis Technologies in 2021.

With Blackstone, the firm sold 1330 Sixth Avenue in December 2022. In February 2023, the Financial Times reported that the firm would likely return some office buildings in its portfolio to lenders. The Financial Times further reported that the firm would explore converting office buildings into housing, and noted the legal challenges and costs associated with these conversions. The firm later clarified that it was only exploring relinquishing or converting two of its office buildings. RXR did not disclose which buildings it was considering for disposition or conversion. However, the Commercial Observer identified 47 Hall Street in Brooklyn as having high vacancy rates, and Crain's New York Business reported that RXR was exploring the conversion of the Adams Express Building in Manhattan to residences. RXR has also begun lending against office and apartment assets; Rechler predicted in February 2023 that the firm would originate some $2 billion in loans over the year.

In January 2022, RXR Realty rebranded as RXR. In the same year, RXR announced a $2 billion investment in multifamily residential developments as part of a national expansion plan.

In November 2022, along with the Port Authority of New York and New Jersey, RXR, Vantage Airport Group, American Triple I, and Jetblue announced a partnership for a $4.2 billion development of a new international terminal at John F. Kennedy Airport.

RXR purchased a development site in Apex, North Carolina, with homebuilder Lennar in February 2023. The plan for the development calls for housing, educational facilities, and facilities for life-sciences research.

== Properties ==
RXR Realty owns or manages 93 commercial, residential and retail properties in the New York City area. Notable properties include:

- 1166 Avenue of the Americas, The International Paper Building, Manhattan
- 340 Madison Avenue, Manhattan
- 450 Lexington Avenue, Manhattan
- 237 Park Avenue, Manhattan
- 75 Rockefeller Plaza, Manhattan
- 530 Fifth Avenue, Manhattan
- Adams Express Building, 61 Broadway, Manhattan
- Starrett-Lehigh Building, Manhattan
- 620 Avenue Of The Americas, Manhattan
- Standard Motor Products Building, Long Island City, Queens
- 470 Vanderbilt Avenue, Brooklyn
- 32 Old Slip, Manhattan
- Helmsley Building, Manhattan
- 625 RXR Plaza, Uniondale, formerly known as EAB Plaza

Notable multifamily properties include:

- 475 Clermont, Brooklyn.
- Magnolia Dumbo, Brooklyn.
- The Willoughby, Brooklyn
- 2413 Third Avenue, Bronx.
- Harbor Landing at Garvies Point, Glen Cove.
- Village Square, Glen Cove.

=== Development ===
RXR Realty is a developer of real estate projects which include:

- Pier 57, Manhattan, New York.In 2014, RXR Realty along with Youngwoo and Associates formed a joint partnership to redevelop the historic Pier 57 in Hudson River Park on the West Side of Manhattan. Construction of the original site began in 1950 and at the time Pier 57 was the largest dock-building effort ever undertaken by the City of New York. Following years of disrepair, the partnership led to extensive renovations of the pier. RXR oversaw the building and leasing of the office component of the project while Youngwoo & Associates focused on building a retail mall on the ground floor of the pier. The renovated Pier 57 includes an added three buildings of nearly 630,000 square feet of office space which is currently operated by Google. The site’s two-acre park space opened to the general public in April 2022. In April 2023, the property’s new market curated by the James Beard Foundation (JBF) opened.
- New Rochelle Downtown Redevelopment. The project includes development of the library, train station, offices, parks and condos.
- Garvies Point, Glen Cove, Long Island. Garvies Point is a waterfront mixed use development area with plans for condo and rental units, a marina and retail shops.
- Ritz-Carlton Residences at North Hills, Long Island
- Ritz-Carlton Residences at Inner Harbor, Baltimore, Maryland
- Atlantic Station, Stamford, Connecticut (as RXR/Cappelli)
- Engineers Country Club, Roslyn Harbor, New York

=== Attempted purchases ===
- In October 2013, the company attempted to buy One Worldwide Plaza but lost to American Realty Capital. RXR Realty filed a $200 million lawsuit attempting to block the sale due to their claim that American Realty Capital unethically used RXR's financial analysis to form a higher bid.
- Also in October 2013, RXR was outbid by Shanghai-based Fosun International Ltd in their effort to acquire One Chase Manhattan Plaza.

== Philanthropy ==
In March 2020, RXR Realty has contributed $1 million to support organizations and residents of New Rochelle who face the effects of coronavirus. Samantha M. Nicholson of Miami Beach also contributed $1 million. In its initiative, RXR's collaborates with the Westchester Community Foundation.

In June 2022, RXR announced a new grant program for the residents of New Rochelle, totaling $500,000.
