= Scott Rechler =

American businessman

- Born: November 4, 1967 (age 59)
- Occupations: CEO and Chairman of RXR Realty
- Spouse: Debby Feldstein
- Children: 3

Scott Rechler (born November 4, 1967) is an American businessman. He is CEO and chairman of RXR Realty, making him one of the most prominent landlords in New York City. Previously, Rechler was the vice chairman of the Port Authority of New York and New Jersey, chairman of the Regional Plan Association, and a member of the Metropolitan Transportation Authority board.

== Career ==
Rechler was born to a Jewish family, the son of Lita (née Rudy) and Roger Rechler. He was raised in Port Washington, New York on Long Island. His grandfather, William Rechler, developed the design for the lightweight foldable aluminum chair after World War II. He later founded Reckson Associates in 1958. Scott Rechler joined the company in 1989 and led its initial public offering in 1995 forming Reckson Associates Realty Corp. (NYSE:RA). Rechler became chief operating officer and later co-CEO of the company along with his Uncle Donald Rechler Scott helped lead Reckson's expansion beyond Long Island into the New York and tri-state region. In 2003, Rechler was named chief executive. The company was acquired in early 2007 by SL Green Realty Corp. for $6 billion, which resulted in a 700 percent total return for Reckson shareholders. Afterwards, Rechler formed RXR Realty and became CEO and Chairman of the organization. By 2017, RXR managed over 22 million square feet of commercial real estate and held more than $15.7 billion in assets under management. As of March 31, 2023, RXR has an estimated $20 billion in gross asset value.

Rechler was appointed to the Port Authority of New York and New Jersey by Governor Andrew Cuomo in 2011, where he oversaw the redevelopment of LaGuardia Airport and the World Trade Center. He became vice-chairman of the organization in 2012.

In 2015, Rechler was recognized as one of the most powerful people in New York City real estate by the Commercial Observer's Power 100 list.

In October 2016, Rechler was elected chairman of the board of directors of the Regional Plan Association, a position he kept until 2022. In June 2017, he was named as a member of the Metropolitan Transportation Authority board.

In 2018, Rechler was recognized by City & State New York as being one of Long Island’s most influential and powerful people. Rechler is a regular contributor on commercial real estate market trends with commentary appearing on CNBC and in Fortune and The Wall Street Journal.

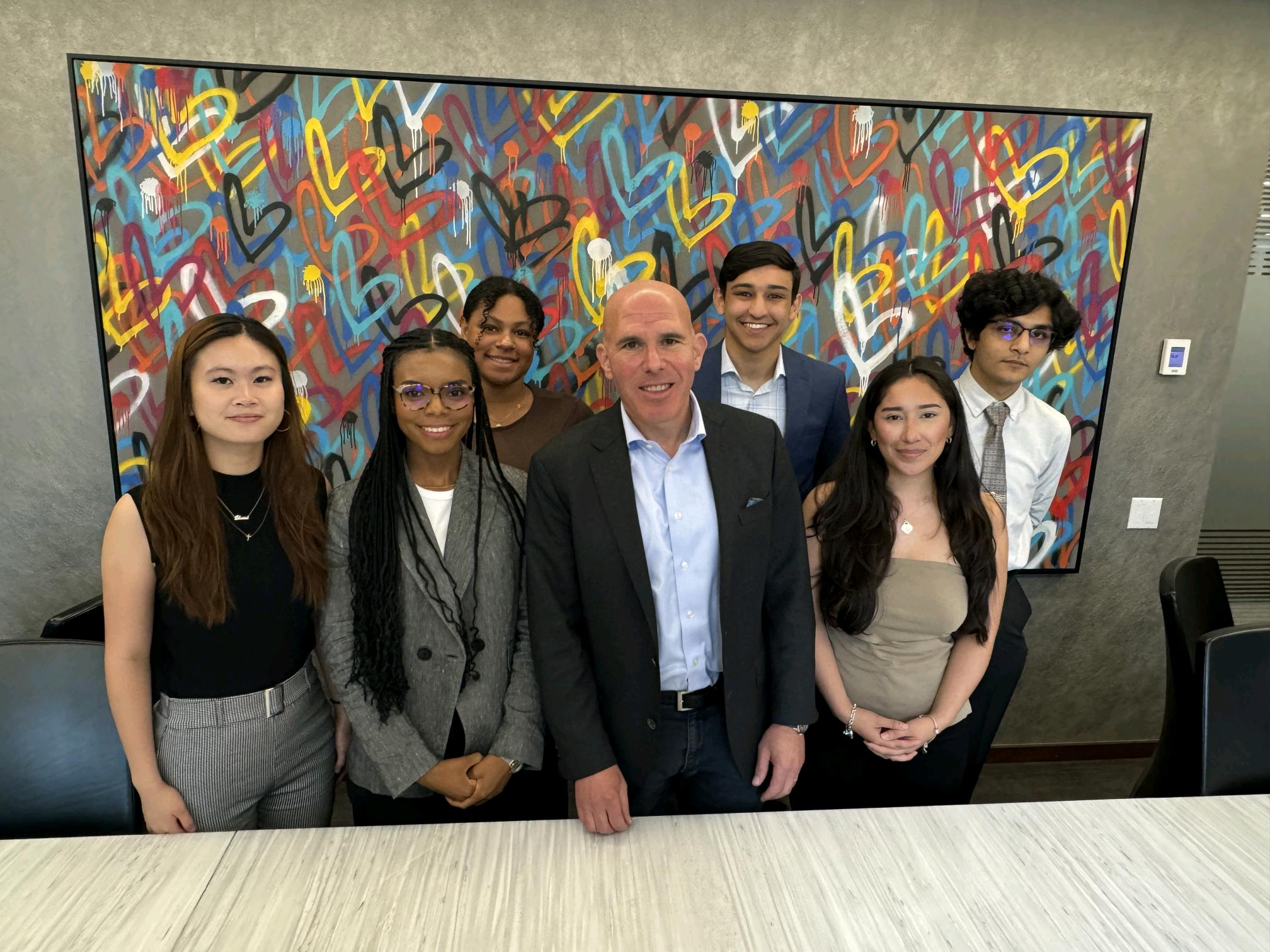
Rechler with scholarship recipients from Hofstra University.

In 2021, Rechler was appointed to the Federal Reserve Bank of New York's Board of Directors and was elected to serve a full term the following year.

== Philanthropy ==
In July 2023, Scott and Debby Rechler donated $10 million to fund research for the use of artificial intelligence at Northwell Health and its Feinstein Institutes for Medical Research to address health disparities and improve medical care.

Rechler is also on the board of the 9/11 Memorial, Drum Major Institute and the Feinstein Institute for Medical Research, is a trustee on the board of Long Island Children's Museum, as well as co-chair of the Tribeca Film Institute board of directors and the Centre for Social Innovation board of directors.

== Personal life ==
He is married to Debby Feldstein, whom he met during college. They have three children.
