= Nicola Vassell =

Jamaican-born American art curator (born 1979)

Nicola Vassell (born 1979) is a Jamaica-born American art dealer, curator, and gallery owner. She is recognized as the first black woman to open an art gallery in the Chelsea Arts District of New York City.

== Early life and education ==
Vassell was born and raised in Jamaica. She moved to New York City in 1996 to work as a model. She studied business and art history at New York University beginning in 2002.

== Career ==
In 2005, Vassell began working as an intern at the Deitch Projects gallery after meeting Jeffery Deitch at the 2004 Armory Show. She became a director at Deitch in 2007, where she developed a close relationship with Kehinde Wiley and worked until its closure in 2010. Vassell then served as a director at Pace Gallery between 2010 and 2012.

In 2014, Vassell started her own contemporary art advisory and curatorial business, Concept NV. Through her firm, she curated a group exhibition, "Black Eye," which featured the work of contemporary black artists, including Derrick Adams, LaToya Ruby Frazier, Simone Leigh, Kerry James Marshall, Toyin Ojih Odutola, and Sanford Biggers. She also curated the artwork that appeared in Empire's second season. Vassell co-curated "Edge of Chaos," an exhibition about feminism and ecology, at the Venice Biennale in 2015. The same year, she co-produced the No Commission Art Fair with Swizz Beatz as well as was appointed the curatorial director of the Dean Collection, a contemporary art collection founded by Beatz and Alicia Keys.

In May 2021, Vassell opened her eponymous gallery on Tenth Avenue in Chelsea. The gallery's inaugural show featured the work of Ming Smith. In November 2023, Vassell announced a partnership with Hauser & Wirth for co-representation of artist Uman and the production of a jointly organized exhibition of her work at Hauser & Wirth London in January 2024.
