= Chelsea Waterside Park =

Public park in Manhattan, New York

- Thomas F. Smith Park
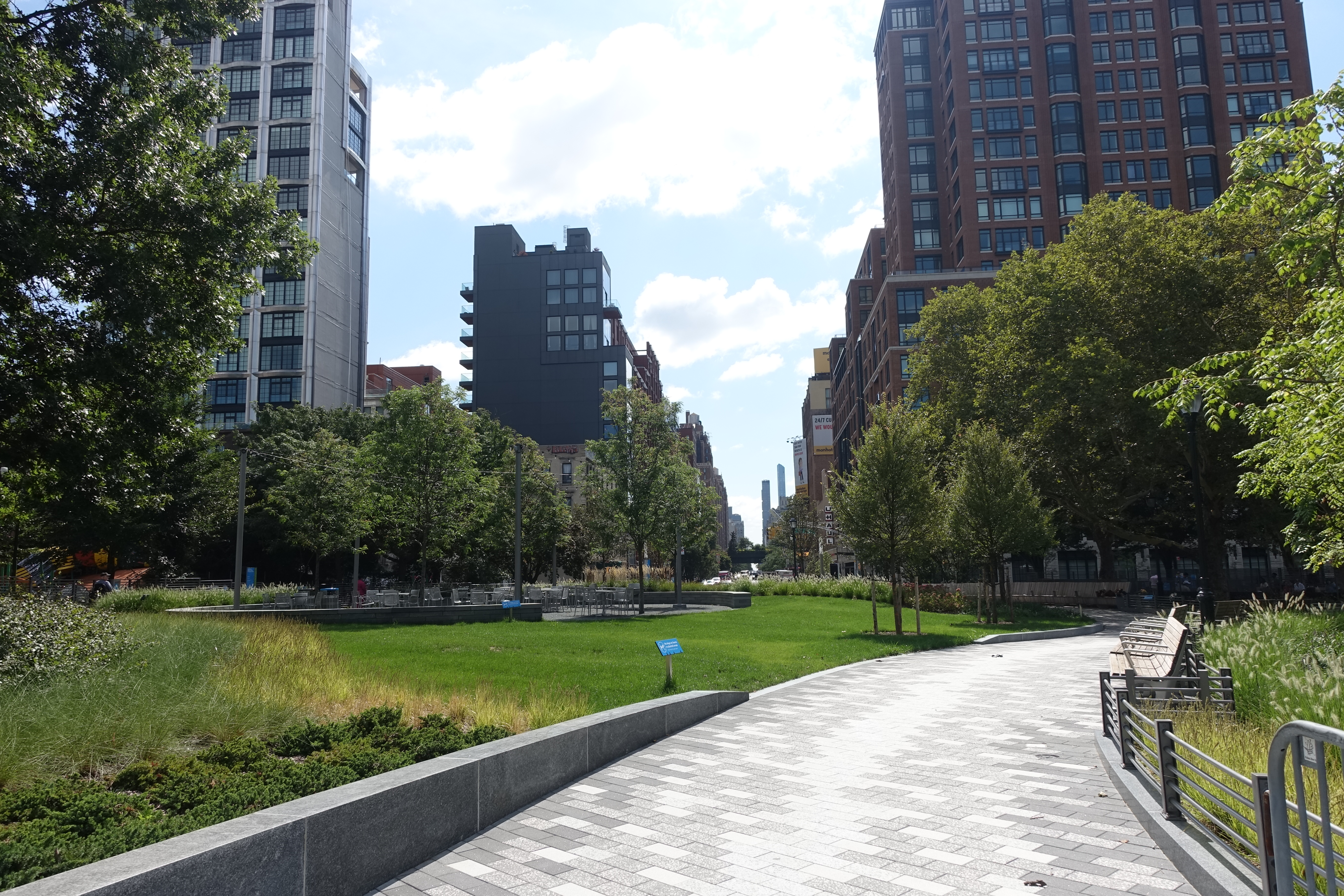
- Chelsea Waterside Park in 2023, following renovations
- Interactive map of Chelsea Waterside Park
- Type: Urban park
- Location: West 23rd Street and 12th Avenue, Chelsea, Manhattan, New York City
- Coordinates: 40°44′58″N 74°00′27″W
- Area: 2.5 acres (1.0 ha)
- Opened: 1906 (Thomas F. Smith Park); 2000 (Chelsea Waterside Park, as part of Hudson River Park)
- Operator: State of New York; City of New York; Hudson River Park Trust
- Status: Open
- Public transit: NYCT Bus: M12, M23 SBS
- Website: www.hudsonriverpark.org

Chelsea Waterside Park, formerly Thomas F. Smith Park, is a public park located at West 23rd Street between 11th and 12th Avenues along the West Side Highway in Chelsea, Manhattan, New York City. It was originally operated by the government of New York City under the New York City Department of Parks and Recreation. As of 2023 it is part of the Chelsea section of Hudson River Park and managed by the Hudson River Park Trust.

The park was originally the site of a small freight yard for the Erie Railroad. In 1906, the railroad redeveloped the site into a park, as part of the reconstruction of the adjacent ferry terminal. In 1915, the park was taken over by the Parks Department, and was named for politician Thomas Francis Smith following his death in 1923. The construction of the West Side Elevated Highway in the early 1930s split the park into two adjacent sections.

Chelsea Waterside Park was designed in the late 1980s by architect Thomas Balsley. Half of the proposed park would be an expansion of the existing Smith Park, and the other half would be developed on the waterfront atop Piers 62, 63 and 64, with the two halves connected by a footbridge. The inland portion of Chelsea Waterside Park was constructed in the 1990s as a part of Hudson River Park during the redevelopment of the West Side Highway, and opened in 2000. The waterfront sections proposed for the park were completed in 2010 under a separate project. Between 2017 and 2023, major renovations took place in Chelsea Waterside Park, with a redesigned playground opening in 2018 and the remaining upgrades completed by 2023.

== Description ==
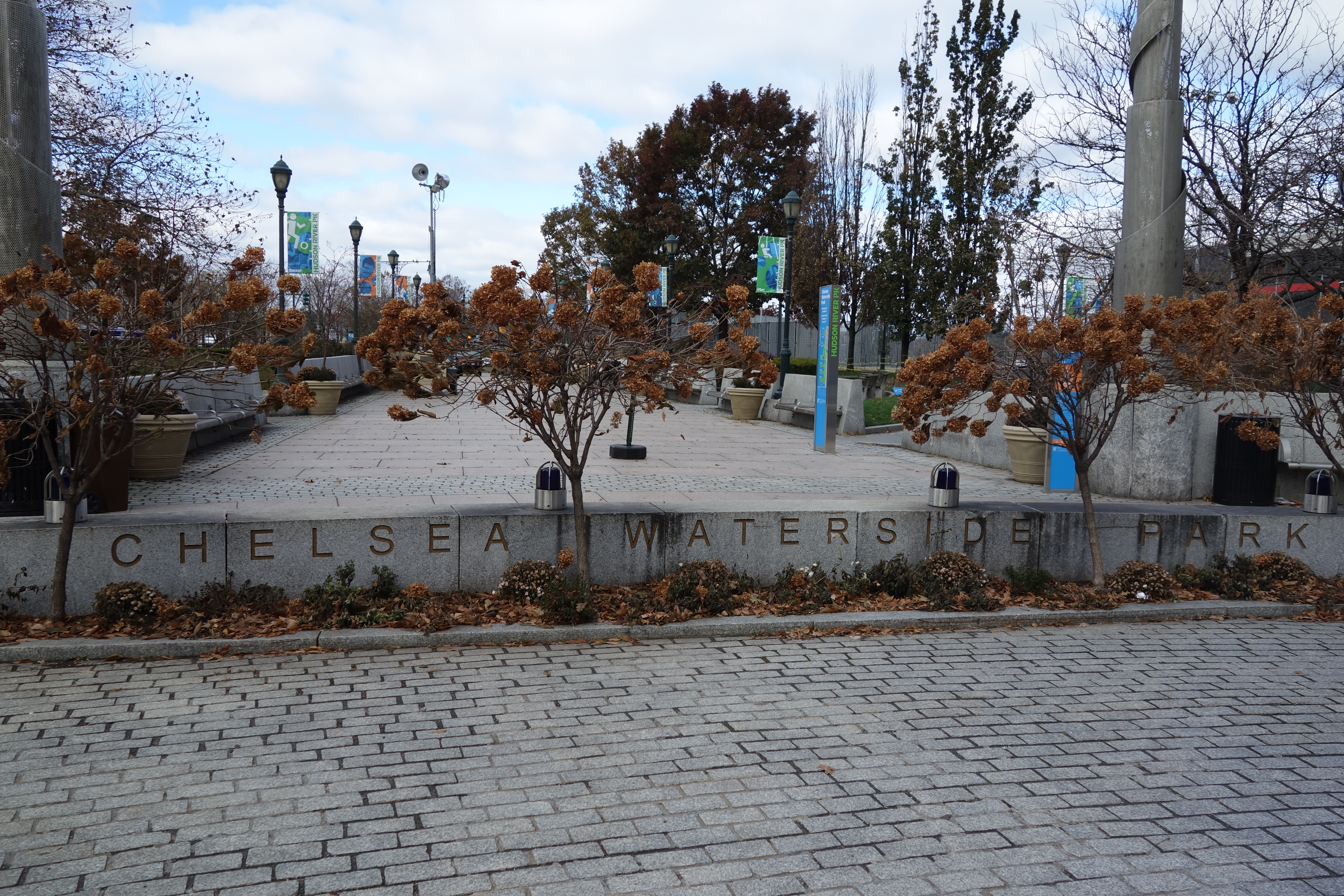
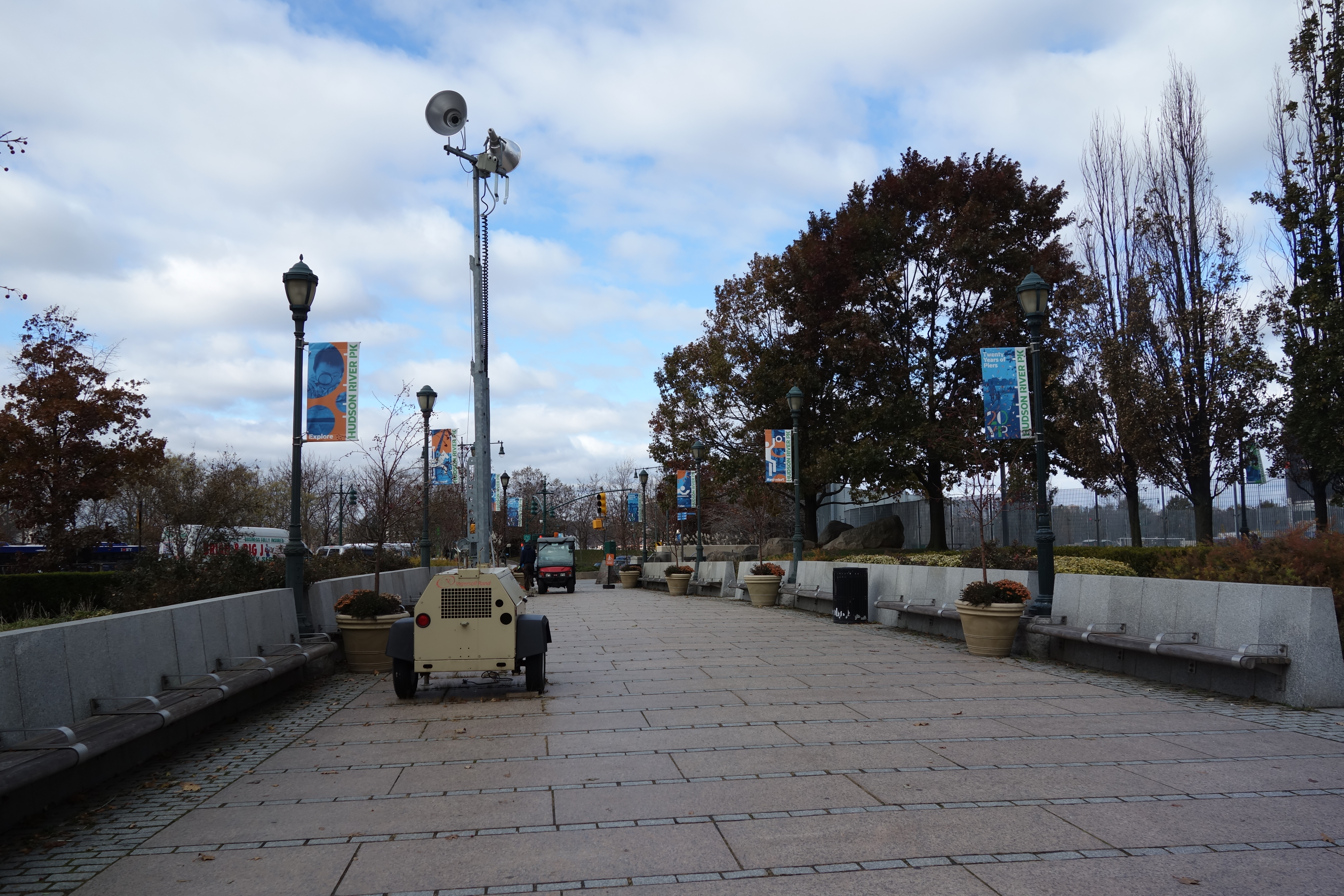
The granite main entrance sign (top) and 23rd Street promenade (bottom) in 2018, prior to renovations.

=== Location ===
Chelsea Waterside Park is located on a triangular two-block long site at the west end of 23rd Street. It is bound to the west by 12th Avenue (West Side Highway), to the east by 11th Avenue, to the south by West 22nd Street, and to the north by West 24th Street. The de-mapped western end of 23rd Street runs through the park as a pedestrian plaza, connecting to the rest of Hudson River Park via a crosswalk. The current park is 2.5 acres (1.0 ha) in size. The portion of the park south of 23rd Street formed the original Thomas F. Smith Park, which had an area of between 0.5 and 2 acres (0.20 and 0.81 ha).

Located to the west of the park is the main right-of-way of Hudson River Park, which runs north-to-south between the West Side Highway and the Hudson River. Immediately across from Chelsea Waterside Park are the Chelsea Piers sports complex, and Piers 62, 63, and 64. Across 24th Street to the north is the United States Postal Service Manhattan Vehicles Maintenance Facility. To the east at 10th Avenue is the High Line. The park is located just south of the West Chelsea Historic District, which includes the landmarked Starrett–Lehigh Building. The park is located in the vicinity of the Chelsea-Elliot Houses and Fulton Houses housing projects, and the Penn South and London Terrace apartment complexes.

=== Features ===
The 2000-built design of Chelsea Waterside Park was created by landscape architect Thomas Balsley during the reconstruction of the West Side Highway in the late 1980s and 1990s. Balsley would later design renovations to Gantry Plaza State Park, Riverside Park South, and the East River Esplanade. The park was reconstructed between 2017 and 2023, with Phase I of the renovations designed by Michael Van Valkenburgh Associates, and Phase II designed by the Abel Bainnson Butz (ABB) and CDR Studio Architects firms. As designed by Balsley, Chelsea Waterside Park contains walls and benches constructed of granite in order to resemble 19th-century coastal bulkheads, a reference to the area's historical use as a marine port.

The pedestrian plaza along 23rd Street was originally constructed as a straight-path promenade between 11th and 12th Avenues, intended as a gateway to the main Hudson River Park along the river. The Phase II renovations by ABB reimagined the promenade as the "central area", replacing the straight path with two curved paths surrounding a central lawn. Within the lawn is a picnic area with "festive lights" hanging above for nighttime use. In Balsley's initial 1980s park plans, a landscaped or terraced footbridge called a "platform park" would have run above the highway from the pedestrian plaza towards the shorefront sections of Hudson River Park.

At the north end of the park are an artificial turf athletic field used for soccer and other sports, and a basketball court. The turf field measures 32 yards (29 m) by 60 yards (55 m). Both the athletic field and the basketball court have lights for nighttime use. Next to the athletic field at the northwest corner of the park is a smaller elevated sitting area known as the "sunset overlook".

At the south end of the park is the dog run. As built in 2000, it was 3,500 square feet (330 m^{2}) in size. It features an asphalt surface designed to remain at low temperature, a drinking stream, and three or four 3-foot (0.91 m) tall mounds and a 24-foot (7.3 m) long "fallen tree" sculpture for dogs to interact with. The dog run was named "Best of New York" by New York Magazine in May 2005. The Phase II renovations enlarged the dog run to 7,400 square feet (690 m^{2}), splitting it into "small dogs" and "large dogs" sections. The original Thomas F. Smith Park also featured a dog run.

As constructed in 2000, the park contained portable toilets in lieu of a comfort station. The Phase II renovations added a comfort station along the central area, doubling as a gatehouse into the athletic field. Designed by CDR Studio Architects, the building's facade utilizes granite and wood salvaged from the park's original walls and benches. Solar panels were also installed atop the roof of the building. The comfort station was placed as such to connect with the sewer line running underneath 23rd Street.

==== Play Area ====
At the northeast corner of the park is its playground, called the Chelsea Waterside Play Area. The playground is 17,000 square feet (1,600 m^{2}) in size. From October 2017 to August 2018, the play area underwent an 11-month $3.4 million renovation, designed by the Michael Van Valkenburgh Associates and MONSTRUM firms. The Michael Van Valkenburgh firm also redesigned the nearby Piers 62, 63, and 64, as well as Brooklyn Bridge Park. In its current iteration, the playground's central feature is the "Pipefish Tower" created by MONSTRUM. It consists of a multi-colored 64-foot (20 m) long pipefish-shaped climbing feature, surrounding a large slide rising 22 feet (6.7 m) high. The pipefish is one of the aquatic species native to the Hudson River. The pipefish sculpture is constructed of Robinia wood, and consists of a seahorse's head and a serpent's body. The slide's towers, meanwhile, are designed to resemble tree trunks. At the north end of the playground is a small splash pad called the "water maze", featuring several sprinklers. A toddler water play area is situated at the southeast corner of the play area. At the southwest corner is the "Mussel Houses", a sandbox featuring mussel or oyster-shaped sculptures. At the northwest corner of the playground is a "Donor Recognition Wall", featuring the names of major benefactors to the park's renovation.

The Phase II renovations to the park added a stroller parking area at the south end of the playground.

==== Cattle sculptures ====
Located in the play area integrated with its sprinklers are two limestone sculptures of cattle heads. The sculptures were originally architectural features of the New York Butchers' Dressed Meat Company building, a Neo-Renaissance-style slaughterhouse in Hell's Kitchen. The building was demolished in 1991, after which the sculptures were preserved by the New York City Landmarks Preservation Commission. The two cow sculptures along with two sculptures of ram's heads, were purchased by the Hudson River Park Trust at auction in 2012. The cattle sculptures were added to the park during the 2018 renovations (the ram sculptures were given to DeWitt Clinton Park in Hell's Kitchen).

In addition to the cattle sculptures, Art Deco ornamental features of the former West Side Elevated Highway are also integrated into the playground as sprinklers. These are wing-shaped and made of granite. The highway formerly ran through the original Thomas F. Smith Park. Seating furniture, meanwhile, was created from the former granite arch of Pier 54, also part of Hudson River Park.

==== Thomas F. Smith Monument ====
One of the features retained from the original Thomas F. Smith Park is a 7-foot (2.1 m) granite monument to Smith, located on 23rd Street at the eastern entrance to the park. It's inscription reads "In Memory Of Hon. Thomas F. Smith, Born 1863−Died 1923, Erected by the Seymour Club of Chelsea Neighborhood". The Horatio Seymour Democratic Club, also called the Seymour Tammany Club, was a Tammany Hall political club headquartered in Chelsea. Similar monuments also erected by the Seymour Club are featured in nearby Chelsea Park.

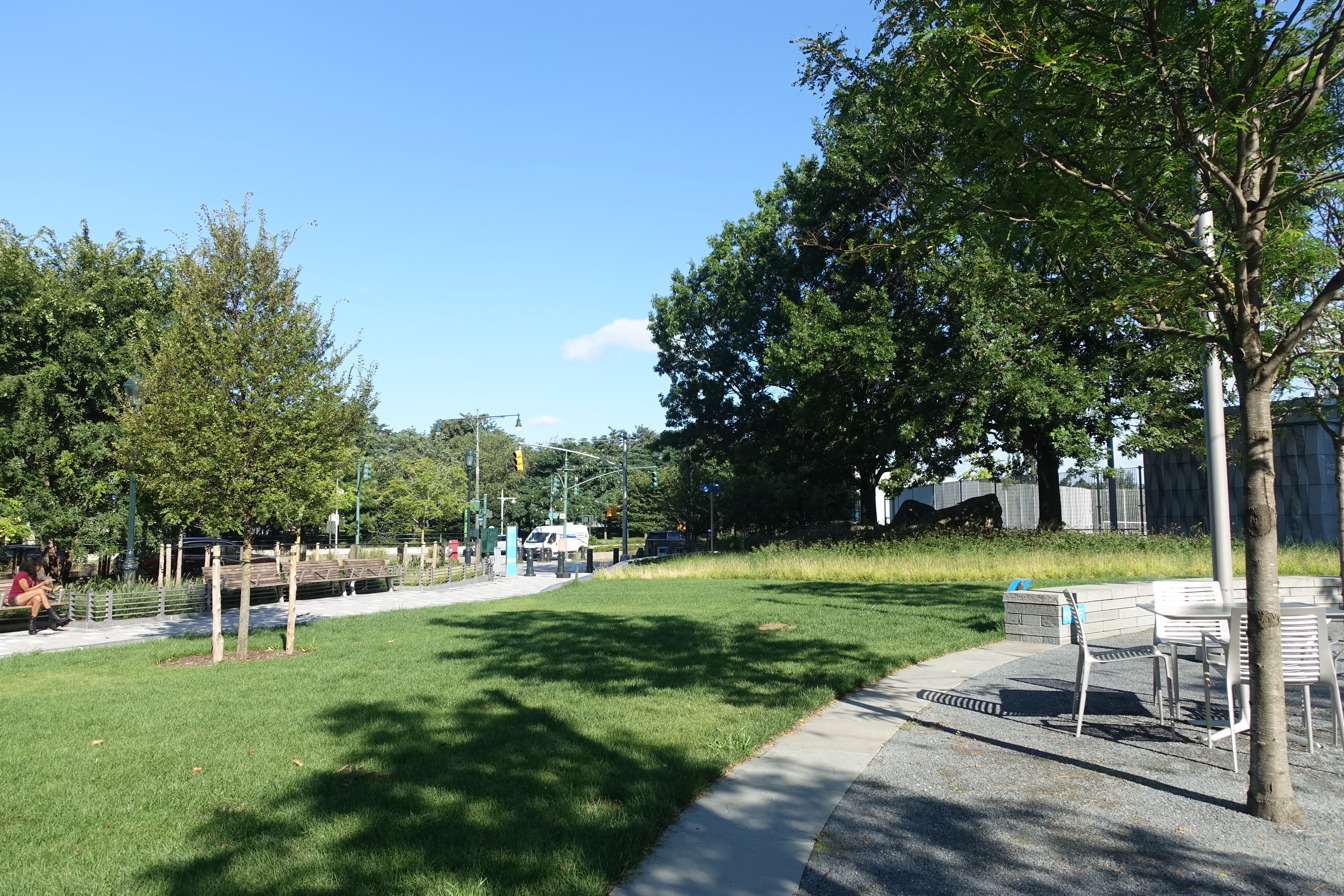
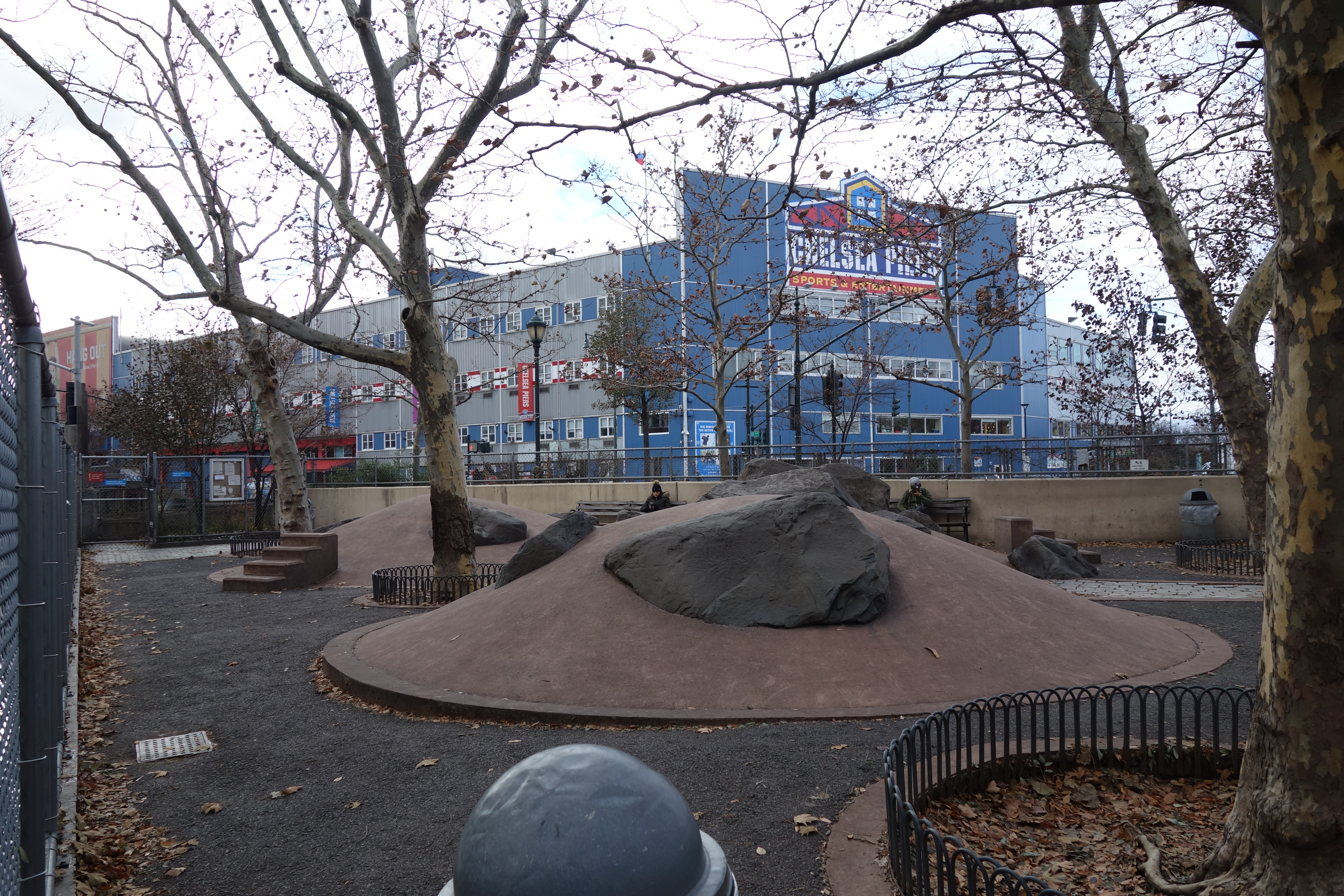
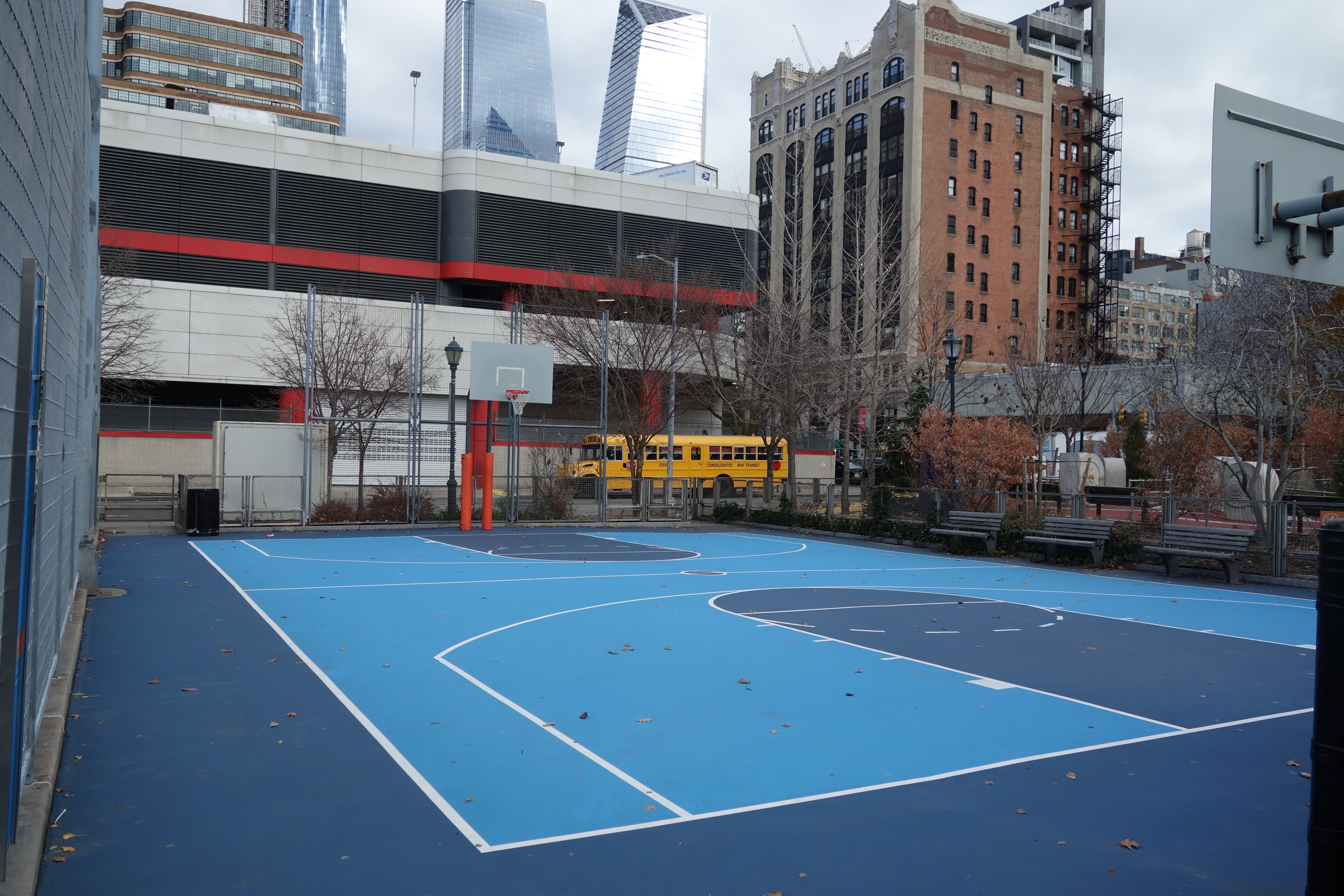
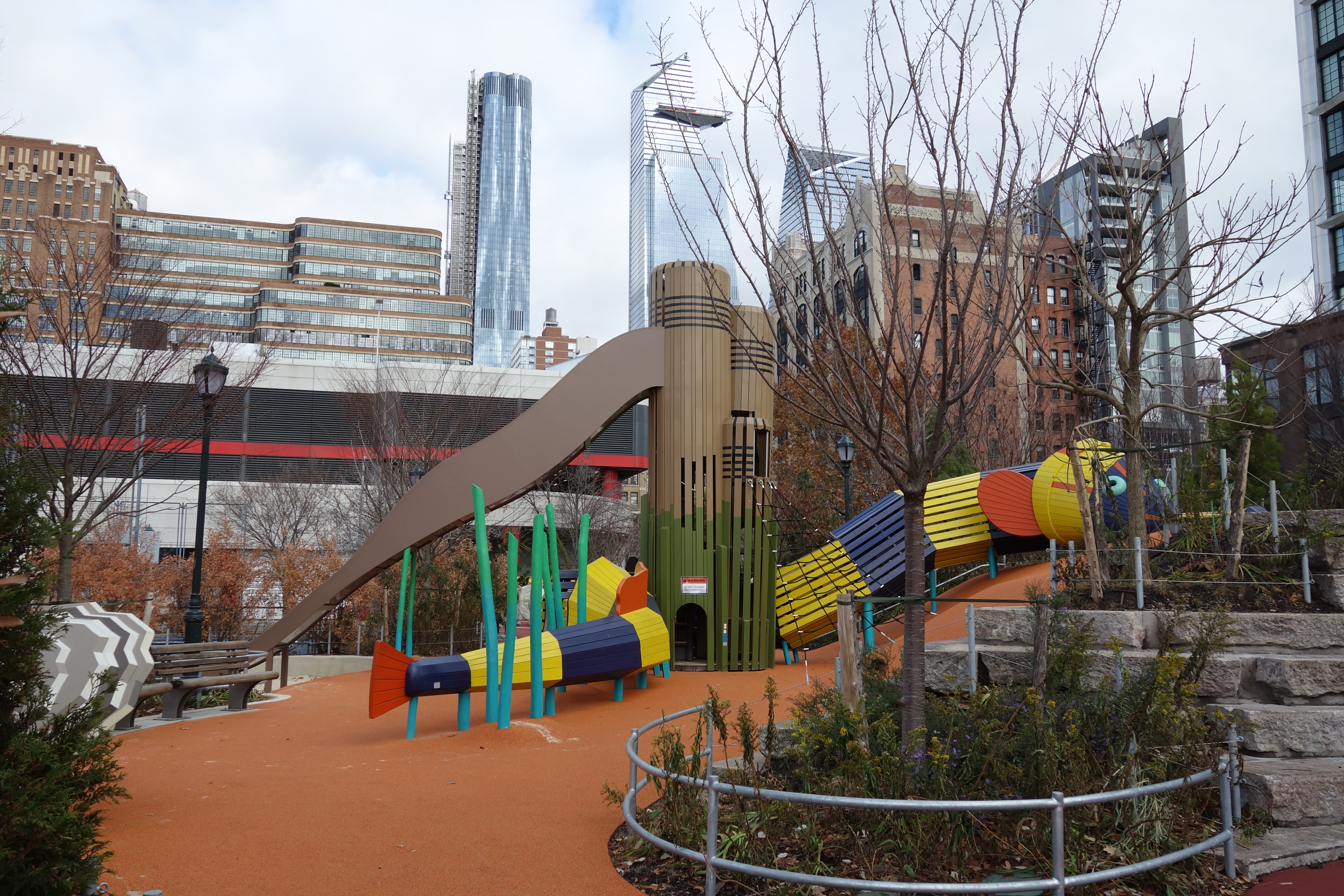
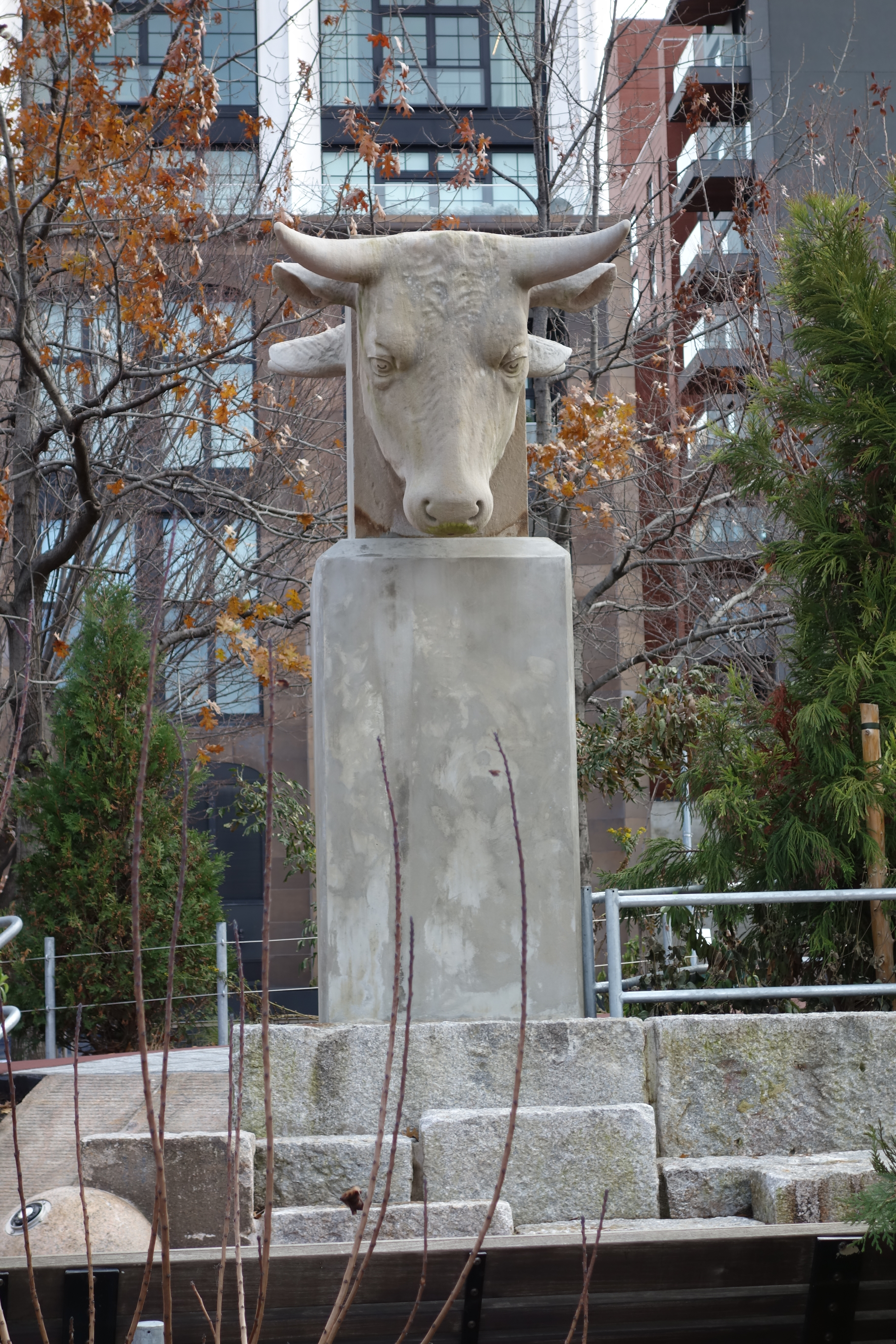
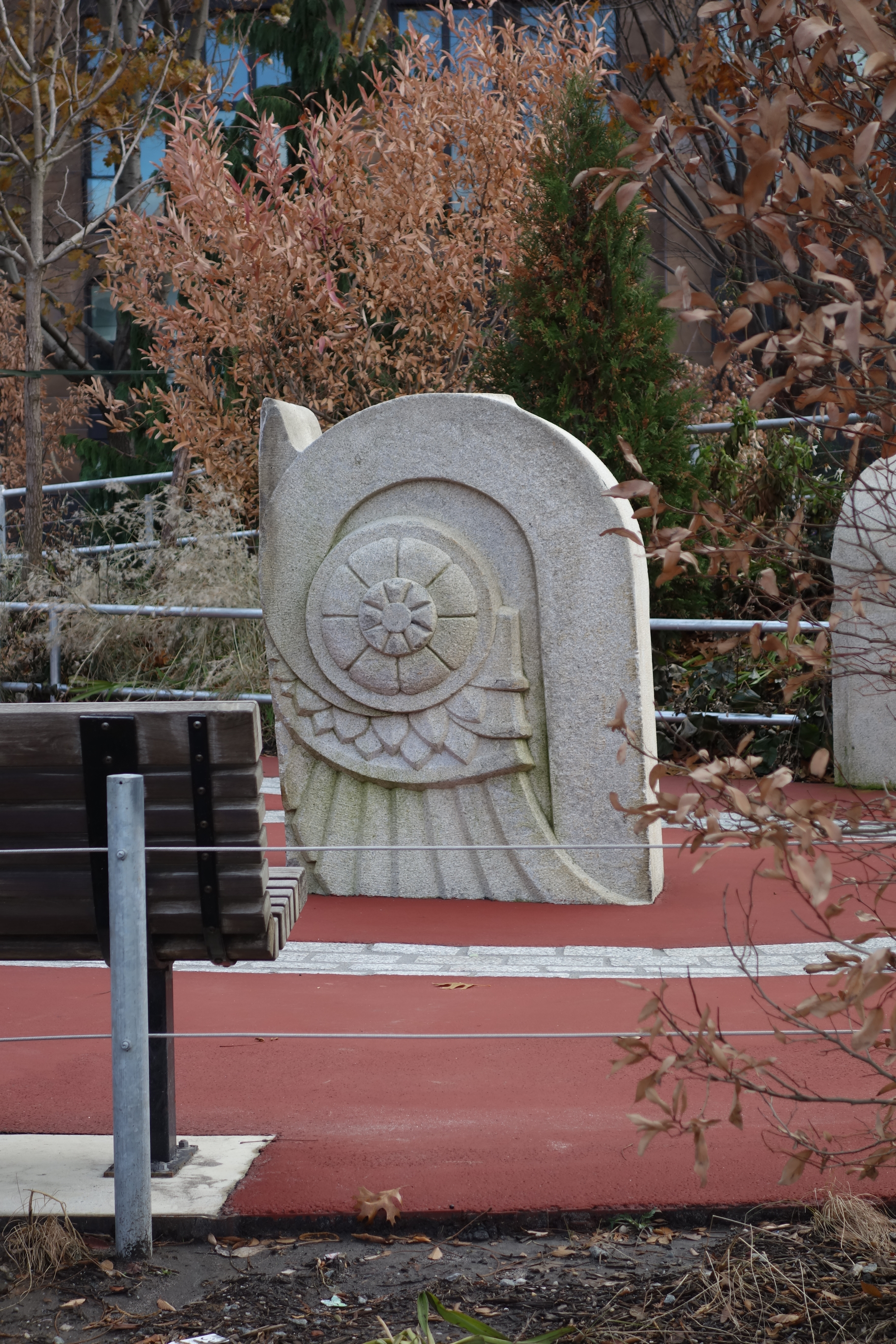
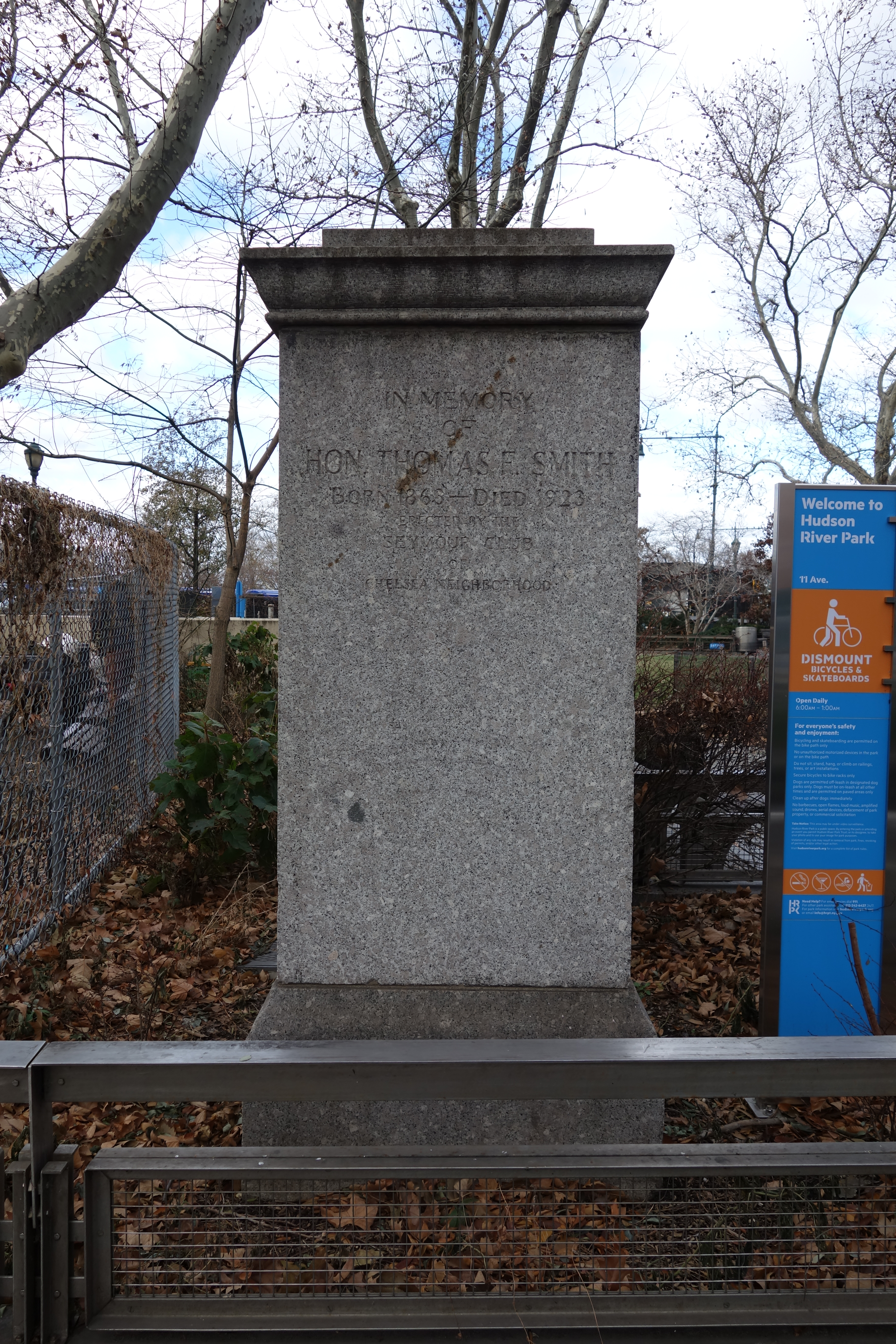
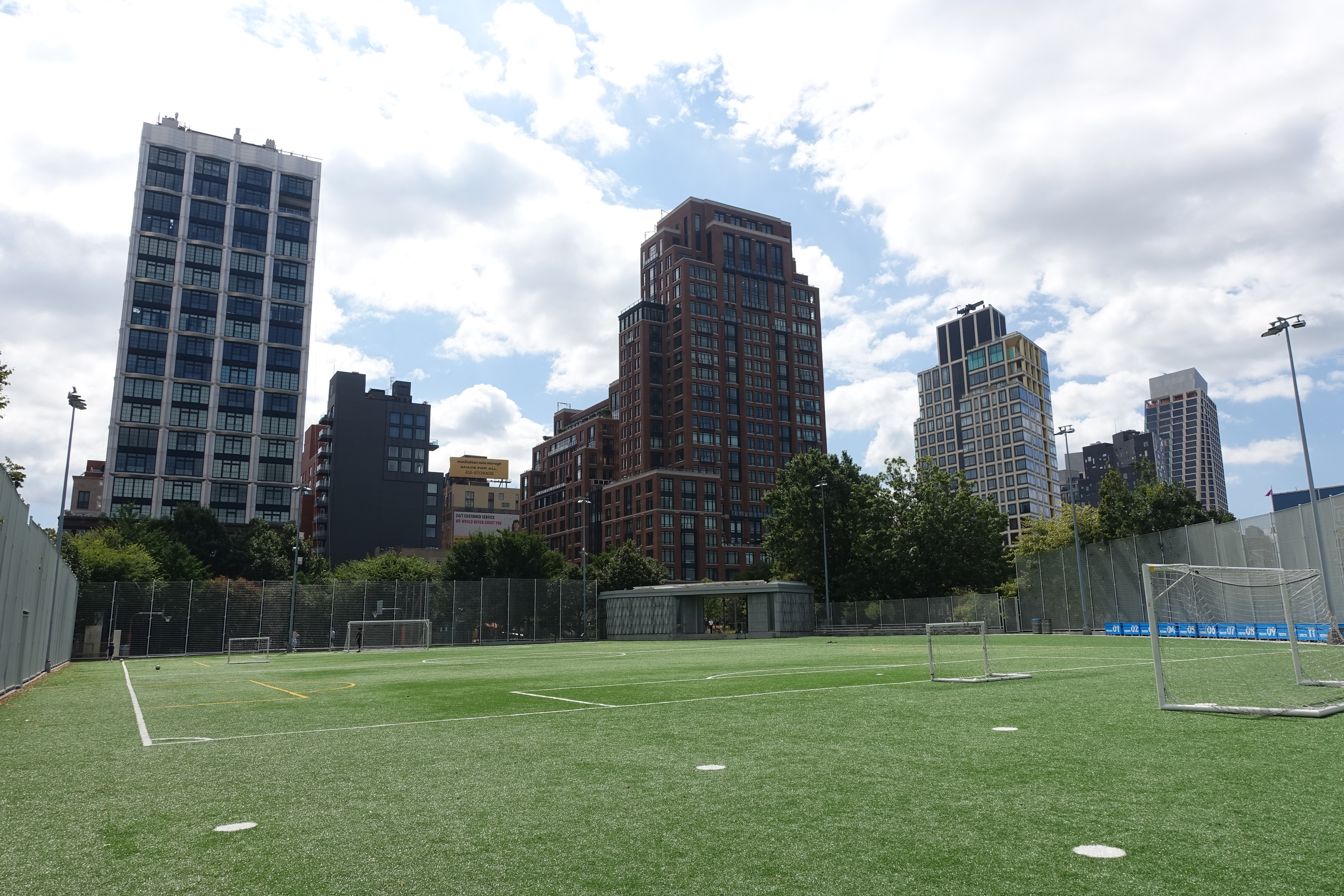
Left to right: The Central Area, dog run, basketball court, Pipefish Tower, cattle sculptures, sprinklers, Thomas F. Smith Monument, turf athletic field.

=== Transportation ===
The park is directly served by the M12 local bus route and the M23 Select Bus Service route. The M12 operates between Abingdon Square Park and Columbus Circle along 11th and 12th Avenues. The M23 SBS operates crosstown along 23rd Street, with its western terminus at Chelsea Piers across from Chelsea Waterside Park. The closest New York City Subway station is the 23rd Street station on the IND Eighth Avenue Line, served by the C and E trains.

== History ==
=== Use as a freight yard and creation of the park ===
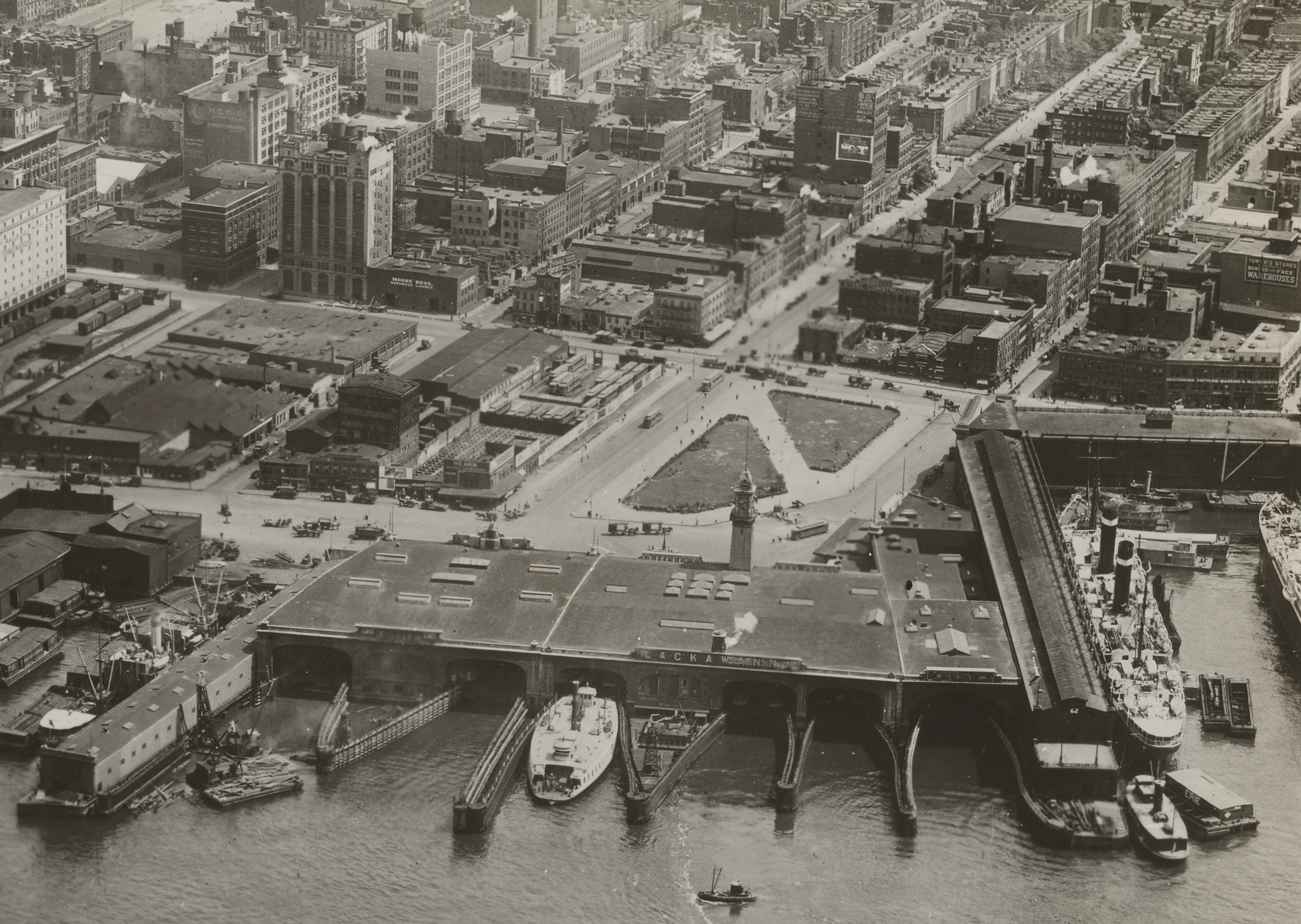
The Erie Railroad ferry terminal (foreground) and Thomas F. Smith Park at West 23rd Street.

In May 1868, the Erie Railroad began operating the Pavonia Ferry route between the 23rd Street ferry pier on the Hudson River, at the west end of 23rd Street, and Jersey City. In 1893 the company, now operating as the New York, Lake Erie & Western, constructed a car float bridge on the south side of the ferry terminal. They also created a small freight yard on the block across from the terminal, between 22nd and 23rd Streets and between 11th and 12th Avenues. The dimensions of the rail yard were 380 feet (120 m) by 200 feet (61 m). As the turn of the century approached, the railroad considered expanding the yard to the next block east, in order to accommodate newer and larger boxcars. In April 1901, the Erie Railroad purchased a site for a new freight yard between 28th and 29th Streets, across from the existing yard of the Lehigh Valley Railroad. In 1902, the company began negotiations with the city to develop a new freight yard on this property. The new freight yard, known as the 28th Street Freight House, was opened on September 1, 1904, after which the yard at 23rd Street was abandoned.

Meanwhile, the Pennsylvania Railroad also opened a ferry terminal located between 23rd and 24th Streets in 1897, while the Delaware, Lackawanna and Western Railroad and the Central Railroad of New Jersey opened adjacent terminals around 1905. In 1906, the original Erie ferry terminal was demolished and a new ferry house was constructed. As part of the project, a park was constructed on the former Erie freight yard; this was the predecessor to Thomas F. Smith Park. The park was used as a common plaza for all the ferry terminals in the area as well as Chelsea Piers.

The park was acquired by the New York City Department of Docks in 1907. By 1911, the New York City Department of Parks and Recreation maintained the park, which remained under the Department of Docks' jurisdiction. The site was transferred from the Department of Docks to the Parks Department in 1915, along with eight "recreation piers". On April 11, 1923, then-city Public Secretary Thomas Francis Smith was struck and killed by a taxicab. Shortly afterwards, the New York City Board of Aldermen named the parkland after Smith. The parks amenities at the time consisted of benches and trees.

The West Side Elevated Highway, also known as the Miller Highway, was completed from Canal Street to the foot of Smith Park at 23rd Street in late 1930. In 1932, construction began on an extension of the highway between 22nd Street and 38th Street. This section of the highway opened on January 5, 1933. The highway formed an "S"-curve at 23rd Street, where the right-of-way shifted west from 11th Avenue onto 12th Avenue. Because of this, Thomas F. Smith Park was split diagonally into two triangular sections by the highway trestle. The space underneath the elevated highway, meanwhile, was used for parking and storage.

During the construction of the highway, the Twenty-third Street Association petitioned Manhattan Borough President Samuel Levy to build a replacement for Thomas F. Smith Park. On October 15, 1931, Levy promised that a new West Side park would be created to replace Smith Park. Thomas F. Smith Park was officially dedicated and opened on June 26, 1936. At the time, the value of the property was assessed at $1,000,000. In December 1936, the Parks Department proposed renovations to the park, which would add recreational facilities. These new facilities would include benches, water fountains, swings, horseshoe pits, handball courts, and shuffleboard courts, along with new landscaping work. An underpass would be constructed in order to connect the two separate halves of the park. Only a portion of the proposed upgrades were implemented.

From 1951 until 1975, the southern section of the park was used by the United States Bureau of Customs for a large customs scale. Between 1970 and August 1973, the park was closed and used as storage space for the construction of the West Side interceptor sewer. Afterwards, the sewer construction firm renovated the park, which reopened in early 1974. At this time, the park was primarily used by workers in the industrial areas along the Chelsea waterfront.

=== Closure of the Miller Highway and Westway project ===
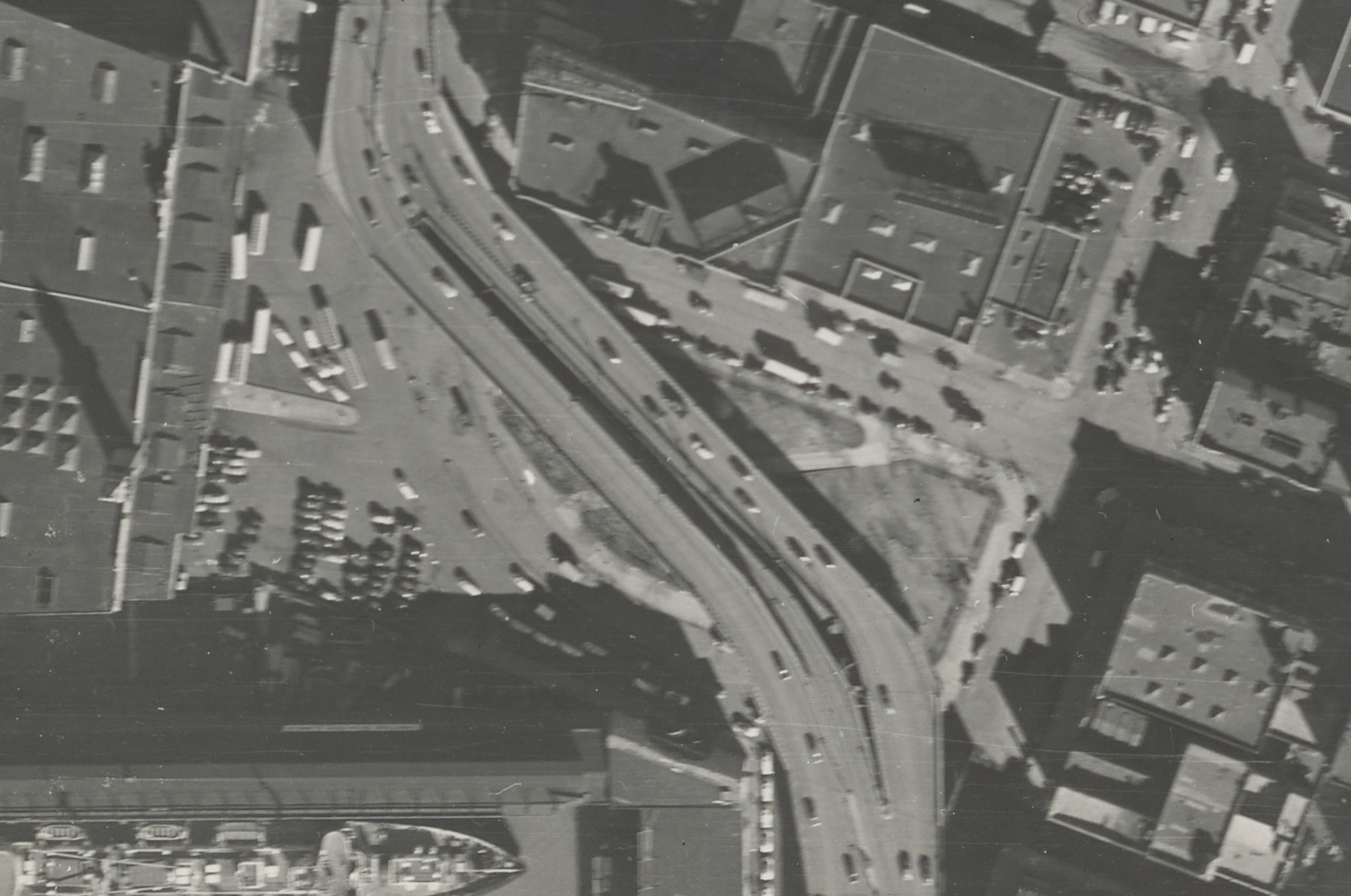
The West Side Elevated Highway crossing Thomas F. Smith Park in 1949.

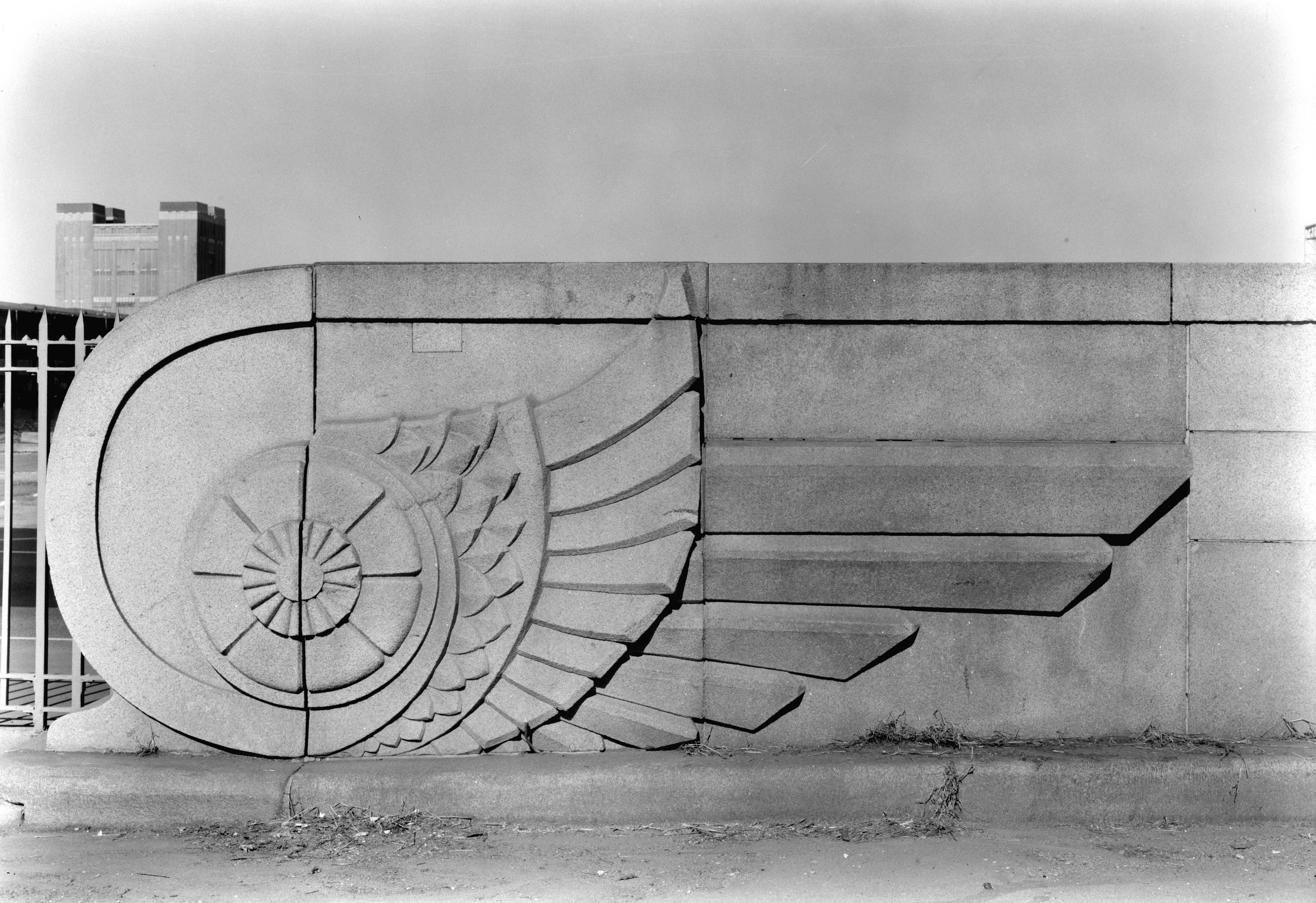
One of the original winged decorations of the elevated highway at Canal Street in 1974.

On December 15, 1973, a section of the West Side Elevated Highway at Gansevoort Street south of 14th Street collapsed under the weight of a dump truck, which was carrying asphalt for repairs to the highway. At the time, much of the highway was in disrepair and considered unsafe; in particular, the S-curve at 23rd Street was deemed dangerous. Afterwards, in January 1974 the highway was closed between Battery Park and 46th Street. That year, the federal government and the New York State Department of Transportation (NYSDOT) released a study known as the West Side Highway Project to explore replacement options for the highway.

As a result of the study, in April 1974 the City of New York announced the Westway plan, which would construct a new six-lane underground highway (Interstate 478) along the west side of Manhattan between the Brooklyn-Battery Tunnel and the Lincoln Tunnel. The existing Hudson River piers would be demolished and the right-of-way would be landfilled, with the highway tunnel placed within the new land. The inland West Side Highway route (Route 9A, a.k.a. West Street and 12th Avenue) would be redeveloped as a four-to-six lane surface boulevard. This was a revised version of the "Outboard Alternative" in the West Side Highway Project study. The Westway plan evolved from the 1971 "Wateredge Study" by the state Urban Development Corporation, which sought to build the new Interstate along the Hudson River coastline, either atop pilings above the river, at grade, or in a tunnel. As part of the Westway plan, 92.96 acres (37.62 ha) of continuous parkland known as Westway State Park would be created along the Hudson River above the proposed highway tunnel, which would serve the increasing residential population in the area. The conversion of the West Side Highway into a surface boulevard would further improve pedestrian access to the waterfront.

The outboard Westway plan was approved by the Federal Highway Administration on July 26, 1977. The West Side Highway Project included plans for a "community-oriented park" at the site of Thomas F. Smith Park at 23rd Street. The 1977 plan would create this new park atop the landfill on the Hudson River shore, 5.63 acres (2.28 ha) in size, while the existing structures at Chelsea Piers would be demolished. The elevated highway trestle would be removed from the existing Smith Park to restore it as one continuous site. The Westway project was abandoned in 1985 due to political opposition and environmental issues, including concerns over the striped bass population in the Hudson River.

=== Creation of current park ===
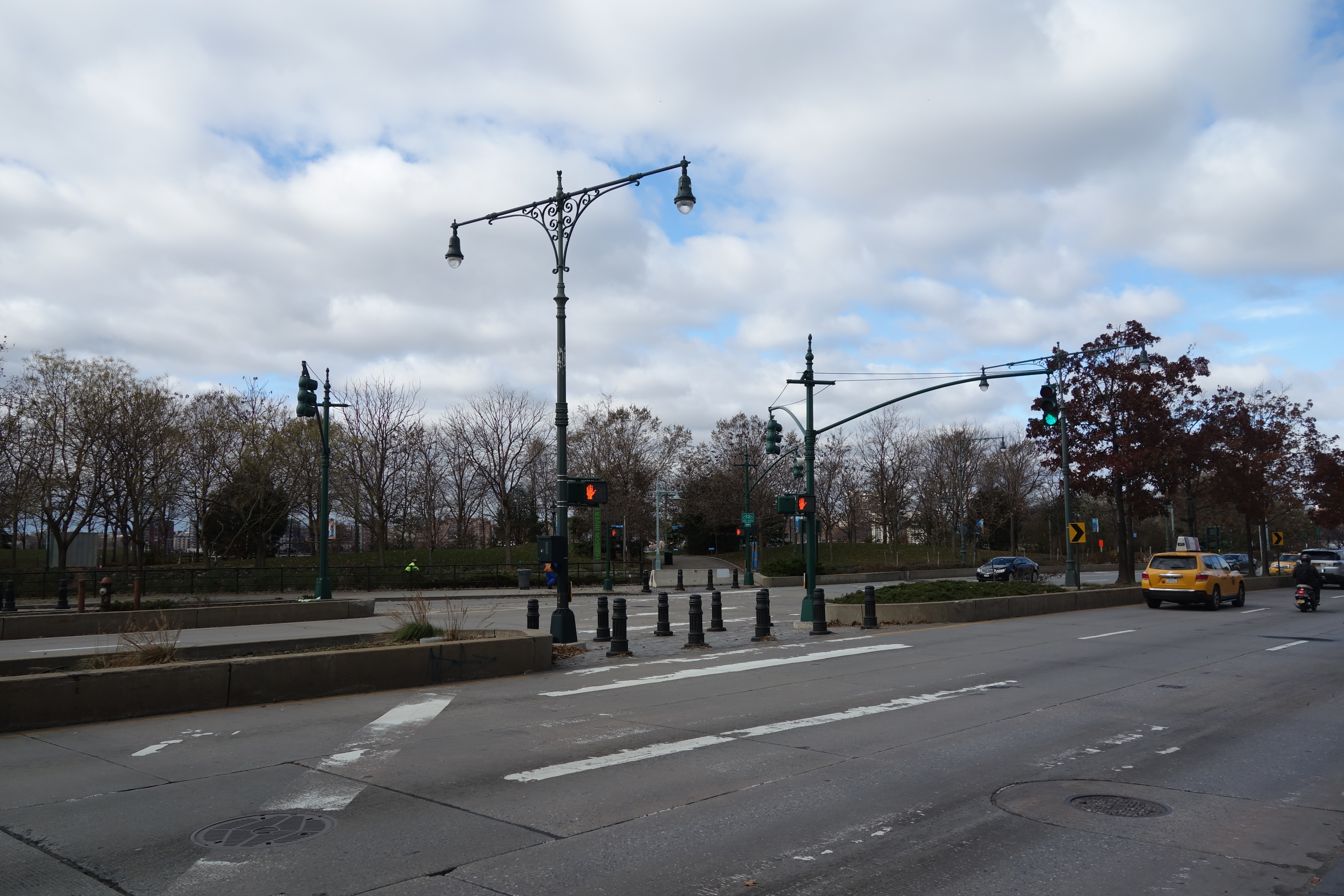
A footbridge was originally proposed to connect Chelsea Waterside with the rest of Hudson River Park (background).

After the collapse of the elevated highway, beginning in 1977 the trestle was demolished. The remaining grade-level West Side Highway continued to travel through Smith Park. The park property was ceded to the NYSDOT on February 9, 1982, in preparation for the construction of the Westway.

The Chelsea Waterside Park Association was founded in 1985. Following the cancellation of the Westway plan, in February 1986 the association launched a campaign to create additional parkland in the neighborhood. The association proposed a two-block long park along the Hudson River between 22nd and 24th Streets. That year, the association contracted landscape architect Thomas Balsley to create the design for a new stretch of waterfront park along the new West Side Highway, similar to that proposed under the Westway project. Balsley and the association proposed a new park at 23rd Street, on the site of the existing Thomas F. Smith Park. The park would extend north to 24th Street, and west to the Hudson River shoreline. A pedestrian bridge over the new West Side Highway called a "platform park" would connect the inland park to the shoreline and Piers 62, 63, and 64.

In 1986, then-Governor Mario Cuomo created the West Side Task Force, a 22-person panel to propose and evaluate redevelopment plans for the West Side Highway. Members of the panel included future New York City Mayor David Dinkins, and businessman Arthur Levitt. In January 1987, the panel recommended a six-lane boulevard, and a waterfront park to be constructed integrating some of the existing piers. At the time, the park was to extend from Battery Park to 42nd Street. Within the proposal was a plan to straighten the curve of the road at 23rd Street. This would require the demolition of a portion of Thomas F. Smith Park, while a replacement park would be constructed.

On May 25, 1988, a memorandum between then-Governor Cuomo and then-Mayor Ed Koch established the West Side Waterfront Panel, which was tasked to create plans for the development of the West Side Highway right-of-way and the adjacent Hudson River coastline. In fall 1990, the panel released a report recommending the creation of the Hudson River Waterfront Park, a 270-acre (110 ha) park which would stretch from Battery Park north to 59th Street. The park would include a 4-mile (6.4 km) long landscaped esplanade featuring a cycleway and pedestrian walkway along the riverfront. The Chelsea-Gansevoort section of the park would be anchored by a reconstructed Thomas F. Smith Park, which would be converted into a recreation hub known as Chelsea Waterside Park based on Thomas Balsley and the Chelsea Waterside Association's design. The 8-acre (3.2 ha) park would stretch between 22nd and 24th Streets, and extend west to the river occupying Piers 62, 63, and 64. The western or waterfront section of Chelsea Waterside Park would facilitate primarily passive recreation with grassy areas, trees, and seating, along with a jogging track. Piers 62 and 64 would be converted into public facilities for waterfront views. A lawn acting as an "informal amphitheatre" would be created on Pier 63. A playground and community garden would be established at the east end of Pier 64 at West 24th Street. The eastern or inland section of the park would be used for active recreation with a softball field and numerous tennis and handball courts, similar to its current design. The west end of 23rd Street would be de-mapped and converted into a pedestrian mall running through the park, with a monument or fountain to be placed at both ends of the strip within the park. Unlike the original plan for the park, there would be no pedestrian bridge connecting the inland and waterfront sections, requiring people to cross the new West Side Highway at-grade. The waterfront panel described the proposed Chelsea Waterside Park as "The largest and most active recreation area in the Hudson River Waterfront Park".

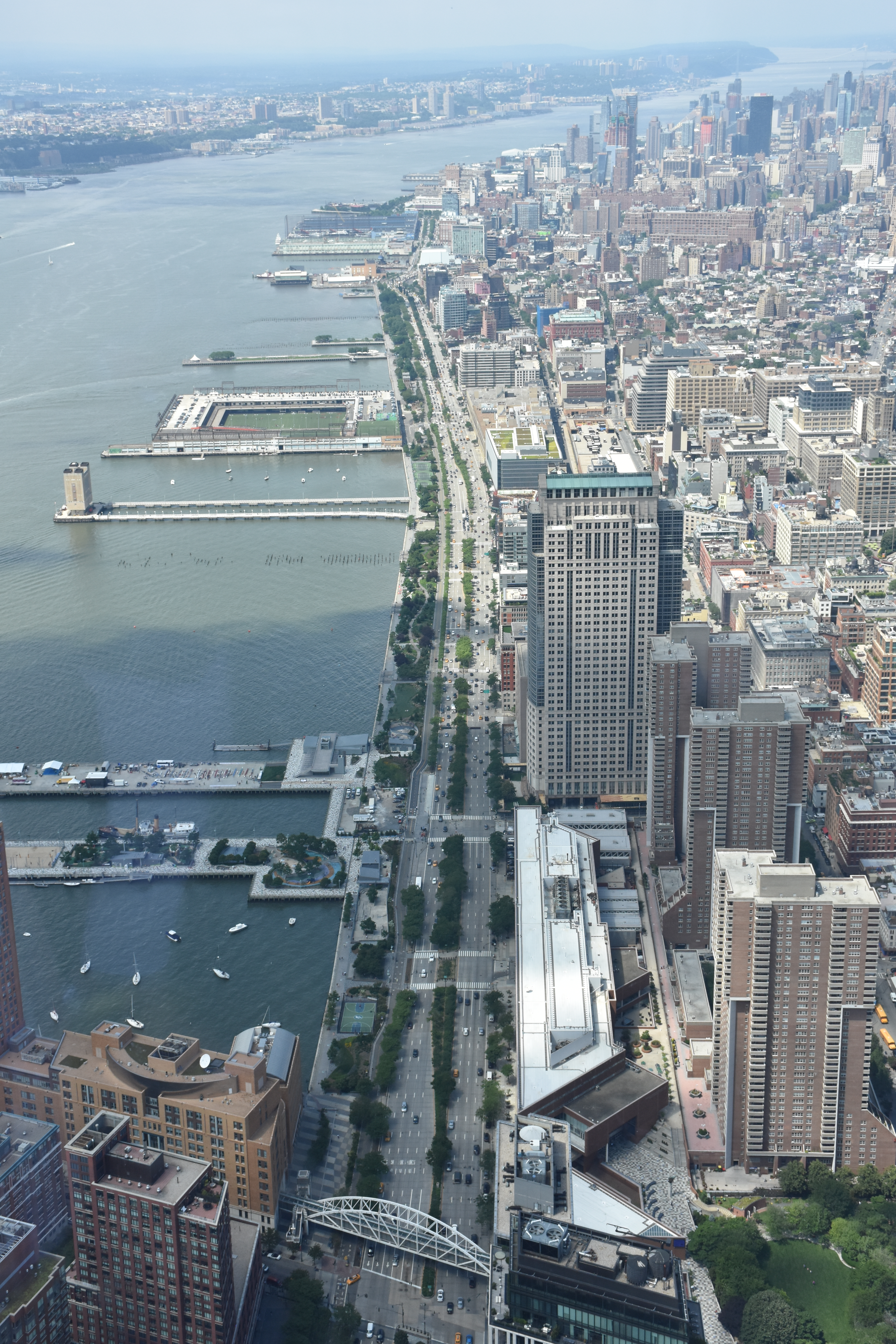
Chelsea Waterside and the rest of Hudson River Park were created during the redevelopment of the West Side Highway (pictured).

The Chelsea-Gansevoort section of Hudson River Park would also feature a redeveloped Chelsea Piers. The plan also proposed a "Chelsea-Convention Center Park", a grassy park on the shoreline between 30th and 34th Streets, which would support the nearby Jacob K. Javits Center and a mixed-use development to be built above the West Side Yard. The total Hudson River Waterfront Park project was expected to cost $500 million, with the reconstruction of Smith Park and the cost of the bicycle and pedestrian paths estimated to cost $65 million. At the time, the project had $265 million in committed funding. $100 million would be provided by the state through the 21st Century Environmental Quality Bond Act, which was proposed by Governor Cuomo. This act would spend $1.9 billion on the development and preservation of parkland, and on closing landfills and promoting recycling. $100 million for the park would come from New York City, earmarked by now-Mayor David Dinkins. An additional $65 million would be provided by federal highway funds for the construction of the shoreline walkway and bikeway, and the conversion of Smith Park into Chelsea Waterside Park. The combined costs of the Hudson River Park project and the reconstruction of the West Side Highway was expected to reach $1.2 billion.

In August 1990, Thomas F. Smith Park was described as "a trapezoidal open space". Its features included London plane trees, benches, a fountain, gaming tables, and the monument to Smith. The southern and western section of the park featured a parking lot, and an adjacent bus loop used by M23 crosstown buses. The larger northern and eastern section measured 0.42 acres (0.17 ha) in size, while the smaller southern and western section occupied 0.69 acres (0.28 ha). Outside of the gaming tables and the few benches, the park featured no recreational facilities or seating areas. The block north of the park, meanwhile, was occupied by a one-story building used by trucking companies, and an exotic car repair shop.

Under the 1992 plan for the West Side Highway, the S-curve of the highway at 23rd Street would be straightened. The reconfiguration of the West Side Highway at 23rd Street would require the demolition of the southern section of Thomas F. Smith Park. Because of this, in June 1995/1996 the federal government and NYSDOT agreed to expand the park as part of the project. The new park would be extended north to 24th Street, with the stretch of 23rd Street running through the new park converted into a pedestrian zone. This plan deviated from the Hudson River Park Trust's original plans for Chelsea Waterside Park. In addition, the portions of the park west of the highway were no longer part of the Chelsea Waterside plans. At this time, Pier 62 was occupied by roller rinks and an inline skating course operated by the Chelsea Piers sports complex, intended only for an "interim" period of time. Meanwhile, Pier 63's warehouse was used as a restaurant, roller rink, and for sports courts, also intended to be temporary.

Beginning in 1993, the Chelsea Waterside Park Association utilized Pier 62 as an interim recreation space, hosting music performances. The first construction for Hudson River Park, on the cycle lanes of the Hudson River Greenway between Canal Street and 14th Street, began in early 1998. At this time, construction on the expansion of Thomas F. Smith Park was expected to begin that spring. The Hudson River Park Act was passed by the New York State Legislature in June 1998, and signed by Governor George Pataki in September 1998. Under the terms of the act, the rebuilt Smith Park was to have been only half of the 8-acre (3.2 ha) Chelsea Waterside Park. The other half, located on the river shore on the west side of the highway, would have included Piers 62, 63 (to be demolished), and 64.

=== Opening ===
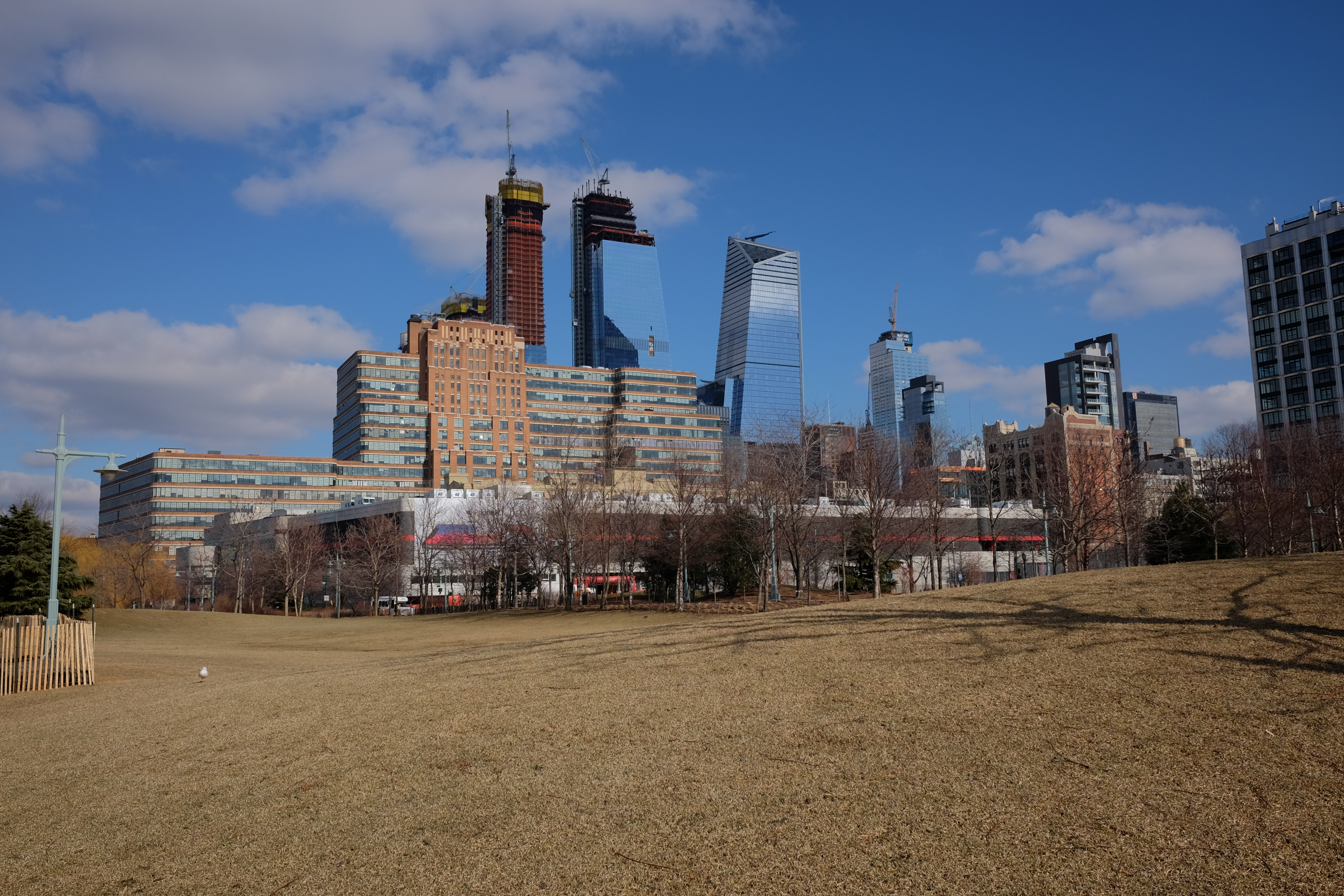
Sections of Hudson River Park west of 12th Avenue including the Pier 63 Lawn Bowl (pictured), were originally planned as part of Chelsea Waterside Park.

Work on the inland section of Chelsea Waterside Park, atop the former Smith Park, began in July 1998 with the demolition of buildings for the park expansion north of 23rd Street. Park construction began in September 1998, with the western stretch of 23rd Street closed to traffic in February 1999. The inland park was opened on October 12, 2000, at the cost of $8.5 million. Upon opening, the park was proclaimed as "Chelsea's grand portal to its waterfront" by New York State officials. The park's features at its opening were the sports field, dog run, and the splash pad portion of the playground. Construction of the main playground within the park, however, did not commence due to lack of funding.

Thomas Balsley's design for the water playground received criticism for its ornamental sprinklers, which some local residents felt resembled "phallic" objects or sex toys. The design had been intended to resemble chess pieces. According to Balsley, his design was inspired by a park in Osaka, Japan, while a less provocative design resembling eggs had been rejected. The three mounds that characterize the dog run were also criticized, with dog owners claiming the mounds were too large. In 2004, Chelsea Waterside Park received the American Society of Landscape Architects Merit Award.

In May 2005, the park's main playground was opened. The play area was designed as an "interactive" and "access for all" playground, with "Galaxy Class" equipment produced by Danish firm Kompen. The playground was intended to accommodate children of all ages, and those with disabilities. On October 28, 2009, the Hudson River Park Trust announced that the park received a $500,000 grant earmarked by New York City Council Speaker Christine Quinn, in order to resurface its turf playing field and add fencing around the field.

The waterfront parkland and piers originally planned as part of Chelsea Waterside would be developed for Hudson River Park under a separate project known as "Chelsea Cove", designed by Michael Van Valkenburgh Associates. Pier 64 was opened in April 2009. Pier 62 and Pier 63 were opened on May 17, 2010, with the entire Chelsea Cove project estimated to cost $73 million. Pier 63 includes the Chelsea Lawn Bowl, originally envisioned as the "informal amphitheater" in the Chelsea Waterside project.

=== Renovations ===
==== Phase I ====
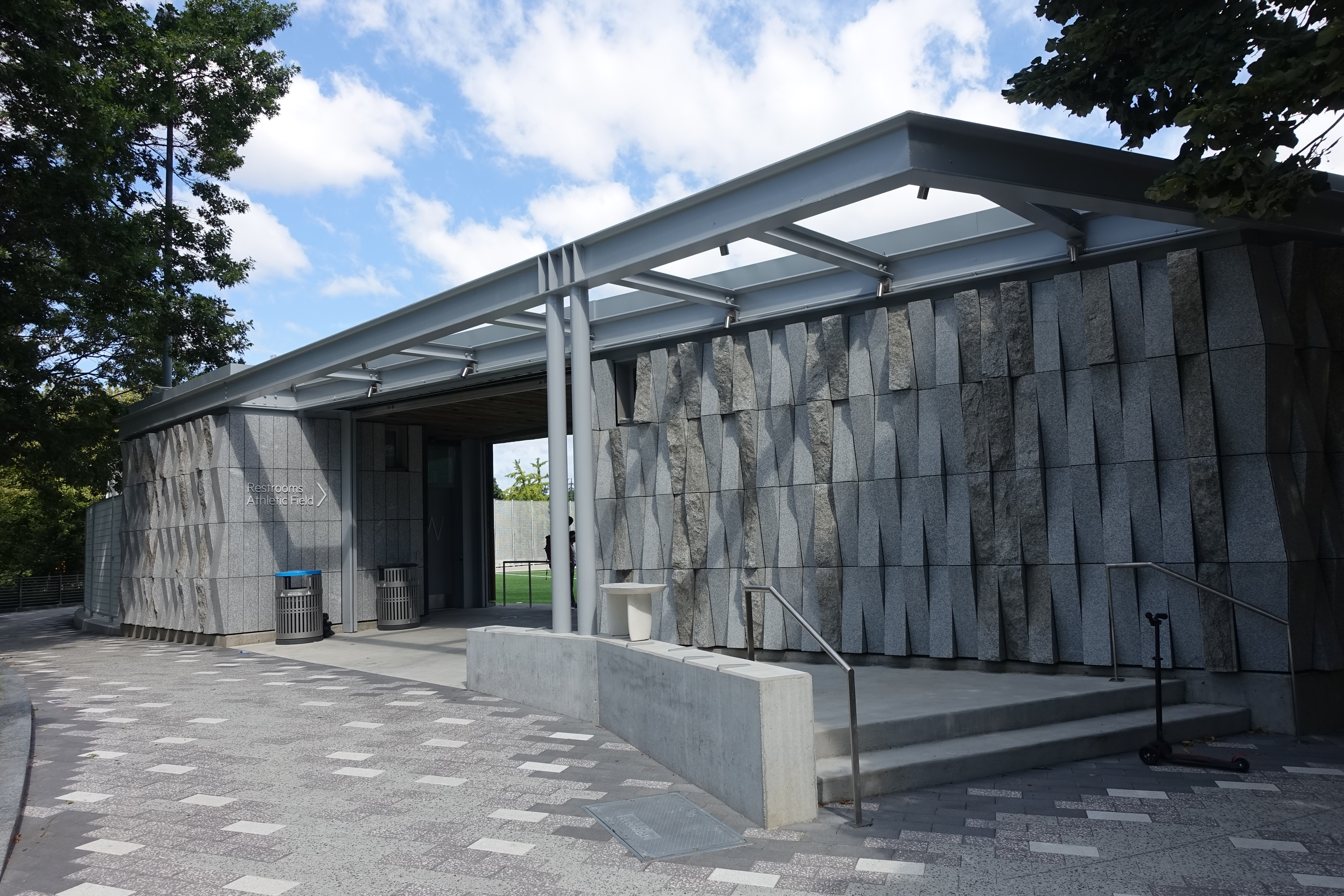
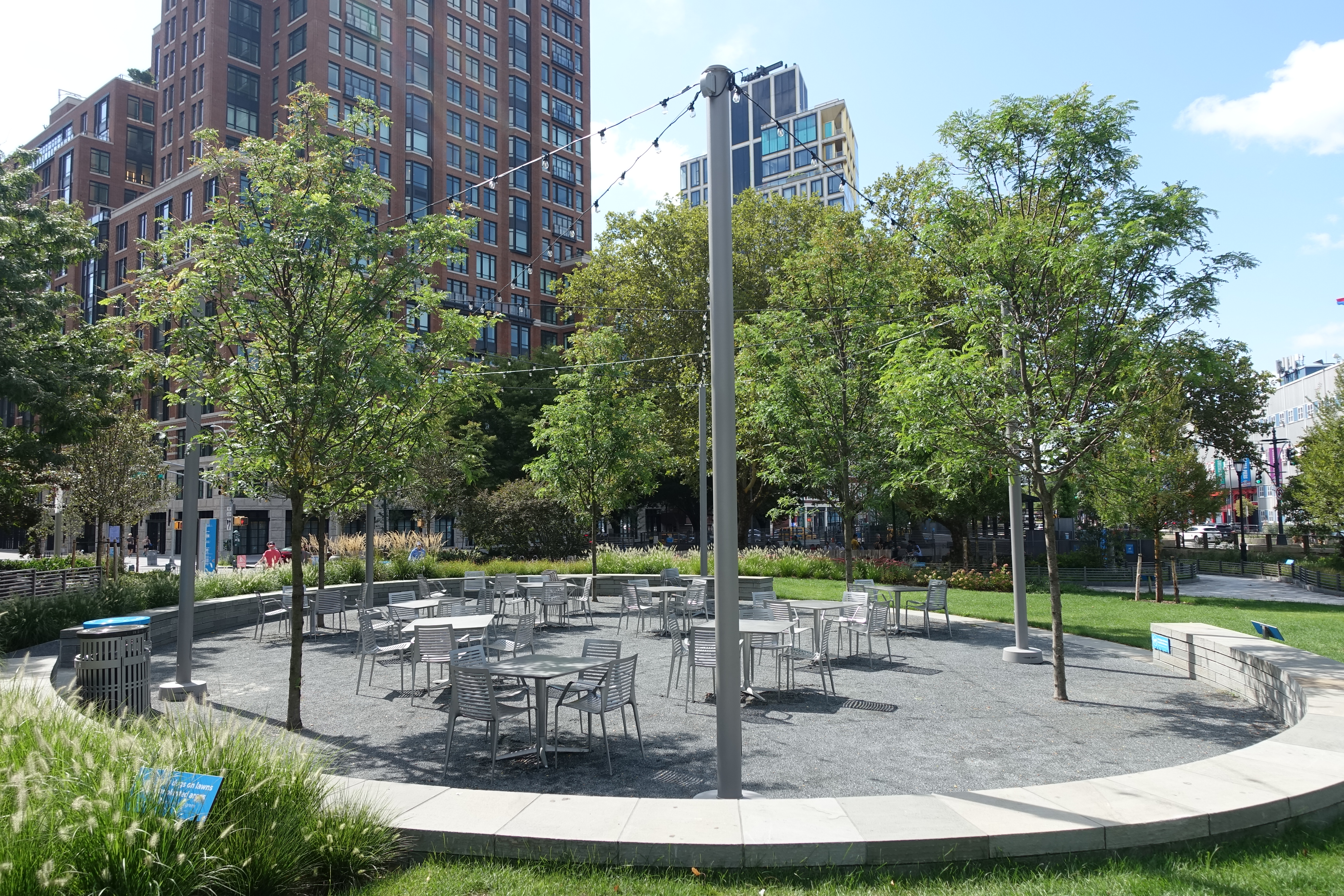
The park's comfort station (top) and picnic area (bottom) were constructed during the 2023 renovations.

On December 10, 2015, during a meeting of Manhattan Community Board 4, members of the Friends of Hudson River Park Playground Committee proposed a major renovation of the Chelsea Waterfront Play Area. The playground had been plagued by dilapidated equipment, and suffered drainage issues due to only one drain serving the playground. At the time, the project was estimated to cost $1.5 million, which would be raised through a capital campaign. The initial plans for the new playground were overseen by Mathews Nielsen Landscape Architects, who had helped prepare the original Hudson River Park master plan in 1997.

On November 10, 2016, at a meeting of Community Board 4, the Hudson River Park Trust presented finalized designs for the new play area as part of Phase I of the redevelopment of Chelsea Waterside Park. This design was created by Michael Van Valkenburgh Associates. The new design would incorporate the preserved sculptures from the New York Butchers' Dressed Meat Company slaughterhouse, the West Side Highway Art Deco reliefs, and granite stones from the Pier 54 arch.

Ground was broken on the new playground on October 3, 2017. In attendance were Manhattan Borough President Gale Brewer and New York State Assemblyman Richard N. Gottfried. By the end of 2017, $2.5 million had been raised for the park project through the capital campaign. The play area was reopened August 14, 2018, having cost $3.4 million. The final cost had increased from initial estimates in order to finance the Pipefish Tower. The alternative design for the feature would have been an eel surrounding a fire hydrant.

==== Phase II ====
In November 2019, the Abel Bainnson Butz (ABB) architectural firm presented preliminary designs for Phase II of the park renovations to Manhattan Community Board 4, and received feedback for the plan from the community. The firm had previously designed Piers 45, 46, and 51 within Hudson River Park. The central promenade would be redesigned with new "meandering" paths and the lawn and picnic area, to replace the existing "dominant and oversized pedestrian thoroughfare". The original granite walls of the park would also be removed, based on community input. The changes were intended to increase greenspace and reduce paved areas, making the park more welcoming to parkgoers instead of just acting as a route to the rest of Hudson River Park. The turf athletic field would be resurfaced for a second time, the dog run would be expanded, and a comfort station would be constructed, a longstanding issue with the park. The underused overlook at the northwest corner of the park would be eliminated, with the space integrated into the athletic field.

A groundbreaking ceremony for the project was held on December 3, 2021, with groundbreaking for the comfort station held on December 6. During the project, nearly the entire park was closed except for the play area and basketball court. The park reopened on June 15, 2023. The total cost of the Phase II renovations was $15.2 million, with $9 million spent by the Hudson River Park trust, and additional funding from the City Council and the Manhattan Borough President.
