= Jack Shainman Gallery =

Art gallery in Manhattan, New York

Coordinates: 40.746356°N 74.006250°W

Jack Shainman Gallery is a contemporary art gallery in New York City. The gallery was founded by Jack Shainman and his then-partner Claude Simard (1956—2014) in 1984 in Washington, D.C. The gallery has a focus on artists from Africa, East Asia, and North America.

== History ==
In 1986, the gallery moved to New York to open a gallery in the East Village, followed by a move to Soho. From 1997, it was headquartered in the Chelsea gallery district. In 2014, the gallery opened a 2,800 m^{2} (30,000 sq ft) exhibition space called The School in Kinderhook, New York.

In 2022, the gallery announced plans to open a 1,900 m^{2} (20,000 sq ft) space, designed by Shainman's niece Gloria Vega Martín, in the historic Clock Tower Building at 108 Leonard. The space soft opened at with a solo exhibition by Richard Mosse in January 2024, and officially opened as the gallery's flagship location in January 2025 with an inaugural solo exhibition by Nick Cave.

== Artists ==
The gallery represents numerous living artists, including:

- Nina Chanel Abney
- El Anatsui
- Shimon Attie
- Radcliffe Bailey
- Diedrick Brackens
- Yoan Capote
- Nick Cave (since 2005)
- Geoffrey Chadsey
- Gehard Demetz
- Pierre Dorion
- Hayv Kahraman
- Anton Kannemeyer
- Jesse Krimes
- Deborah Luster
- Kerry James Marshall
- Meleko Mokgosi
- Richard Mosse
- Adi Nes
- Jackie Nickerson
- Toyin Ojih Odutola
- Garnett Puett
- Claudette Schreuders
- Malick Sidibé
- Rose B. Simpson (since 2021)
- Paul Anthony Smith
- Becky Suss
- Hank Willis Thomas
- Carlos Vega
- Leslie Wayne
- Lynette Yiadom-Boakye

In addition, the gallery manages various artist estates, including:

- Emanoel Araújo (since 2023)
- Barkley L. Hendricks
- Gordon Parks
- Faith Ringgold
- Michael Snow

The gallery has in the past worked with the following:

- Enrique Martinez Celaya
- Vibha Galhotra
- Kay Hassan
- Brad Kahlhamer
- Tallur L.N.
- Odili Donald Odita
- Susana Solano
- Carrie Mae Weems (2008–2023)
