= Jackie Nickerson =

American-born British documentary photographer

Jackie Nickerson is an American-born British documentary photographer who works in fashion and fine art photography. Born in Boston in 1960, Nickerson has a conceptual practice based on years-long research of the histories and environments of her subjects, and processes that impact them. She explores the identities of her subjects and the effects of working in specific environments.

== Work ==
Series by Nickerson include Farm (2002), Faith (2007), Terrain (2013), Field Test (2020) and Salvage (2021).

=== Farm ===
Farm (2002) presents Nickerson's photographs of farm laborers in Zimbabwe, Malawi, Mozambique and South Africa, made between 1997 and 2000. Her subjects are dressed in clothes they made themselves; the series concerns personal identity through expression and improvisation. Farm was Nickerson's first body of work and was published as a book by Jonathan Cape, London, in 2002.

=== Faith ===
Faith (2007) is Nickerson's depiction of Irish Catholic monastic life in churches, convents and abbeys, combining portraits with the documentation of daily rituals and communal devotion. She photographed nuns and priests in their communities, as well as architectural details including corridors, libraries, kitchens and dining rooms. Nickerson emphasizes the austere vocational life of her sitters, not the mysteries of faith itself; she has stated: “These are individuals and communities which are steeped in an interiority, which they have discovered is not their own but something wider and deeper than themselves, of which they are a part.” Faith was published in book form by SteidlMack, Göttingen, in 2007, in conjunction with an exhibition at Jack Shainman Gallery, New York.

=== Terrain ===
Terrain (2013) comprises portraits Nickerson made of agricultural workers in Kenya, Zimbabwe and South Africa, in which the materials of their labour – including harvested bananas, packing crates, and sheaths of burlap and leaves – conceal the workers’ faces. Nickerson has described her subjects as “camouflaged by their produce, creating a hybrid figure”. Some images in the series were photographed through a veil of farming plastic which has been interpreted as a metaphor for separation from the natural world. By depicting workers with the tools and products of their exertion, Terrain concerns themes beyond strict portraiture including global political issues of labour, the environment, food scarcity, sustainability and human rights, as well as the psychic and material traces of work on people and nature: “The photographs still ripple with politics, particularly around the issues of food production, agribusiness and labor. It’s just that they are marked with a next-generation awareness of the pitfalls of photographing people.” TF Editores, Madrid, published the book Terrain in 2013.

=== Field Test ===
Nickerson's Field Test (2020) shows (mostly in a studio environment) human figures, largely heads, which have been obscured by a variety of manmade materials – including perforated packaging, mesh fabric and bubble wrap, and in particular “ag plastics” (“Plasticulture”, agriculture plastics used in farming operations) such as soil fumigation film, irrigation drip tape and packaging cord. Nickerson began work on Field Test in 2014 after Time magazine commissioned her to document the Ebola epidemic in Liberia, where she witnessed the protective role of plastics alongside their waste; the photos were completed before the COVID-19 pandemic. Central to the series are a sense of shared trauma, the effects of consumerism on the psyche, and how materials made by humans allow them to control their natural surroundings. Nickerson has described the series as addressing “new kinds of stress and communication, the environment, speciesism, the waste, the pressure, the mandatory compliance, the lack of privacy. […] It has a universal identity, like a collective smothering”. Kerber, Berlin, published Field Test in 2020.

=== Salvage ===
Salvage (2021) is a series of studio portraits in which Nickerson obstructs her sitters’ faces with “salvaged” objects including toys, flowers and food packaging. Employing such reused and recycled objects questions the relationship between consumers and commodities, and suggests an individual's sense of self is not enhanced but obscured by material possessions. Through an emphasis on balance, proportion and stillness, the portraits reference Old Master paintings, including the work of Hans Memling, Hans Holbein, Jan van Eyck and Albrecht Dürer, and challenge how portraiture historically concerned the representation of the elite and their wealth. Salvage was published by Kerber, Berlin, in 2021.

== Solo exhibitions ==
- 2008: Faith, Centre Culturel Irlandais, Paris
- 2009: Farm, Galerie Dominique Fiat, Paris
- 2009–10: Ten Miles Round, Photo Museum Ireland, Dublin
- 2010: Gulf, Maison de la Photographie, Lille
- 2013: Faith, Accademia d’Arte, Bologna
- 2013–14: Terrain, Brancolini Grimaldi, London
- 2015–16: Uniform, National Gallery of Ireland, Dublin
- 2016–17: August, National Underground Railroad Freedom Center, Cincinnati
- 2021: Field Test, Jack Shainman Gallery, New York

== Awards ==
- 2008: AIB Art Prize, Dublin
- 2009: Royal Hibernian Academy of Arts Prize, Dublin
- 2010, 2011, 2013: Visual Artist Award, Culture Ireland, Dublin
- 2013: Light Work Visiting Artist Grant, Syracuse University, New York

== Publications ==
- Farm, London: Jonathan Cape, 2002. ISBN 978-0-2240-6268-8
- Faith, Göttingen: SteidlMack, 2007. ISBN 978-3-8652-1484-3
- Terrain, Madrid: TF Editores, 2013. ISBN 978-8-4152-5394-5
- Field Test, Berlin: Kerber, 2020. ISBN 978-3-7356-0734-8
- Salvage, Berlin: Kerber, 2021. ISBN 978-3-7356-0755-3
- Fashion Eye Iceland, Paris: Louis Vuitton, 2024.ISBN 978-2-3698-3461-8

== Public collections ==
- Cleveland Clinic Art Collection, Ohio
- Irish Museum of Modern Art, Dublin
- Museum of Modern Art, New York
- National Gallery of Art, Washington, D.C.
- National Gallery of Ireland, Dublin
- Santa Barbara Museum of Art, Santa Barbara
- Vatican Museums, Vatican City
