= Making Their Mark: Works from the Shah Garg Collection =

Art exhibition of selections from the Shah Garg Collection

Making Their Mark: Works from the Shah Garg Collection is an art exhibition that traveled to several locations from 2023 through 2027. It features works of women artists from the collection the Shah Garg Foundation. The exhibition included works in a wide variety of media from the 20th and 21st century.

The show has presented at

- 548 West 22nd Street, New York, New York, November 2, 2023 through March 23, 2024
- Berkeley Art Museum and Pacific Film Archive in Berkeley, California October 27, 2024 through April 20, 2025
- Mildred Lane Kemper Art Museum, Washington University in St. Louis, Missouri September 12, 2025 through January 5, 2026
- National Museum of Women in the Arts in Washington, D.C. February 27, 2026 through July 26, 2026

== Artists ==
- Pacita Abad
- Etel Adnan
- Emma Amos
- Firelei Báez
- Jennifer Bartlett
- Lynda Benglis
- Carol Bove
- Andrea Bowers
- Cecily Brown
- Rosemarie Castoro
- Barbara Chase-Riboud
- Judy Chicago
- Melissa Cody
- Mary Corse
- Olga de Amaral
- Aria Dean
- Simone Fattal
- Freedom Quilting Bee
- Sonia Gomes
- Françoise Grossen
- Trude Guermonprez
- Harmony Hammond
- Mary Heilmann
- Sheila Hicks
- Sheree Hovsepian
- Jacqueline Humphries
- Suzanne Jackson
- Virginia Jaramillo
- Barbara Kasten
- Maria Lassnig
- Simone Leigh
- Tau Lewis
- Mary Lovelace O'Neal
- Julie Mehretu
- Joan Mitchell
- Elizabeth Murray
- Wangechi Mutu
- Senga Nengudi
- Magdalene Odundo
- Laura Owens
- Helen Pashgian
- Howardena Pindell
- Jaune Quick-to-See Smith
- Faith Ringgold
- Pinaree Sanpitak
- Joyce J. Scott
- Judith Scott
- Kay Sekimachi
- Tschabalala Self
- Joan Semmel
- Amy Sillman
- Lorna Simpson
- Rose B. Simpson
- Janet Sobel
- Pat Steir
- Sarah Sze
- Toshiko Takaezu
- Elizabeth Talford Scott
- Lenore Tawney
- Rosemarie Trockel
- Uman
- Charline von Heyl
- Kay WalkingStick
- Mary Weatherford
- Dyani White Hawk
- Haegue Yang
- Portia Zvavahera
- Zarina
