= Tau Lewis =

Canadian artist

- Born: October 31, 1993 (age 32); Toronto, Ontario Canada
- Known for: Sculpture
- Website: taulewis.com

Tau Lewis (born 1993 in Toronto, Ontario) is a Jamaican-Canadian artist, mostly known for her sculptures in which she works with a variety of mediums including hand-sewn, carved, and assemblage. Lewis's environmentally-conscious use of reclaimed scraps and found materials connects with histories of resourcefulness employed by artists of the Southern United States.

Her work is in the collections of the San Francisco Museum of Modern Art and the Tampa Museum of Art. Her sculpture Symphony was installed in the rotunda of the National Gallery of Canada from July 16, 2021 through January 2, 2022. In 2024 her work was exhibited at the Institute of Contemporary Art, Boston. Her work was included in the exhibition Making Their Mark: Works from the Shah Garg Collection at the Berkeley Art Museum and Pacific Film Archive (BAMPFA).

== Early life and education ==
Lewis was born in 1993, in Toronto, Canada. She was raised by her Irish and French Canadian mother, who ran a small landscaping business until her death in 2022. Lewis' father was born in Jamaica and ran a reggae bar in Toronto. Lewis, who has a passion for writing, attended school for journalism twice and dropped out both times before dedicating herself to her art. As a result, Lewis is a self-taught artist who has crafted her education through communication with her peers and through the meeting and research of some of her artistic influences such as Lonnie Holley and the Gee’s Bend Quilting Collective. As critic Tiana Reid wrote in an Art News interview, “although Lewis did not attend art school, she received her education in a less conventional way, through the close study of her creative inspirations”.

== Work ==
Lewis is known widely for her sculptural work that employs the use of found objects and fabrics that are often found, thrifted, or donated to her. She then combines these materials through hand-sewing, quilting, appliqué, and carving methods which results in creations that often evoke fantastical otherworldly beings with an outwardly handmade quality. By using these hands-on techniques Lewis develops a strong connection to the materials and the resulting sculptural work. In interviews, Lewis discusses a transference of energy that occurs through time and touch between herself, her found materials, and the final work. In this way, Lewis draws the objects’ past histories and experiences into her own ever-evolving narrative that surrounds her work.
