= Uman (artist) =

Self-taught Somali-born contemporary artist

Uman (born 1980) is a self-taught Somali-born contemporary artist whose work blends abstraction and figuration, with references to Arabic calligraphy and the natural world. She is based in upstate New York.

== Biography ==
Uman was born in Mogadishu, Somalia. At age nine, her family relocated to Mombasa, Kenya to escape the Somali Civil War. Uman moved to Denmark to live with an aunt at 13. As a teenager, she visited art museums in Vienna, Austria.

Uman does not have a formal arts education, but spent a lot of time drawing and sewing as a child. She reportedly got in trouble at school for doodling on her desk.

In the early 2000s, the artist moved to New York City, where she sold her artwork on the street. Uman has lived and worked in upstate New York since 2010. She has not returned to Africa since her childhood, partly due to fears about her safety as a trans woman.

== Artwork ==
Uman's artistic practice spans painting, drawing, sculpture, and mixed media, although she is best known for her paintings. Her work is very colorful and layered, characterized by expressive mark making. Her compositions, which she often refers to as "self-portraits," typically include elements of abstraction and figuration. Recurring motifs in her work include geometric shapes, circular spirals, imagery from African folk tales and East African textiles, and elements reminiscent of Arabic calligraphy, reflecting her early exposure to Islamic art and traditions.

== Career ==
Uman participated in group art shows in New York City beginning in 2012. The artist's first solo show was at While Columns in 2015.

Uman's work has been exhibited internationally, including at Hauser & Wirth in London, where her 2023 exhibition Darling Sweetie, Sweetie Darling showcased large-scale paintings and a site-specific mural. Gallerist Nicola Vassell dedicated her booth to Uman's work at the Independent Art Fair in May 2022. In December 2023, her work was featured at Art Basel Miami.

Her work was included in the 2024 exhibition Making Their Mark: Works from the Shah Garg Collection at the Berkeley Art Museum and Pacific Film Archive (BAMPFA). In October 2025 the Aldrich Contemporary Art Museum in Connecticut presented a solo exhibition entitled Uman: After all the things ....

In October 2026, Eleni Koroneou Gallery will present the solo exhibition, Nice to Meet You, Again, in Athens, Greece. The exhibit includes new works that the artist created in Greece.
