= Nina Chanel Abney =

American artist

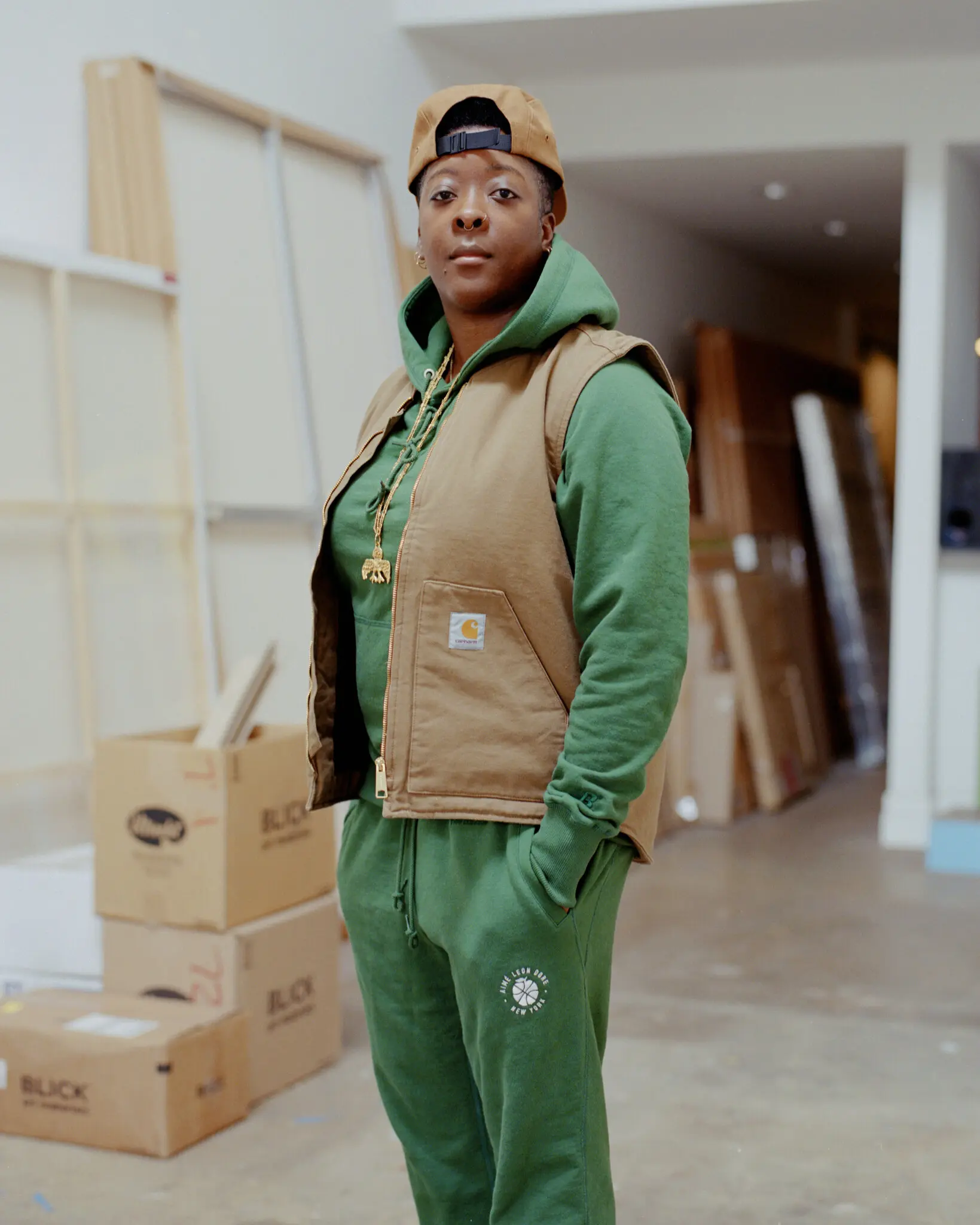
- Born: Harvey, Illinois, US
- Education: Augustana College; Parsons School of Design
- Website: www.ninachanel.com

Nina Chanel Abney is an American artist, based in New York. She was born in Harvey, Illinois. She is an African American contemporary artist and painter who explores race, gender, pop culture, homophobia, and politics in her work.

== Personal life ==
After a fire at their home, Abney and her mother moved in with her aunt in Matteson, Illinois where she attended Rich South High School. Abney said that she would get teased about "talking white" by other students. In order to connect with other students, she would take requests to draw "portraits of famous black figures in pop culture." Abney began to explore art more formally in high school. She said that it took her a while to find her voice when speaking out about issues that matter to her like the Black Lives Matter movement. Her influences include the animated series South Park and hip-hop music.

== Style ==
Abney's style of painting is mostly graphic, cubist, and color-blocked, using techniques like spray painting, collaging, and layering shapes and symbols. Abney likes to switch around races and genders in her figures, subverting the viewer's preconceived notions. She uses symbolic imagery to convey deep messages with simple visuals, vibrant colors, and "cartoonish" figures, inviting viewers to draw their own conclusions. Abney does not plan ahead or sketch; improvisation is a large part of her artistic process. Art dealer and curator Jeffrey Deitch once compared her skill to that of Keith Haring.

== Education ==
In high school, Abney was encouraged by one of her teachers to take Advanced Placement Art. This led her to attend Augustana College in Rock Island, Illinois where she received a BFA with a dual major in studio art and computer science in 2004. While attending college, Abney took part in a campus-wide walkout in protest of the lack of diversity in the faculty, which contributed to the political focus of her art. After graduating, she worked as an assembly line worker at Ford Motor Company. She quit after witnessing a co-worker get their leg crushed in an accident. She began to paint every day and was accepted to the Chicago Art Institute and the Parsons School of Design where she received an MFA in 2007.

== Career ==
In 2007, Abney received recognition for her painting Class of 2007, done for her MFA thesis show. The painting is a diptych. In one panel, she is depicted as a blonde officer carrying a gun. In the second panel, her MFA classmates, all white, are painted as black inmates in orange uniforms. She has stated that putting her classmates into her painting was “nothing personal...when I put people in my paintings now—it's not you, it's just a face.” She also stated that the show was “[her] only chance to get the attention of a gallery”. Abney locates much of her work in the recognition that abuse and violence are an integral part of the everyday consciousness of people of color. The painting was purchased by the Rubell family, owners of the Rubell Museum in Miami, Florida. At the start of her career, she felt that her work had to focus on race, but it has now evolved to focus more on whatever is relevant to her in the moment.

Abney is best known for her colorful graphic large-scale paintings, four of which are included in the Rubell Museum's 30 Americans exhibition of works by African American artists of the last three decades, which has toured museums and galleries in the United States since 2008. Her work has also appeared in the Whitney Museum, the Jack Shainman Gallery, and the Kravets Wehby Gallery.

Through the Town Hall Education Arts Recreation Campus, Abney worked with the Corcoran Gallery of Art's after-school program ArtReach to create a permanent mural in the DC area.

In 2013, Abney was a guest lecturer at the New York Academy of Art. In 2015, she presented at the Summit Series in Utah.

In 2020, Mattel partnered with Abney and Pharrell Williams' non-profit organization Black Ambition Inc. to create a custom UNO deck using Abney's art. In 2022, Abney collaborated with Air Jordan on a clothing line. In 2023, Abney collaborated with Timberland.

== Exhibitions ==
Abney's first show, Dirty Wash, was hosted at the Kravets Wehby Gallery in the spring of 2008. Attracting many major collectors, the show sold out within days.

In November 2017, she held her first solo show at Jack Shainman Gallery, Nina Chanel Abney: Seized the Imagination. This exhibition ran concurrently with Safe House, a solo show curated by Piper Marshall at the Mary Boone Gallery in New York City. Abney's aim in both shows is to combat the negative stereotypes with which the mainstream media often portrays African Americans.

In December 2017, Abney created her first 3D installation at 29Rooms in Los Angeles called Fair Grounds, an interactive experiential series of sculptures that evokes the childhood look and feel of a playground.

Her first solo exhibition in a museum, Nina Chanel Abney: Royal Flush, opened at the Nasher Museum of Art at Duke University in February 2017. Curated by Marshall N. Price, the exhibition included about 30 of her paintings, watercolors, and collages and spans ten years of her work. The works contain a wide range of references to medieval icons, Northern Renaissance still lifes, and artists such as Henri Matisse and John Wesley. They illustrate narcissism, celebrity culture, the objectification of women, issues of race, and police brutality. Before the show opened, she said she “hoped that it makes people angry and a mix of reactions”.

In her February 2018 exhibition Hot to Trot. Not. at Palais de Tokyo in Paris, Abney created site specific murals along the institution's main stairwell. One depicts the busts of three black women against a yellow background, the numbers 1, 2, 3 listed under each one. Next to the figures, Abney painted “WHAT?” in black letters.

In September 2018, Abney curated Punch, a group exhibition, at the Jeffery Deitch gallery. The exhibition centered on contemporary sociopolitical issues.

Additional exhibitions include:

- I Dread To Think, 2012
- Always a Winner, 2015
- Royal Flush, 2017
- Fair Grounds, 2017
- Safe House, 2017
- Seized the Imagination, 2017
- Hot to Trot. Not., 2018
- Chicago Cultural Center, 2018
- Institute of Contemporary Art, Los Angeles & California African American Museum, 2018
- Neuberger Museum of Art, Purchase College, 2019

== Collections ==
Abner's work is included in the collections of the Bronx Museum of the Arts; the Brooklyn Museum; the Museum of Modern Art; the Rubell Museum; and the Whitney Museum of American Art.

== Books ==
- 30 Americans: Rubell Family Collection. Rubell Family Collection (publisher), 2012. By Robert Hobbs, Glen Logon, Franklin Sirmans and Michele Wallace. ISBN 978-0-9821195-5-6.
- Nina Chanel Abney: Royal Flush. Duke University, 2017. By Marshall N. Price. ISBN 978-0-938989-41-7.
