= Leslie Wayne =

German painter

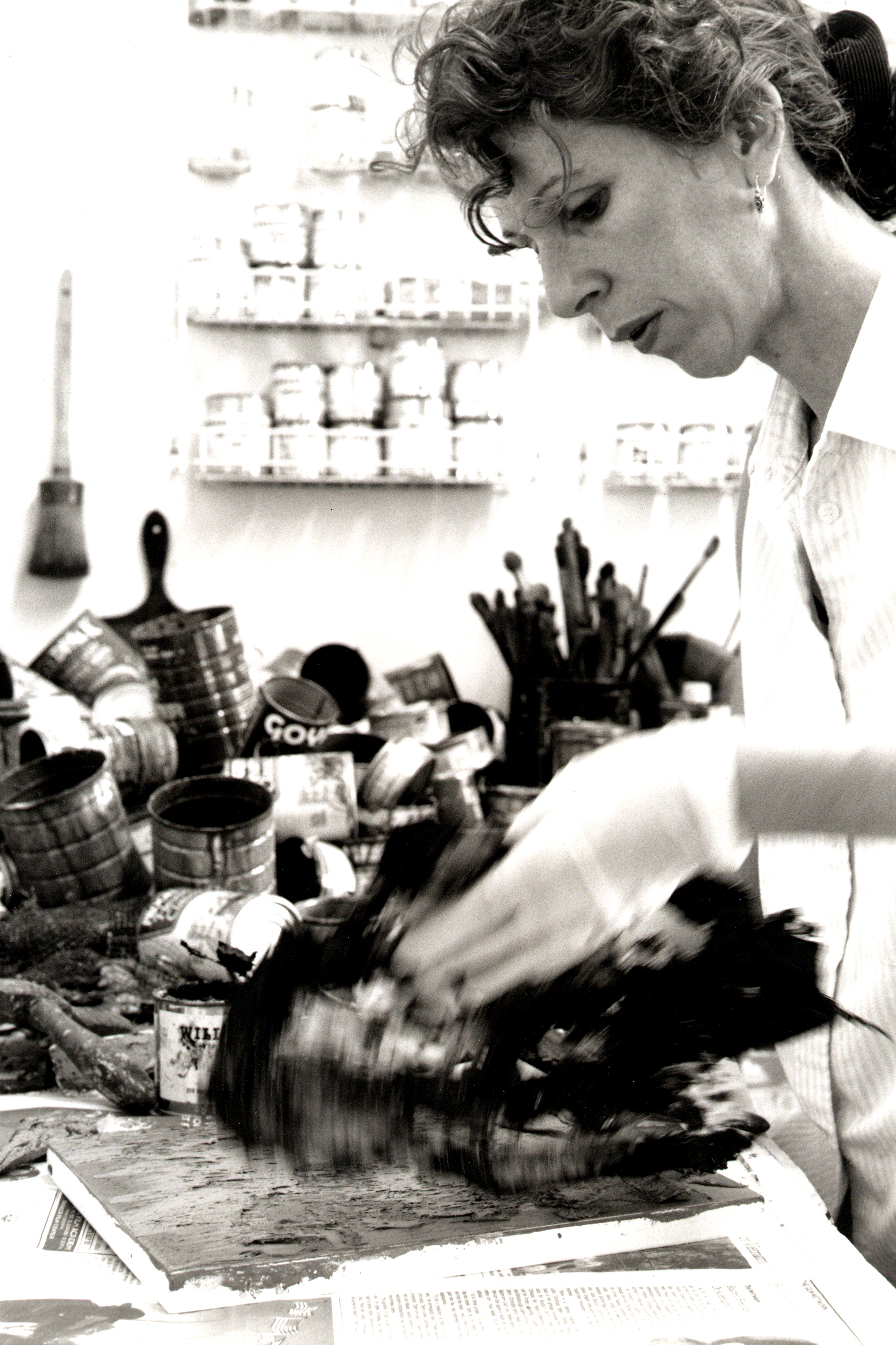
- Wayne working in Hell's Kitchen NYC studio, 1998
- Born: 1953 (age 72–73); Landstuhl, Germany
- Education: Parsons School of Design (BFA, 1984)
- Known for: Painting
- Style: Minimalist abstract painting
- Spouse: Don Porcaro
- Awards: John Simon Guggenheim Memorial Foundation Award in Fine Arts (2017); Inducted into National Academy of Design in New York City (2016)

Leslie Wayne (born 1953, Landstuhl, Germany) is a visual artist who lives and works in New York City. Wayne is best known for her "highly dimensional paintings".

== Early life and education ==
Leslie Wayne was born in Landstühl, Germany, to American parents and grew up in Los Angeles and Newport Beach. At the age of 7, she was taking private art lessons and attended classes on the weekends throughout high school. Her first two years of undergraduate work at the University of California, Santa Barbara's College of Creative Studies focused on the figure, plein-air landscapes, and printmaking. She created a suite of etchings and aquatints based on the photographs of Jacques Henri Lartigue, with whom she had begun a correspondence.

Inspired by her correspondence with Lartigue, Wayne took her Junior year off and moved to Paris from 1974 to 1975, where she attended French classes at the Alliance Française, and continued to paint on her own and at various small ateliers. At the Alliance Française, Wayne met an Israeli man, with whom she developed a relationship. After having returned to California, she moved to Israel in 1975 to be with him and lived there until 1980. In Israel, she continued to paint and explore other creative outlets, including ceramics and children's book illustration. Wayne returned to Southern California in 1980 and two years later moved to New York City, where she enrolled in Parsons School of Design. At Parsons, Wayne became a sculpture major and studied with Ronald Bladen and Don Porcaro, whom she later married in 1987. She graduated with honors, with a BFA in sculpture in 1984.

== Work ==
=== Early work ===
Wayne's early work was driven by a focus on technique and observation. Her inspiration came from French Impressionism, particularly the paintings of Van Gogh, Lautrec and Manet, and the photographs of Jacques Henri Lartigue, which she studied closely while living in Paris. Only after her classes at the Académie de la Grande Chaumière, did she first venture into abstraction.

Wayne had her first solo show in 1979 while living in Israel at the Jerusalem Theatre Gallery of works inspired by Georgia O'Keeffe's desert landscape paintings. Once she returned home to California, she continued to paint plein-air landscapes. With the hills of Laguna Beach as her source, Wayne developed a deep love for and identification with the landscape and geology of the California and the West.

=== New York ===
Wayne moved to New York City in 1982 to finish her degree, and transferred to Parsons School of Design. Sensing the magnetic pull of the art world, she abandoned landscape to engage with postmodern abstraction, the prevailing discourse at the time, and to explore other mediums. Inspired by the work of David Smith, she decided to study sculpture. But after graduation and without adequate studio space, Wayne returned to painting and developed a minimalist abstract style inspired by many trips she and her husband Don Porcaro made to the Southwest. She exhibited these works in her first New York solo show at 55 Mercer Gallery, one of New York's preeminent artist run cooperatives. However pleased she was with this body of work, Wayne longed for the creative challenges she experienced while making sculpture, and started experimenting in her studio, challenging the physical limitations of paint and resulting in a style that became the identifying characteristic of her career's work. In 1992 she received a fellowship to Yaddo where she refined her new dimensional approach to abstract painting. During this time she had also become a member of 55 Mercer and showed these paintings later that year. That show became a signal success, largely due to the support of the art historian and advisor Ruth Kaufmann, who introduced Wayne's work to Jack Shainman Gallery. She was invited to join the gallery the following year and has had 12 solo shows with Shainman since then.

Wayne's works, hybrids of sculpture and painting, range from small scale to larger multi-paneled and shaped paintings. Wayne's themes explore the intersection of abstraction and figuration and forms in nature, as well as perception and the relationship between object and image by engaging and challenging the conventional notions of the painting medium.

Throughout the years Wayne's abstract paintings were based on landscape and geology, as a kind of call and response to the forces of nature that act on all materials, whether paint on a canvas or lava on a volcanic mountain. Her paintings were intended to give the viewer an analogous experience to being in nature, rather than a disembodied picture of it. In 2021, on a trip to the West Coast, Wayne took a series of aerial photographs from the plane, crossing the Rockies all the way to the Cascade Mountains in Washington State. Those images became the source material for a series of aerial landscape paintings that explored ideas about land, the environment, ownership and Manifest Destiny. Inspired by Woody Guthrie's iconic song, "This Land is Your Land," this series was titled "This Land" and was shown at Jack Shainman Gallery in 2024, signaling a definitive return into representational landscape painting.

== Career ==
Wayne had her first two New York City solo shows at 55 Mercer Street Gallery in 1990 and 1992. In 1992 she joined Jack Shainman Gallery and had her first solo show there in 1993.

In 2002, an installation of sixty of Wayne's paintings inaugurated the new Samuel Dorsky Museum of Art in New Paltz, NY as part of an installation with 60 of Porcaro's small scale sculptures. The show was expanded in 2004, becoming a survey of her and Porcaro's work from the previous decade. Titled "The Object of Time: Charting A Decade", the exhibition traveled to the University Gallery at the University of Florida in Gainesville, the Crossley Gallery at the Ringling School of Art and Design, and the Red Gallery at the Savannah College of Art and Design.

Wayne's work is in many public collections throughout the United States and abroad, including the Birmingham Museum of Art, Birmingham, AL; The Cooper Hewitt, Smithsonian Design Museum, NYC; The Corcoran Gallery of Art, Washington, D.C.; Collezione Maramotti, Reggio Emilia, Italy; the Davis Museum, Wellesley, Massachusetts; Fondation Cartier pour l'Art Contemporain, Paris, France; Harvard University Business School Schwartz Art Collection, Cambridge, Massachusetts; Colección Jumex, Mexico City, Mexico; Neuberger Museum of Art, Purchase, New York; The Parrish Art Museum, Watermill, New York; Portland Museum of Art, Portland, Oregon; The Miami Museum of Contemporary Art, Miami, Florida; and Reed College Special Collections Library, Portland, Oregon, among others.

== Awards ==
Wayne is a member of the National Academy of Design (class of 2016) and currently serves as Vice Chair of their Board of Governors. Other honors and awards include a Francis J. Greenburger Award (2025), two New York Foundation for the Arts Fellowships in Painting (2018, 2006), a John Simon Guggenheim Memorial Foundation Award in Fine Arts (2017), a Joan Mitchell Foundation Artist's Grant (2012), a Buhl Foundation Award for Abstract Photography (2004), an Adolph and Esther Gottlieb Foundation Artist's Grant (1994), a Hillwood Art Museum/New York State Council on the Arts Projects Residency Grant (1993), a Yaddo Artist's Residency Fellowship (1992), a Change Inc. Artist's Emergency Grant (1985), two Artist's Space Exhibition Grants (1985, 1990), and a Pollock-Krasner Foundation Artist's Grant (1985).

Public art works include a 2016 commission by the MTA Arts & Design program for windows at the newly renovated Bay Parkway Station in Brooklyn, New York.

== Personal life ==
Wayne lives and works in New York City with her husband, sculptor Don Porcaro.
