= Toyin Ojih Odutola =

Nigerian visual artist

- Born: 1985 (age 40–41); Ife, Nigeria
- Education: California College of the Arts; University of Alabama in Huntsville
- Occupation: Visual artist
- Known for: pastel, charcoal, pencil, black pen ink
- Website: toyinojihodutola.com

Toyin Ojih Odutola (born 1985) is a Nigerian-American contemporary visual artist known for her vivid multimedia drawings and works on paper.

Lonely Chambers (T.O.), 2011, pen ink and marker drawing on paper, by Toyin Ojih Odutola (Image courtesy of the artist, Jack Shainman Gallery, Adam Green Art Advisory and the Green Family Art Foundation.)

== Early life and education ==
Ojih Odutola was born in 1985 in Ile-Ife, Nigeria, where both her parents were teachers. In 1990 her mother, Nelene Ojih, took Toyin and her two-year-old brother to the United States to accompany their father, Dr. Jamiu Ade Odutola, in Berkeley, California, where he was undergoing research and teaching chemistry at the university. After four years in Berkeley, the family moved to Huntsville, Alabama in 1994 where her father became an associate professor at Alabama A&M University and her mother a nurse. Ojih Odutola is of Yoruba and Igbo descent from her paternal and maternal heritage, respectively.

In 2007, while an undergraduate, she participated in the Norfolk Summer Residency for Music & Art, from Yale University in Connecticut. Shortly after in 2008, she received a Bachelor of Arts degree in Studio Art and Communications from the University of Alabama in Huntsville. In 2012, she earned a Master of Fine Arts degree from California College of the Arts, in San Francisco.

== Career ==
While studying at California College of Arts in San Francisco, she presented her first solo show in New York, "(MAPS)" at Jack Shainman Gallery in 2011. It was composed of a collection of individual black figures in decontextualized white backgrounds drawn in layers with a ballpoint pen. The ideas behind this series of skin as geography introduced her as a new voice in the visual representation of black skin.

Forbes featured Ojih Odutola in its 2012 list of 30 notable individuals under 30 in the category "Art & Style."

In 2015, her solo museum exhibition, "Untold Stories," at the Contemporary Art Museum St Louis, introduced storytelling and text into her work, marking a shift in her studio practice.

In 2016, she presented "A Matter of Fact," a solo exhibition at the Museum of the African Diaspora, in San Francisco, exploring a new style of works she developed during her residency at Headlands Center for the Arts, in Sausalito, California.

Her work was the featured cover story for Juxtapoz Magazine in November 2017, on the occasion of her museum solo exhibition, "To Wander Determined," at Whitney Museum of American Art, in New York. The exhibition presented a vibrant series of figures connected by a fictional narrative of two aristocratic Nigerian dynasties, who are joined by the union of titled sons from both families. Ojih Odutola introduces the portraits as the private collection from these families, which are of different upper-class origins unencumbered by the history of colonialism. The premise behind the portraits being fictional invites the audience to decipher the truth behind them.

She was appointed the Lida A. Orzeck ’68 Distinguished Artist-in-Residence for the academic year of 2017 to 2018 at Barnard College in New York.

In 2018, she participated in the 12th iteration of the Manifesta international biennial, in Palermo, Italy, with her solo presentation, "Scenes of Exchange."

In September 2018, she was nominated as one of the 21 shortlisted artists for the Future Generation Art Prize for 2019, presented in a group exhibition at the PinchukArtCentre in Kyiv, Ukraine, which subsequently traveled to be included in a collateral exhibition for the 58th Venice Biennale in 2019.

Ojih Odutola was inducted into the National Academicians Class of 2019, of the National Academy of Design. The lifetime honor appointment acknowledges members' contributions to the canon and story of American art.

In August 2020, her first museum solo exhibition in the United Kingdom opened at The Curve gallery at Barbican Centre, London, titled "A Countervailing Theory." For this commission, Ojih Odutola created 40 works depicting an ancient parable set in central Nigeria's Jos Plateau. In the artist's interview with The Guardian, Ojih Odutola said that the exhibition was inspired by two episodes: reading about ancient rock formations in central Nigeria; and hearing about a German archaeologist who mistakenly attributed brass statues found in Nigeria to ‘Greeks from Atlantis’ because he ‘couldn’t couldn’t conceive of Nigerians having the mental aptitude to create such anatomically correct and beautiful objects’. Out of these two rose black and white drawings that ‘flip the script in every aspect’, in the words of the artist. Author, Zadie Smith, wrote an essay on the themes of the exhibition in The New Yorker, also included in the exhibition catalog.

== Style and influences ==
Ojih Odutola is best known for her detailed portrait drawings, entirely or primarily done in black pen ink. Her more recent work has expanded to include charcoal, pastel, chalk, and pencil. However, the artist does not consider herself a portraitist; the subjects of her drawings are actually drawn from many different people. She credits her high school art teacher, Dana Bathurst, for introducing her to African-American portraiture artists such as Jacob Lawrence, Elizabeth Catlett, Romare Bearden and Barkley L. Hendricks. Ojih Odutola has also received inspiration and influence from comic books, Japanese manga, and anime. Additionally, studying the works of contemporary artists like Kerry James Marshall, Wangechi Mutu, and Julie Mehretu had an impact while she was in graduate school.

Ojih Odutola explained that her initial interest in portraiture stemmed from a desire to represent herself and others who share her Black identity, but over time, her focus shifted toward storytelling. She observed that artists of color are often subject to biographical interpretations that overshadow the content of their work. By creating characters, Ojih Odutola felt liberated from these preconceived narratives, allowing viewers to engage more directly with the imagery and stories presented.

== Themes ==
Ojih Odutola's artwork often investigates a variety of themes from socio-economic inequality, the legacy of colonialism, queer and gender studies, notions of blackness as a visual and social symbol, as well as experiences of migration and dislocation.

== Exhibitions ==
Selected solo exhibitions:

- 2008: A Colonized Mind, University Center Gallery, University of Alabama in Huntsville, Alabama, thesis solo exhibition.
- 2011: (MAPS), Jack Shainman Gallery, New York, which marked her first solo exhibition at the gallery and in New York City.
- 2013: My Country Has No Name, Jack Shainman Gallery, New York, which dealt with themes on the malleability and suspicion regarding identity and how a portrait can only be a fragmented oversimplification of a person.
- 2013—2014: The Constant Wrestler, Indianapolis Museum of Contemporary Art (iMOCA), Indianapolis, Indiana. The exhibition was later profiled by Julie Bramowitz for Interview Magazine, published December 3, 2013.
- 2014: Like the Sea, Jack Shainman Gallery, New York. The exhibition title is inspired by an aphorism from Zora Neale Hurston's novel, Their Eyes Were Watching God, where Hurston writes, "Love is lak de sea. It's uh movin' thing, but still and all, it takes its shape from de shore it meets, and it's different with every shore."
- 2015: Untold Stories, Contemporary Art Museum St. Louis, Missouri.
- 2015—2016: Of Context and Without, Jack Shainman Gallery, New York. The exhibition was profiled by Emily McDermott for Interview Magazine on December 20, 2015.
- 2016—2017: A Matter of Fact, Museum of the African Diaspora (MoAD), San Francisco, California. The architect, David Adjaye, named the exhibition as one of the "Best of 2016" in the December issue of Artforum International Magazine.
- 2017—2018: To Wander Determined, Whitney Museum of American Art. The exhibition was profiled by Zadie Smith for British Vogue in the June 2018 issue.
- 2018: Testing the Name, Savannah College of Art and Design's (SCAD) Museum of Art, Savannah, Georgia, which was included in the SCAD de:FINE exhibition series for that season.
- 2018: participated in the 12th Manifesta Biennial, hosted in Palermo, Italy, with her solo exhibition, Scenes of Exchange, held at the Orto Botanico di Palermo.
- 2018: The Firmament, Hood Museum of Art, of Dartmouth College, Hanover, New Hampshire.
- 2018: When Legends Die, Jack Shainman Gallery, New York.
- 2020: A Countervailing Theory, Barbican Centre, in London, England, her first solo museum exhibition in the UK.
- 2020: Tell Me A Story, I Don't Care If It's True, Jack Shainman Gallery, New York, investigating fundamental misconceptions and "gaps in understanding" between image and text. All works in the show were created during COVID-19 lockdown in New York.
- 2022-23: New Work, San Francisco Museum of Modern Art.
- 2025: Ilé Oriaku, Jack Shainman Gallery, New York.

Ojih Odutola has also participated in group exhibitions at various institutions, including:

- Future Generation Art Prize @ Venice 2019, Part of the 58th Venice Biennale (2019).
- Show Me as I Want to Be Seen, at the Contemporary Jewish Museum, San Francisco, (2019).
- For Opacity: Elijah Burgher, Toyin Ojih Odutola, and Nathaniel Mary Quinn, at The Drawing Center, New York, (2018).
- Histórias Afro-Atlânticas (Afro-Atlantic Stories), at São Paulo Museum of Art, São Paulo, Brazil, (2018).
- Disguise: Masks and Global African Art, at Brooklyn Museum, New York, (2016).
- FORE and Black: Color, Material, Concept, at Studio Museum in Harlem, New York, (2015, 2012, respectively).
- Ballpoint Pen Drawing Since 1950, at Aldrich Contemporary Art Museum, Ridgefield, (2013).
- The Progress of Love, at the Menil Collection, Houston, (2012).
- Afro: Black Identity in America and Brazil, Tamarind Institute, University of New Mexico, Albuquerque, (2012).

== Collections ==
Ojih Odutola's work is held in many public collections, including:

- Museum of Modern Art, New York
- Whitney Museum of American Art, New York
- The Metropolitan Museum of Art, New York
- Birmingham Museum of Art, AL
- Baltimore Museum of Art, Maryland
- Frye Art Museum, Seattle, Washington
- Hood Museum of Art, Dartmouth College, New Hampshire
- Institute of Contemporary Art, Boston, Massachusetts
- Mississippi Museum of Art, Mississippi
- Museum of Contemporary Art San Diego
- National Portrait Gallery, London, United Kingdom
- New Orleans Museum of Art, Louisiana
- Pennsylvania Academy of the Fine Arts, Philadelphia, Pennsylvania
- Philadelphia Museum of Art, Pennsylvania
- Princeton University Art Museum, New Jersey
- RISD Museum of Art, Providence, Rhode Island
- Society for Contemporary Art, Art Institute of Chicago, Illinois
- Spencer Museum of Art, Kansas
- Honolulu Museum of Art Spalding House, Hawaii
- National Museum of African Art, Smithsonian Institution, Washington, D.C.

== Awards ==
- 2007: Ellen Battell Stoeckel Fellowship Grant, Yale University.
- 2008: Erzulie Veasey Johnson Painting & Drawing Award, University of Alabama in Huntsville.
- 2011: Murphy and Cadogan Fellowship Award, The San Francisco Foundation.
- 2017: Lida A. Orzeck Distinguished Artist-in-Residence, Barnard College.
- 2018: Rees Visionary Award, Amref Health Africa.
- 2019: Shortlisted for the Victor Pinchuk Foundation's Future Generation Art Prize.
- 2020: Lauréate of the Prix Jean-François Prat, The Bredin Prat Foundation for Contemporary Art.
- 2022: Great Immigrants Award, Carnegie Corporation of New York.

== Publications ==
- Alphabet: A Selected Index of Anecdotes and Drawings, 2012.
- The Treatment, 2015—17, Anteism Books, 2018.
- For Opacity: Elijah Burgher, Toyin Ojih Odutola, and Nathaniel Mary, The Drawing Center, Exhibition catalogue, 2018.
- Toyin Ojih Odutola: A Matter of Fact, Museum of the African Diaspora, Exhibition catalogue, 2019.
- A Countervailing Theory, Barbican Centre, Exhibition catalog, 2020.
