= West Chelsea Historic District =

Historic district in Manhattan, New York

Coordinates: 40°45′04″N 74°00′19″W

The West Chelsea Historic District is a portion of the neighborhood of Chelsea in Manhattan, New York City. It was designated as the city's 92nd historic district in July 2008 by the New York City Landmarks Preservation Commission.

It encompasses a portion of the streets between 25th and 28th Streets between Tenth Avenue and the West Side Highway and was designated as such for its architectural and manufacturing heritage. Approximately 30 structures within the district date from between 1885 and 1930 including the Starrett-Lehigh Building, the Otis Elevator Building and the Terminal Stores building. Some of the galleries in the Chelsea Arts District are housed in the District's historic buildings.
