= Chelsea Arts District =

Sub-neighborhood in Manhattan, New York

Coordinates: 40°44′54″N 74°0′21″W

The Chelsea Arts District, sometimes also called the West Chelsea Arts District or the Chelsea Gallery District is a region of Chelsea, Manhattan, New York City, that runs from 18th to 28th Street between Tenth Avenue and Eleventh Avenue that is known for its concentration of art galleries. It developed as part of the neighborhood's rezoning and shift in the international art market in the late 1990s and early 2000s.

While galleries have relocated to other areas due to rising rents and the distance from the subway, new galleries have taken their place and the area remains an arts hub.

While many galleries feature a rotating series of exhibits, the district is also known for longterm or permanent projects, such as Joseph Beuys' 7000 Oaks which began in 1988 with five trees that marked Dia Chelsea's opening and was extended in 1996 and remains due to a partnership with the Departments of Parks & Recreation and Transportation.

== See also ==
- West Chelsea Historic District
