= Ben Bowling =

Professor of Criminology and Criminal Justice

Benjamin Bowling FBA FAcSS
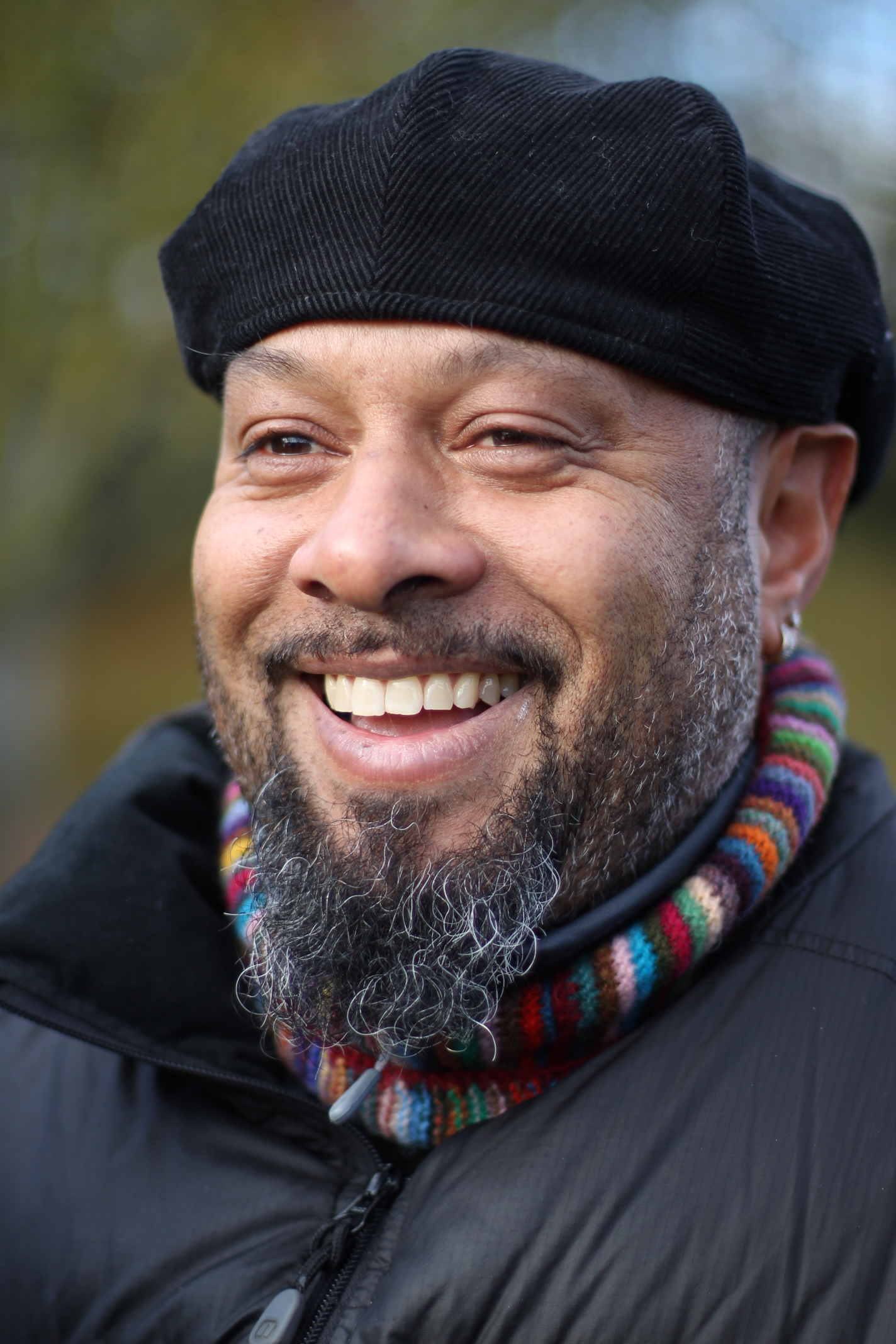
- Ben Bowling, on the Yorkshire Moors, wearing a scarf made by his stepmum, the weaver Rachel Scott
- Born: 25 November 1962 (age 63)
- Occupations: Professor of Criminology & Criminal Justice
- Parent(s): Frank Bowling and Claire Spencer

Academic background
- Education: Manchester Metropolitan University (BA); London School of Economics (PhD); Birkbeck College (MSc)
- Thesis: Policing violent racism: policy and practice in the East London locality (1995)

Academic work
- Institutions: King's College London; University of Cambridge
- Doctoral students: Katherine Grainger
- Website: kclpure.kcl.ac.uk/portal/ben.bowling.html

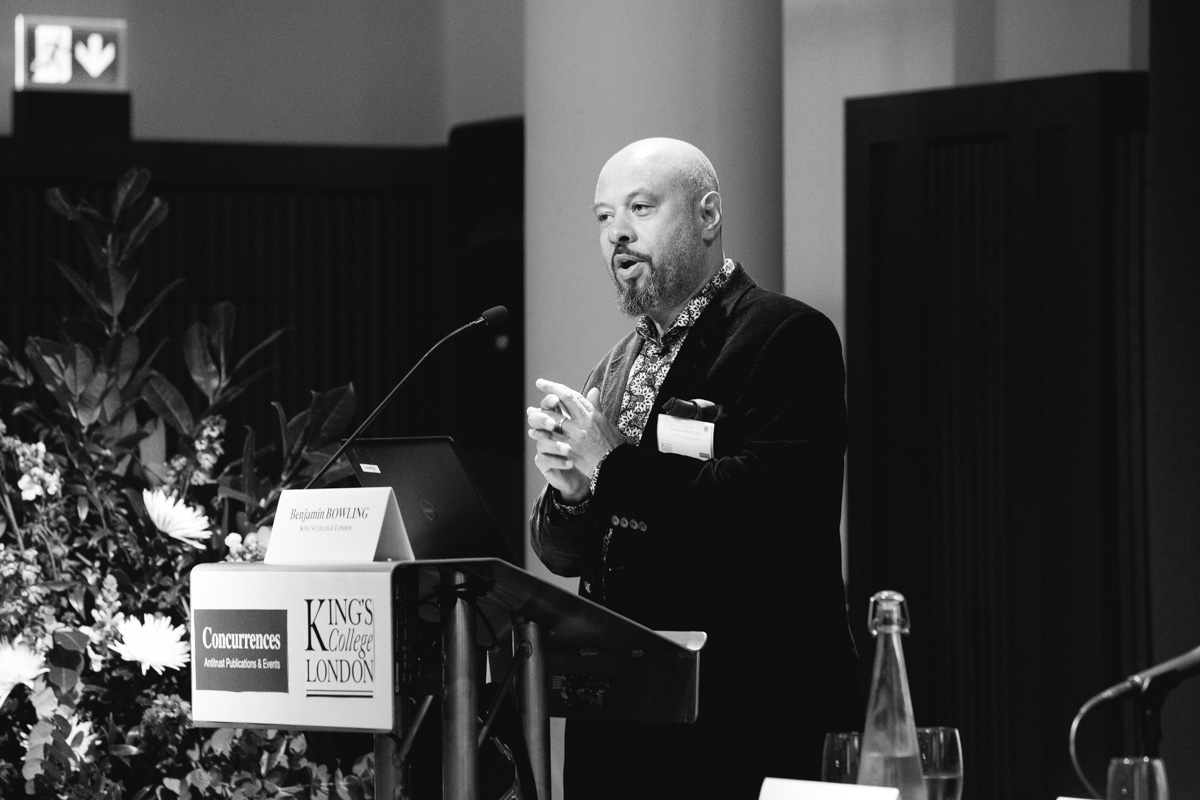
Bowling speaking at King's College London

Benjamin Bowling FBA FAcSS is Professor of Criminology & Criminal Justice at King's College London, an author and an honorary psychotherapist. He is a recipient of the Radzinowicz Memorial Prize awarded for the best article in the British Journal of Criminology in 1999. Bowling was elected Fellow of the British Academy in 2022.

== Early life and education ==
Bowling is the son of the artists Frank Bowling and Claire Spencer. He is of Guyanese descent through his father. He has a Bachelor of Arts degree in psychology from Manchester Metropolitan University and a PhD from the London School of Economics. He has a Master of Science degree in Psychodynamic Counselling and Psychotherapy from Birkbeck College.

== Career and research ==
After working at the Home Office Research Unit Bowling moved to the City University of New York and taught at the John Jay College of Criminal Justice before returning to Britain where he became a lecturer in criminology at the University of Cambridge in 1996.

He joined King's as a lecturer in law in 1999 and has been a visiting professor at the University of the West Indies, at Monash University and at the East China University of Political Science and Law.

Bowling's research examines practical, political and legal problems in policing and the connections between local and global police power. His work exploring central themes of fairness, effectiveness and accountability has been published in three books:

1. Policing the Caribbean (Oxford University Press 2010) ISBN 9780199577699
2. Global Policing (with James Sheptycki, SAGE Publishing 2012) ISBN 9781849200820
3. Stop and Search: Police Power in Global Context (edited with Leanne Weber, Routledge 2012) ISBN 9781138944107

in 2012 Bowling published (with James Sheptycki) a co-edited four-volume major work for SAGE Publishing on Global Policing and Transnational Law Enforcement. He has published numerous articles in the Modern Law Review, Criminal Law Review, Policing and Society and Theoretical Criminology.

Bowling's studies of Violent Racism (Oxford University Press 1998) and Racism, Crime and Justice (with Coretta Phillips, Longman 2002) are the standard works on these subjects.

=== Public engagement ===
Bowling submitted evidence to the Stephen Lawrence Inquiry in 1999 and has been a specialist adviser to the House of Commons, Home Affairs Committee, the Foreign and Commonwealth Office, the Equality and Human Rights Commission, the European Commission, Interpol and the United Nations.

He is a founding member of StopWatch, a charity that works to inform the public about the police's use of Stop and Search powers in the UK and to promote fair, effective and accountable policing. Bowling has appeared in the media commenting on stop and search and criminal justice.

=== Psychotherapy ===
Bowling is an honorary psychotherapist with the Central and North West London NHS Foundation Trust. He has an MSc in Psychodynamic Counselling and Psychotherapy from Birkbeck College and is a member of British Association for Counselling and Psychotherapy.

=== Awards and honours ===
Bowling is a recipient of the Radzinowicz Memorial Prize awarded for the best article in the British Journal of Criminology in 1999. He was elected a Fellow of the Academy of Social Sciences in 2005 and a Fellow of the British Academy in 2022.

=== Publications ===
Bowling's publications include:

- Young People and Crime (with John Graham; Home Office 1995) ISBN 9781858935515
- Violent Racism (Oxford University Press 1999) ISBN 9780198262527
- Racism, Crime and Justice (with Coretta Phillips: Longman criminology series, Pearson Education 2002) ISBN 9780582299665
- Policing the Caribbean (Oxford University Press 2010) ISBN 9780199577699
- Global Policing (With James Sheptycki: SAGE Publishing 2012) ISBN 9781849200820
- Stop and Search: Police Power in Global Context (with Leanne Weber, Routledge 2012) ISBN 9781138944107
- Global Policing and Transnational Law Enforcement Volumes 1 – 4 (with James Sheptycki, Sage Library of Criminology, SAGE Publishing 2015) ISBN 978-1473908048

== Personal life ==
Bowling is the frontman of the British blues band Doc Bowling and his Blues Professors.
