= Rachel Scott (disambiguation) =

Rachel Scott (1981–1999) was the first student murdered in the Columbine High School massacre.

Rachel Scott may also refer to:

- Rachel Scott (artist), British artist who creates hand-spun rugs
- Rachel Scott (designer), Jamaican and American fashion designer
- Rachel Scott, character in American television series The Last Ship
- Rachel Wacholder Scott (born 1975), American model and beach volleyball player
- Rachel Scott (women's education reformer) (1848–1905), Scottish women's education reformer, based in Manchester
- Rachel Scott (journalist) (born 1993), American journalist
