= Ursuline High School, Wimbledon =

Ursuline High School
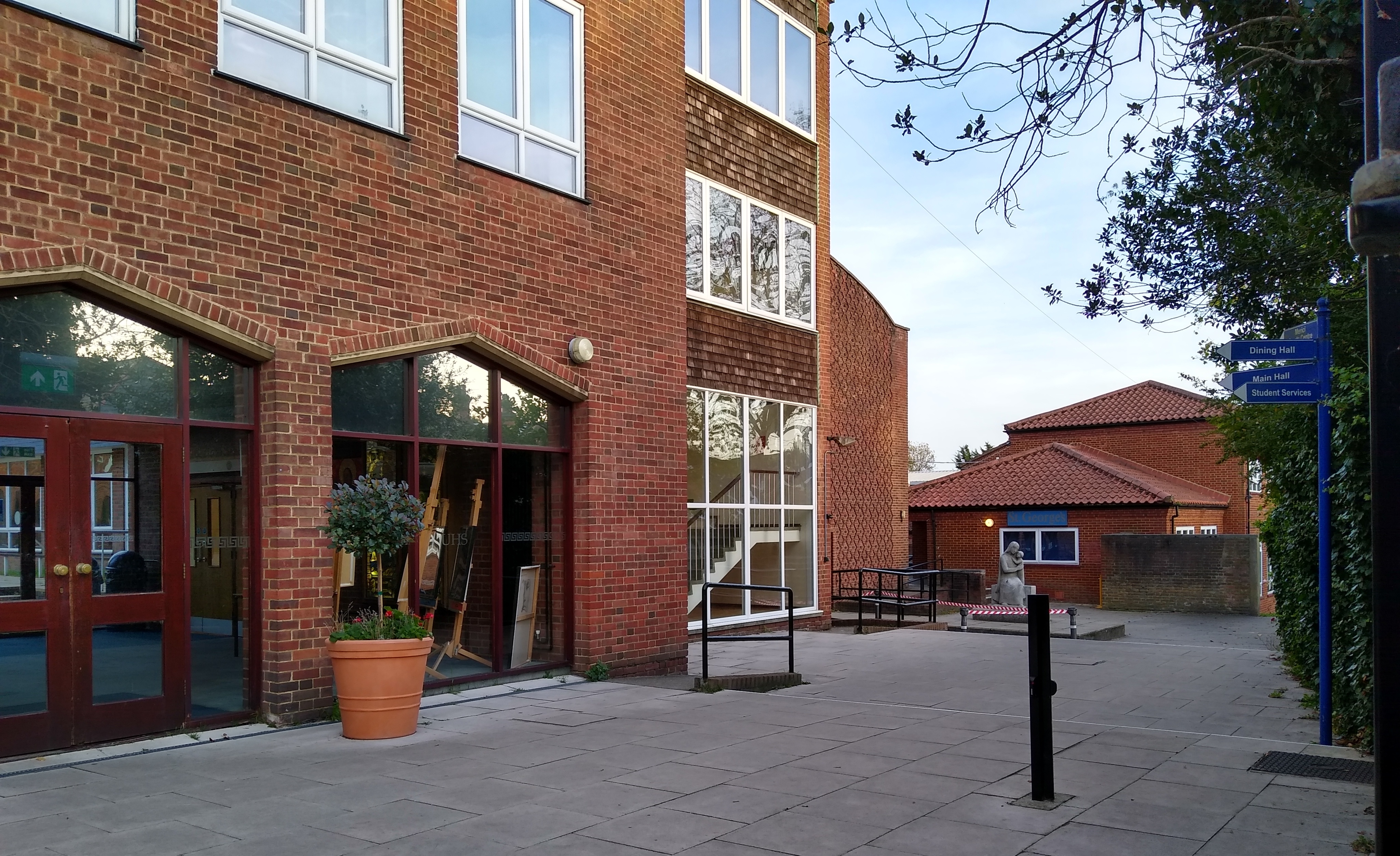

Location
- Crescent Road; Wimbledon, Greater London, SW20 8HA; England; 51°24′50″N 0°13′22″W

Information
- Type: Voluntary aided comprehensive
- Motto: Serviam ("I will serve")
- Religious affiliation: Roman Catholic (Ursulines)
- Established: 1892
- Local authority: Merton
- Department for Education URN: 102683 Tables
- Ofsted: Reports
- Headteacher: Eoin Kelly
- Gender: Girls
- Age: 11 to 19
- Enrolment: 1299
- Colour: blue
- Website: Official website

The Ursuline High School, Wimbledon (“the Ursuline”) is a voluntary-aided, Roman Catholic Secondary School for girls aged 11 to 19. The school is based at Crescent Road and the Downs, Wimbledon, London. It was founded in 1892 by the Ursulines and was affiliated with the Ursuline Preparatory School, its previous feeder preparatory school, now closed. Since 1986 it has worked in partnership with Wimbledon College, the high school's brother school, and the two share a joint Sixth Form.

The school specialises in Business & Enterprise and Modern Foreign Languages. It was previously designated as a Gifted & Talented Lead School.

== Pastoral care ==
Each year is split into seven tutor groups: Angela, Bernadette, Catherine, Francis, Margaret, Teresa, Ursula. A peer mentoring programme is in place where sixth form girls are paired with younger girls. Counselling is available through the Youth Awareness Programme, the Ursuline Sisters and the Cabrini Society.

== Facilities ==
- The Main Building – RE, French, German, Spanish, Information and Communication, Science
- St. George – Mathematics
- Brescia – English, Design & Technology (Product Design)
- St. Ursula – Geography, History, Sociology, Psychology
- The Merici Sports Centre – PE
- St. Angela's Art Centre – Art, Music, Drama (Located on The Down

- Lunch Building

== Notable former pupils ==
- Julia Higgins DBE (b. 1942) - polymer scientist
- Jill Murphy (1949-2021) - writer
- Polly Billington (born 1967), journalist
- Siobhan Benita (born 1971), politician
- Jen Brister (born 1975), stand-up comedian
- Aggie Beever-Jones (born 2003), footballer

== Notable teachers ==
- Rachel Scott (b.1940), artist

== See also ==
- Schools in Wimbledon
- Ursulines
