= Peter Doig =

Scottish painter (born 1959)

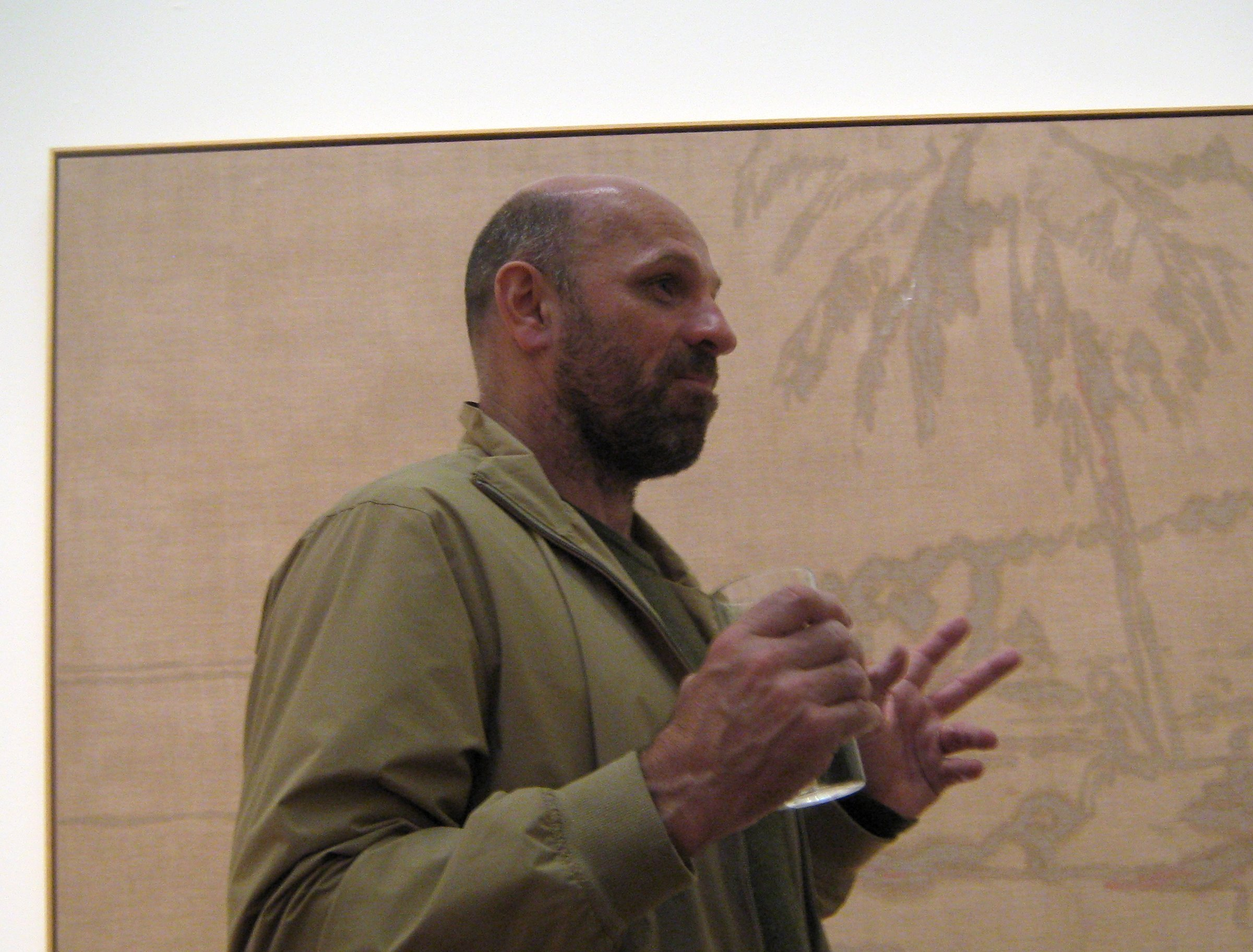
- Doig at the No Foreign Lands exhibition (2013)
- Born: 17 April 1959 (age 67); Edinburgh, Scotland, UK
- Education: Wimbledon, Saint Martin's & Chelsea
- Known for: Painting
- Spouse(s): Bernadette (Bonnie) Kennedy (div. 2016); Parinaz Mogadassi

Blotter, 1993, Walker Art Gallery, Liverpool

Peter Doig (/ˈdɔɪɡ/ DOYG; born 17 April 1959) is a British painter best known for his uncanny landscapes. Doig's work takes in a range of subjects inspired by his personal experiences, from snowscapes and ski scenes reminiscent of childhood memories.

In 2007, Doig's painting White Canoe (1990–91) sold at Sotheby's for $11.3 million, then an auction record for a living European artist. Art critic Jonathan Jones said about him: "Amid all the nonsense, impostors, rhetorical bullshit and sheer trash that pass for art in the 21st century, Doig is a jewel of genuine imagination, sincere work and humble creativity."

== Early life ==
Peter Doig was born in Edinburgh, Scotland, in 1959. In 1962, he moved with his family to Trinidad, where his father worked with a shipping and trading company, and then in 1966 to Canada. After boarding school in Scotland and working on a gas rig in western Canada, he moved to London to study at the Wimbledon School of Art in 1979–1980, where he was taught by Neil Stokoe, followed by Saint Martin's School of Art from 1980 to 1983 and Chelsea School of Art from 1989 to 1990, where he received an MA. In 1989, the artist held a part-time job as a dresser at the English National Opera.

Doig was invited to return to Trinidad in 2000, to take up an artist's residency with his friend and fellow painter, Chris Ofili. In 2002, Doig moved back to the island, where he set up a studio at the Caribbean Contemporary Arts Centre near Port of Spain. He also became a professor at the Fine Arts Academy in Düsseldorf, Germany, where he was a faculty member until 2017.

== Artistic practice ==
Many of Doig's paintings are landscapes with a number harking back to the snowy scenes of his childhood in Canada, and others inspired by the scenery in Trinidad. He draws inspiration for his figurative work from a range of sources including photographs, newspaper clippings, movie scenes, record album covers, as well as being the inheritor of art history from European to Canadian art and earlier artists such as Edvard Munch, H. C. Westermann, Friedrich, Monet, and Klimt. While his works are frequently based on found photographs (and sometimes on his own) they are not painted in a photorealist style. In a 2008 interview, Doig referred to his use of photographs and postcards as painting "by proxy" and noted that his paintings "made no attempt to reflect setting".

Shortly after Doig's graduation from the Chelsea College of Arts, he was awarded the prestigious Whitechapel Artist Prize culminating in a solo exhibition at the Whitechapel Art Gallery in 1991. Included in the Whitechapel exhibition were Swamped (1990), Iron Hill (1991), and The Architect's Home in the Ravine (1991), now considered among Doig's major works. The Architect's Home in the Ravine (1991) shows Eberhard Zeidler's modernist central Toronto home in the Rosedale ravine.

Traces of human civilisation in natural settings are a cornerstone of Doig's works, and his so-called 'Concrete Cabins' are exemplary of this theme. As well as private homes and other dwellings in Canada and the USA, Doig created a series of paintings and works on paper of Le Corbusier's modernist communal living apartments known as l'Unité d’Habitation located at Briey-en-Forêt, in France. In 1991, Doig was involved with a group of architects and artists known as La Première Rue who worked on the restoration of the building. The modern urban structures are partially revealed and hidden by the forest that surrounds them, a characteristic Doig explores in his works of the subject. Doig explained, "I had no idea that I might paint the building, I just was there sort of literally scraping paint off the inside of the building, scraping the varnish off. But then, you know, walking around the building and taking photographs of it, I realised that the photographs reminded me of some of the paintings I had already made, and I thought, ‘Maybe I could paint- maybe paint this building as well’. So, I started experimenting with these, you know, drawings and photographing and filming it and getting more and more excited about what I was seeing, really."

Pop culture references also occur frequently in Doig's work. Created in the late 1990s, a series of paintings and works on paper – including works such as Country-Rock (Wing Mirror) (1999) – depict a tunnel, a familiar landmark for Toronto residents since an anonymous artist painted a rainbow over it, at the northbound Don Valley Parkway, in 1972. The rainbow has been repainted more than 40 times over two decades, despite authorities’ attempts to remove it. His 1997 painting Canoe-Lake was inspired by the 1980 slasher film Friday the 13th. In 2003, Doig started a weekly film club called StudioFilmClub in his studio together with Trinidadian artist Che Lovelace. Doig not only selected and screened the films; he also painted posters advertising the week's film. He told an interviewer that he found this ongoing project liberating because it was "much more immediate" than his usual work.

== Exhibitions ==
Doig has had major solo exhibitions at Tate Britain (2008), touring to Musée d'Art Moderne de la Ville de Paris and Schirn Kunsthalle Frankfurt; Dallas Museum of Art (2005); Pinakothek der Moderne, Munich (2004); Bonnefanten Museum, Maastricht (2003); and Whitechapel Art Gallery, London (1998). In 2005, he was one of the artists exhibited in part 1 of The Triumph of Painting at the Saatchi Gallery in London. Doig's first major exhibition in his home country was entitled No Foreign Lands, taking place in the Scottish National Gallery, in Edinburgh, from 3 August to 3 November 2013. It was critically acclaimed and showed works created in the previous ten years, mostly during his residence in Trinidad.

The Montreal Museum of Fine Arts, in collaboration with the Scottish National Gallery of Modern Art, presented his own exhibition, the first major held in North America, from 25 January to 4 May 2014. A retrospective opened at Fondation Beyeler, Basel, in 2014, which travelled in 2015 to Louisiana Museum of Modern Art in Humlebaek, Denmark. Also in 2015, an exhibition of recent works opened at Fondazione Bevilacqua La Masa in Venice, Italy, coinciding with the 56th Venice Biennale. Recently his work was included in the group exhibition Cooperations at Fondation Beyeler (2017). From 6 September to 16 November 2019, Michael Werner Gallery hosted an exhibition of new paintings by Doig.

In February 2023, a four-month exhibition of new and recent works by Peter Doig opened at London’s Courtauld Gallery comprising 12 paintings and 20 works on paper. Most of these paintings were completed in London since his return from Trinidad in 2021, including Alpinist, Canal, Bather, Music Shop, House of Music (Soca Boat), Self-Portrait (Fernandes Compound) and Alice at Boscoe’s. He was the first contemporary artist to show at the Courtauld since its redevelopment and his display of painterly skills was widely admired by critics. In late 2023 and into 2024, the Musée d'Orsay, Paris, hosted two exhibitions by Doig, one showcasing a selection of his large-scale works, including Two Trees (2017), and the other a selection of historic works from the museum collection, chosen by Doig.

In 2023, Peter Doig created a portrait print edition of George Padmore Institute trustee Linton Kwesi Johnson. The proceeds from this series will be donated in support of the George Padmore Institute renovation works.

From 10 October 2025 to 8 February 2026, Peter Doig: House of Music was on display at the Serpentine Gallery, London. The exhibition "explore[s] the influence of music" on Doig's work. Reflecting on the dialogue between music and visual art activated by the show, Doig commented: "I think music in a way breaks down barriers and allows people to sort of look at things and experience – in this case, an exhibition – in ways that they maybe have not before, really."

== Recognition ==
In 1993, Doig won the first prize at the John Moores exhibition with his painting Blotter. This brought public recognition, cemented in 1994, when he was nominated for the Turner Prize. From 1995 to 2000, he was a trustee of the Tate Gallery. He was honoured with amfAR's Award of Excellence for Artistic Contributions to the Fight Against AIDS in 2009. He was also named the 2017 Whitechapel Gallery Art Icon.

In 2025 Doig won the prestigious Praemium Imperiale award in the category 'painting'.

== Art market ==
In 2007, a painting of Doig's entitled White Canoe (1990–91) sold at Sotheby's for $11.3 million, then an auction record for a work by a living European artist. Paul Schimmel, chief curator at the Museum of Contemporary Art, Los Angeles said in an interview that the sale made Doig go from being "a hero to other painters to a poster child of the excesses of the market".

In 2009, Night Playground (1997–98), a densely painted landscape painting being sold by Joel Mallin, a New York collector, went for $5 million at a Christie's auction in London, well above its high estimate of $3 million. Also at Christie's London, The Architect’s Home in the Ravine (1991) was auctioned at £7.66 million in early 2013.

Later in 2013, César Reyes, a psychiatrist who lives in Puerto Rico and is one of the artist's biggest collectors, sold Jetty, a 1994 canvas of a lone figure on a dock at sunset, for $11.3 million. His painting Gasthof zur Muldentalsperre (2000–02), now at the Art Institute of Chicago, was sold at Christie's in 2014 for $17,038,276. This price was surpassed by Swamped, also sold at Christie's in 2015 for $25,950,000 and in 2021 for $39,000,000. Phillips auctioned Peter Doig's 1991 canvas, Rosedale, depicting a Toronto snowfall, which was guaranteed for $25 million and sold for $28.8 million to a telephone bidder, an auction record for the artist at the time.

== Lawsuit regarding art by a similarly named painter ==
In 2016, a former Canadian corrections officer began a $5 million lawsuit against Doig over a picture he claimed was by Doig despite the artist's denial it was his work. A Chicago court ruled in Doig's favour later that year, finding that the painting was the work of a similarly named man, Peter Doige. In 2023, Doig was awarded $2.5 million in sanctions against the painting's owner, the art gallery representing the owner, and their lawyer.

== Collections ==
Doig is represented in many international museum and private collections, including the Tel Aviv Museum of Art (The House that Jacques Built, 1992); Tate, London (Echo Lake, 1998); Tate Modern, London (Ski Jacket, 1994); and the National Gallery of Canada, Ottawa (Grande Riviere, 2001–02). He is also represented at the British Museum, in London; Walker Art Gallery, in Liverpool; Southampton City Art Gallery; the National Galleries of Scotland, in Edinburgh; Musée National d'Art Moderne, in Paris; Bonnefanten Museum, in Maastricht; Goetz Collection, in Munich; Kunsthalle, in Nuremberg; Museo Cantonale d'Arte, in Lugano; Museu de Arte Moderna – Colecção Berardo, in Sintra; National Gallery of Canada, in Ottawa; Art Institute of Chicago; Museum of Modern Art, in New York; Metropolitan Museum of Art, in New York; Whitney Museum of American Art, in New York; National Gallery of Art, in Washington, D.C.; The Hirshhorn Museum, in Washington; Philadelphia Museum of Art; and Dallas Museum of Art, among other public collections.
