= Paddy Kitchen =

English novelist and art critic (1934–2005)

Patricia Margaret Kitchen (23 May 1934 – 23 November 2005) was an English novelist, biographer and art critic.

Born in Battersea to middle-class parents, she grew up in Great Missenden, Buckinghamshire. After rejecting an offer from Cambridge University she moved to London in 1954, working in a Mayfair advertising agency while moonlighting as a hat-check girl in the night club Le Club Contemporain. While working at the Royal College of Art she met the painter Frank Bowling when he was still a student there. They married in 1960 and had one son. Kitchen was one of the women interviewed by Nell Dunn in Talking to Women (1965).

After divorcing Bowling in the late 1960s, Kitchen went on to live with, and later marry, the writer Dulan Barber. Continuing to write novels, she also began writing non-fiction with biographies of Patrick Geddes and Gerard Manley Hopkins. In later life she bought a house in Barnwell, Northamptonshire, which became the subject of her book of the same name. She died on 23 November 2005.

The novelist Bessie Head was a close friend. The pair corresponded from 1969 until Head's death in 1986 on a range of subjects, including Head's novel A Question of Power.

== Works ==
=== Novels ===
- Lying-In, 1965
- A Fleshly School
- Linsey-Woolsey: A novel, 1971
- Paradise
- (with Dulan Barber) Marriage Ring: A novel, 1977
- A Pillar of Cloud, 1979
- The Golden Veil, 1981
- Blue Shoe, 1988

=== Non-fiction ===
- A Most Unsettling Person: An Introduction to the Ideas and Life of Patrick Geddes, 1975
- Gerard Manley Hopkins: A Life, 1978
- Poets' London, 1980
- Barnwell, 1985
- The Way to Write Novels, 1995
