= Frank Bowling =

British artist (born 1934)

Sir Frank Bowling OBE RA
- Born: Richard Sheridan Franklin Bowling; 26 February 1934 (age 92); Bartica, British Guiana, South America
- Education: Chelsea School of Art; Royal College of Art
- Known for: Large-scale, abstract "map paintings", and his use of found objects
- Movement: Abstract expressionism, Color Field painting and Lyrical Abstraction
- Spouse(s): Paddy Kitchen 1960–1966; Irena Delderfield (m. 1969); Rachel Scott 2013–present
- Website: frankbowling.com

Sir Richard Sheridan Patrick Michael Aloysius Franklin Bowling OBE RA (né Richard Sheridan Franklin Bowling; born 26 February 1934), known as Frank Bowling, is a British artist who was born in British Guiana. He is particularly renowned for his large-scale, abstract "Map" paintings, which relate to abstract expressionism, colour field painting and lyrical abstraction. Bowling has been described as "one of Britain’s greatest living abstract painters", as "one of the most distinguished black artists to emerge from post-war British art schools" and as a "modern master". British cultural critic and theorist Stuart Hall situates Bowling’s career within a first generation, or "wave" of post-war, Black-British art, one characterised by postwar politics and British decolonisation. He is the first black artist to be elected a member of the Royal Academy of Arts.

In 2019, Bowling was the subject of a hugely successful retrospective at Tate Britain and, in 2022, opened a major show of works that took place from 1966 to 1975 at the Museum of Fine Arts Boston. He is represented in more than fifty international collections, including the Museum of Modern Art (New York), the Metropolitan Museum of Art (New York), Tate Britain (London) and the Royal Academy of Arts (London).

Bowling studied at the Regent Street Polytechnic, Chelsea School of Art and, later, the City and Guilds of London Art School. In 1959, he was awarded a scholarship at the Royal College of Art, where he joined fellow students David Hockney, R. B. Kitaj, Derek Boshier, Patrick Caulfield and Neil Stokoe.

== Early life and education ==
Bowling was born on 26 February 1934 in Bartica, British Guiana, to Richard Bowling and his wife, Agatha.

In 1940, Bowling's father moved the family to New Amsterdam so as to take up his post as accountant and paymaster in the local police force. Bowling's mother was a highly skilled seamstress, dressmaker, and milliner; she created a successful business from scratch and built a grand three-storey clapperboard building with a boldly lettered fascia that proclaimed: "Bowling's Variety Store".

In May 1953, at the age of 19, Bowling emigrated to Britain, where he lived with an uncle in London and enrolled at Westminster College of Commerce to study English.

After National Service in the Royal Air Force, Bowling met the future artist and architect Keith Critchlow. Influenced by Critchlow, Bowling went on to study art, despite earlier ambitions to be a poet and a writer. He lodged at his parents' house in Redcliffe Gardens, Chelsea, where he was painted by Critchlow, and he studied at the Chelsea School of Art.

In 1959, Bowling won a scholarship to London's Royal College of Art, where fellow students included artists such as David Hockney, Derek Boshier, Allen Jones, R. B. Kitaj and Peter Phillips. At the beginning of his studies there, Bowling concentrated on painting still-life compositions of bottles, animals, meat and figure drawings. His Sheep’s Head paintings, made in the autumn of 1960, were a series of muddy, murky intense works reminiscent of Giorgio Morandi and his muted colour palette. Another series of paintings produced in 1960, titled the Athletes, are characterised by vivid chromatic colour and dynamically asymmetrical compositions.

Bowling graduated from the Royal College of Art in 1962.

== Career ==
=== Figurative paintings and Pop Art (1950s and 1960s) ===
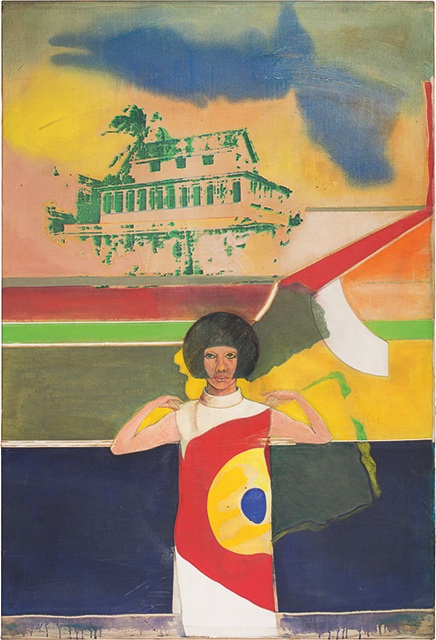
Frank Bowling, Cover Girl, 1966

Bowling’s artistic career began with his first commercial exhibition, Image in Revolt, at the Grabowski Gallery in Chelsea, London, in October 1962.

In autumn 1963, Bowling had begun to teach painting at Camberwell School of Art in London. There, with the assistance of the textiles department, he amassed a stockpile of canvas pieces bearing the image of his mother’s emporium screen-printed in red or green. The first painting in which the image was deployed was Cover Girl (1966). The title refers to the young woman with the Mary Quant-style dress and the Vidal Sassoon helmet haircut, an image appropriated from the cover of an Observer colour supplement of March 1966.

The masterpiece of the first phase of Frank Bowling’s career is Mirror (1964–66), the culmination of years of development in London. In this painting, Bowling appears twice: at the top of a spiral staircase from the Royal College of Art’s painting school, and at the foot of the stairwell, a metaphor for transition and emergence. In between is the figure of Paddy Kitchen.

=== "Map paintings" (1967–1971) ===
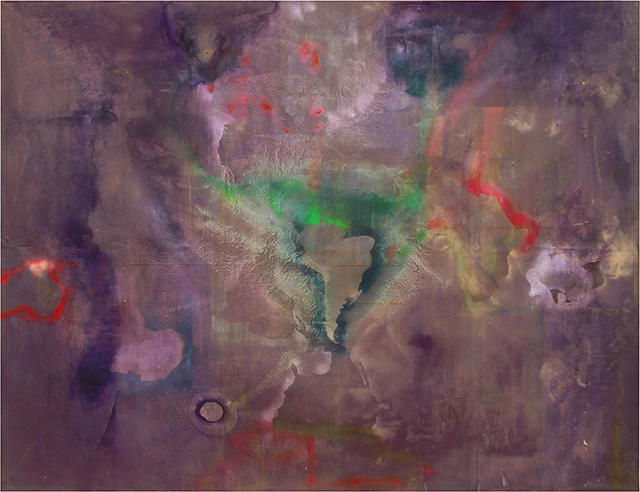
Frank Bowling, Polish Rebecca, 1971

From around 1967 to 1971, shortly after arriving in New York, Bowling made a group of works now known as the map paintings. For Bowling, the map motif served both as evocative subject matter and as device to organize the flat, modernist picture plane. Bowling elected to present three of these epically proportioned canvases – Marcia H Travels (1970), Texas Louise (1971), and Australia to Africa (1971) – together with two marginally smaller works, Polish Rebecca (1971) and Traveling with Robert Hughes (1969-70), in his first solo museum exhibition, held at the Whitney Museum of American Art from 4 November to 6 December 1971.

=== "Poured paintings" (1974–1978) ===
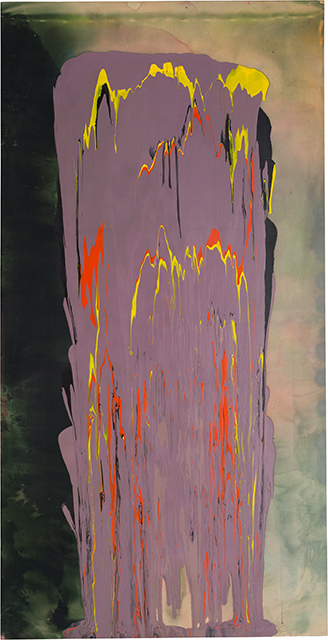
Frank Bowling, Grating Rhymes, 1978

In 1974, Bowling constructed a movable wood platform, pivoted like a seesaw, so that paint could be poured onto unstretched canvas pegged to the tilted surface. Known as the poured paintings, they were characterised by their upright, rectangular format, linearity of cascading poured paint and masked edges. The combination of chance and precise technique resulted in process-driven works that share affinities with a long lineage of abstract painting. The poured paintings were the subject of an exhibition at Tate Britain in 2012.

=== 1980s ===
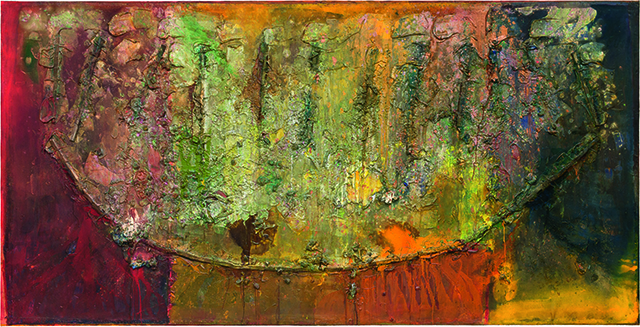
Frank Bowling, Philoctetes' Bow, 1987

By the early 1980s, dense, encrusted and flowing paintings, often using a large amount of gel, were a significant aspect of Bowling’s painterly practice. A turning point arrived in the summer of 1984, when he arrived at the Skowhegan School of Painting and Sculpture in Maine for an artist-teacher residency. Quite quickly, he began to incorporate a broad range of objects into his paintings such as newsprint, plastic and foam. In 1986, Bowling exhibited a group of major new paintings at the Serpentine Gallery in London, curated by Ronald Alley, then Keeper of Modern Art at the Tate Gallery. Among the works on display was Wintergreens (1986), now in the Royal Academy’s collection. A year after the show at the Serpentine Gallery, a key work from the same year, Spreadout Ron Kitaj (1986), was acquired by Tate. Also in 1987, Bowling created Philoctete’s Bow, a work characterised by complex, textured surfaces, essentially additive and collage-like (involving stitching, patching and gluing fragments to the surface).

Towards the end of the 1980s, Bowling made his Great Thames series of paintings (1989), in homage to the great English landscape painters J. M. W. Turner and Thomas Gainsborough. This was also the period Bowling started making sculpture. Seven sculptures resulted. For the 1988 exhibition at the Royal West of England Academy (RWA) in Bristol, he made a further group of sculptures in galvanised steel.

=== 2000s to the present ===
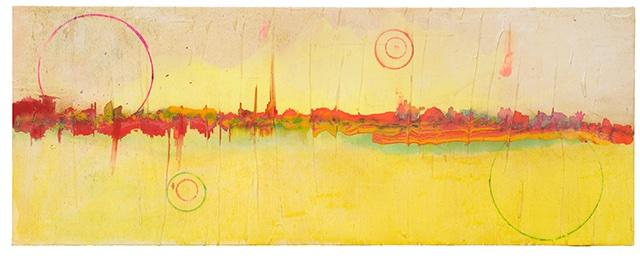
Frank Bowling, Epps, 2009

In 2009, Bowling produced a series of vertical and horizontal "zippers" paintings, including Epps, Litchfield and Chinese Chance (all 2009), suggesting tall skies or long horizons. In 2011, Bowling presented new works known as the Crossings at ROLLO Contemporary Art in London. In these paintings, bands of colour are overloaded along the centre of the canvas creating a thickly textured build-up of contrasting colour. Crossing: Snakeheadpassage (2011) and Crossing: Liberty (2011) are two such examples.

In 2017, there was a retrospective of his work at Haus der Kunst in Munich. A major retrospective exhibition of his work was on view at Tate Britain in 2019. Land of Many Waters, a major exhibition of unseen works by Bowling, alongside key paintings from the previous decade, was exhibited at the Arnolfini in Bristol in 2021. In 2022, the Stephen Lawrence Gallery at the University of Greenwich focused on his sculptures and the sculptural aspects of his paintings in an exhibition called Frank Bowling and sculpture.

The exhibition Frank Bowling's Americas was at the Museum of Fine Arts Boston from 22 October 2022 to 9 April 2023 and at the San Francisco Museum of Modern Art (SFMOMA) from 13 May to 10 September 2023.

Bowling's paintings have been shown in numerous exhibitions in continental Europe, the United Kingdom and the United States and are included in major private and corporate collections worldwide. His work can also be seen in the permanent collections of the Metropolitan Museum of Art and the Museum of Modern Art in New York, as well as the Tate Gallery in London.

In 2024 The Tate Library in Brixton hosted an exhibition of his work with discussions and workshops about his art as part of Black History month.

=== Art criticism, curatorial work and teaching ===
From 1969 to 1972, Bowling was a critic and contributing editor at Arts Magazine, where he rejected the idea that "artists who happen to be black" should be making overtly political or protest art, and defended those engaged in abstraction. His critical writings represent a significant contribution to intellectual debates on "black art". His writings have been included in several publications such as The Soul of a Nation Reader and Mappa Mundi.

In 1969, he organised an important exhibition at Stony Brook University, New York, titled 5+1 that included abstract works by five Black American artists – Melvin Edwards, Daniel LaRue Johnson, Al Loving, Jack Whitten, and William T. Williams – together with his own paintings. Bowling held teaching positions at many institutions, including at Camberwell School of Art, where he taught painting in 1963, and lectureships at the University of Reading (until 1967); Columbia University, New York (until 1969); Rutgers University, New Jersey (until 1970); and Massachusetts College of Art, Boston (1970–71).

=== Role within the history of postwar British art ===
From the late 1960s onwards, Bowling’s work appeared in many of the century’s most important exhibitions that centred upon the work of Black-British and Afro-Caribbean artists. Historian and artist Eddie Chambers notes how Bowling took part in an important, though now largely forgotten, 1978 London exhibition entitled Afro-Caribbean Art alongside a variety of other major artists from Africa and its diasporic populations. Participants included Lubaina Himid, Donald Locke, Eugene Palmer, Mohamed Ahmed Abdalla and Keith Ashton.

Bowling was also featured in the highly influential 1989 exhibition The Other Story, held in London’s South Bank Centre. The show sought to survey the history of postwar, Black-British art, serving as one of only two shows to ever tackle the subject matter. Curated by the London-based, Pakistani artist Rasheed Araeen, the landmark show sought to demonstrate the ways in which the history of contemporary non-Western art could be understood as both a variety of independent art-historical narratives as well as integral to a mainstream story of global art history. Araeen devised this curatorial approach as a protest against what he took to be a pervasive way of marginalising non-Western art histories in which artists working outside of the Western canon would be presented as existing within an insular, Western-adjacent canon. Participants included Rasheed Araeen, Salim Arif, Eddie Chambers, Aubrey Williams and Ronald Moody.

== Family life ==
Bowling married textile artist Rachel Scott in 2013.

While working at the Royal College of Art, he met the novelist, biographer and art critic Paddy Kitchen when she was a member of staff there. They married in 1960 (divorcing in 1966) and had one son, who is now deceased: Richard Sheridan Bowling (1962–2001), known as Dan Bowling.

Frank Bowling has two other sons: Ben Bowling (born 1962), Professor of Criminology & Criminal Justice at King's College London, whose mother is the artist Claire Spencer; and Sacha Bowling (born 1964), a film maker and photographer, whose mother is Irena Delderfield Bowling (whom Bowling married in 1969).

== Style and influences ==
Over the course of six decades, Bowling has pursued a practice which expands the possibilities and properties of paint. His engagement with the materiality of his chosen medium, and its evolution in art history, has resulted in paintings of originality and power.

In his earliest works, Bowling was influenced by the work of Rembrandt, Goya, Van Gogh and Francis Bacon. From 1962 onwards, Bowling began to think deeply about geometry as an architectonic principle in his paintings. His interest in this direction dated at least from his Royal College dissertation on Piet Mondrian. The diptych Big Bird (1964) and Mirror (1964–66) are major examples of the importance of geometry to his work.

A notable change in Bowling’s style occurred in 1966, shortly after arriving in New York. Paintings from his first months in the city understandably spring from pop art influences that had characterised his art over the past years but, around 1969, Bowling worked with personal photographs, letters, and cutout stencils of continents, overlapping references to geography, memory, and history in canvases he stained and splattered with liquid sweeps of acrylic paint. At this point, he befriended pop artists Larry Rivers and Jasper Johns, who were instrumental in his development as a painter.

In 1984, Bowling spent a productive nine weeks as an artist-in-residence at Skowhegan School of Painting and Sculpture in rural Maine, United States, where he was inspired by the green landscape of the surrounding countryside. Bowling’s paintings from the mid-1980s assimilated his memories of classical English landscape painting with the revelation at Skowhegan. It was at this point that Bowling began incorporating objects into his paintings, influenced by the painter Larry Poons.

The sculptures Bowling made for the 1988 Royal West of England Academy recall the work of a number of modernist sculptors, among them Bowling’s friend David Evison, Brian Wall, John Panting and William Turnbull.

Art historians and critics have understood Bowling as a late proponent of modernism. This can easily be observed in his career-long engagement with abstract expressionism. However, Bowling more fundamentally maintains the famously modernist understanding of painting, and art-making more generally, as a profoundly intellectual act that, as Kobena Mercer notes, "demanded continuous reflection on the ideas, sources and materials of their work". Stuart Hall notes how the African and diasporic artists of Bowling’s generation understood their appropriation of modernist abstraction, a European style, as a critical or postcolonial endeavour. He writes, "However 'modern art' was seen by them as an international creed, fully consistent with anti-colonialism which was regarded as intrinsic to a modern consciousness". Rasheed Araeen, the Pakistani conceptual artist and famed curator of The Other Story, calling modernism "the only way of dealing with the aspirations of our time". This emphasis on modernist art as a means of reflective critique, though not necessarily political, is theorised by modernist critic Clement Greenberg, one of Bowling's most important influences, in essays such as "Modernist Painting".

== Critical assessment ==
Bowling has been described as "one of Britain’s greatest living abstract painters", as "one of the most distinguished black artists to emerge from post-war British art schools" and as a "modern master". Writing for Art Basel, the art curator Sam Cornish said: "Central to Bowling’s art is an astonishing aliveness to the mutability of color, as hue and material, combined with a flair for accumulating granular visual detail into dramatic, large-scale panoramas".

== Awards, honours and recognition ==
Bowling’s first award was a bursary from the Royal College of Art. He graduated in 1962 with a silver medal for painting. After graduating, Bowling was awarded a travelling scholarship, and travelled to Barbados, Trinidad and British Guiana (now Guyana). In 1967, Bowling was awarded a Guggenheim Fellowship, followed by a painting prize at Edinburgh Open 100, Scotland, for his painting, My Guyana, 1966–67. In 1973, he received his second Guggenheim Fellowship and then, in 1977, a Arts Council of Great Britain Award.

In 2005, Bowling was elected a member of the Royal Academy of Arts. He was among about a dozen artists proposed to fill one of two vacancies in the 80-member academy, and is the first black artist to be elected a Royal Academician in the history of the institution. He was elected a Senior Royal Academician on 1 October 2011.

Bowling was appointed Officer of the Order of the British Empire (OBE) in the 2008 Birthday Honours. He was knighted in the 2020 Birthday Honours for services to art. He was awarded the 2022 Wolfgang Hahn Prize by the Gesellschaft für Moderne Kunst am Museum Ludwig.

== Selected exhibitions ==
- Feeling Color: Aubrey Williams and Frank Bowling, Modern Art Museum of Fort Worth, Fort Worth, Texas, 2025
- Collage, Hauser & Wirth, Paris, 2025. [solo]
- Frank Bowling’s Americas, New York, 1966–75. Museum of Fine Arts Boston and San Francisco Museum of Modern Art, 2022–23.
- Frank Bowling: Penumbral Light. Hauser & Wirth, Zurich, 2022.
- Frank Bowling: Sculpture. Stephen Lawrence Gallery, University of Greenwich Galleries, London, 2022.
- Frank Bowling: Wolfgang Hahn Prize. Museum Ludwig, Cologne, Germany, 2022.
- Slip Zone: A New Look at Postwar Abstraction in the Americas and East Asia, Dallas Museum of Art, 2021–22.
- Frank Bowling: Land of Many Waters. Arnolfini Gallery, Bristol, 2021.
- Frank Bowling: London/New York, Hauser & Wirth, London and New York, 2021.
- Frank Bowling. Tate Britain. London, 2019.
- Soul of a Nation: Art in the Age of Black Power. Tate Modern, London, 2018.
- Frank Bowling: Mappa Mundi. Haus der Kunst, Munich, 2017–18.
- Frank Bowling: Map Paintings, Dallas Museum of Art, Dallas, 2015.
- Journeyings: Recent Works on Paper by Frank Bowling RA. Royal Academy of Arts, London, 2011.
- Frank Bowling RA: Crossings. Rollo Contemporary Art, London, 2011.
- Frank Bowling: Full of Light – A Survey Exhibition Featuring Paintings from 1978 to 2004. G.R. N’Namdi Gallery, Detroit, Michigan, United States, 2005.
- Bending the Grid: Black Identity and Resistance in the Art of Frank Bowling. Aljira, a Center for Contemporary Art, Newark, New Jersey, United States, 2003.
- Fault Lines: Contemporary African Art and Shifting Landscapes. Venice Biennale, 2003.
- Frank Bowling: Bowling on Through the Century. Multiple venues, 1996–67.
- Frank Bowling: Painting. Serpentine Gallery, London, 1986.
- Frank Bowling. Whitney Museum of American Art, New York, 1971.

== Bibliography ==
=== Exhibition catalogues ===
- Alloway, Lawrence, Hunter, Sam and Bowling, Frank. 5+1. New York: State University of New York at Stony Brook, 1969.
- Alley, Ronald. Frank Bowling. London: Serpentine Gallery, 1986.
- Enwezor, Okwuri; with contributions by Frank Bowling, Okwui Enwezor, Rose Jones, Kobena Mercer, Anna Schneider, Zoe Whitley, Lynette Yiadom-Boakye. Frank Bowling: Mappa Mundi. Munich, London, and New York: Prestel, 2014.
- Crippa, Elena, ed. Frank Bowling. London: Tate Publishing, 2009.
- Brace, Gemma. Frank Bowling. Land of Many Waters. Bristol: Arnolfini, 2021.

=== Books ===
- Cornish, Sam. Frank Bowling: Sculpture. London: Ridinghouse, 2022.
- Gooding, Mel. Frank Bowling. London: Royal Academy of Arts, 2011 (2nd edition, 2015).

=== Public collections ===
Bowling's works can be found in more than 50 international public institutions, including:

- Tate Britain, London
- Museum of Modern Art, New York
- Metropolitan Museum of Art, New York
- Eli and Edythe Broad Art Museum, Michigan State University, East Lansing, Michigan
- Museum of Fine Arts Boston, Boston
- San Francisco Museum of Modern Art, San Francisco
- Pinault Collection, Bourse du Commerce, Paris
- Moderna Museet, Stockholm
- Museum Ludwig, Cologne
- Royal Academy of Arts, London
- Museum of Art, Łódź, Poland
- Minneapolis Institute of Art, Minneapolis, Minnesota
- Victoria and Albert Museum, London
- The Menil Collection, Houston
- Whitney Museum of American Art, New York
