= Neil Stokoe =

British painter (1935–2019)

- Born: Neil Stokoe; 10 December 1935; Bowburn, County Durham, England
- Died: 7 June 2019 (aged 83)
- Education: Sunderland College of Art; Royal College of Art
- Known for: Painting; art education
- Movement: Post-war British figurative art

Neil Stokoe (10 December 1935 – 30 June 2019) was a British painter and teacher whose pioneering, figurative artworks often depicted psychologically charged interior spaces and modern architecture. A contemporary of David Hockney, Frank Bowling and R. B. Kitaj at the Royal College of Art (RCA), he eschewed careerism and seldom had his works exhibited. It is only recently that his work and influence have begun to gain wider public recognition.

== Early life and education ==
Stokoe was born in Bowburn, County Durham, on 10 December 1935. He developed an early interest in art while at Durham School and in 1953 entered the Sunderland College of Art (1953–57). After completing National Service with the RAF he enrolled at the Royal College of Art in 1959 (Painting, 1959–62), where he was awarded the RCA Medal for General Studies and a continuation scholarship through 1963–64.

== Career ==
From 1963, Stokoe taught at Wimbledon School of Art (later Wimbledon College of Arts), initially in Art History and then in Painting, before joining the Foundation course staff from 1966 until his retirement in 2000. He also lectured at Portsmouth Polytechnic. His students included the painter Peter Doig.

Declining to exhibit or sell his works almost entirely, Stokoe shunned self-promotion, preferring the creative freedom which painting in obscurity allowed him. The few public appearances of his works during his own lifetime included the John Moores exhibitions at the Walker Art Gallery, Liverpool (1963, 1967); Out of a Clear Blue Sky (Pilgrim Gallery, 2002), In This Vale of Tears (Langham Gallery, 2011), the Piper Gallery (2013), and Neil Stokoe: Paintings from the 60s On at the Redfern Gallery (2015). In 2024 Saatchi Yates, London, presented a 14-work retrospective, his first posthumous solo exhibition, which helped to reintroduce his work to a wider audience.

== Work and style ==
Many of Stokoe’s paintings feature couples and solitary figures set within chic modern interiors, anticipating strands of modernism. Stokoe himself acknowledged the lasting influence of his friend Francis Bacon.

== Collections ==
Works by Stokoe are held in the Arts Council Collection.

== Personal life and death ==
Stokoe married Margaret Atkinson in 1963 (div.), and in 1977 married Laura Barber; they had two sons. He died on 30 June 2019.

== Selected exhibitions ==
- John Moores, Walker Art Gallery, Liverpool (1963; 1967) – group
- Clytie Jessop Gallery, London (1970) – solo
- Art Basel with Nicholas Treadwell Gallery (1976–77) – group
- Royal Academy Summer Exhibition (1994) – invited artist
- Pilgrim Gallery, London (2002; 2003; 2004) – solo
- Langham Gallery, London (2011; 2012) – exhibitions
- The Piper Gallery, London (2013) – solo
- The Redfern Gallery, London (2015) – solo
- Saatchi Yates, London, retrospective (2024) – solo
