= Rachel Scott (artist) =

British textile artist (born 1948)

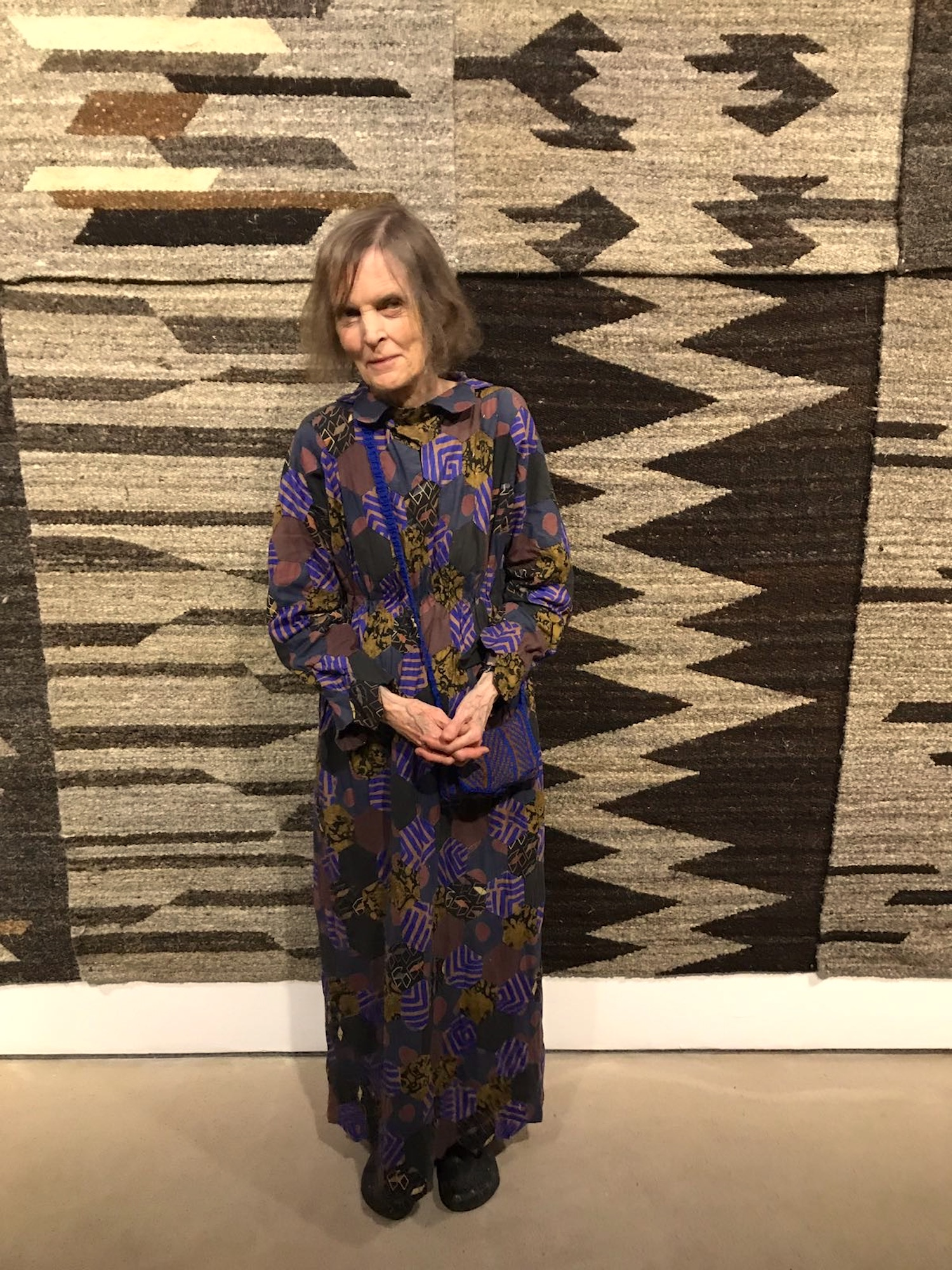
- Portrait of the artist in front of her woven tapestries
- Born: Rachel Tripp; 20 April 1940 (age 86); Fulmerchase, Buckinghamshire, England, United Kingdom.
- Education: Royal College of Art (1959–1964)
- Known for: Textiles; weaving
- Spouse: Frank Bowling (2013–present)
- Website: www.rachelsrugs.com

Rachel Scott, Lady Bowling née Tripp (born 20 April 1940 in Fulmerchase, Buckinghamshire, England), known professionally as Rachel Scott or Rachel Scott Bowling, is a British artist who creates "rustic hand-spun rugs", hand-woven with her own spun undyed wool from breeds of British sheep with different coloured fleeces. She grew up in the Somerset, Dorset and Hampshire countryside before moving to London in 1959 to study painting at the Royal College of Art.

== Education and early career ==
Rachel Scott was one of three students to receive a four-year undergraduate place being trialled at the Royal College of Art for students who had not previously studied at art school for four years. Scott also won a continuation scholarship that extended her studies to a fifth year and a travelling scholarship with which she travelled to Italy, Greece and Turkey. Many of Scott’s fellow students had undertaken national service before beginning their studies.

During this time at the Royal College the primary subjects of Scott’s paintings were the interiors of the buildings around her. She painted the corridors and windows of the Cromwell Road common room and stairwells, and was particularly drawn to passages and openings. In 1964 she was elected a member of The London Group, an artist-led collective that was established in 1913.

After leaving the RCA she taught pottery part-time at the Ursuline High School, Wimbledon until her daughters were born in 1967 and 1970. She bought a kiln for herself in 1972. Scott used red and buff clay to make pinch pots and unglazed chess sets. For children she made miniature farm and tea sets, and cups with animal heads. Her ceramics were sold at craft fairs and in numerous outlets in London, including the department stores Liberty and Heals.

Scott also made and sold small woollen toys, such as crocheted bears, elephants, donkeys, owls and cats. She used lambswool jumpers that she found at jumble sales and unravelled them to make the small woollen animals. This was a continuation of a craft taught to her by her mother of making small animals from pipe cleaners bound with wool.

== Painting (1959–1979) ==
Scott’s early paintings were of rooms, passages and staircases in burnt umber, raw umber and white. By 1970 her focus shifted to darker interiors of black, white and grey paintings, mainly of empty rooms and tunnels. From 1976 until the late 1970s Scott painted mainly landscapes of Dorset, such as The Glebe, Durweston, where she grew up. Scott stopped painting in 1979 and focused solely on her weaving practice.

== Weaving (1976–present) ==
Before she started weaving, Scott tore up and dyed white baby clothes, nappies and sheets and to make braided rag rugs.

In 1976 Scott noticed the stair carpet at her home was wearing out and needed replacing. She began weaving from this point and took weekend courses in spinning and tapestry weaving at the Handweavers Studio in Walthamstow.

Scott’s then-husband found wood from a skip to make her an upright frame loom, which she used to make hand-woven rugs. Scott had been inspired by an exhibition of Navajo blankets that she had seen at the Institute of Contemporary Arts, London in May or June 1973.

She spun the wool for the rugs using a spinning wheel made by her brother. It consisted of a long bobbin screwed to a Singer sewing machine base.

Scott uses undyed fleeces in different colours from British sheep such as Shetlands, Herdwicks, Black Welsh Mountain sheep and Manx Loaghtans.

== Clothes ==
Scott began making clothes as a child and knitted jumpers for her father and brother. Difficulties with getting the sizing right led her to make knitted rectangles that she sewed together so that the size could be adapted to the wearer.

From the mid-1960s Scott started making suits from crochet squares and knitted rectangles for herself, then in the 1970s she began making patchwork dresses to wear. Scott continues to only wear the clothes she has made: handmade crocheted and knitted woollen suits in the winter and patchwork cotton dresses in the summer. She stopped making new garments in the early 2000s, instead replacing and mending what already exists.

Manuela Wirth of Hauser & Wirth has featured Scott’s suits and dresses as part of The Forgotten Her Story project that celebrates women who are artists, craftswomen and thinkers.

== Frank Bowling ==
In 1977 Scott reconnected with the abstract artist Frank Bowling who was spending more time in London after living in New York since 1966. She and Bowling first met when they were both students of painting at the Royal College of Art. They married in 2013.

From the 1980s onwards, Bowling named some of his paintings after Scott, including a series called Rachel in 1989 and 1991, and Scottscarkeysaltar in 1983, that has Scott’s car keys embedded in the work.

Scott has supported Bowling in his artmaking, making contributions to interviews and oral histories and taking him to his daily studio sessions. A colourfully handknitted patchwork armchair by Scott, that Bowling always used to sit at their home, is now a mainstay of the studio.

In September 1990 in New York, the inventory of Bowling’s works was instigated due to a studio move from 535 Broadway, Manhattan to Dumbo, Brooklyn, which required new racks to be made for the works. From then on, Scott kept a ring-bound notebook where she recorded an inventory of Bowling’s paintings in New York and London.

Bowling and Scott have exhibited their work in parallel at two separate solo exhibitions at the Cookhouse Galleries at Chelsea College of Arts in 2015, and side by side in Scott’s exhibition at MAKE, Hauser & Wirth.

Scott and Bowling are patrons of Chisenhale Gallery in the London Borough of Tower Hamlets and Scott supports young artists with a bursary at the Hampstead School of Art, London where she is a patron.

== Family life ==
Scott and Bowling live in Pimlico, London.

Scott has two daughters, Marcia and Iona, both of whom are professional artists. Marcia is a painter; Iona is a sculptor and multimedia artist.

== Awards and recognition ==
At the Aljira Fine Art Auction in Newark, New Jersey in May 2013, Frank Bowling and Rachel Scott received, jointly, Aljira's first Timehri Lifetime Achievement Award.

== Selected exhibitions ==
=== Exhibitions (paintings) ===
- 1964 Stroud Festival, Gloucestershire
- 1964 Brighton Art Gallery, Sussex
- 1964 Summer Exhibition, Royal Academy, London
- 1964 Royal College of Art Gallery, London [two-person]
- 1964 London Group [elected a member of the London Group], Art Federation Galleries, London
- 1965 London Group, RBA Galleries, London
- 1966 London Group, Piccadilly, London
- 1972 Five Painters, Royal College of Art Gallery, London
- 1980 Piccadilly Gallery, Cork Street, London

=== Exhibitions (weaving) ===
- 1979 Mag Mell Gallery, Paddington Street, London
- 1981 Friars Walk Craft Centre, Maldon, Essex [solo]
- 1984 Spitalfields Workspace, Heneage Street, London [solo]
- 1986–87 Open Studios, Cable Street, London
- 1988 Cuming Library, Walworth Road, London
- 1990 Southwark Open, South London Gallery, London
- 1991 St Stephen's Church, Stockwell, London
- 1993 Beyond Function, Brenau University Gallery, Gainesville, Georgia, USA
- 1998 Tithe Barn, Wimpole Hall, Cambridgeshire
- 1999 Horizons 99, The Crystal Glass Centre, Stourbridge, Worcestershire
- 2003–19 Pullens Open Studios, Peacock Yard, London
- 2006 Liberty, London, 30 rugs bought and displayed [solo]
- 2008 Origin: The London Craft Fair, Somerset House, London
- 2008 Must Have More, Aspex, Gunwharf Quays, Portsmouth
- 2008 Handspun, Dyed and Undyed, Queens Hall Art Centre, Hexham, Northumberland [solo]
- 2010–13 Handmade in Britain, Chelsea Old Town Hall, London
- 2011 Origin: The Contemporary Craft Fair, Old Spitalfields Market, London
- 2011 Heimtextil, Frankfurt, Germany
- 2012 A Family Affair, The Cello Factory, London
- 2013 Selvedge Winter Fair, Chelsea Old Town Hall, London
- 2014 O’Dell’s, Shoreditch, London Design Festival, London
- 2015 Warp and Weft, Cookhouse Gallery, Chelsea College of Art, London
- 2016 3 Women Artists: Wool, Clay and Paint, The Cello Factory, London
- 2016 Makers House, A collaboration between Burberry and The New Craftsmen, London
- 2017 Textiles: Rachel Scott at Hales Gallery, Hales Gallery, London [solo]
- 2017 Animal, Vegetable and Mineral, The New Craftsmen, Mayfair, London
- 2018 New Work, Hampstead School of Art, London [solo]
- 2019 Under Your Feet, Ruthin Craft Centre, Denbighshire, Wales
- 2021 Rachel Scott – Tapestry Weaving, Malmstensbutiken, Stockholm, Sweden
- 2022 Competere: An Exhibition of Artist Couples, The Bo Bartlett Center, Columbus State University, Georgia, USA
- 2022 Winter Exhibition, Darl-e and the Bear, Woodstock, New York
- 2022 Weaving my World, MAKE, Hauser & Wirth, Bruton, Somerset [solo]
- 2023 With My Hands, MAKE, Hauser & Wirth, Southampton, Long Island, New York [solo]
- 2024–25 Landscape in Weaving, Hampstead School of Art, London [solo]

== Bibliography ==
=== Exhibition catalogues ===
- Langtry, Isabel H. Landscape in weaving, London: HSoA Publishing, 2024
- Bunker, John. Rachel Scott New Works 2017–2018, London: HSoA Publishing, 2018

=== Books ===
- Treggiden, Katie. Weaving: Contemporary Makers on the Loom. Ludion, 2018
