= James Sheptycki =

James Sheptycki is a Professor of Criminology at York University, Toronto, Canada.

Sheptycki received a Ph.D. in sociology from the London School of Economics in 1991. His doctoral thesis was titled Investigation of policing policy in relation to 'domestic violence' in London in the 1980s. He was an ESRC post-doctoral research fellow and lecturer in the Centre for Criminology and the Social and Philosophical Study of Law at the University of Edinburgh from 1993 to 1999. His research interests centre on policing and crime under conditions of transnationalisation.

== Books ==
- (ed.) Issues in Transnational Policing, London: Routledge, (2000) ISBN 978-0-415-19261-3 ISBN 0415192617
- In Search of Transnational Policing; towards a sociology of global policing, Aldershot: Avebury, (2003) ISBN 978-0-7546-2295-6 ISBN 0754622959
- (ed.) with Ali Wardak, Transnational and Comparative Criminology, London: Routledge Cavendish, (2005) ISBN 978-1-904385-05-9 ISBN 1904385052
- En quête de police transnationale: Vers une sociologie de la surveillance à l’ère de la globalisation, Bruxelles: De Boek & Larcier, (2005); ISBN 978-2-8044-1578-5 ISBN 2804415783
- (ed.) with Andrew Goldsmith, Crafting Transnational Policing; Police Capacity-Building and Global Police Reform, Onati International Series in Law and Society, Oxford: Hart Publishing ISBN 978-1-84113-776-6 ISBN 1841137766
