= StopWatch =

Civil right organisation

StopWatch is a joint venture between a range of civil society organizations, activist and human rights groups, academics, and campaigners in the United Kingdom (UK). StopWatch was established to address concerns about the use of Stop and Search powers by police in the UK with regards to the law, community relations, and civil rights. Its primary target is addressing the ethnic disproportionality in the use of stop and search. It also aims to review the use of Stop and Search powers that do not require reasonable suspicion to order a stop and search, such as Section 60 of the Criminal Justice and Public Order Act 1994, and to ensure monitoring and accountability are employed in conjunction with Stop and Search powers. In addition, it aims to promote methods of policing that do not have the same impact on civil liberties and community relations.

The StopWatch Campaign involves: Equanomics UK; Federation of Student Islamic Societies (FOSIS); Mannheim Centre for Criminology, LSE; Muslim Safety Forum; NACRO; Not Another Drop; Open Society Justice Initiative; Release; The Runnymede Trust; School of Law, King's College London; Second Wave; and Turning Point.

== History ==
StopWatch began formation in the summer of 2010 in response to concerns about the use of a variety of stop and search powers. Following a ruling by the European Court of Human Rights that the power to search people without suspicion was illegal, amendments to Section 44 powers were proposed by the new Home Secretary Theresa May. Previously, police officers were, in certain defined areas, able to use anti-terrorism legislation to stop people without requiring reasonable suspicion that they were actually involved in terrorism. Under the new proposals, police officers would no longer have this license. However, StopWatch has drawn attention to changes to the Police and Criminal Evidence Act 1984, which would remove requirements for the collection of key data such as name, and whether any injury or damage resulted from the incident.

StopWatch was officially launched on 18 October 2010 by Jesse Jackson at King's College London. Reverend Jackson has previously addressed similar issues in the US with his Rainbow PUSH coalition in New York.

One of StopWatch's key targets is a 50% reduction in dis-proportionality in stop and search figures. Since its formation, statistics were released indicating that Black people were 26 times more likely to be stopped and searched. Members claimed, however, that their aim is not to eliminate stop and search powers per se, but rather to help create a more responsible, and measured approach to its usage, as well as enhance police officers’ interaction with the public generally.
